= Reese, Texas =

- Unincorporated community
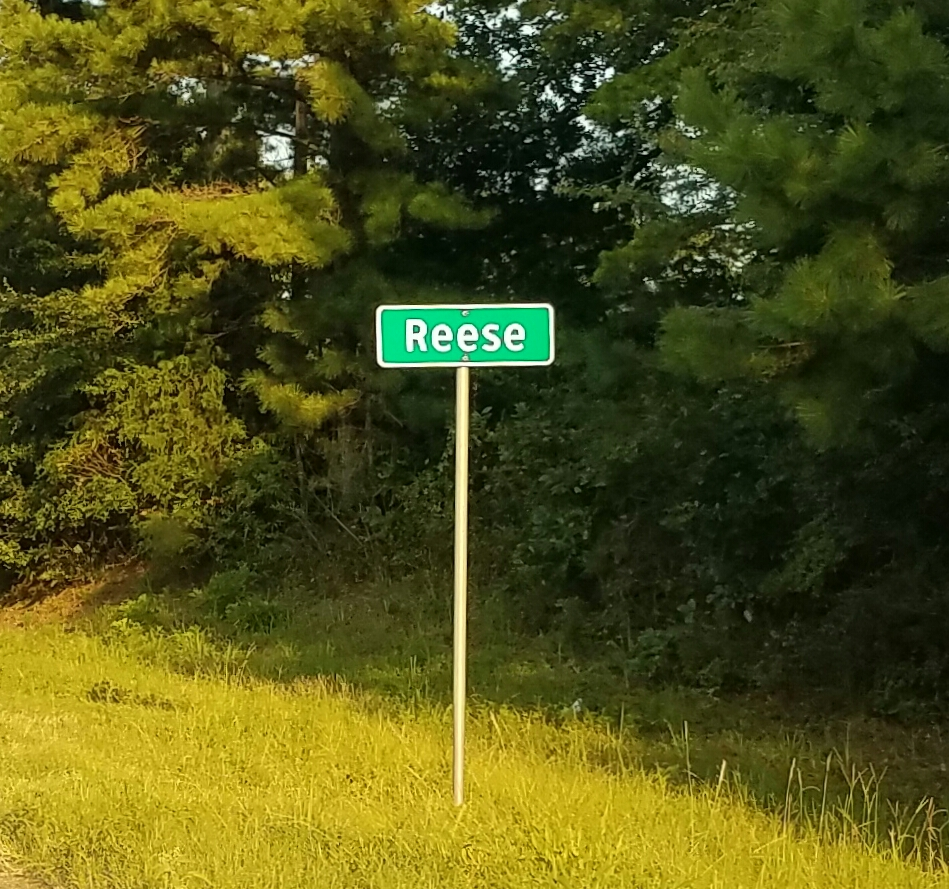
- Highway guide sign on the west side of Reese, alongside U.S. Highway 175, looking east.

- Location within the state of Texas Reese (the United States)
- Coordinates: 32°1′24″N 95°23′32″W
- Country: United States
- State: Texas
- County: Cherokee
- Elevation: 397 ft (121 m)
- Time zone: UTC-6 (Central (CST))
  - Summer (DST): UTC-5 (CDT)
- Area codes: 430, 903

Reese is a rural unincorporated community in Cherokee County, in the U.S. state of Texas, situated in the East Texas region. Its population was last estimated at 75, but no current U.S. Census data is available. It is located within the Tyler-Jacksonville combined statistical area.

== Geography and topography ==
Reese is located on U.S. Highway 175, 20 mi (32 km) northwest of Rusk in northwestern Cherokee County.

== History, Economy and Infrastructure ==
Reese was first settled sometime after the American Civil War and the Reese community developed when a logging camp was established in the 1890s. By the end of that decade, it had a store, a mill, a gin, and several scattered houses. It had a population of 15 in 1896. All three businesses were the focal point of the community. In 1914, the community had a church, a drugstore, a cotton gin, two sawmills, two general stores, and 50 residents. It remained prosperous throughout the 1920s and the population grew to 100 in 1929. It subsequently declined when U.S. Highway 175 was built north of Reese that same year. The decline continued after World War II. Its population was 75 in 2000.

Other businesses included a candle factory, a fish farm, a Ford dealership, a mechanic shop, as well as agriculture (farms, ranches, and production of hay, tomatoes, and peaches, among other produce items).

Reese had its own post office starting in 1895; Miss Angie Lane was the first postmistress there and had the name "Andy" established (for a Jacksonville postmaster, A.J. "Andy" Lane) initially at the settlement. The area had a post office until the mid-1900s, but since then residents have received rural route service from nearby Jacksonville; otherwise, letter drop service and stamps can be found much closer, at the post office in Cuney.

In 1901, a rail line with a switch came through, originally operated by the Texas & New Orleans Railroad, which later became part of the Southern Pacific Railroad. This rail line connected Dallas to Nacogdoches and was mostly treated as a freight railroad. The site of the switch was named for Reese Lloyd, a T&NO conductor. When it was made known about the naming of the switch, the next local postmaster had the name of the settlement changed to "Reese" from "Andy". For the first few years, passenger service was offered through the Reese station but eventually that was discontinued while freight runs would still pass through the area. As railroad companies were streamlining and restructuring in later years, some rail corridors proved to be too costly or were found obsolete, including the rail line through Reese. Southern Pacific abandoned the line in 1985, closing a chapter on the community's early economic prominence.

Even though Reese lost one connection, it still has another. The community is bisected west to east by U.S. Highway 175, providing residents with direct access to the nearby cities of Jacksonville, Cuney, and Frankston, as well as distant cities like Athens and Dallas, farther west. This access provides the current economic lifeline outside the community.

All utility services available to community residents come from outside of Reese.

Type	Provider(s)	Information, contacts
Electric	Cherokee County Electric Cooperative	website
Gas	Atmos Energy	website
Internet	CenturyLink (dial-up, through local phone service), HughesNet (by satellite), WildBlue From MyBlueDish (by satellite); Slipstream Broadband (wireless)	CenturyLink website, HughesNet website, MyBlueDish website Slipstream website
Satellite TV (cable TV not available in Reese area)	DirecTV, Dish Network (both have availability of local channels in the Tyler/Longview TV market)	DirecTV website, Dish Network website
Telephone (cellular)	AT&T, Sprint, Verizon (includes Alltel) (all have signals in the area)	Alltel website, AT&T website, Sprint website, Verizon website
Telephone (wireline)	CenturyLink (previously provided by Embarq prior to merger with CenturyTel)	website
Water	West Jacksonville Water Supply Corporation	No website found; the firm can be contacted at POB 1245, Jacksonville, TX 75766; 903/586-7063

== Social life ==
Various forms of social activities and get-togethers have taken place in Reese over the years: ice cream socials with hand-cranked ice cream, trick-or-treating at Halloween, and Christmas caroling, to name a few. Occasionally, "dinner on the ground", a primarily outdoor event held usually in the afternoon, would take place outside the community church. Meals were similar to potluck dinners or covered-dish suppers and were a way for those of the church's congregation to be together outside of church services.

The church, historically a Church of Christ for the most part, was a focal point in Reese over many decades. Baptisms would take place in nearby creeks or would be hosted by other area Churches of Christ until a building renovation in the 1970s would bring a baptistry, as well as indoor plumbing, central air conditioning, and much-needed extra space. By the 1990s, though, a majority of the church's congregation had either died or moved away from the community. The decision was made to disband the congregation, most of whom found their way to churches in larger nearby towns. The building, alongside what had been the railroad through Reese, was sold and moved to another church group elsewhere in Cherokee County.

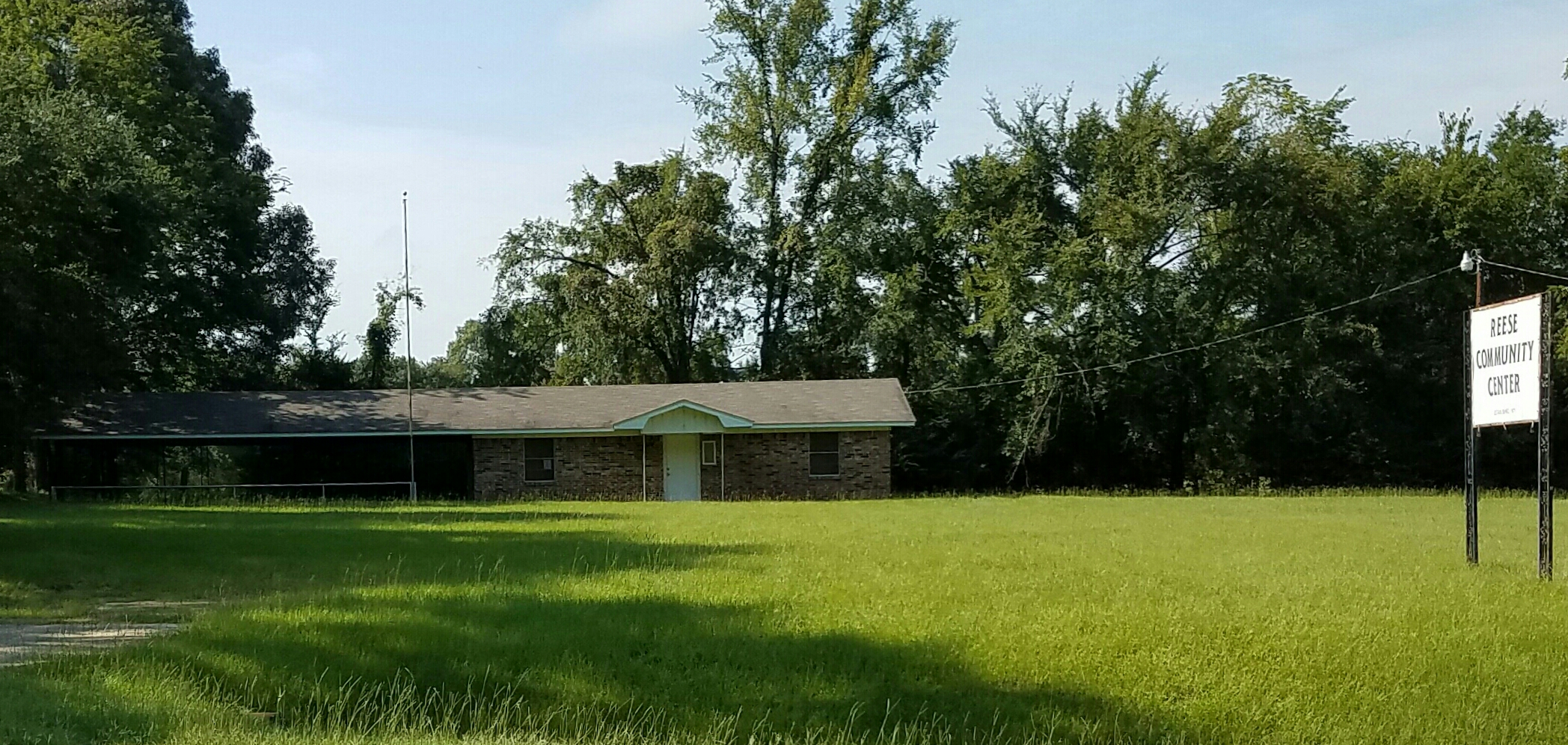
Reese Community Center was originally built as a small brick building, but in later years, a covered pavilion was added onto the east side of the structure.

In the mid-1970s, it was decided to have a community center for the residents of Reese, and by July 1976, one was completed on the grounds of a former school. The Reese Community Center has played host to several parties, dinners, and receptions since. Several times a year, a hamburger supper takes place at the center; this acts as a fund-raiser for the upkeep of both the community's cemetery and the Community Center. Once a year, the Reese Reunion was held there and was a draw for many who called Reese home at one time or another. However, in early 2018, the Community Center was sold due to the cost of maintenance and its general disuse. The funds were added to the Reese Cemetery Association to provide for its upkeep. Future Reese Reunions have been reduced to every other year starting in 2019 and do not have a dedicated venue.

== Education ==
For many years, a school was located in Reese, but by the 1950s, after a long transition, classes were no longer held in the community. Now the area is a part of the Jacksonville Independent School District. The building that once housed the school was razed in the mid-1970s to make way for the construction of the Community Center.
