= Ponta, Texas =

Unincorporated community in Cherokee County, Texas, United States

- Unincorporated community
- Location within the state of Texas Ponta (the United States)
- Coordinates: 31°53′55″N 95°4′37″W
- Country: United States
- State: Texas
- County: Cherokee
- Elevation: 338 ft (103 m)
- Time zone: UTC-6 (Central (CST))
  - Summer (DST): UTC-5 (CDT)
- Area codes: 430, 903
- GNIS feature ID: 2034810

Ponta (pronounced pahn-TAY) is a small unincorporated community in eastern Cherokee County, Texas, United States. According to the Handbook of Texas, the community had a population of 50 in 2000. It is located within the Tyler-Jacksonville combined statistical area.

== History ==
Ponta was originally known as Donaho and was founded in 1901 on the H. Donaho survey. When the Texas and New Orleans Railroad bypassed it, the community was abandoned. The Ponta townsite was established on the railroad by brothers W.T. and L.D. Guinn, along with W.T. Norman. Hubbard Guinn surveyed the land and named it Hubb. Robert Montgomery moved his store from the abandoned Donaho and became postmaster in 1903. He renamed the settlement Ponta for the many bridges that crossed over Mud Creek, since "ponta" is the Latin word for "bridge". A bank was then established, and other businesses followed, such as a gin and crate factory owned by B. Everett, a general store owned by Joe Bailey, Redden's Drugstore, and the Brazier Garage. P.E. Jones became the local physician and a Masonic lodge was built. It then had a Baptist church and a Church of Christ.

The railroad shipped lumber to Ponta until plant farming began in 1925. Many different plants were shipped from Ponta to other states. The community's post office closed in 1972. Mail was sent to the community from Lone Star, Summerfield, and Jacksonville. Ponta declined sharply from a loss of industry. The bank and gin closed, the druggist and doctor died, Dalby's store closed, and the Masonic lodge moved to New Summerfield. Joe Bailey's son, Jim, took over his store, and when he died, Terry Perkins and Willard Wysick became the new owners. The Baptist Church, the Church of Christ, and several scattered houses remained in the 1980s. In 1988, a new store and a beauty parlor opened. Its population was 50 from 1970 through 2000.

== Geography ==
Ponta is located at the intersection of Texas State Highway 110 and Texas State Highway 204, 9 mi (14 km) north of Rusk, 14 mi (23 km) southeast of Jacksonville, 21 mi (34 km) north of Alto, and 6 mi (9.7 km) south of New Summerfield in Cherokee County.

== Education ==
Ponta had its own school in the 20th century and joined the Rusk Independent School District. A store was built near the campus.

== See also ==
- List of unincorporated communities in Texas
