= Cove Springs, Texas =

- Unincorporated community
- Location within the state of Texas Cove Springs (the United States)
- Coordinates: 32°9′35″N 95°20′45″W
- Country: United States
- State: Texas
- County: Cherokee
- Elevation: 653 ft (199 m)
- Time zone: UTC-6 (Central (CST))
  - Summer (DST): UTC-5 (CDT)
- Area codes: 430, 903

Cove Springs is a small unincorporated community in northwestern Cherokee County, Texas, United States. According to the Handbook of Texas, the community had a population of 40 in 2000. It is located within the Tyler-Jacksonville combined statistical area.

== History ==
The area in what is known as Cove Springs today was first settled in the 1850s. It was given the name Cove Springs for a hot spring on the Neches Saline Road, which was a stopping point for travelers. A Methodist Church was established at the turn of the century and a Baptist church was established in 1932. It had both churches, several businesses, and several scattered houses after World War II. People left after the war ended, but it still had two churches and a few businesses in the early 1990s. Its population was 40 in 2000.

== Geography ==
Cove Springs is located along U.S. Highway 175, 18 mi (29 km) northwest of Rusk in northwestern Cherokee County.

== Education ==
Cove Springs had its own school in 1896 and had 23 students enrolled. The area is now part of the Jacksonville Independent School District.

== Government ==
The Earle's Chapel Volunteer Fire Department's Station #2 is located in Cove Springs; it serves Cove Springs and the surrounding area.
