= Shady Grove, Cherokee County, Texas =

Shady Grove, Texas
- Unincorporated community
- Location within Texas Location within the United States
- Coordinates: 31°50′46″N 95°01′27″W
- Country: United States
- State: Texas
- County: Cherokee
- Elevation: 322 ft (98 m)
- Time zone: UTC-6 (Central (CST))
  - Summer (DST): UTC-5 (CDT)
- Area codes: 430 & 903
- GNIS feature ID: 1379059

Shady Grove is an unincorporated community in Cherokee County, located in the U.S. state of Texas. According to the Handbook of Texas, the community had a population of 30 in 2000. It is located within the Tyler-Jacksonville combined statistical area.

== History ==
The area in what is known as Shady Grove today may have been settled sometime after the American Civil War. It had a store and a few scattered houses in the 1930s; in 1936, the population was 20. The store closed after World War II ended. The population remained at 20 in 1990 with a church and some scattered houses. It gained 10 people in 2000.

== Geography ==
Shady Grove is located at the intersection of Farm to Market Road 2962 and U.S. Route 84, 8 mi (13 km) northeast of Rusk in eastern Cherokee County.

== Education ==
Shady Grove had its own school in 1896 and had 26 students enrolled. Today, the community is served by the Rusk Independent School District.
