= Salem, Cherokee County, Texas =

Salem, Texas
- Unincorporated community
- Location within Texas Location within the United States
- Coordinates: 31°45′37″N 95°08′19″W
- Country: United States
- State: Texas
- County: Cherokee
- Elevation: 518 ft (158 m)
- Time zone: UTC-6 (Central (CST))
  - Summer (DST): UTC-5 (CDT)
- Area codes: 430 & 903
- GNIS feature ID: 1379008

Salem is an unincorporated community in Cherokee County, located in the U.S. state of Texas. According to the Handbook of Texas, the community had a population of 20 in 2000. It is located within the Tyler-Jacksonville combined statistical area.

== History ==
The area in what is known as Salem today may have been settled sometime after the American Civil War. A local church acted as the community center. The church, a cemetery, and several scattered houses were located here in the mid-1930s. Most residents left after World War II, but Salem still had a cemetery and a few scattered houses in the 1990s. Joseph T. Cook is buried in the community's cemetery. It had 20 residents in 2000.

== Geography ==
Salem is located on Farm to Market Road 241, 3 mi (4.8 km) south of Rusk, in south-central Cherokee County.

== Education ==
Salem had its own school in 1897 and had 31 students enrolled. It was still operational in the mid-1930s. Today, the community is served by the Rusk Independent School District.
