= Elm Grove, Cherokee County, Texas =

Unincorporated community in Cherokee County, Texas, United States

- Unincorporated community
- Location within Texas Location within the United States
- Coordinates: 31.8718375°N 95.1013317°W
- Country: United States
- State: Texas
- County: Cherokee
- Elevation: 351 ft (107 m)
- Time zone: UTC-6 (Central (CST))
  - Summer (DST): UTC-5 (CDT)
- Area codes: 430 & 903
- GNIS feature ID: 1378256

Elm Grove is an unincorporated community in Cherokee County, Texas, United States. According to the Handbook of Texas, the community had a population of 50 in 2000. It is located within the Tyler-Jacksonville Micropolitan area.

== History ==
Elm Grove was founded sometime before 1900. The community had several stores, three churches, and several homes in the mid-1930s. Many residents left the area, but all three churches and two stores remained in the late 1980s. Its population was 50 in 2000.

== Geography ==
Elm Grove is located on Texas State Highway 110, 6 mi (9.7 km) northeast of Rusk in east-central Cherokee County. It is located 11 miles (18 km) southeast of Jacksonville and 39 miles (63 km) south of Tyler.

== Education ==
Elm Grove had a school in the mid-1930s, which remained in the late 1980s. Today the community is served by the Rusk Independent School District.

== See also ==
- List of unincorporated communities in Texas
