= Pine Grove, Cherokee County, Texas =

- Unincorporated community
- Location within Texas Location within the United States
- Coordinates: 31°52′54″N 95°19′49″W
- Country: United States
- State: Texas
- County: Cherokee
- Elevation: 387 ft (118 m)
- Time zone: UTC-6 (Central (CST))
  - Summer (DST): UTC-5 (CDT)
- Area codes: 430 & 903
- GNIS feature ID: 1380358

Pine Grove is an unincorporated community in Cherokee County, located in the U.S. state of Texas. According to the Handbook of Texas, the community had a population of 30 in 2000. It is located within the Tyler-Jacksonville combined statistical area.

== History ==
Pine Grove today was established in the mid-nineteenth century. Its population decreased after World War II. Its population was 30 in 2000.

== Geography ==
Pine Grove is located at the intersection of Farm to Market Roads 747 and 2138, 12 mi (19 km) northwest of Rusk in western Cherokee County.

== Education ==
Pine Grove had its own school in 1896 and had 88 students. It was still standing in the mid-1930s and early-1990s. Today, the community is served by the Jacksonville Independent School District.
