= Blackjack, Cherokee County, Texas =

Unincorporated community in Cherokee County, Texas, United States

Blackjack, Texas
- Unincorporated community
- Location within Texas Location within the United States
- Coordinates: 32°03′04″N 95°06′16″W
- Country: United States
- State: Texas
- County: Cherokee
- Elevation: 430 ft (130 m)
- Time zone: UTC-6 (Central (CST))
  - Summer (DST): UTC-5 (CDT)
- Area codes: 430 & 903
- GNIS feature ID: 1378012

Blackjack is an unincorporated community in Cherokee County, Texas, United States. According to the Handbook of Texas, the community had a population of 47 in 2000. It is located within the Tyler-Jacksonville combined statistical area.

== History ==
Robert Graves Stadler settled here in the 1840s from South Carolina and was also a Texas Revolution veteran. His nieces and nephews followed alongside other relatives and named the community Blackjack for the blackjack trees in the area. Blackjack Baptist Church was organized in 1875. The community grew when John W. Gray and Tom Upchurch opened a store here in 1916. Blackjack had two stores, a cotton gin, a garage, a church, and 100 residents at its zenith. The last store in the community closed in 1961 and the population declined to 75 by 1966. It had a church and several scattered houses in 1990 and a population of 47 in 2000.

== Geography ==
Blackjack is located at the intersection of Farm to Market Road 2750 and Texas State Highway 110, 18 mi (29 km) northeast of Rusk, 5 mi (8.0 km) north of New Summerfield, 13 mi (21 km) northeast of Jacksonville, 19 mi (31 km) southwest of Henderson, and 7 mi (11 km) south of Troup in northeastern Cherokee County.

== Education ==
Blackjack had a log schoolhouse built around the time of the American Civil War and was still standing after World War I. After World War II, it joined the Troup Independent School District.

== Notable person ==
- Bob Luman, country and rockabilly singer-songwriter

== See also ==
- List of unincorporated communities in Texas
