= Oakland, Cherokee County, Texas =

Unincorporated community in Cherokee County, Texas, United States

Oakland, Texas
- Unincorporated community
- Location within Texas Location within the United States
- Coordinates: 31°48′52″N 95°13′10″W
- Country: United States
- State: Texas
- County: Cherokee
- Elevation: 410 ft (120 m)
- Time zone: UTC-6 (Central (CST))
  - Summer (DST): UTC-5 (CDT)
- Area codes: 430 & 903
- GNIS feature ID: 1378781

Oakland is an unincorporated community in Cherokee County, Texas, United States. According to the Handbook of Texas, the community had a population of 50 in 2000. It is located within the Tyler-Jacksonville combined statistical area.

== History ==
The area in what is known as Oakland today may have been settled sometime after the Civil War. There was a church, a store, and a few scattered houses in Oakland in the 1930s. The store closed after World War II. Only a church, a cemetery, and several scattered houses remained in 1990. Its population was 50 in 2000.

== Geography ==
Oakland is located on Farm to Market Road 347, 4 mi (6.4 km) west of Rusk in central Cherokee County.

== Education ==
Oakland had its own school in 1896 and had 46 students enrolled. It was still operational in the 1930s. It joined the Rusk Independent School District after World War II.

== See also ==
- List of unincorporated communities in Texas
