= New Hope, Cherokee County, Texas =

New Hope, Texas
- Unincorporated community
- Location within Texas Location within the United States
- Coordinates: 31°55′25″N 95°18′31″W
- Country: United States
- State: Texas
- County: Cherokee
- Elevation: 489 ft (149 m)
- Time zone: UTC-6 (Central (CST))
  - Summer (DST): UTC-5 (CDT)
- Area codes: 430 & 903
- GNIS feature ID: 1380891

New Hope is an unincorporated community in Cherokee County, located in the U.S. state of Texas. According to the Handbook of Texas, the community had a population of 50 in 2000. It is located within the Tyler-Jacksonville combined statistical area.

== History ==
The area in what is known as New Hope today was first settled in the 1850s and was also known as Gum Creek. New Hope Baptist Church was founded during the Civil War and was the focus of the community. J.W. Linkenhoker built a store near the church sometime after World War I ended and which remained operational in the 1920s. There was one business and only seven residents that next decade. The church and several scattered houses remained in New Hope in the early 1990s and the community had a population of 50 in 2000.

== Geography ==
New Hope is located on Farm to Market Road 747, 13 mi (21 km) northwest of Rusk in central Cherokee County.

== Education ==
New Hope Baptist Church served as a school until another one was built in 1897. It joined the Jacksonville Independent School District in 1973 and burned to the ground in 1984.
