= Texas State Highway 204 =

Highway in Texas

State Highway 204
- SH 204, highlighted in red

Route information
- Maintained by TxDOT
- Length: 37.918 mi (61.023 km)
- Existed: by 1934–present

Major junctions
- West end: US 79 in Jacksonville
- US 84 in Reklaw
- East end: US 259 north of Nacogdoches

Location
- Country: United States
- State: Texas

Highway system
- Highways in Texas; Interstate; US; State; Former; Toll; Loops; Spurs; FM/RM; Park; Rec
| ← SH 203 | → SH 205 |

State Highway 204 (SH 204) is a Texas state highway running from Jacksonville southeast to US 259 north of Nacogdoches. This route was designated on May 15, 1934, replacing the east leg of SH 110 from US 259 north of Nacogdoches to SH 110. On October 31, 1958, SH 204 was extended west to its current end in Jacksonville.

== Route description ==
SH 204 begins at a junction with US 79 in Jacksonville. It heads southeast from this junction through Jacksonville to an intersection with Loop 456. The highway continues to the southeast through the northern outskirts of Gallatin to an intersection with SH 110 in Ponta. Heading towards the southeast, the highway continues to a junction with Loop 142. The highway continues to the southeast to an intersection with FM 2274. It continues to the southeast to a junction with FM 235. As the highway continues to the southeast, it intersects US 84 in Reklaw. It heads southeast from this junction to an intersection with FM 1648. The highway continues to the southeast to an intersection with FM 225 in Cushing. Heading towards the southeast, the highway continues to a junction with FM 2783. SH 204 reaches its eastern terminus at US 259.

== Junction list ==
| County | Location | mi | km | Destinations | Notes |
|---|---|---|---|---|---|
| Cherokee | Jacksonville | | | US 79 – Jacksonville, Henderson | SH 204 signage also includes signs for Loop 456 facing southbound US 79 as well as with the first SH 204 reassurance sign eastbound |
| Cherokee | Jacksonville | | | Loop 456 | |
| Cherokee | Ponta | | | SH 110 – New Summerfield, Rusk | |
| Cherokee | Ponta | | | Loop 142 | |
| Cherokee | Ponta | | | FM 2274 | |
| Cherokee | | | | FM 235 – New Summerfield | intersection just northwest of Reklaw |
| Rusk | Reklaw | | | US 84 – Mount Enterprise, Rusk | |
| Nacogdoches | | | | FM 1648 | in the community of Sacul, which is likely unsigned |
| Nacogdoches | Cushing | | | FM 225 – Henderson, Douglass | |
| Nacogdoches | | | | FM 2783 | intersection just east of Cushing |
| Nacogdoches | | | | US 259 – Henderson, Nacogdoches | picnic area within the intersection |
1.000 mi = 1.609 km; 1.000 km = 0.621 mi
