= Craft, Texas =

- Unincorporated community
- Location within the state of Texas Craft (the United States)
- Coordinates: 31°55′6″N 95°14′8″W
- Country: United States
- State: Texas
- County: Cherokee
- Elevation: 495 ft (151 m)
- Time zone: UTC-6 (Central (CST))
  - Summer (DST): UTC-5 (CDT)
- Area codes: 430, 903

Craft is a small unincorporated community in central Cherokee County, Texas, United States. According to the Handbook of Texas, the community had a population of 21 in 2000. It is located within the Tyler-Jacksonville combined statistical area.

== History ==
A post office was established at Craft in 1891 and remained in operation until 1929, with Thomas J. Craft as postmaster. Both the community and post office were named after him. Rusk Transportation was the first railroad that was built through the area, connecting it to Rusk to the southeast and Jacksonville to the north in 1875. It then became known as the Kansas and Gulf Short Line in 1881. The St. Louis, Arkansas and Texas Railway bought it in 1887 and subsequently joined the St. Louis Southwestern Railway four years later. A carload of tomatoes was shipped there on June 14, 1897. This made the community very successful for the next few decades. Its population was recorded at 10 in 1896, then grew to 50 in 1925. It had a post office, a depot, a church, two general stores, and two sheds for packing tomatoes at its zenith. Craft's population went down to 21 from 1972 through 2000, when the area became urbanized and farming gave way. It had a church, a store, and several scattered houses in the mid-1980s. The community received a Texas Historical Marker in 1985 at its original townsite.

== Geography ==
Craft is located along U.S. Highway 69, 2 mi (3.2 km) south of Jacksonville in northern Cherokee County.

== Education ==
Craft had its own school with three teachers employed. The area is now part of the Jacksonville Independent School District.
