= Circle, Cherokee County, Texas =

- Unincorporated community
- Location within Texas Location within the United States
- Coordinates: 31°48′5″N 95°00′32″W
- Country: United States
- State: Texas
- County: Cherokee
- Elevation: 325 ft (99 m)
- Time zone: UTC-6 (Central (CST))
  - Summer (DST): UTC-5 (CDT)
- Area codes: 430 & 903
- GNIS feature ID: 1378123

Circle is an unincorporated community in Cherokee County, located in the U.S. state of Texas. According to the Handbook of Texas, there were no population estimates available for the community in 2000. It is located within the Tyler-Jacksonville combined statistical area.

== Geography ==
Circle is located on Farm to Market Road 2962, 8 mi (13 km) east of Rusk in eastern Cherokee County.

== Education ==
Circle had its own school in the early 1990s. Today, the community is served by the Rusk Independent School District.
