= Henry's Chapel, Texas =

- Unincorporated community
- Location within Texas Location within the United States
- Coordinates: 32°6′24″N 95°02′33″W
- Country: United States
- State: Texas
- County: Cherokee
- Elevation: 387 ft (118 m)
- Time zone: UTC-6 (Central (CST))
  - Summer (DST): UTC-5 (CDT)
- Area codes: 430 & 903
- GNIS feature ID: 2034719

Henry's Chapel is an unincorporated community in Cherokee County, located in the U.S. state of Texas. According to the Handbook of Texas, the community had a population of 75 in 2000. It is located within the Tyler-Jacksonville combined statistical area.

== History ==
The area in what is known as Henry's Chapel today may have been settled by people from Arkansas in the early 1820s, who named it for a local church. It had two churches, two stores, and 75 residents in the mid-1930s. One of the stores and both churches closed, but it gained another church in the early 1990s. The population remained at 75 from 1990 through 2000.

== Geography ==
Henry's Chapel is located at the intersection of Farm to Market Roads 13 and 856, 23 mi (37 km) northeast of Rusk in northeastern Cherokee County.

== Education ==
Henry's Chapel had its own school in 1897 and had 27 students. Today, the community is served by the Carlisle Independent School District.
