= Dialville, Texas =

Unincorporated community in Cherokee County, Texas, United States

- Unincorporated community
- Location within the state of Texas Dialville (the United States)
- Coordinates: 31°51′27″N 95°13′50″W
- Country: United States
- State: Texas
- County: Cherokee
- Elevation: 486 ft (148 m)
- Time zone: UTC-6 (Central (CST))
  - Summer (DST): UTC-5 (CDT)
- Area codes: 430, 903

Dialville is a small unincorporated community in north-central Cherokee County, Texas, United States. According to the Handbook of Texas, the community had a population of 200 in 2000. It is located within the Tyler-Jacksonville combined statistical area.

== History ==
The area in what is known as Dialville today was first settled in the late 1840s and was part of Beverly Pool's three-league grant. The community itself was not founded until John Dial opened a store on the Kansas and Short Gulf Line Railroad in 1883. It was originally known as Dial. A post office was established at Dialville in 1885 and was closed a year later. It reopened when John Thomas Bailey opened a store here in 1897 while the other one closed, and the community was a stop on the railroad. C.D. Jarrett then moved to Dialville and turned it into a shipping point for tomatoes, peaches, and other produce around 1900. Its population was 400 in 1915 and had two churches, a bank, and a newspaper titled the Dialville News. A theater was opened by L.E. Scott the next year and another newspaper called the Dialville Reporter was established. It began to decline that next decade and lost half of its population by the early 1930s, causing many of the stores and businesses to close. Only two churches and one store remained by the late 1980s. The population remained at 200 with three businesses in 2000.

John Dial had moved to the area with 60 other wagons and farmed the land when he arrived. Dial and his wife, Ida Mae Jones, deeded 8 acres (3.2 ha) of land for the railroad depot. Today, the community remains as an important part of the county's regional and agricultural history.

== Geography ==
Dialville is located on Farm to Market Road 347, 6 mi (9.7 km) northwest of Rusk and 5 mi (8.0 km) southeast of Jacksonville in central Cherokee County.

== Education ==
Dialville School was established in 1899 and was still standing in 1915. In 1959, it joined the Jacksonville Independent School District.

== See also ==
- List of unincorporated communities in Texas
