= Linwood, Texas =

- Unincorporated community
- Location within Texas Location within the United States
- Coordinates: 31°39′52″N 94°59′26″W
- Country: United States
- State: Texas
- County: Cherokee
- Elevation: 295 ft (90 m)
- Time zone: UTC-6 (Central (CST))
  - Summer (DST): UTC-5 (CDT)
- Area codes: 430 & 903
- GNIS feature ID: 1361248

Linwood is an unincorporated community in Cherokee County, located in the U.S. state of Texas. According to the Handbook of Texas, the community had a population of 40 in 2000. It is located within the Tyler-Jacksonville combined statistical area.

== History ==
Joseph Durst and his wife Delilah were the first settlers in Linwood sometime before 1832. Another community named Lockranzie developed a half mile east of the community, but the post office moved to Linwood in 1851. It was platted by James H. Durst and Ann Harrison Terrell, promoting it as a port along the Angelina River. Navigation along the river failed and the community grew sharply. Charles Chevallier, Henry Raguet and his brother (also named Charles) relocated here from Nacogdoches and opened stores here in the 1850s. Other early settlers included R.W. Mitchell, George Whitfield Terrell, and his son George B. Terrell. The Kansas and Gulf Short Line Railroad bypassed Linwood in the early 1880s, causing most of its businesses and residents to relocate to nearby Alto. The post office shut down in 1903 and the community had two businesses, a church, and ten residents in 1936. The last businesses closed, and the population went up to 40 from 1990 through 2000.

== Geography ==
Linwood is located at the intersection of Texas State Highway 21 and Farm to Market Road 241, 12 mi (19 km) southeast of Rusk in southeastern Cherokee County.

== Education ==
Linwood had its own school in 1936. Today, the community is served by the Alto Independent School District.
