= Texas State Highway 110 =

State highway in Texas

State Highway 110
- SH 110, highlighted in red

Route information
- Maintained by TxDOT
- Length: 77.34 mi (124.47 km)
- Existed: by 1933–present

Major junctions
- South end: US 84 at Rusk
- US 79 at New Summerfield; US 69 at Tyler; I-20 near Van
- North end: US 80 at Grand Saline

Location
- Country: United States
- State: Texas

Highway system
- Highways in Texas; Interstate; US; State; Former; Toll; Loops; Spurs; FM/RM; Park; Rec
← I-110	→ SH 111

State Highway 110 (SH 110) is a state highway in the U.S. state of Texas that runs from Grand Saline to Rusk.

== Route description ==
SH 110 begins at an intersection with US 84 and Loop 62 in downtown Rusk and leaves the courthouse square north with US 84, crossing US 69 on its way to a split on the northeast side of Rusk where US 84 goes off east and SH 110 turns north, out of town. The road intersects with SH 204 in Ponta. The road intersects with U.S. Highway 79 in New Summerfield before crossing the county line into Smith County as it enters Troup. After a brief downtown multiplex with SH 135, SH 110 leaves Troup going northwest through Whitehouse on its way to Tyler. SH 110 swings around the downtown area to the south and west by way of multiplexes with SH 64, SH 155, and US 69. After splitting with US 69, SH 110 leaves Tyler toward the northwest. After several miles, SH 110 crosses I-20 south of Garden Valley. Just after Garden Valley, the road multiplexes with FM 16 and goes west into Van Zandt County. SH 110 splits with FM 16 in Van and turns back north. Approaching Grand Saline, SH 110 merges with FM 17 and travels the remaining several blocks multiplexed until it reaches US 80, the northern terminus of SH 110.

== History ==
SH 110 was originally designated on July 17, 1925 on a route from SH 26 north of Nacogdoches northwest to the Cherokee county line. On September 17, 1929, it was extended northwest to New Summerfield. On March 19, 1930, it was extended to Tyler, replacing SH 37A. On August 4, 1932, a branch to Rusk was added (formerly part of SH 43A), along with its original route and a planned connection between the routes at New Summerfield. The branch to Rusk was not added to the state highway log until November 30, 1932. On May 15, 1934, the original portion had been renumbered as SH 204, leaving the routing from Rusk to Tyler. On June 16, 1936, SH 110 extended to Van. On December 22, 1936, SH 110 was extended west via Canton to Kaufman. Of February 10, 1937, the section from Van to Kaufman was renumbered as SH 243, and SH 110 rerouted northwest to Grand Saline, completing its current routing. An extension northward to Alba was added on May 21, 1940, but the section from Grand Saline to Alba was redesignated as FM 17 on March 26, 1942.

== Major intersections ==
County	Location	mi	km	Destinations	Notes
Cherokee	Rusk	0.00	0.00	US 84 – Reklaw, Maydelle	
Cherokee				SH 204 – Reklaw, Gallatin	
Cherokee	New Summerfield			US 79 – Henderson, Jacksonville	
Smith	Troup			SH 135 north – Arp, Kilgore	Eastern end of SH 135 concurrency
Smith	Troup			SH 135 – Jacksonville	Western end of SH 135 concurrency
Smith				Loop 49 west – Tyler	Eastern terminus of Loop 49
Smith	Tyler			Loop 323	
Smith	Tyler			SH 64 east / SH 155 north – Arp, Winona	Eastern end of SH 64/SH 155 concurrency
Smith	Tyler			US 69 south – Bullard, Jacksonville	Southern end of US 69 concurrency
Smith	Tyler			SH 155 south – Noonday, Palestine	Western end of SH 155 concurrency
Smith	Tyler			SH 31 (E Front Street) – Kilgore, Athens	
Smith	Tyler			SH 64 west – Canton	Western end of SH 64 concurrency
Smith	Tyler			Spur 147 east	Western terminus of Spur 147
Smith	Tyler			US 69 north – Lindale, Mineola	Northern end of US 69 concurrency
Smith	Tyler			Loop 323	
Smith				I-20 – Dallas, Longview	I-20 exit 548.
Van Zandt	Grand Saline			US 80 – Edgewood, Mineola	
1.000 mi = 1.609 km; 1.000 km = 0.621 mi: Concurrency terminus
