= Ironton, Texas =

- Unincorporated community
- Location within Texas Location within the United States
- Coordinates: 31°54′48″N 95°22′25″W
- Country: United States
- State: Texas
- County: Cherokee
- Elevation: 472 ft (144 m)
- Time zone: UTC-6 (Central (CST))
  - Summer (DST): UTC-5 (CDT)
- Area codes: 430 & 903
- GNIS feature ID: 1379988

Ironton is an unincorporated community in Cherokee County, located in the U.S. state of Texas. According to the Handbook of Texas, the community had a population of 110 in 2000. It is located within the Tyler-Jacksonville combined statistical area.

== History ==
C.H. Martin named the town for the ruins of a nearby iron manufacturing plant and promoted settlement in the area in 1904. That same year, a post office was established, and Charley J. Pool deeded land grants. Two years later, a gristmill and cotton gin were established by Louis A. Pritchett. A blacksmith shop and a garage were built south of the gin. A plunge dip was built to help establish a Babesiosis program. U.S. Highway 79 was routed east of the International-Great Northern Railroad and bypassed Ironton toward Palestine. The last store in the community burned to the ground in 1930 and another was built on the east side of the highway. Edgar W. Brittain took over and opened a service station in 1931, operating both until 1968 and serving as postmaster until mail was transferred to Jacksonville in 1955. It only had one church and no businesses in 1990 and had a population of 110 through 2000.

== Geography ==
Ironton is located on U.S Highway 79, 6 mi (9.7 km) southwest of Jacksonville and 4 mi (6.4 km) northeast of the Anderson County line in northwestern Cherokee County.

== Education ==
George N. Harris served as the first teacher at Ironton School in 1910. Children had originally attended school in either Owl's Creek Chapel or Earle's Chapel. Student enrollment declined during World War II and students were bussed to Jacksonville Independent School District in 1954.
