= Sweet Union, Texas =

- Unincorporated community
- Location within Texas Location within the United States
- Coordinates: 31°29′21″N 95°1′49″W
- Country: United States
- State: Texas
- County: Cherokee
- Elevation: 240 ft (73 m)
- Time zone: UTC-6 (Central (CST))
  - Summer (DST): UTC-5 (CDT)
- Area codes: 430 & 903
- GNIS feature ID: 2034900

Sweet Union is an unincorporated community in Cherokee County, located in the U.S. state of Texas. According to the Handbook of Texas, the community had a population of 40 in 2000. It is located within the Tyler-Jacksonville combined statistical area.

== Geography ==
Sweet Union is located on Farm to Market Road 1247 near Larrison Creek, 22 mi (35 km) south of Rusk in southern Cherokee County.

== Education ==
Sweet Union had a combination school and church in 1887. It was still standing in the 1930s. Since 1964, the community has been served by the Wells Independent School District.
