= Central High, Texas =

- Unincorporated community
- Location within Texas Location within the United States
- Coordinates: 31°42′24″N 95°03′14″W
- Country: United States
- State: Texas
- County: Cherokee
- Elevation: 535 ft (163 m)
- Time zone: UTC-6 (Central (CST))
  - Summer (DST): UTC-5 (CDT)
- Area codes: 430 & 903
- GNIS feature ID: 2034644

Central High is an unincorporated community in Cherokee County, located in the U.S. state of Texas. According to the Handbook of Texas, the community had a population of 30 in 2000. It is located within the Tyler-Jacksonville combined statistical area.

== History ==
The area in what is known as Central High today was first settled in the early 1900s. It had a store and a Baptist church in 1919. The community center opened on May 12, 1963. The population was only 30 in 2000.

== Geography ==
Central High is located on Farm to Market Road 851, 4 mi (6.4 km) northeast of Alto in southeastern Cherokee County.
