= Cody Glenn =

American football player (born 1986)

No. 52
- Position: Linebacker

Personal information
- Born: October 6, 1986 (age 40); Rusk, Texas, U.S.
- Listed height: 6 ft 0 in (1.83 m)
- Listed weight: 240 lb (109 kg)

Career information
- High school: Rusk
- College: Nebraska
- NFL draft: 2009: 5th round, 158th overall pick

Career history
- Washington Redskins (2009)*; Indianapolis Colts (2009–2011); Baltimore Ravens (2012)*
- * Offseason or practice squad member only

Career NFL statistics
- Total tackles: 24
- Stats at Pro Football Reference

Cody Glenn (born October 6, 1986) is an American former professional football player who was a linebacker in the National Football League (NFL). He was selected by the Washington Redskins in the fifth round of the 2009 NFL draft. He played college football for the Nebraska Cornhuskers.

Glenn was also a member of the Indianapolis Colts and Baltimore Ravens.

== Early life ==
Glenn played high school football at Rusk High School. He was originally a running back who only switched to linebacker in his 4th year at Nebraska. In his four years in high school, he rushed for 6,353 yards and 87 touchdowns. His total rushing yards rank eighth in Texas Class 3A history and 27th overall in the entire state of Texas.

== College career ==
In 2008 Glenn moved from running back to linebacker and in nine games, he racked up 51 tackles, including six tackles for loss and four pass breakups. In 2007, he played in five games and finished with 27 carries for 78 yards and also finished the year with six catches for 52 yards. In 2006, he gained 370 yards and scored a team-high eight touchdowns. In 2005, he was as a short-yardage back and finished with 131 yards and four touchdowns on 45 carries.

== Professional career ==
=== Washington Redskins ===
Glenn was selected by the Washington Redskins in the fifth round, with the 158th overall pick, in the 2009 NFL draft. The Redskins waived him on September 5, 2009.

=== Indianapolis Colts ===
On September 6, 2009, Glenn was claimed off waivers by the Indianapolis Colts. The team waived him on September 15, but signed him to the practice squad two days later.

=== Baltimore Ravens ===
Glenn signed a futures contract with Baltimore Ravens on January 26, 2012. He was waived by the team on June 13.

== Personal life ==
Glenn did a promotional video for Trinity Mother Frances Health System, where he had both shoulders surgically repaired from dislocations during his high school career.
