= Morrill, Texas =

Coordinates: 31°35′38″N 95°03′53″W

Morrill is an unincorporated area that formerly held a distinct community in Cherokee County, Texas, United States. The site is along Farm to Market Road 1911 near Rusk.
