= Ironton =

Ironton is the name of several places in the United States:

- Ironton, Arkansas
- Ironton, Colorado
- Ironton, Indiana
- Ironton, Louisiana
- Ironton, Michigan
- Ironton, Minnesota
- Ironton, Missouri
- Ironton, Montana
- Ironton, New York
- Ironton, Ohio
- Ironton, Pennsylvania
- Ironton, Texas
- Ironton, Utah
- Ironton, Wisconsin:
  - Ironton, Wisconsin
  - Ironton (town), Wisconsin
- Oxmoor, Alabama, also known as Ironton
- Ironton Creek in Crow Wing County, Minnesota
- Ironton Flats in Madera County, California
- Ironton Hollow in Iron County, Missouri
- Ironton Ridge in Reynolds County, Missouri
- Irontone Springs in Otsego County, Michigan
