= Fred Lowery =

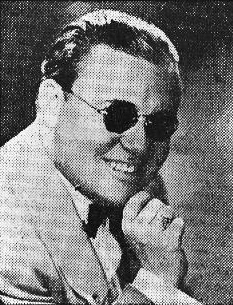
- Fred Lowery in a 1944 advertisement
- Born: 2 November 1909; Palestine, Texas, United States
- Died: 11 December 1984 (aged 75); Jacksonville, Texas, United States
- Occupation: Whistler
- Musical career
- Labels: Columbia; Decca; Gra-Low; Word

Signature
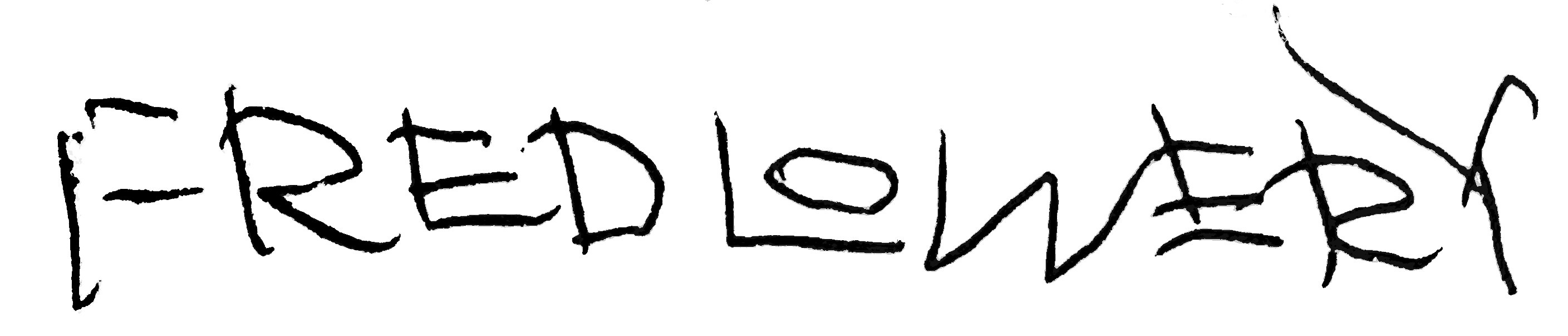

Fred Lowery (2 November 1909 – 11 December 1984) was a blind professional whistler who recorded a No. 9 Billboard chart hit version of "The High and the Mighty" with conductor and arranger LeRoy Holmes. Lowery whistled with bandleaders Horace Heidt and Vincent Lopez in the 1930s and 40s. His 'Silent Night' and 'William Tell Overture' demonstrate the difference between everyday whistling and puccalo.

== Early life ==
Lowery was born in Palestine, Texas, a small city in East Texas to parents William and Mary (White) Lowery. Mary died soon after Fred's birth, and William abandoned him and his sisters at a railroard depot in Gould, Texas. His grandma, Lucy White, and Mary's brother, Ed, raised them. lost his eyesight at the age of two after being stricken with scarlet fever. With an artificial right eye and limited vision in the left, Fred Lowery was legally blind – not totally blind.

From the age of eight he was educated at the Texas School for the Blind and Visually Impaired in Austin, Texas. That same year, Fred learned how to whistle from copying Ed while we was whistling while farming. In 1929, when he was attending school, he met a bird imitator named Ernest Nichols, who was visiting the school. "He encouraged me," he recalled, "and I began to discover there was more to whistling than bird calls." Lowery's piano teacher, Peggy Richter, also encouraged the boy and had Lowery whistle the songs she taught him on piano.

== Career ==
Richter was fired by the school's principal, who was jealous of both her and Lowery's quick success due to his own failed singing career. After that, Lowery moved into Richter's family in Dallas, Texas where she found a new job and he continued performing locally. After a series of minor successes, including a radio show on WFAA in Dallas, and a 4 1/2-year engagement with the Vincent Lopez orchestra in New York City, he was heard by Horace Heidt. Heidt gave Lowery his chance for national recognition as a featured part of his show. In 1945, Lowery struck out on his own. His 1939 version of the song Indian Love Call sold over 2 million copies. During his career, he performed at Carnegie Hall and at the White House.

== Later Life ==
He married Gracie Johnson in 1940, a nurse from Jacksonville, Texas. He had a son, Fred Jr. in 1941. He became friends with fellow whistler and singer Bing Crosby, along with Jack Dempsey, a boxing champion.

The Lowery family moved to Gracie's hometown, where they had a quiet life overall. Fred would perform at over 20,000 schools in his later life. He wrote a biography, 'Whistling In The Dark' in 1983, and died in Jacksonville on December 11th, 1984.

== Discography ==
William Tell Overture – Columbia 35234 (WB 24992) 10" 78 (1939)

Listen to the Mocking Bird – Columbia 35234 (WB 24940) 10" 78 (1939)

Whistling For You – Columbia C-148 10" 78 (1947)

Whistling For You – Columbia CL 6091 10" LP (1950)

Walking Along Kicking the Leaves, Fred Lowery whistling with orchestra directed by Own Bradley – Decca DL 8476 LP Mono (1957)

Whistle a Happy Tune – Decca DL 8995 LP Mono (1960)

Fred Lowery Sings for the Birds – Lowery ED1001 LP Mono

There'll Be Whistling and Singing in Heaven – Gra-Low GR-7100 LP Mono

A Family Christmas – Gra-Low GR-7101 LP Mono

Fred Lowery Whistles Your Gospel Favorites – Word WST-8326 LP Stereo (1967)

Abide With Me – Word WST-8456 LP Stereo (1968)

Precious Memories – Word WST-8516 LP Stereo (1971)

It is Well with My Soul – Word WST-8563 LP Stereo (1972)
