= Rusk High School =

Location
- 203 East 7th Street; Rusk, Texas 75785; United States; 31.780368°N 95.143694°W

Information
- Type: Public high school
- School district: Rusk Independent School District
- Principal: Trevor Rogers
- Teaching staff: 44.97 (FTE)
- Grades: 9-12
- Enrollment: 621 (2024–2025)
- Student to teacher ratio: 13.81
- Colors: Red and black
- Team name: Eagles
- Website: Official website

Rusk High School is a public high school located in Rusk, Texas, United States. It is the sole high school in the Rusk Independent School District. For the 2021–2022 school year, the school was given a "C" by the Texas Education Agency.

== Athletics ==
The Rusk Eagles compete in these sports:

- Baseball
- Basketball
- Football
- Golf
- Powerlifting
- Softball
- Tennis
- Track and field
- Volleyball
- Marching band
