= Pierces Chapel, Texas =

- Unincorporated community
- Location within Texas Location within the United States
- Coordinates: 31°52′44″N 95°22′34″W
- Country: United States
- State: Texas
- County: Cherokee
- Elevation: 423 ft (129 m)
- Time zone: UTC-6 (Central (CST))
  - Summer (DST): UTC-5 (CDT)
- Area codes: 430 & 903
- GNIS feature ID: 1889542

Pierces Chapel (also Pierce's Chapel) is an unincorporated community in Cherokee County, Texas, United States.

== History ==
Pierces Chapel is on Farm to Market Road 747, 14 miles northwest of Rusk, Texas. The community was named for the Methodist church in the community which was named for Bishop George Foster Pierce of the Methodist Episcopal Church, who preached there, when he was going to the annual Texas state conference of the Methodist Episcopal Church.
