= Maydelle, Texas =

- Unincorporated community
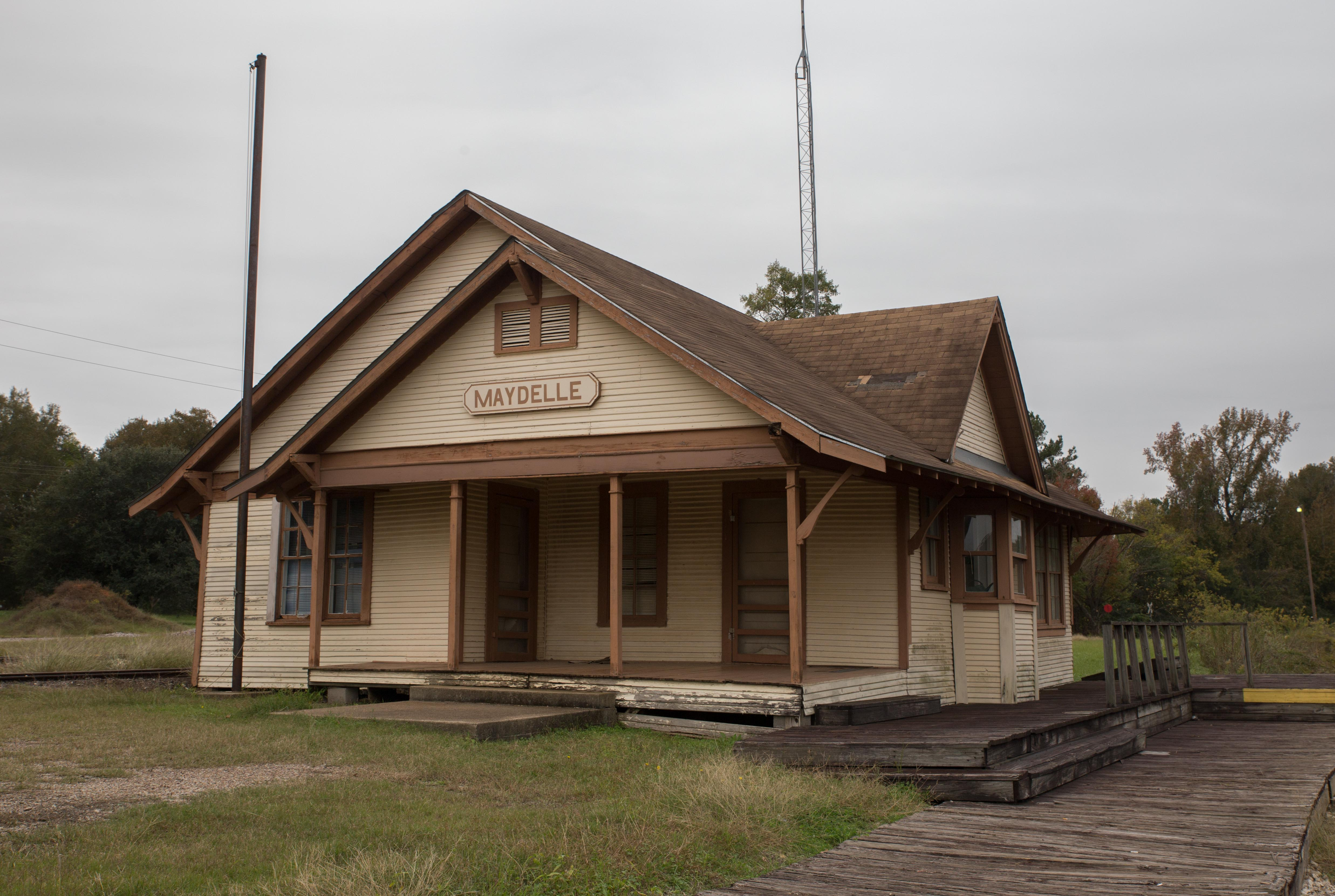
- Train depot

- Location within the state of Texas Maydelle (the United States)
- Coordinates: 31°48′3″N 95°18′9″W
- Country: United States
- State: Texas
- County: Cherokee
- Elevation: 410 ft (120 m)
- Time zone: UTC-6 (Central (CST))
  - Summer (DST): UTC-5 (CDT)
- Area codes: 430, 903
- GNIS feature ID: 1362318

Maydelle is a small unincorporated community in Cherokee County, Texas, United States. According to the Handbook of Texas, the community had a population of 250 in 2000. It is located within the Tyler-Jacksonville combined statistical area.

== History ==
The area in what is known as Maydelle today was first settled in the 1840s. It did not develop into a community until the Texas State Railroad built a track through the area in 1906. A nearby prison called Camp Wright housed convicts who were assigned to cut wood to make charcoal for a prison iron foundry in Rusk. C.D. Jarrarr, N.A. Slover, and J.S. Sherman were given land grants surrounding the prison, and built a new townsite there in 1910. They named it Maydelle for Maydelle Campbell, who was the daughter of former Texas governor Thomas Mitchell Campbell. She sang during the opening of the townsite. Most people from the surrounding communities of Gent, Java, Mount Comfort, and Pine Town settled here. In 1914, the community had 150 residents, Baptist and Christian churches, four general stores, a bank, a cotton gin, and a drugstore. It reached its population zenith of 450 in 1929. The Great Depression caused the population of Maydelle to plunge back to 150, but made a comeback after World War II. The population grew to 250 in the early 1990s, with six businesses, and remained at that level through 2000. It became a popular tourist destination for people who wanted to ride on the restored Texas State Railroad.

== Geography ==
Maydelle is located at the intersection of U.S. Route 84 and Farm to Market Road 2138, 9 mi (14 km) west of Rusk in west-central Cherokee County. It is also located 22 mi (35 km) east of Palestine.

=== Climate ===
The climate in this area is characterized by hot, humid summers and generally mild to cool winters. According to the Köppen climate classification, Maydelle has a humid subtropical climate, Cfa on climate maps.

== Education ==
On July 1, 1989, the Maydelle Independent School District merged into the Rusk Independent School District.

== In popular culture ==
The James Garner and Joan Hackett movie The Long Summer of George Adams was filmed in Maydelle.
