= Gould, Texas =

- Unincorporated community
- Location within Texas Location within the United States
- Coordinates: 32°03′21″N 95°09′03″W
- Country: United States
- State: Texas
- County: Cherokee
- Elevation: 351 ft (107 m)
- Time zone: UTC-6 (Central (CST))
  - Summer (DST): UTC-5 (CDT)
- Area codes: 430 & 903
- GNIS feature ID: 1378372

Gould is an unincorporated community in Cherokee County, located in the U.S. state of Texas. According to the Handbook of Texas, the community had a population of 20 in 2000. It is located within the Tyler-Jacksonville combined statistical area.

== History ==
The area in what is known as Gould today was first settled in the 1870s and was a station on the International-Great Northern Railroad. A post office was established at Gould in 1905 and remained in operation until 1918. It had 80 residents that were served by a sawmill and a general store in 1914, which remained open until the 1930s and closed after World War II. Its population was 20 in 2000.

== Geography ==
Gould is located at the intersection of Farm to Market Roads 2064 and 2750, 18 mi (29 km) north of Rusk in northern Cherokee County.

== Education ==
Gould is served by the Troup Independent School District.
