= Concord, Texas =

Concord, Texas may refer to:

- Concord, Cherokee County, Texas
- Concord, Leon County, Texas
- Concord, Rusk County, Texas

== See also ==
- Concord (disambiguation)
