= Concord, Cherokee County, Texas =

Concord, Texas
- Unincorporated community
- Location within Texas Location within the United States
- Coordinates: 32°04′13″N 95°02′47″W
- Country: United States
- State: Texas
- County: Cherokee
- Elevation: 413 ft (126 m)
- Time zone: UTC-6 (Central (CST))
  - Summer (DST): UTC-5 (CDT)
- Area codes: 430 & 903
- GNIS feature ID: 1378149

Concord is an unincorporated community in Cherokee County, located in the U.S. state of Texas. According to the Handbook of Texas, the community had a population of 50 in 2000. It is located within the Tyler-Jacksonville combined statistical area.

== History ==
The area in what is known as Concord today may have been settled by people from Concord, Massachusetts. It was also settled by a family from Tennessee circa 1850. In the 1930s and 1940s, mail was sent to the community from Jacksonville, then Troup. It had 20 residents served by only one business in 1930 and grew to have 50 residents, three churches, and another business the next decade. It had two churches and businesses and 97 families in 1987 and the population remained at 50 in 2000.

== Geography ==
Concord is located 6 mi (9.7 km) north of New Summerfield in extreme northeastern Cherokee County.

== Education ==
Concord School was established in 1884 and joined the Carlisle Independent School District in 1948.
