= National Register of Historic Places listings in Cherokee County, Texas =

Location of Cherokee County in Texas

This is a list of the National Register of Historic Places listings in Cherokee County, Texas.

This is intended to be a complete list of properties listed on the National Register of Historic Places in Cherokee County, Texas. There are five properties listed on the National Register in the county. One property is also a State Historic Site.

This National Park Service list is complete through NPS recent listings posted November 6, 2026.

== Current listings ==
The locations of National Register properties may be seen in a mapping service provided.

	Name on the Register	Image	Date listed	Location	City or town	Description
1	Aber and Haberle Houses	Aber and Haberle Houses	August 21, 1984 (#84001630)	823 and 833 S. Bolton St. 31°57′21″N 95°16′20″W	Jacksonville	
2	George C. Davis Site	George C. Davis Site	October 15, 1970 (#70000742); November 15, 1979 boundary increase (#79003449)	1649 SH 21 W. 31°35′47″N 95°08′55″W	Alto	State Historic Site
3	Jacksonville Post Office	Jacksonville Post Office	January 14, 2004 (#03001417)	402 E. Rusk St. 31°57′49″N 95°16′12″W	Jacksonville	Art Deco building, 1933 to 2000 (Note: This is actually the former and historic post office built in 1932)
4	William Walter Newton House	William Walter Newton House	July 15, 1982 (#82004496)	401 N. Bolton St. 31°58′02″N 95°16′36″W	Jacksonville	
5	James I. and Myrta Blake Perkins House	James I. and Myrta Blake Perkins House	July 25, 2002 (#02000823)	303 E. 5th St. 31°47′41″N 95°08′51″W	Rusk	

== See also ==
- National Register of Historic Places listings in Texas
- Recorded Texas Historic Landmarks in Cherokee County
