= Shadybrook, Texas =

- Census-designated place
- Location within Texas Location within the United States
- Coordinates: 32°07′08″N 95°25′12″W
- Country: United States
- State: Texas
- County: Cherokee

Area
  - Total: 9.3 sq mi (24.0 km^{2})
  - Land: 7.7 sq mi (20.0 km^{2})
  - Water: 1.5 sq mi (4.0 km^{2})
- Elevation: 381 ft (116 m)

Population (2010)
  - Total: 1,967
  - Density: 255/sq mi (98.4/km^{2})
- Time zone: UTC-6 (Central (CST))
  - Summer (DST): UTC-5 (CDT)
- ZIP code: 75757
- Area codes: 430, 903
- FIPS code: 48-67010
- GNIS feature ID: 2586988

Shadybrook is a census-designated place (CDP) in Cherokee County, Texas, United States. As of the 2020 census, Shadybrook had a population of 2,400.

The CDP is located in the northwestern corner of the county adjacent to Lake Palestine, and takes its name from a gated community located on either side of Farm to Market Road 346. It is 16 miles (26 km) northwest of Jacksonville and 21 miles (34 km) southwest of Tyler. The CDP includes the namesake development along with other developments and individually owned houses in the area. A map of the CDP is shown here.

== Geography ==
According to the United States Census Bureau, the CDP has a total area of 9.3 square miles (24.0 km^{2}), of which 7.7 square miles (20.0 km^{2}) is land and 1.5 square miles (4.0 km^{2}), or 16.68%, is water, consisting of part of Lake Palestine.

== Demographics ==
Historical population
Census	Pop.	Note	%±
2010	1,967		—
2020	2,400		22.0%
U.S. Decennial Census; 1850–1900 1910; 1920 1930 1940; 1950 1960 1970; 1980 1990 2000; 2010 2020

Shadybrook first appeared as a census designated place in the 2010 U.S. census.

Shadybrook CDP, Texas – Racial and ethnic composition Note: the US Census treats Hispanic/Latino as an ethnic category. This table excludes Latinos from the racial categories and assigns them to a separate category. Hispanics/Latinos may be of any race.
Race / Ethnicity (NH = Non-Hispanic)	Pop 2010	Pop 2020	% 2010	% 2020
White alone (NH)	1,692	1,965	86.02%	81.88%
Black or African American alone (NH)	106	103	5.39%	4.29%
Native American or Alaska Native alone (NH)	14	14	0.71%	0.58%
Asian alone (NH)	5	13	0.25%	0.54%
Native Hawaiian or Pacific Islander alone (NH)	0	0	0.00%	0.00%
Other race alone (NH)	2	7	0.10%	0.29%
Mixed race or Multiracial (NH)	50	150	2.54%	6.25%
Hispanic or Latino (any race)	98	148	4.98%	6.17%
Total	1,967	2,400	100.00%	100.00%
