= Corine, Texas =

- Unincorporated community
- Location within Texas Location within the United States
- Coordinates: 31°58′46″N 95°23′55″W
- Country: United States
- State: Texas
- County: Cherokee
- Elevation: 443 ft (135 m)
- Time zone: UTC-6 (Central (CST))
  - Summer (DST): UTC-5 (CDT)
- Area codes: 430 & 903
- GNIS feature ID: 2573492

Corine is an unincorporated community in Cherokee County, located in the U.S. state of Texas.
