= Etna, Texas =

Coordinates: 32.1359°N 95.3368°W

Etna is a ghost town that was located near the site of present-day Bullard in northwestern Cherokee County, Texas, United States.

== History ==
Etna was first settled by immigrants from the Old South around the time of the Civil War. A local post office was established in 1867 and by the early 1880s the town possessed a dry good store, a district school, a church, a gristmill, a blacksmith, and several general stores. The settlement began to decline by the mid-1880s after the Kansas and Gulf Short Line Railroad bypassed Etna. Most of the residents and businesses move to Bullard and the post office closed in 1883. By 1900, Etna was a ghost town.
