= Cherokee County, Texas =

County in Texas, United States

- County
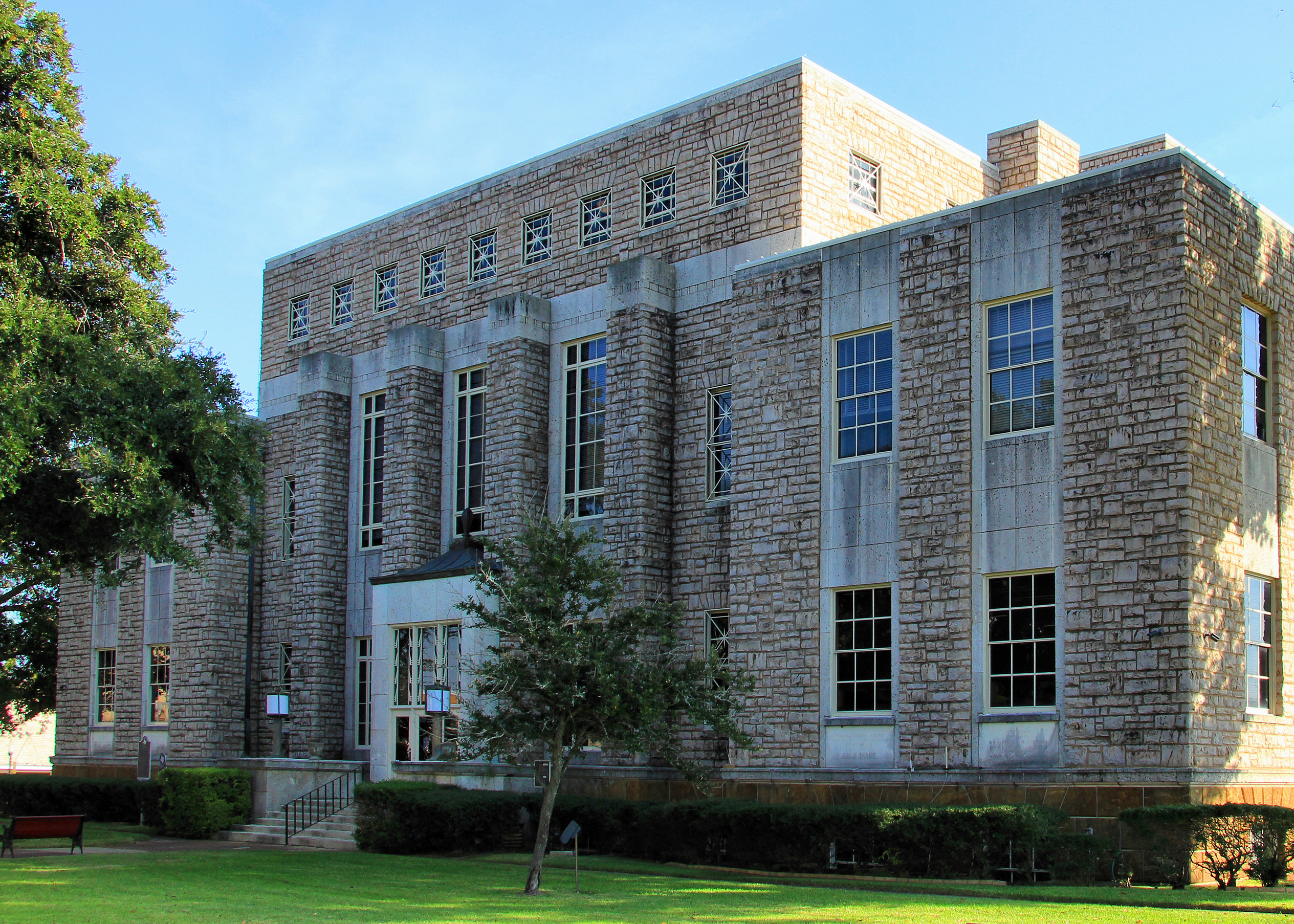
- The Cherokee County Courthouse in Rusk

- Location within the U.S. state of Texas
- Coordinates: 31°50′N 95°10′W
- Country: United States
- State: Texas
- Founded: July 13, 1846
- Named for: Cherokee people
- Seat: Rusk
- Largest city: Jacksonville

Area
  - Total: 1,062 sq mi (2,750 km^{2})
  - Land: 1,053 sq mi (2,730 km^{2})
  - Water: 9.3 sq mi (24 km^{2}) 0.9%

Population (2020)
  - Total: 50,412
  - Estimate (2025): 53,337 ▲
  - Density: 47.87/sq mi (18.48/km^{2})
- Time zone: UTC−6 (Central)
  - Summer (DST): UTC−5 (CDT)
- Congressional district: 6th
- Website: www.co.cherokee.tx.us

Cherokee County is a county located in the U.S. state of Texas. As of the 2020 census, its population was 50,412. The county seat is Rusk, which lies 130 miles southeast of Dallas and 160 miles north of Houston. The county was named for the Cherokee, who lived in the area before being expelled in 1839. Cherokee County comprises the Jacksonville micropolitan statistical area, which is also included in the Tyler–Jacksonville combined statistical area.

== History ==
=== Native Americans ===
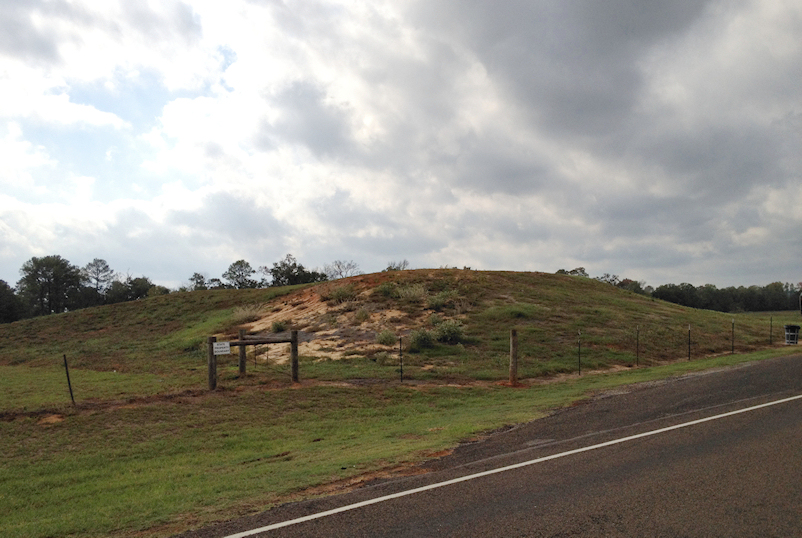
Caddo Mounds at the Caddo Mounds State Historic Site in Cherokee County

The Hasinai group of the Caddo tribe built a village in the area in around AD 800 and continued to live in the area until the 1830s, when they migrated to the Brazos River. The federal government moved them to the Brazos Indian Reservation in 1855 and later to Oklahoma.

The Cherokee, Delaware, Shawnee, and Kickapoo Native American peoples began settling in the area around 1820. The Texas Cherokee tried unsuccessfully to gain a grant to their own land from the Mexican government.

Sam Houston, adopted son of Chief Oolooteka (John Jolly) of the Cherokee, negotiated the January 14, 1836, treaty between Chief Bowl of the Cherokee and the Republic of Texas. On December 16, 1837, the Texas Senate declared the treaty null and void, and encroachment upon Cherokee lands continued. On October 5, 1838, Indians massacred members of the Isaac Killough family at their farm northwest of the site of present Jacksonville, leading to the Cherokee War of 1839 and the expulsion of some to Oklahoma. Some went to Monclova in Mexico, and some to Rusk and Gregg counties (many had relatives among the Choctaw/Chickasaw/Creek community there). Later, in 1844, President Polk issued an executive order known as "The Right to return", allowing many Cherokee to return to Texas. Some came to what is now Cherokee County.

=== Early exploration and settlers ===
Domingo Terán de los Ríos and Father Damián Massanet explored the area on behalf of Spain in 1691. Louis Juchereau de St. Denis began trading with the Hasinais in 1705. Nuestro Padre San Francisco de los Tejas was originally established in 1690, but was re-established in 1716 by Captain Domingo Ramon. It was abandoned again because of French incursions and re-established in 1721 by the Marques de San Miguel de Aguyao.

In 1826, empresario David G. Burnet received a grant from the Coahuila y Tejas legislature to settle 300 families. The settlers were mostly from the Southern states, and brought the lifestyle of that region with them. By contracting how many families each grantee could settle, the government sought to have some control over colonization.

=== County established and growth ===
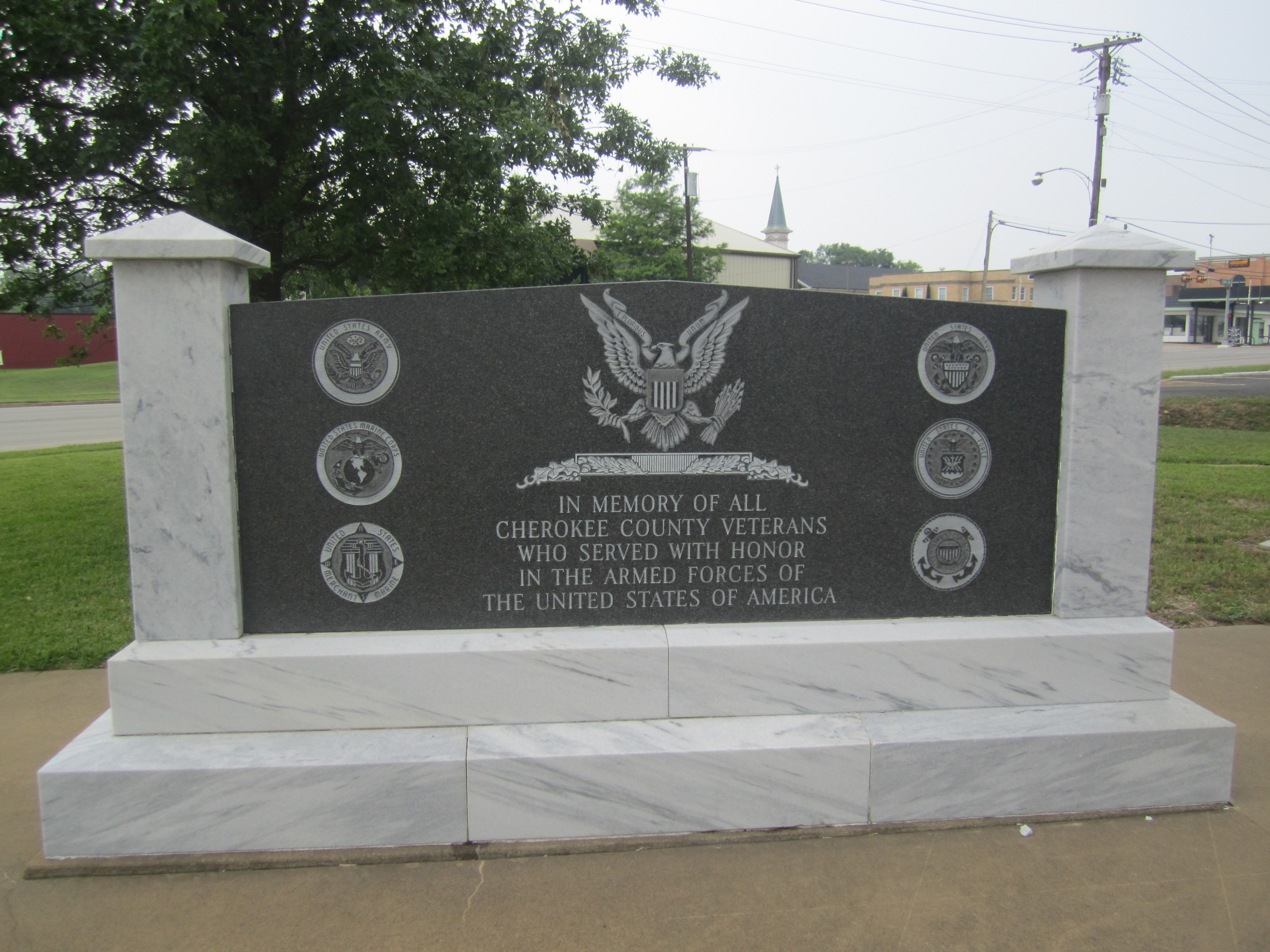
Cherokee Veterans Monument in Jacksonville, Texas

Cherokee County was formed from land given by Nacogdoches County in 1846. It was organized in the same year. The town of Rusk became the county seat. Cherokee County voted in favor of secession from the Union, during the build-up to the American Civil War.

In 1872, the International – Great Northern Railroad caused Jacksonville to relocate two miles east, to be near the tracks. The Kansas and Gulf Short Line Railway was built north-to-south through the county between 1882 and 1885. The Texas and New Orleans Railroad in 1905, and the Texas State Railroad in 1910, each gave rise to new county towns along their tracks.

== Geography ==
According to the U.S. Census Bureau, the county has a total area of 1,062 square miles (2,750 km^{2}), of which 9.3 square miles (24 km^{2}) (0.9%) are covered by water.

=== Major highways ===
- U.S. Highway 69
- U.S. Highway 79
- U.S. Highway 84
- U.S. Highway 175
- State Highway 21
- State Highway 110
- State Highway 135
- State Highway 204
- State Highway 294
- Loop 62
- Loop 142
- Loop 456

=== Adjacent counties ===
- Smith County (north)
- Rusk County (northeast, east)
- Nacogdoches County (east, southeast)
- Angelina County (southeast)
- Houston County (southwest)
- Anderson County (west)
- Henderson County (northwest)

=== National protected area ===
- Neches River National Wildlife Refuge (part)

== Communities ==
=== Cities ===
- Gallatin
- Jacksonville
- New Summerfield
- Reklaw (partly in Rusk County)
- Rusk (county seat)
- Troup (mostly in Smith County)

=== Towns ===
- Alto
- Bullard (mostly in Smith County)
- Cuney
- Wells

=== Census-designated place ===
- Shadybrook

=== Unincorporated communities ===
- Blackjack
- Central High
- Circle
- Concord
- Cove Springs
- Craft
- Dialville
- Elm Grove
- Forest
- Gould
- Henry's Chapel
- Ironton
- Linwood
- Maydelle
- Mixon
- Mount Selman
- New Hope
- Oakland
- Pine Grove
- Ponta
- Reese
- Salem
- Shady Grove
- Sweet Union
- Weeping Mary

=== Ghost towns ===
- Atoy
- Brunswick
- Bulah
- Corine
- Earle's Chapel
- Emmaus
- Etna
- Fry's Gap
- Griffin
- Java
- Larissa
- Lone Star
- Mewshaw
- Morrill
- New Birmingham
- Pierces Chapel
- Prices
- Redlawn
- Rock Hill
- Tecula
- Turney
- Wildhurst

== Demographics ==
Historical population
| Census | Pop. | Note | %± |
|---|---|---|---|
| 1850 | 6,673 | | — |
| 1860 | 12,098 | | 81.3% |
| 1870 | 11,079 | | −8.4% |
| 1880 | 16,723 | | 50.9% |
| 1890 | 22,975 | | 37.4% |
| 1900 | 25,154 | | 9.5% |
| 1910 | 29,038 | | 15.4% |
| 1920 | 37,633 | | 29.6% |
| 1930 | 43,180 | | 14.7% |
| 1940 | 43,970 | | 1.8% |
| 1950 | 38,694 | | −12.0% |
| 1960 | 33,120 | | −14.4% |
| 1970 | 32,008 | | −3.4% |
| 1980 | 38,127 | | 19.1% |
| 1990 | 41,049 | | 7.7% |
| 2000 | 46,659 | | 13.7% |
| 2010 | 50,845 | | 9.0% |
| 2020 | 50,412 | | −0.9% |
| 2025 (est.) | 53,337 | ▲ | 5.8% |
U.S. Decennial Census; 1850–2010 2010 2020

=== Racial and ethnic composition ===
Cherokee County, Texas – Racial and ethnic composition Note: the US Census treats Hispanic/Latino as an ethnic category. This table excludes Latinos from the racial categories and assigns them to a separate category. Hispanics/Latinos may be of any race.
| Race / Ethnicity (NH = Non-Hispanic) | Pop 1980 | Pop 1990 | Pop 2000 | Pop 2010 | Pop 2020 | % 1980 | % 1990 | % 2000 | % 2010 | % 2020 |
|---|---|---|---|---|---|---|---|---|---|---|
| White alone (NH) | 29,583 | 31,201 | 32,347 | 31,892 | 30,095 | 77.59% | 76.01% | 69.33% | 62.72% | 59.70% |
| Black or African American alone (NH) | 6,979 | 6,858 | 7,409 | 7,401 | 6,359 | 18.30% | 16.71% | 15.88% | 14.56% | 12.61% |
| Native American or Alaska Native alone (NH) | 65 | 97 | 143 | 125 | 128 | 0.17% | 0.24% | 0.31% | 0.25% | 0.25% |
| Asian alone (NH) | 131 | 180 | 177 | 221 | 263 | 0.34% | 0.44% | 0.38% | 0.43% | 0.52% |
| Native Hawaiian or Pacific Islander alone (NH) | x | x | 8 | 6 | 18 | x | x | 0.02% | 0.01% | 0.04% |
| Other race alone (NH) | 75 | 16 | 17 | 36 | 123 | 0.20% | 0.04% | 0.04% | 0.07% | 0.24% |
| Mixed race or Multiracial (NH) | x | x | 380 | 665 | 1,629 | x | x | 0.81% | 1.31% | 3.23% |
| Hispanic or Latino (any race) | 1,294 | 2,697 | 6,178 | 10,499 | 11,797 | 3.39% | 6.57% | 13.24% | 20.65% | 23.40% |
| Total | 38,127 | 41,049 | 46,659 | 50,845 | 50,412 | 100.00% | 100.00% | 100.00% | 100.00% | 100.00% |

=== 2020 census ===
As of the 2020 census, the county had a population of 50,412. The median age was 39.5 years; 24.8% of the residents were under 18 and 18.4% were 65 or older. For every 100 females, there were 102.8 males, and for every 100 females 18 and over, there were 101.4 males age 18 and over.

The racial makeup of the county was 63.7% White, 12.7% Black or African American, 0.9% American Indian and Alaska Native, 0.5% Asian, <0.1% Native Hawaiian and Pacific Islander, 12.3% from some other race, and 9.7% from two or more races. Hispanic or Latino residents of any race comprised 23.4% of the population.

About 27.5% of residents lived in urban areas, while 72.5% lived in rural areas.

Of the 17,992 households in the county, 34.4% had children under 18 living in them, 51.2% were married-couple households, 16.6% were households with a male householder and no spouse or partner present, and 27.0% were households with a female householder and no spouse or partner present. About 24.7% of all households were made up of individuals, and 11.6% had someone living alone who was 65 years of age or older.

The county had 20,838 housing units, of which 13.7% were vacant. Among occupied housing units, 72.7% were owner-occupied and 27.3% were renter-occupied. The homeowner vacancy rate was 1.7% and the rental vacancy rate was 9.4%.

The increase among its Hispanic and Asian American populations represented the nationwide demographic shift since the 2020 census.

=== 2020 American Community Survey ===
According to the 2020 American Community Survey, there were 18,540 households with an average household size of 2.65 and average family size of 3.07.

The 2020 American Community Survey's estimates determined there was a median household income of $50,199 with a per capita income of $66,658.

=== 2000 census ===
At the 2000 census, 46,659 people, 16,651 households, and 12,105 families were residing in the county. The population density was 44 people per square mile (17 people/km^{2}). The 19,173 housing units averaged 18 units per square mile (6.9/km^{2}). The racial and ethnic makeup of the county was 74.34% White, 15.96% Black or African American, 0.47% Native American, 0.40% Asian, 0.06% Pacific Islander, 7.43% from other races, and 1.34% from two or more races. About 13.24% of the population was Hispanic or Latino of any race.

Of the 16,651 households in 2000, 33.4% had children under 18 living with them, 55.7% were married couples living together, 12.8% had a female householder with no husband present, and 27.3% were not families. Around 24.2% of all households were made up of individuals, and 11.9% had someone living alone who was 65 or older. The average household size was 2.63, and the average family size was 3.11.

At the 2000 census, the median income in the county for a household was $29,313 and for a family was $34,750. Males had a median income of $26,410 versus $19,788 for females. The per capita income for the county was $13,980. About 13.7% of families and 17.9% of the population were below the poverty line, including 23.3% of those under 18 and 15.1% of those 65 or over.

== Media ==
Cherokee County is part of the Tyler/Longview/Jacksonville DMA. Local media outlets are: KLTV, KTRE-TV, KYTX-TV, KFXK-TV, KCEB-TV, and KETK-TV.

Newspapers in the county include the Jacksonville Progress, which publishes three editions a week in Jacksonville, and the weekly Cherokeean Herald in Rusk.

== Education ==
School districts within Cherokee County Texas include:

- Alto Independent School District
- Bullard Independent School District
- Carlisle Independent School District
- Jacksonville Independent School District
- New Summerfield Independent School District
- Rusk Independent School District
- Troup Independent School District
- Wells Independent School District

Areas in Bullard, Jacksonville, New Summerfield, Rusk, and Troup are assigned to Tyler Junior College. Areas of Cherokee County in Alto ISD and Wells ISD are assigned to Angelina College. Areas in Carlisle ISD are assigned to Kilgore College. Legislation does not specify a community college for the remainder of the county.

== Politics ==
United States presidential election results for Cherokee County, Texas
| Year | Republican | | Democratic | | Third party(ies) | |
| Year | No. | % | No. | % | No. | % |
|---|---|---|---|---|---|---|
| 1912 | 145 | 7.67% | 1,684 | 89.10% | 61 | 3.23% |
| 1916 | 241 | 9.67% | 2,002 | 80.34% | 249 | 9.99% |
| 1920 | 478 | 13.38% | 2,233 | 62.51% | 861 | 24.10% |
| 1924 | 666 | 13.06% | 4,343 | 85.17% | 90 | 1.77% |
| 1928 | 1,933 | 49.94% | 1,938 | 50.06% | 0 | 0.00% |
| 1932 | 233 | 5.33% | 4,125 | 94.44% | 10 | 0.23% |
| 1936 | 302 | 7.16% | 3,908 | 92.65% | 8 | 0.19% |
| 1940 | 801 | 13.12% | 5,293 | 86.71% | 10 | 0.16% |
| 1944 | 598 | 11.62% | 3,918 | 76.14% | 630 | 12.24% |
| 1948 | 1,154 | 24.01% | 3,079 | 64.07% | 573 | 11.92% |
| 1952 | 3,825 | 49.63% | 3,868 | 50.19% | 14 | 0.18% |
| 1956 | 4,022 | 57.78% | 2,912 | 41.83% | 27 | 0.39% |
| 1960 | 3,233 | 41.02% | 4,544 | 57.65% | 105 | 1.33% |
| 1964 | 3,043 | 35.64% | 5,485 | 64.25% | 9 | 0.11% |
| 1968 | 2,575 | 26.80% | 3,242 | 33.74% | 3,791 | 39.46% |
| 1972 | 5,743 | 69.29% | 2,467 | 29.77% | 78 | 0.94% |
| 1976 | 3,921 | 37.47% | 6,509 | 62.20% | 35 | 0.33% |
| 1980 | 5,629 | 49.01% | 5,726 | 49.85% | 131 | 1.14% |
| 1984 | 8,187 | 64.41% | 4,494 | 35.36% | 30 | 0.24% |
| 1988 | 7,520 | 57.12% | 5,604 | 42.57% | 41 | 0.31% |
| 1992 | 5,847 | 41.36% | 5,003 | 35.39% | 3,288 | 23.26% |
| 1996 | 6,483 | 51.07% | 5,185 | 40.85% | 1,026 | 8.08% |
| 2000 | 9,599 | 66.03% | 4,755 | 32.71% | 183 | 1.26% |
| 2004 | 11,329 | 71.53% | 4,439 | 28.03% | 71 | 0.45% |
| 2008 | 11,695 | 71.24% | 4,610 | 28.08% | 112 | 0.68% |
| 2012 | 12,094 | 75.00% | 3,875 | 24.03% | 157 | 0.97% |
| 2016 | 12,919 | 76.94% | 3,469 | 20.66% | 402 | 2.39% |
| 2020 | 15,101 | 77.41% | 4,210 | 21.58% | 197 | 1.01% |
| 2024 | 16,593 | 80.91% | 3,744 | 18.26% | 170 | 0.83% |

United States Senate election results for Cherokee County, Texas1
| Year | Republican | | Democratic | | Third party(ies) | |
| Year | No. | % | No. | % | No. | % |
|---|---|---|---|---|---|---|
| 2024 | 16,065 | 78.78% | 3,915 | 19.20% | 413 | 2.03% |

United States Senate election results for Cherokee County, Texas2
| Year | Republican | | Democratic | | Third party(ies) | |
| Year | No. | % | No. | % | No. | % |
|---|---|---|---|---|---|---|
| 2020 | 14,945 | 77.31% | 4,058 | 20.99% | 328 | 1.70% |

Texas Gubernatorial election results for Cherokee County
| Year | Republican | | Democratic | | Third party(ies) | |
| Year | No. | % | No. | % | No. | % |
|---|---|---|---|---|---|---|
| 2022 | 12,023 | 83.01% | 2,323 | 16.04% | 137 | 0.95% |

== See also ==
- National Register of Historic Places listings in Cherokee County, Texas
- Recorded Texas Historic Landmarks in Cherokee County
- Travis Clardy, Texas state representative from Cherokee County
