= Cherokee County Electric Cooperative =

Cherokee County Electric Cooperative Association is a non-profit rural electric utility cooperative headquartered in Rusk, Texas.

The Cooperative was organized in 1939.

The Cooperative serves portions of four counties in the state of Texas, in a territory generally surrounding Rusk.

Currently (as of July 2017) the Cooperative has over 3,300 miles of line and over 20,000 meters.
