= Fry's Gap, Texas =

- Ghost town
- Location within Texas Location within the United States
- Coordinates: 31°59′15″N 95°20′32″W
- Country: United States
- State: Texas
- County: Cherokee
- Elevation: 558 ft (170 m)
- Time zone: UTC-6 (Central (CST))
  - Summer (DST): UTC-5 (CDT)
- Area codes: 430 & 903
- GNIS feature ID: 1357795

Fry's Gap is a ghost town in Cherokee County, located in the U.S. state of Texas.
