= Lone Star, Cherokee County, Texas =

Ghost town in Cherokee County, Texas, United States

Lone Star, Texas
- Ghost town
- Location within Texas Location within the United States
- Coordinates: 31°57′13″N 95°02′17″W
- Country: United States
- State: Texas
- County: Cherokee
- Elevation: 509 ft (155 m)
- Time zone: UTC-6 (Central (CST))
  - Summer (DST): UTC-5 (CDT)
- Area codes: 430 & 903
- GNIS feature ID: 1378602

Lone Star is a ghost town in Cherokee County, Texas, United States.

== See also ==
- List of ghost towns in Texas
