= Cuney, Texas =

- Town
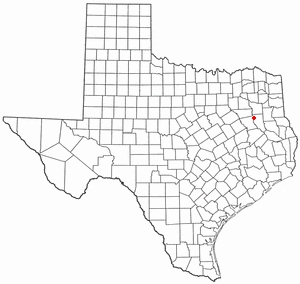
- Location of Cuney, Texas

- Coordinates: 32°02′15″N 95°24′53″W
- Country: United States
- State: Texas
- County: Cherokee

Government
  - City Council: Mayor

Area
  - Total: 1.64 sq mi (4.26 km^{2})
  - Land: 1.64 sq mi (4.26 km^{2})
  - Water: 0 sq mi (0.00 km^{2})
- Elevation: 443 ft (135 m)

Population (2020)
  - Total: 116
  - Density: 70.5/sq mi (27.2/km^{2})
- Time zone: UTC-6 (Central (CST))
  - Summer (DST): UTC-5 (CDT)
- ZIP code: 75759
- Area codes: 430, 903
- FIPS code: 48-18152
- GNIS feature ID: 2412396

Cuney is a town located in northwestern Cherokee County, Texas, United States. With a population of 116 at the 2020 U.S. census, Cuney was the only "wet" town in Cherokee County from the mid-1980s until 2009, when voters in Rusk came out in favor of beer/wine sales. After that result, voters in Jacksonville and Frankston have since voted in favor of beer/wine sales, and Rusk voters returned to the polls to vote in favor of liquor sales.

== History ==
The site was first settled by freed slaves just after the Civil War. The settlement was initially known as Andy, after Andrew "Andy" Bragg, one of the area's first black homeowners, who arrived in 1870. A community did not develop until 1902, when the site became a flag stop on the Texas and New Orleans Railroad, which became part of the Southern Pacific system in 1961.

Around 1914, Palestine cashier H.L. Price and several local investors formed a company and platted a town site. They named the town Cuney, after Price's son, Cuney Price, who in turn had been named for Norris Wright Cuney, a prominent black politician and head of the state's Republican Party. A post office was established in 1917 and a number of businesses were operating in the community by the early 1920s. With the paving of State Highway 40 in 1929, which would eventually become U.S. Highway 175, most of the businesses moved a mile north of the railroad to take advantage of the increased traffic. The population was estimated at 100 in 1929, but declined to only 25 by the mid-1930s.

A number of businesses closed after World War II as agricultural prices decreased and residents moved to other cities with greater employment opportunities. Cuney had a population of 75 in the early 1950s. From that period, the community steadily grew, and Cuney was incorporated in November 1983. In the 1990 census, the town had 170 residents. That number had fallen to 145 by 2000.

== Geography ==
Cuney is located just west of the junction of U.S. Highway 175 and FM 855 in northwestern Cherokee County, approximately 10 miles (16 km) northwest of Jacksonville, 24 miles (39 km) northwest of Rusk, and 28 miles (45 km) southeast of Athens.

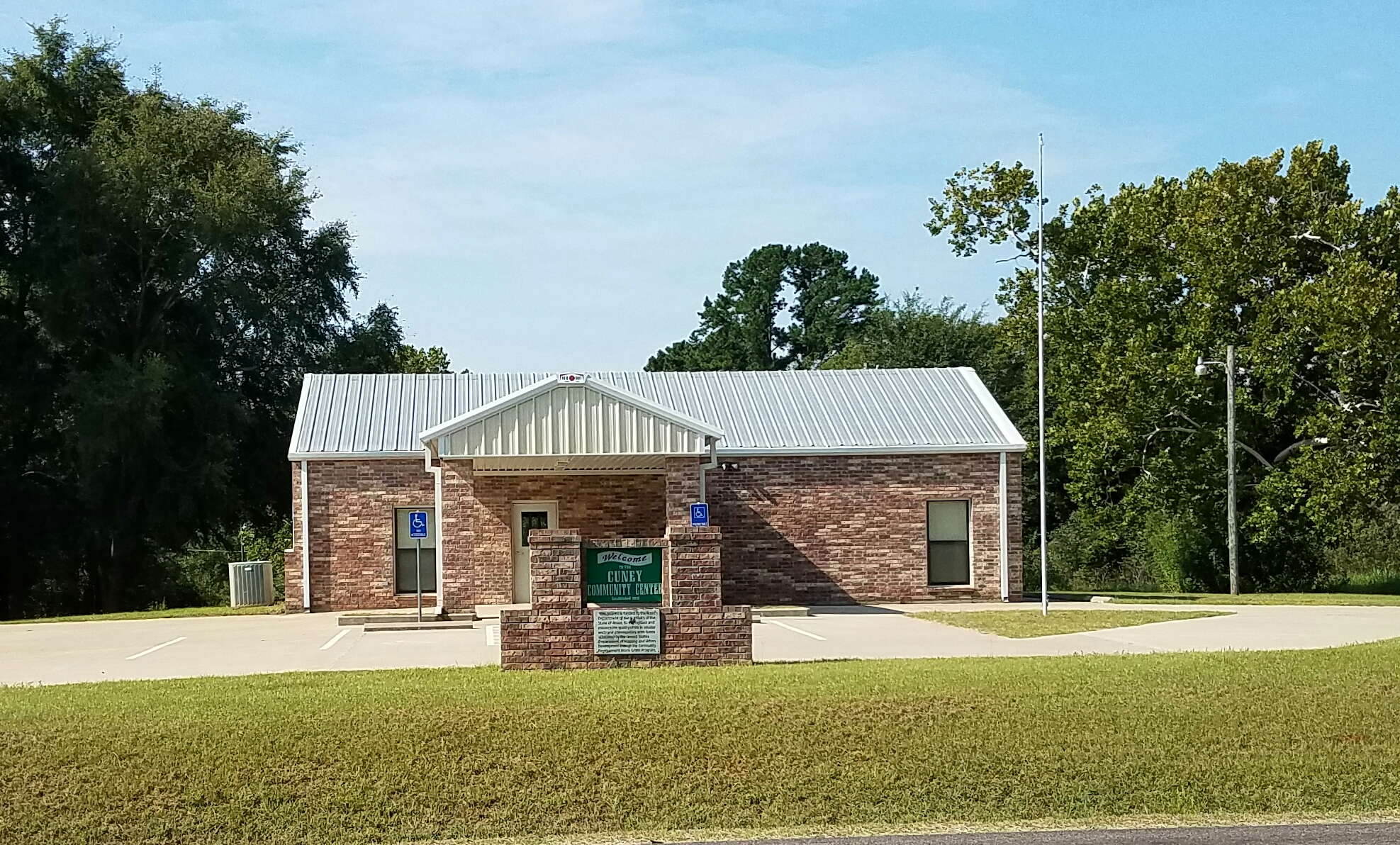
Site of Cuney's Community Center, which was dedicated in 2012. The center is located where Cuney's school once stood.

According to the United States Census Bureau, the town has a total area of 1.64 square miles (4.26 km^{2}), all land. The Neches River forms the northwest border of the town and the Cherokee/Anderson County line.

== Demographics ==
Historical population
Census	Pop.	Note	%±
1990	170		—
2000	145		−14.7%
2010	140		−3.4%
2020	116		−17.1%
U.S. Decennial Census

=== Racial and ethnic composition ===
Cuney town, Texas – Racial and ethnic composition Note: the US Census treats Hispanic/Latino as an ethnic category. This table excludes Latinos from the racial categories and assigns them to a separate category. Hispanics/Latinos may be of any race.
Race / Ethnicity (NH = Non-Hispanic)	Pop 2000	Pop 2010	Pop 2020	% 2000	% 2010	% 2020
White alone (NH)	16	16	20	11.03%	11.43%	17.24%
Black or African American alone (NH)	121	99	69	83.45%	70.71%	59.48%
Native American or Alaska Native alone (NH)	1	0	0	0.69%	0.00%	0.00%
Asian alone (NH)	1	0	0	0.69%	0.00%	0.00%
Native Hawaiian or Pacific Islander alone (NH)	0	0	0	0.00%	0.00%	0.00%
Other race alone (NH)	0	0	1	0.00%	0.00%	0.86%
Mixed race or Multiracial (NH)	5	8	5	3.45%	5.71%	4.31%
Hispanic or Latino (any race)	1	17	21	0.69%	12.14%	18.10%
Total	145	140	116	100.00%	100.00%	100.00%

=== 2020 census ===
As of the 2020 United States census, there were 116 people, 37 households, and 31 families residing in the town.

At the 2000 U.S. census, 145 people, 59 households, and 36 families resided in the town. The population density was 88.6 inhabitants per square mile (34.2/km^{2}). The 78 housing units averaged 47.7 per square mile (18.4/km^{2}). The racial makeup of the town at the 2000 census was 11.03% White, 83.45% African American, 0.69% Native American, 0.69% Asian, 0.69% from other races, and 3.45% from two or more races. Hispanics or Latinos of any race were 0.69% of the population.

Of the 59 households in 2000, 27.1% had children under the age of 18 living with them, 28.8% were married couples living together, 23.7% had a female householder with no husband present, and 37.3% were not families. About 27.1% of all households were made up of individuals, and 11.9% had someone living alone who was 65 years of age or older. The average household size was 2.46 and the average family size was 3.11.

In the town, the population was distributed as 32.4% under the age of 18, 2.1% from 18 to 24, 26.2% from 25 to 44, 24.8% from 45 to 64, and 14.5% who were 65 years of age or older. The median age was 38 years. For every 100 females, there were 98.6 males. For every 100 females age 18 and over, there were 88.5 males.

At the 2000 census, the median income for a household in the town was $18,333, and for a family was $17,500. Males had a median income of $18,438 versus $22,083 for females. The per capita income for the town was $7,612. There were 35.0% of families and 37.1% of the population living below the poverty line, including 43.4% of those under 18 and 44.8% of those over 64. The 2020 American Community Survey reported a median household income of $22,404.

== Education ==
For many years, Cuney had its own school, but is now served by the Jacksonville Independent School District.
