= Earle's Chapel, Texas =

- Unincorporated community
- Location within Texas Location within the United States
- Coordinates: 31°56′25″N 95°20′31″W
- Country: United States
- State: Texas
- County: Cherokee
- Elevation: 515 ft (157 m)
- Time zone: UTC-6 (Central (CST))
  - Summer (DST): UTC-5 (CDT)
- Area codes: 430, 903
- GNIS feature ID: 1373519

Earle's Chapel is an unincorporated community in Cherokee County, located in the U.S. state of Texas. It is located west-southwest of Jacksonville, off U.S. Highway 79.

== Government ==
Earle's Chapel and the surrounding area are served by Station #1 of its own Volunteer Fire Department.

== Education ==
The Earle's Chapel area is served by the Jacksonville Independent School District.
