= Carlisle Independent School District =

School district in Texas

Location
- Texas; United States

Carlisle Independent School District is a public school district based in the community of Price, Texas (USA).

The district is located in west central Rusk County and extends into a small portion of Cherokee County.

Carlisle ISD has one school that serves students in grades Pre-K though twelve.

In 2009, the school district was rated "academically acceptable" by the Texas Education Agency.
