= Gallatin, Texas =

- City
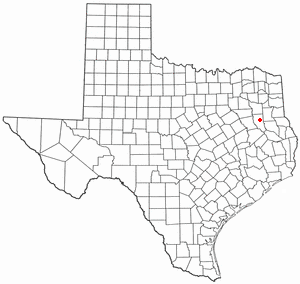
- Location of Gallatin, Texas

- Coordinates: 31°53′49″N 95°09′07″W
- Country: United States
- State: Texas
- County: Cherokee
- Established: 1902

Government
  - Type: Mayor-Council

Area
  - Total: 4.60 sq mi (11.92 km^{2})
  - Land: 4.60 sq mi (11.92 km^{2})
  - Water: 0 sq mi (0.00 km^{2})
- Elevation: 348 ft (106 m)

Population (2020)
  - Total: 321
  - Density: 94/sq mi (36.4/km^{2})
- Time zone: UTC-6 (Central (CST))
  - Summer (DST): UTC-5 (CDT)
- ZIP code: 75764
- Area code: 903 430
- FIPS code: 48-28008
- GNIS feature ID: 2410561

Gallatin is a city in Cherokee County, Texas, United States, with a 2020 U.S. census-tabulated population of 321.

== History ==
The area was first settled in the late 1840s, but a community did not develop until 1902, when the Texas and New Orleans Railroad (T&NO) was built through the area. John W. Chandler and his sister, Sophronia, who owned the surrounding land, asked Rusk attorney C. H. Martin to survey a townsite. Chandler named the new town Gallatin, after his hometown of Gallatin, Tennessee(which in turn had been named for Albert Gallatin). The new community, located in a large truck-farming area, quickly developed into a market for tomatoes and other produce. The construction in 1907 of a branch line of the T&NO between Gallatin and Rusk further enhanced the town as a shipping center.

By 1914, Gallatin had a population of 350, several churches, two general stores, a drugstore, a school, and a cotton gin. In 1916, virtually the entire business district was destroyed by fire, but the town was quickly rebuilt, and as late as the mid-1930s, it reported 500 residents and five businesses.

After World War II, the community steadily declined. Its school was consolidated with the Rusk schools in the 1950s, and many of the town's businesses closed. The population declined to 350 by the early 1950s, and in 1990, only 171 residents and two stores were reported there. Nevertheless, Gallatin was incorporated in the early 1980s. In 1991, it had an estimated population of 382 and three businesses. In 2000, its population was 378 with four businesses.

== Geography ==
According to the United States Census Bureau, the city has a total area of 4.6 square miles (12 km^{2}), all land.

== Demographics ==
Historical population
| Census | Pop. | Note | %± |
|---|---|---|---|
| 1980 | 230 | | — |
| 1990 | 368 | | 60.0% |
| 2000 | 378 | | 2.7% |
| 2010 | 419 | | 10.8% |
| 2020 | 321 | | −23.4% |
U.S. Decennial Census

The racial and ethnic makeup of the city was predominantly non-Hispanic White, and the median household income was $65,673 with a mean income of $68,133.

=== 2020 census ===
As of the 2020 census, Gallatin had a population of 321, down from the town's first record high of 419 in 2010. The median age was 42.1 years, with 23.1% of residents under 18 and 24.0% 65 or older.

For every 100 females, there were 95.7 males, and for every 100 females 18 and over, there were 97.6 males 18 and over. None of the residents lived in urban areas, while 100.0% lived in rural areas.

Of the 131 households in Gallatin, 34.4% had children under 18 living in them, 55.7% were married-couple households, 19.1% were households with a male householder and no spouse or partner present, and 21.4% were households with a female householder and no spouse or partner present. About 18.3% of all households were made up of individuals, and 6.1% had someone living alone who was 65 or older.

The city had 141 housing units, of which 7.1% were vacant. The homeowner vacancy rate was 0.0% and the rental vacancy rate was 10.0%.

Racial composition as of the 2020 census
| Race | Number | Percentage |
|---|---|---|
| White | 236 | 73.5% |
| Black or African American | 8 | 2.5% |
| American Indian and Alaska Native | 3 | 0.9% |
| Some other race | 40 | 12.5% |
| Two or more races | 34 | 10.6% |
| Hispanic or Latino (of any race) | 70 | 21.8% |

=== 2010 census ===
At the 2010 United States census, the population was 419.

== Education ==
Most of the city of Gallatin is served by the Rusk Independent School District. A small portion of the city is within the Jacksonville ISD.

== Notable people ==
- Johnny Horton, singer-songwriter, graduated from the high school at Gallatin before going on to Lon Morris College in Jacksonville, Texas.
