= Reklaw, Texas =

City in Cherokee and Rusk counties in Texas, United States

- City
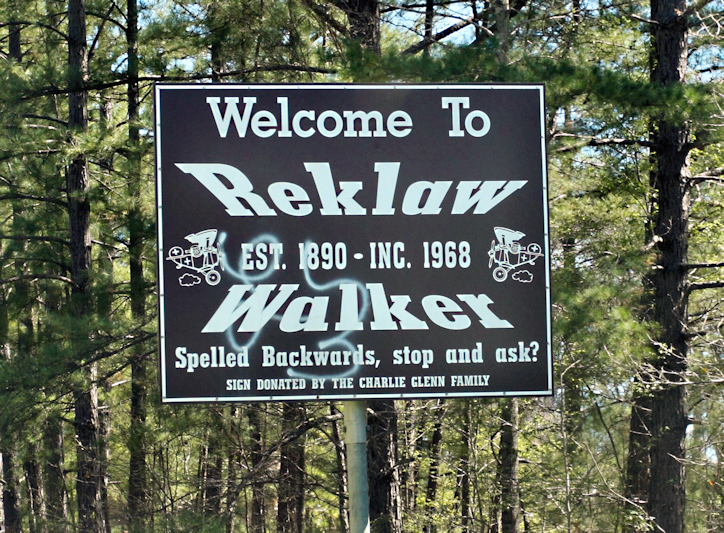
- Reklaw, Texas Townsite Sign

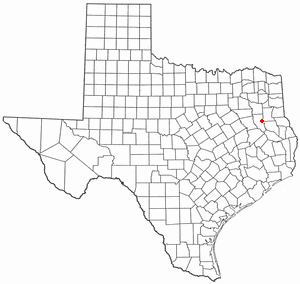
- Location of Reklaw, Texas

- Coordinates: 31°51′45″N 94°59′14″W
- Country: United States
- State: Texas
- Counties: Cherokee, Rusk
- Established: 1890

Area
  - Total: 2.95 sq mi (7.63 km^{2})
  - Land: 2.94 sq mi (7.62 km^{2})
  - Water: 0.0039 sq mi (0.01 km^{2})
- Elevation: 312 ft (95 m)

Population (2020)
  - Total: 332
  - Density: 113/sq mi (43.6/km^{2})
- Time zone: UTC-6 (Central (CST))
  - Summer (DST): UTC-5 (CDT)
- ZIP code: 75784
- Area code: 903
- FIPS code: 48-61508
- GNIS feature ID: 2410922

Reklaw is a city in Cherokee and Rusk counties in Texas, United States. The population was 332 at the 2020 census.

== History ==
The town is named for Margaret Walker, who donated the land for the townsite, but since a Walker, Texas already existed elsewhere, the town simply spelled her name backward. Similarly, the nearby town of Sacul was also named with a spelling reversal.

== Geography ==
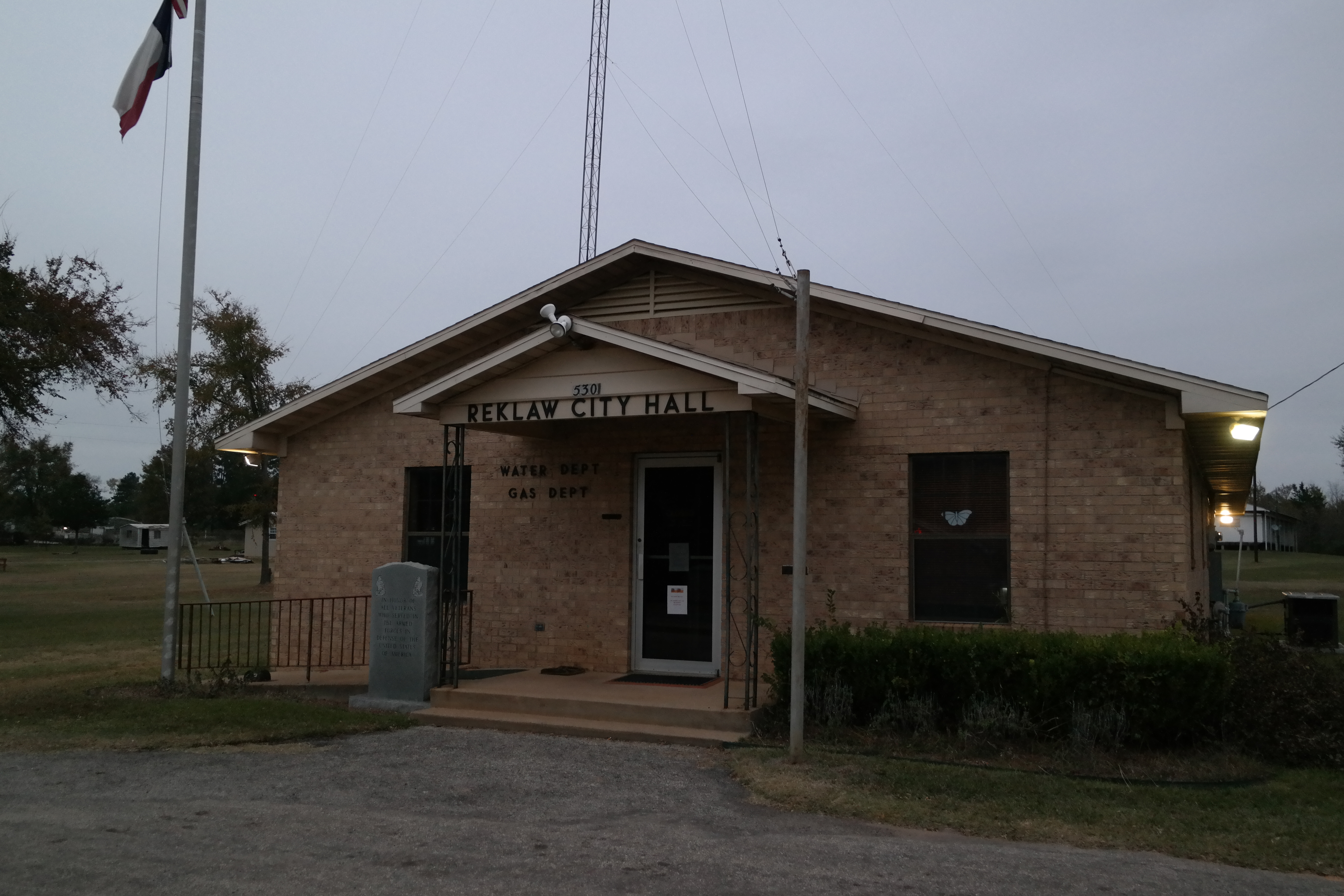
City hall

According to the United States Census Bureau, the city has a total area of 2.9 square miles (7.6 km^{2}), all land. Most of the city lies in Cherokee County, with only a small portion extending into Rusk County.

=== Climate ===
The climate in this area is characterized by hot, humid summers and generally mild to cool winters. According to the Köppen Climate Classification system, Reklaw has a humid subtropical climate, abbreviated "Cfa" on climate maps.

== Demographics ==
Historical population
Census	Pop.	Note	%±
1970	171		—
1980	305		78.4%
1990	266		−12.8%
2000	327		22.9%
2010	379		15.9%
2020	332		−12.4%
U.S. Decennial Census; 2020 Census

=== 2020 census ===
As of the 2020 census, Reklaw had a population of 332. The median age was 39.6 years. 29.2% of residents were under the age of 18 and 15.7% of residents were 65 years of age or older. For every 100 females there were 89.7 males, and for every 100 females age 18 and over there were 80.8 males age 18 and over.

0.0% of residents lived in urban areas, while 100.0% lived in rural areas.

There were 125 households in Reklaw, of which 37.6% had children under the age of 18 living in them. Of all households, 54.4% were married-couple households, 13.6% were households with a male householder and no spouse or partner present, and 24.8% were households with a female householder and no spouse or partner present. About 16.8% of all households were made up of individuals and 9.6% had someone living alone who was 65 years of age or older.

There were 148 housing units, of which 15.5% were vacant. The homeowner vacancy rate was 0.0% and the rental vacancy rate was 9.4%.

Racial composition as of the 2020 census
Race	Number	Percent
White	237	71.4%
Black or African American	29	8.7%
American Indian and Alaska Native	1	0.3%
Asian	1	0.3%
Native Hawaiian and Other Pacific Islander	0	0.0%
Some other race	44	13.3%
Two or more races	20	6.0%
Hispanic or Latino (of any race)	68	20.5%

=== 2000 census ===
As of the 2000 census, there were 327 people, 130 households, and 88 families residing in the city. The population density was 111 inhabitants per square mile (43/km^{2}). There were 150 housing units at an average density of 51.1 units per square mile (19.7 units/km^{2}). The racial makeup of the city was 85.02% White, 7.65% African American, 0.31% Native American, 5.20% from other races, and 1.83% from two or more races. Hispanic or Latino of any race were 13.46% of the population.

There were 130 households, out of which 24.6% had children under the age of 18 living with them, 59.2% were married couples living together, 6.2% had a female householder with no husband present, and 32.3% were non-families. 28.5% of all households were made up of individuals, and 19.2% had someone living alone who was 65 years of age or older. The average household size was 2.52 and the average family size was 3.18.

In the city, the population was spread out, with 20.8% under the age of 18, 8.9% from 18 to 24, 24.2% from 25 to 44, 25.1% from 45 to 64, and 21.1% who were 65 years of age or older. The median age was 41 years. For every 100 females, there were 94.6 males. For every 100 females age 18 and over, there were 97.7 males.

The median income for a household in the city was $29,167, and the median income for a family was $38,250. Males had a median income of $27,083 versus $18,750 for females. The per capita income for the city was $16,092. About 6.5% of families and 16.1% of the population were below the poverty line, including 25.0% of those under age 18 and 17.5% of those age 65 or over.

== Education ==
The City of Reklaw is served by the Rusk Independent School District.

== Postal service ==
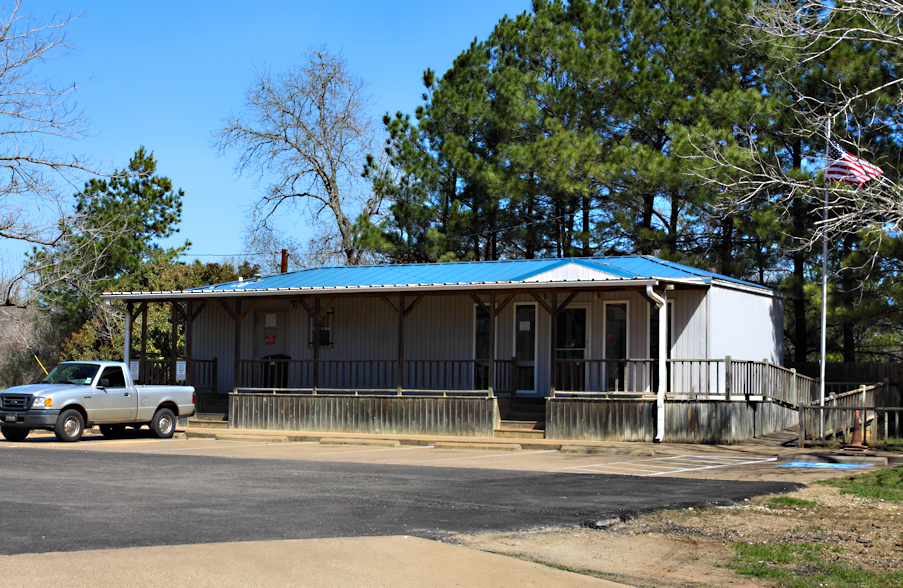
Reklaw, Texas Post Office

The United States Postal Service operates a post office in Reklaw to serve the residents of the city and the outlying areas.

== See also ==
- List of municipalities in Texas
- List of geographic names derived from anagrams and ananyms
