= Rusk Independent School District =

School district in Texas

Rusk Independent School District is a public school district based in Rusk, Texas, United States.

The district serves the cities of Rusk, Gallatin, and Reklaw, rural areas in central Cherokee County (including Maydelle), and a small portion of southwestern Rusk County.

In 2009, the school district was rated "academically acceptable" by the Texas Education Agency.

On July 1, 1985, portions of the McAdoo Independent School District were incorporated into Rusk ISD. On July 1, 1989, the Maydelle Independent School District also merged into Rusk ISD.

== Schools ==
- Rusk High School (grades 9–12)
- Rusk Junior High School (grades 6–8)
- Rusk Intermediate School (grades 4–5)
- Rusk Elementary School (grades 2–3)
- G.W. Bradford Primary School (prekindergarten-grade 1)
