= Jacksonville Independent School District =

School district in Texas

Location
- 800 College Avenue; Jacksonville, Texas ESC Region 7 USA

District information
- Type: Public
- Grades: Pre-K through 12
- Superintendent: Brad Stewart

Students and staff
- Athletic conference: UIL District 17 Class 5A
- Colors: Blue and gold

Other information
- Mascot: Fightin' Indians/Maidens
- Website: Jacksonville ISD

Jacksonville Independent School District is a public school district based in Jacksonville, Texas, United States. Brad Stewart is currently the superintendent of JISD.

In addition to Jacksonville, the district serves the towns of Cuney and Gallatin, and rural areas in northwestern Cherokee County.

In 2009, the school district was rated "academically acceptable" by the Texas Education Agency.

== Info ==
Mascot: Indians (HS), Braves (MS)

Colors: Blue and Gold

=== School Song ===
High School	Middle School
"Tho' years may come and many days may pass away. The memories of ole J'ville High Will always stay. That spirit, so loyal Did honor to your name. That gold and blue royal, those colors always mean the same. The friendships dear that we made here will still remain. The Indians, too, they're always true to you! (You, you, you, you) Tho' years may come and years may go Remember this... We're always true to you, Old J.H.S.!"	"All Hail to J'ville's Honor Best in the land. We are United, And for victory stand. We sail the sea of Triumph, o'er this great land. We're ever fighting, For our Dear JMS Braves!"

== Schools ==
=== High School (Grades 9-12) ===
- Jacksonville High School

=== Middle School (Grades 7-8) ===
- Jacksonville Middle School

=== Intermediate School (Grades 5-6) ===
- Nichols Intermediate School

=== Elementary Schools (Grades PK-4) ===
- East Side Elementary School
- Fred Douglass Elementary School
- West Side Elementary School
- Joe Wright Elementary School

=== Alternative School (Grades PK-12) ===
- Compass Center

== See also ==
- List of school districts in Texas
- List of high schools in Texas
