= Tyler–Jacksonville combined statistical area =

Tyler–Jacksonville, TX Tyler–Jacksonville, TX Combined Statistical Area
- Combined Statistical Area
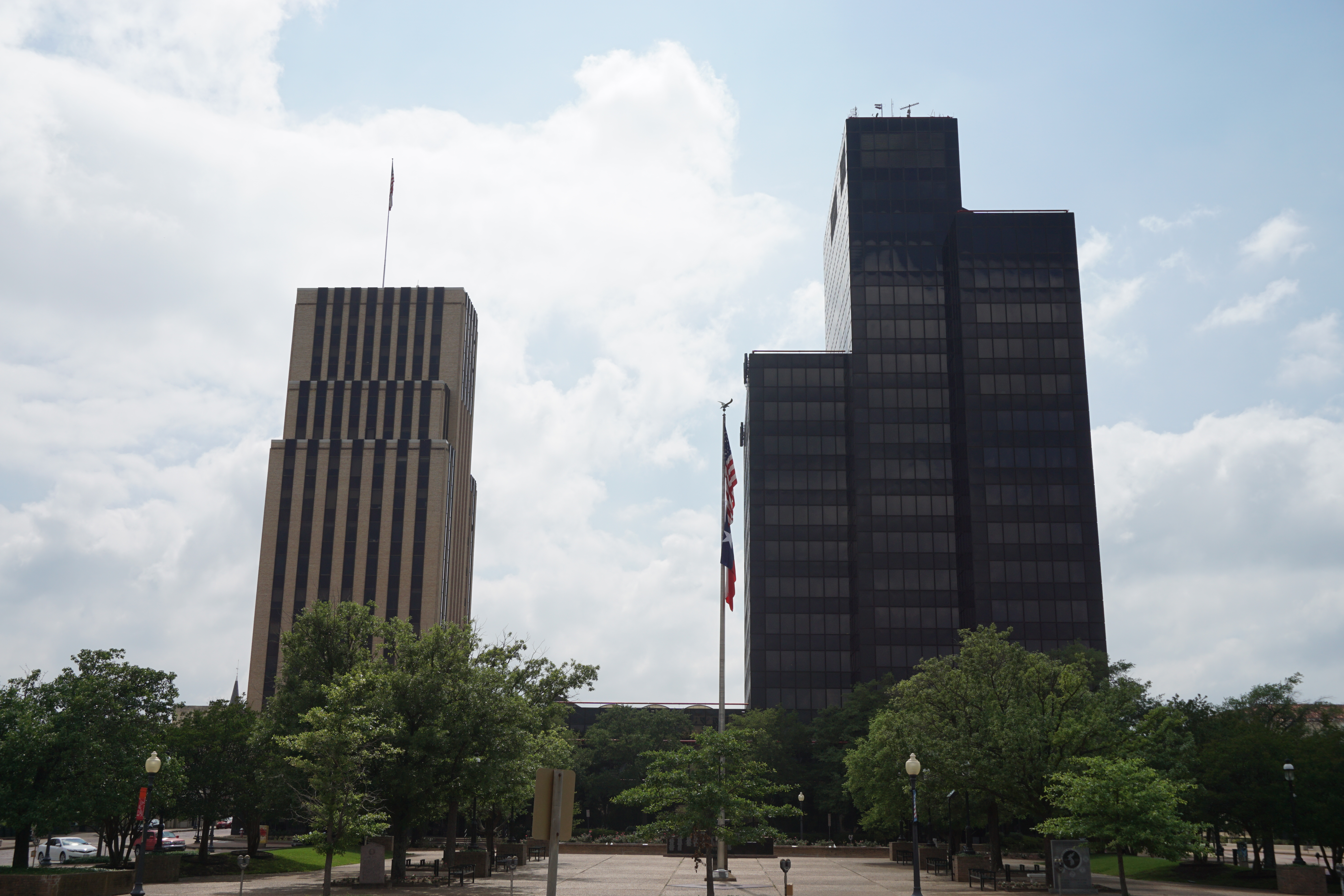
- People's Petroleum Building and Plaza Tower in Downtown Tyler
Interactive Map of Tyler–Jacksonville, TX CSA
City of Tyler
Tyler, TX MSA
City of Jacksonville
Jacksonville, TX µSA
- Country: United States
- State: Texas
- Principal cities: Tyler; Jacksonville
- Time zone: UTC−6 (CST)
  - Summer (DST): UTC−5 (EDT)

The Tyler–Jacksonville combined statistical area is made up of two counties in East Texas. The statistical area consists of the Tyler metropolitan statistical area and the Jacksonville micropolitan statistical area. As of the 2000 census, the CSA had a population of 221,365. A July 1, 2009 estimate placed the population at 253,138.

== Counties ==
- Cherokee
- Smith

== Communities ==
=== Places with more than 100,000 people ===
- Tyler (Principal City)

=== Places with 5,000 to 15,000 people ===
- Jacksonville (Principal City)
- Rusk
- Whitehouse
- Lindale

=== Places with 1,000 to 4,999 people ===
- Alto
- Bullard
- Hideaway
- Overton (partial)
- Troup

=== Places with fewer than 1,000 people ===
- Arp
- Cuney
- Gallatin
- New Chapel Hill
- New Summerfield
- Noonday
- Reklaw (partial)
- Wells
- Winona

== Demographics ==
As of the census of 2000, there were 221,365 people, 82,343 households, and 59,009 families residing within the CSA. The racial makeup of the CSA was 72.97% White, 18.41% African American, 0.44% Native American, 0.64% Asian, 0.03% Pacific Islander, 6.10% from other races, and 1.41% from two or more races. Hispanic or Latino of any race were 11.61% of the population.

The median income for a household in the CSA was $33,231 and the median income for a family was $39,642. Males had a median income of $29,431 versus $21,070 for females. The per capita income for the CSA was $16,526.

== See also ==
- List of cities in Texas
- Texas census statistical areas
- List of Texas metropolitan areas
