= Rusk, Texas =

City in and county seat of Cherokee County, Texas, United States

- City
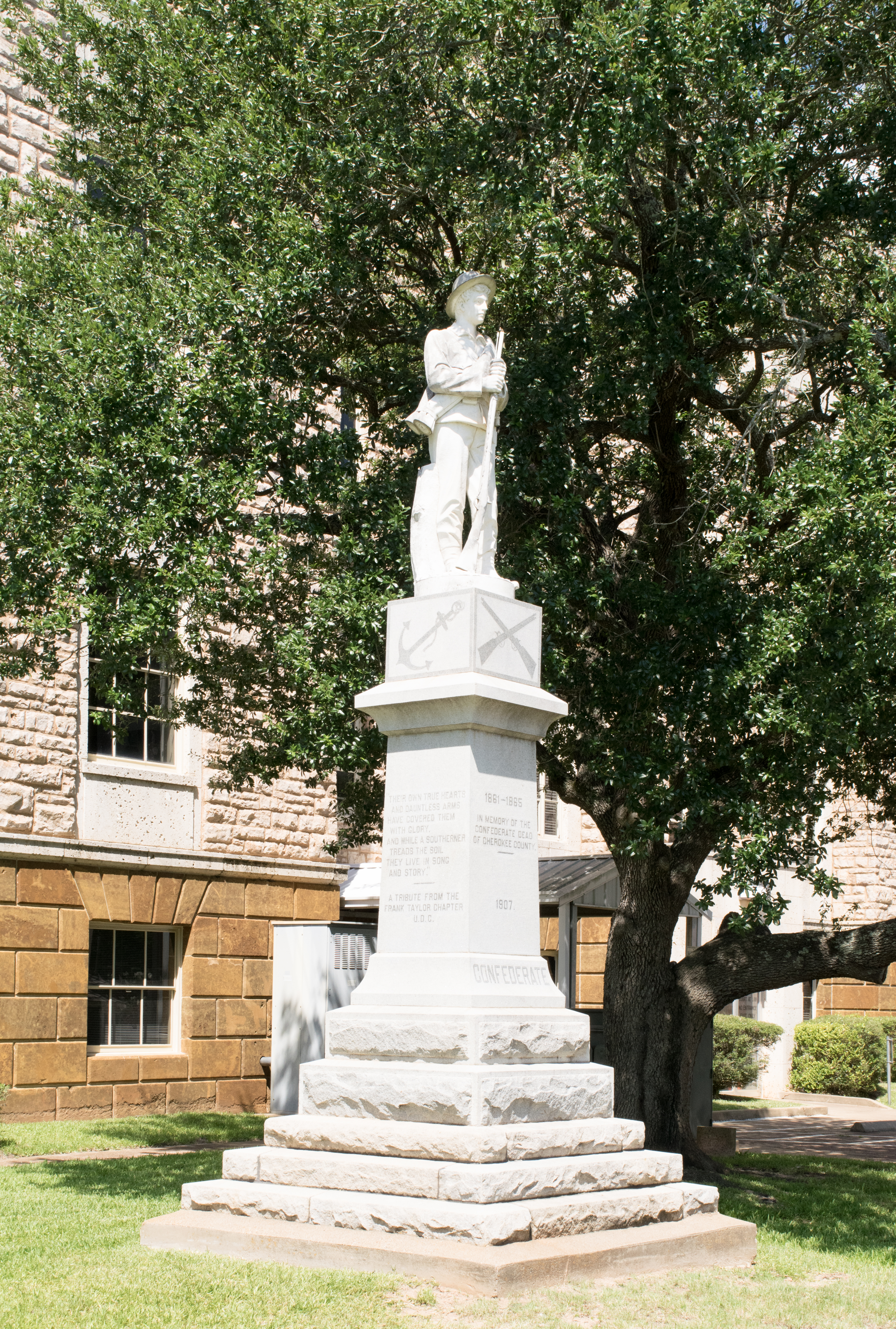
- Confederate Monument at Cherokee County Courthouse in Rusk
- Motto: "The Heart of East Texas"
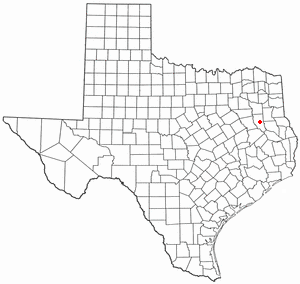
- Location of Rusk, Texas

- Coordinates: 31°47′44″N 95°09′00″W
- Country: United States
- State: Texas
- County: Cherokee

Area
  - Total: 7.26 sq mi (18.80 km^{2})
  - Land: 7.23 sq mi (18.73 km^{2})
  - Water: 0.027 sq mi (0.07 km^{2})
- Elevation: 545 ft (166 m)

Population (2020)
  - Total: 5,285
  - Density: 774.6/sq mi (299.07/km^{2})
- Time zone: UTC-6 (Central (CST))
  - Summer (DST): UTC-5 (CDT)
- ZIP code: 75785
- Area codes: 430, 903
- FIPS code: 48-63848
- GNIS feature ID: 2411017
- Website: City website

Rusk is a city in and the county seat of Cherokee County, Texas, United States. At the 2020 United States census, it had a population of 5,285.

== History ==
The city was established by an act of the Texas Legislature on April 11, 1846, named after Thomas Jefferson Rusk, signer of the Texas Declaration of Independence. By 1850, Rusk reportedly had 355 residents. A post office was authorized on March 8, 1847.

The city of Rusk is no longer dry; a beer and wine local-option election passed on May 9, 2009. Three years later, another local-option election was held to consider liquor sales; it also passed.

== Demographics ==
Historical population
Census	Pop.	Note	%±
1850	355		—
1870	545		—
1880	626		14.9%
1890	1,383		120.9%
1900	846		−38.8%
1910	1,558		84.2%
1920	2,348		50.7%
1930	3,859		64.4%
1940	5,699		47.7%
1950	6,598		15.8%
1960	4,900		−25.7%
1970	4,914		0.3%
1980	4,681		−4.7%
1990	4,366		−6.7%
2000	5,085		16.5%
2010	5,551		9.2%
2020	5,285		−4.8%
U.S. Decennial Census

=== 2020 census ===
As of the 2020 census, Rusk had a population of 5,285; the median age was 38.6 years, with 18.7% of residents under 18 and 13.5% were 65 or older. For every 100 females, there were 162.0 males, and for every 100 females 18 and over, there were 187.3 males 18 and over. None of residents lived in urban areas, while 100.0% lived in rural areas.

Of the 1,319 households in Rusk, 37.0% had children under 18 living in them, 41.2% were married-couple households, 14.7% were households with a male householder and no spouse or partner present, and 37.8% were households with a female householder and no spouse or partner present. About 26.8% of all households were made up of individuals, and 13.5% had someone living alone who was 65 or older.

The city had 1,544 housing units, of which 14.6% were vacant. The homeowner vacancy rate was 2.6% and the rental vacancy rate was 12.7%.

Racial composition as of the 2020 census
Race	Number	Percentage
White	3,112	58.9%
Black or African American	1,337	25.3%
American Indian and Alaska Native	17	0.3%
Asian	40	0.8%
Native Hawaiian and other Pacific Islander	5	0.1%
Some other race	486	9.2%
Two or more races	288	5.4%
Hispanic or Latino (of any race)	790	14.9%

=== 2020 American Community Survey ===
At the 2020 American Community Survey, the median household income was $48,235 with a mean income of $63,832.

=== 2010 census ===
At the 2010 U.S. census, 5,551 people, 1,306 households, and 867 families resided in the city. The population density was 745.4 inhabitants per square mile (287.8/km^{2}). The 1,539 housing units had an average density of 225.6 per square mile (87.1/km^{2}). The racial makeup of the city was 62.71% White, 30.01% African American, 0.18% Native American, 0.96% Asian, 5.15% from other races, and 0.98% from two or more races. Hispanics or Latinos of any race were 6.92% of the population.

=== 2000 census ===
The median income in the city for a household was $27,370 and for a family was $33,952. Males had a median income of $24,271 versus $22,438 for females. The per capita income for the city was $11,688. About 16.2% of families and 21.5% of the population were below the poverty line, including 29.4% of those under 18 and 21.0% of those 65 or over.

== Geography ==
According to the United States Census Bureau, the city has a total area of 7.3 square miles (18.8 km^{2}), of which 0.03 sq mi (0.07 km^{2}), or 0.37%, is covered by water.

Rusk is crossed by U.S. Routes 69 and 84. US 69 leads northwest 14 miles (23 km) to Jacksonville, the largest city in Cherokee County, and southeast 43 miles (69 km) to Lufkin, while US 84 leads east 30 miles (48 km) to Mount Enterprise and west the same distance to Palestine. Rusk is about 160 miles (260 km) north of Houston, 125 miles (201 km) southeast of Dallas, and 40 miles (64 km) south of Tyler.

Rusk is underlain by glauconite-rich sediments, which in most parts of the city, have weathered to dark reddish-brown, fine, sandy loam topsoil over dark red, clay subsoil characteristic of the Nacogdoches soil series.

=== Climate ===
The climate in this area is characterized by hot, humid summers and generally mild to cool winters. According to the Köppen climate classification, Rusk has a humid subtropical climate, Cfa on climate maps.

Climate data for Rusk, Texas (1991–2020 normals, extremes 1942–present)
Month	Jan	Feb	Mar	Apr	May	Jun	Jul	Aug	Sep	Oct	Nov	Dec	Year
Record high °F (°C)	83 (28)	93 (34)	94 (34)	96 (36)	99 (37)	103 (39)	107 (42)	107 (42)	110 (43)	97 (36)	89 (32)	83 (28)	110 (43)
Mean daily maximum °F (°C)	55.6 (13.1)	59.5 (15.3)	66.9 (19.4)	74.0 (23.3)	80.7 (27.1)	87.1 (30.6)	90.7 (32.6)	91.7 (33.2)	86.2 (30.1)	76.4 (24.7)	65.3 (18.5)	57.5 (14.2)	74.3 (23.5)
Daily mean °F (°C)	46.4 (8.0)	50.0 (10.0)	57.1 (13.9)	64.1 (17.8)	71.8 (22.1)	78.5 (25.8)	81.4 (27.4)	81.8 (27.7)	76.5 (24.7)	66.6 (19.2)	56.1 (13.4)	48.6 (9.2)	64.9 (18.3)
Mean daily minimum °F (°C)	37.3 (2.9)	40.5 (4.7)	47.3 (8.5)	54.3 (12.4)	62.9 (17.2)	69.9 (21.1)	72.1 (22.3)	71.9 (22.2)	66.8 (19.3)	56.8 (13.8)	46.9 (8.3)	39.8 (4.3)	55.5 (13.1)
Record low °F (°C)	0 (−18)	−3 (−19)	13 (−11)	23 (−5)	38 (3)	46 (8)	56 (13)	53 (12)	40 (4)	26 (−3)	15 (−9)	−1 (−18)	−3 (−19)
Average precipitation inches (mm)	4.36 (111)	4.26 (108)	4.46 (113)	4.04 (103)	4.58 (116)	4.51 (115)	3.38 (86)	3.35 (85)	3.67 (93)	4.65 (118)	3.98 (101)	4.88 (124)	50.12 (1,273)
Average snowfall inches (cm)	0.1 (0.25)	0.0 (0.0)	0.0 (0.0)	0.0 (0.0)	0.0 (0.0)	0.0 (0.0)	0.0 (0.0)	0.0 (0.0)	0.0 (0.0)	0.0 (0.0)	0.0 (0.0)	0.0 (0.0)	0.1 (0.25)
Average precipitation days (≥ 0.01 in)	8.6	9.6	8.7	7.5	7.8	7.2	6.3	6.5	6.7	6.9	7.9	9.4	93.1
Average snowy days (≥ 0.1 in)	0.1	0.0	0.0	0.0	0.0	0.0	0.0	0.0	0.0	0.0	0.0	0.0	0.1
Source: NOAA

== Parks and recreation ==
Jim Hogg Park and Rusk State Park are in Rusk.

The longest wooden footbridge in the nation (c. 1861) is located in Rusk.

The Texas State Railroad operates between Rusk and Palestine.

The Heritage Center of Cherokee County and Cherokee Civic Theater are located in Rusk.

== Education ==
The city of Rusk and surrounding rural areas are served by the Rusk Independent School District.

== Infrastructure ==
=== Postal service ===
The United States Postal Service operates the Rusk Post Office.

=== Rusk State Hospital ===
The Texas Department of State Health Services operates the Rusk State Hospital in Rusk. At that site, the Texas Prison System previously operated the Rusk Penitentiary.

== Notable people ==
Rusk has been home to three former governors, James Stephen Hogg, Thomas M. Campbell, and John B. Kendrick (Governor of Wyoming). Rusk has also been the home to Jim Swink, Adrian Burk, and Johnny Horton.

Anthony Denman, former Notre Dame All American, most valuable player, and former NFL player, is from Rusk. He was the first person from Rusk to play in the NFL.

Cody Glenn, a former Nebraska standout and former NFL player, is from Rusk.

MLB player Chris James was born in Rusk.

== See also ==
- List of municipalities in Texas
