= Texas State Highway 42 =

State highway in Texas

State Highway 42

Route information
- Maintained by TxDOT
- Length: 33.9 mi (54.6 km)
- Existed: 1962–present

Major junctions
- South end: US 79 / FM 1798 near Henderson
- US 259 in Kilgore; I-20 in Kilgore
- North end: US 80 at White Oak

Location
- Country: United States
- State: Texas
- Counties: Rusk, Gregg

Highway system
- Highways in Texas; Interstate; US; State; Former; Toll; Loops; Spurs; FM/RM; Park; Rec
← SH 41	→ SH 43
← SH 258	SH 259	→ SH 260

State Highway 42 (SH 42) is a state highway located in the northeastern portion of the Texas in Gregg and Rusk Counties. This route was designated on December 12, 1962, over former SH 259 because of the creation of US 259 (which replaced cancelled SH 26) through Kilgore, which it intersected.

== Previous routes ==
Historic SH 42

SH 42 was originally proposed on April 22, 1919, as a route from Greenville to Marshall. On August 21, 1923, the northwest terminus extended north to Sherman, replacing a section of SH 11. The section of SH 42 from Alba to Marshall was cancelled; SH 42 was instead rerouted to end in Mineola. On January 21, 1924, the section from Alba to Mineola was cancelled. SH 42 was instead rerouted to end in Quitman. On October 20, 1924, another section was created from Gilmer to Marshall, creating a gap. On September 21, 1925, the old route to Mineola was restored as a spur route. On December 20, 1926, the gap was to be closed, but the conditions were not met. On May 9, 1927, SH 42 was truncated to Whitewright. On March 19, 1930, the route was rerouted over the spur back to Mineola, while the section from Gilmer to Marshall was renumbered SH 155, but the section from Greenville to Whitewright was erroneously omitted from the state highway log, and the highway from Alba to Quitman was erroneously omitted from the state highway log, so had no number. On November 30, 1932, the section from Whitewright to Greenville was added back to the state highway log, and the road from Alba to Quitman was added to the state highway log as SH 182. On September 26, 1939, the entire remaining route was already part of U.S. Highway 69, so SH 42 was cancelled.

== Counties and junctions ==
County	Location	mi	km	Destinations	Notes
Rusk				US 79 / FM 1798 south – Jacksonville, Henderson	
Rusk	Price			FM 13	
Rusk				SH 64 – Arp, Henderson	
Rusk				SH 323 (Van Buren St) – New London, Overton, Henderson	
Rusk	New London			FM 1513 (Humble Rd)	
Rusk	New London			FM 850	
Rusk	New London			SH 135 west / FM 918 east	South end of SH 135 overlap
Rusk	Laird Hill			FM 2012	
Rusk	Kilgore			SH 135 north (Industrial Blvd)	North end of SH 135 overlap
Rusk	Kilgore			Bus. US 259 south (Henderson Blvd)	South end of US 259 Bus. overlap
Gregg	Kilgore			FM 1249 east (Dudley Rd)	
Gregg	Kilgore			Bus. US 259 north	North end of US 259 Bus. overlap
Gregg	Kilgore			SH 31 – Tyler, Longview	
Gregg	Kilgore			I-20 – Liberty City, Longview, Dallas	I-20 exit 587; interchange.
Gregg				FM 1252	
Gregg				FM 2206 east (Harrison Rd)	
Gregg	White Oak			US 80 – Gladewater, Longview	
1.000 mi = 1.609 km; 1.000 km = 0.621 mi
