= U.S. Route 80 in Texas =

Highway in Texas

U.S. Highway 80
- US 80 highlighted in red

Route information
- Maintained by TxDOT
- Length: 155.251 mi (Note: The certified mileage given is shorter than the actual mileage as TxDOT considers US 80 to be discontinuous rather than concurrent with I-20 between Marshall and Waskom.) (249.852 km)
- Existed: 1927–present
- History: Continued into New Mexico prior to 1991.

Major junctions
- West end: I-30 / US 67 at Dallas-Mesquite border
- I-635 in Mesquite; Spur 557 near Terrell; US 69 in Mineola; US 271 in Gladewater; US 259 in Longview; Future I-369 / US 59 in Marshall; I-20 in Waskom
- East end: US 80 at the Louisiana state line near Waskom

Location
- Country: United States
- State: Texas
- Counties: Dallas, Kaufman, Van Zandt, Smith, Wood, Upshur, Gregg, Harrison

Highway system
- United States Numbered Highway System; List; Special; Divided; Highways in Texas; Interstate; US; State; Former; Toll; Loops; Spurs; FM/RM; Park; Rec
← SH 79	→ SH 80

U.S. Route 80 (also known as U.S. Highway 80 and US 80) is a U.S. highway that begins in the state of Texas in Dallas at an interchange with I-30. US 80 runs in an east–west direction for most of its length from Dallas to Louisiana. Before the advent of the Interstate Highway System, US 80 through Texas was once a vital link in a major transcontinental highway with the national western terminus being in San Diego, California rather than Dallas. Since 1991, most of US 80 in Texas has been decommissioned in favor of I-10, I-20 and I-30 between the New Mexico state line and its current western terminus.

== Route description ==
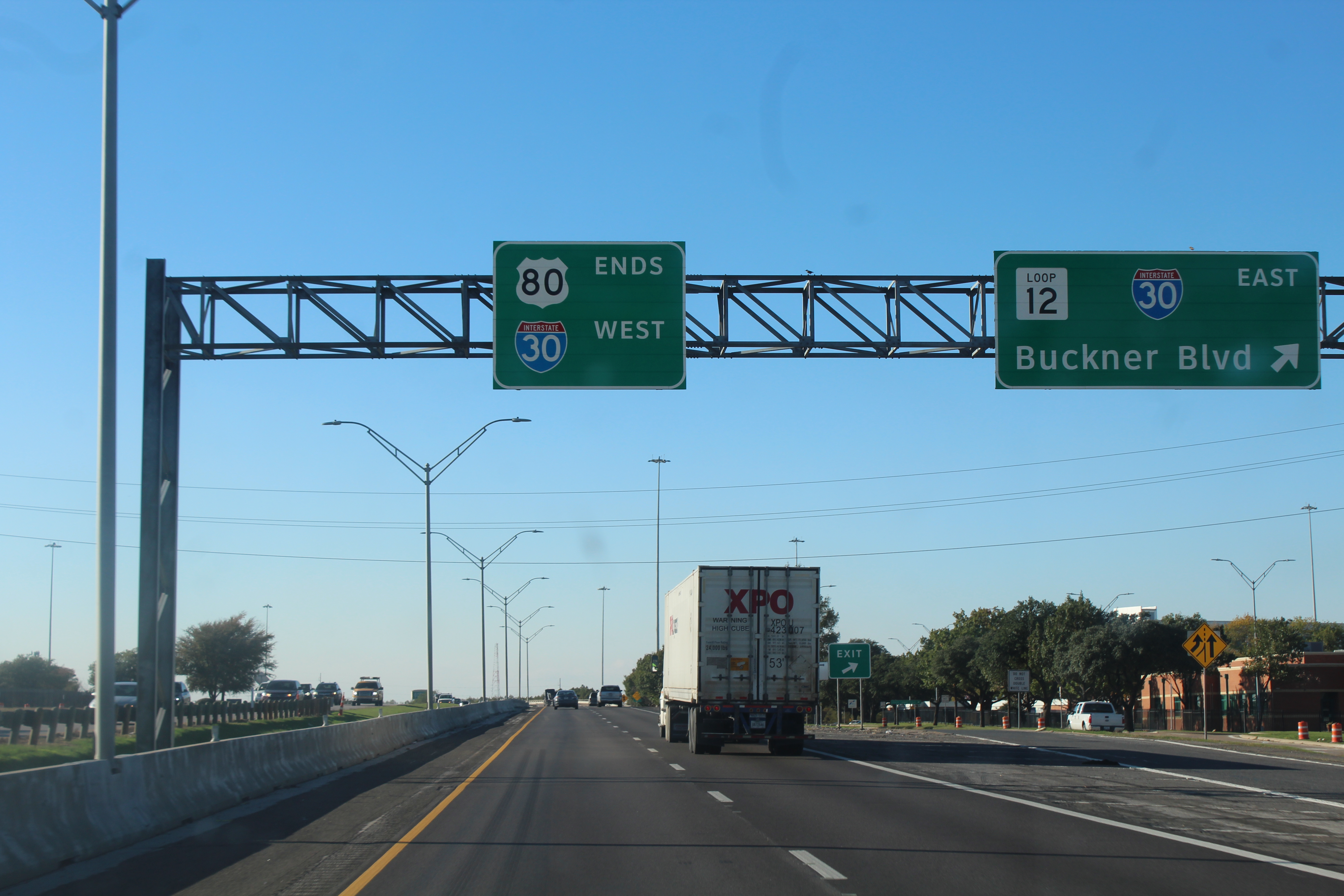
Western terminus in Dallas

The current highway begins as a freeway at I-30 (also unsigned US 67) in Dallas, almost in Mesquite. The freeway continues east into Mesquite where it meets I-635 at a stack interchange. East of I-635, the US 80 freeway serves as the northern terminus of SH 352, the main highway into downtown Mesquite. Bisecting Samuell Park, US 80 enters Sunnyvale, then crosses into Kaufman County. The freeway makes a curve to the southeast, skirting the town of Forney. US 80 is the main highway and only freeway serving the town. Though there is no business loop through Forney proper, FM 688, which runs the entire length of Broad Street through town, serves a similar function. On the outskirts of Terrell, US 80 leaves the freeway and becomes a four lane divided highway known as Moore Avenue, intersecting SH 205 on the western edge of town, then SH 34 Bus. and SH 34 in the center of Terrell. The remainder of the freeway between Terrell and I-20 makes up the full route of Spur 557. The entire US 80/Spur 557 freeway was a section of I-20 until 1987, when the Interstate was moved onto a new freeway through Lawson and Heartland. A pair of frontage roads services the entire US 80 segment of the freeway, except for a small area west of Forney, where US 80 crosses a bridge over the East Fork Trinity River.

In Terrell, US 80 serves as the major east–west highway in the town, passing through the town square. US 80 leaves Terrell serving smaller communities, such as Elmo. US 80 intersects SH 19 east of Edgewood. The highway runs in mostly a straight line from Terrell to Mineola, where it intersects US 69 about 30 miles north of Tyler.

US 80 leaves Mineola running in a slight southeast direction towards Longview. From here, the highway turns in a slight northeast direction traveling into Marshall. The highway soon overlaps I-20, leaving the interstate to serve the community of Waskom. The two highways cross into Louisiana, parallel with each other traveling to Shreveport.

== History ==
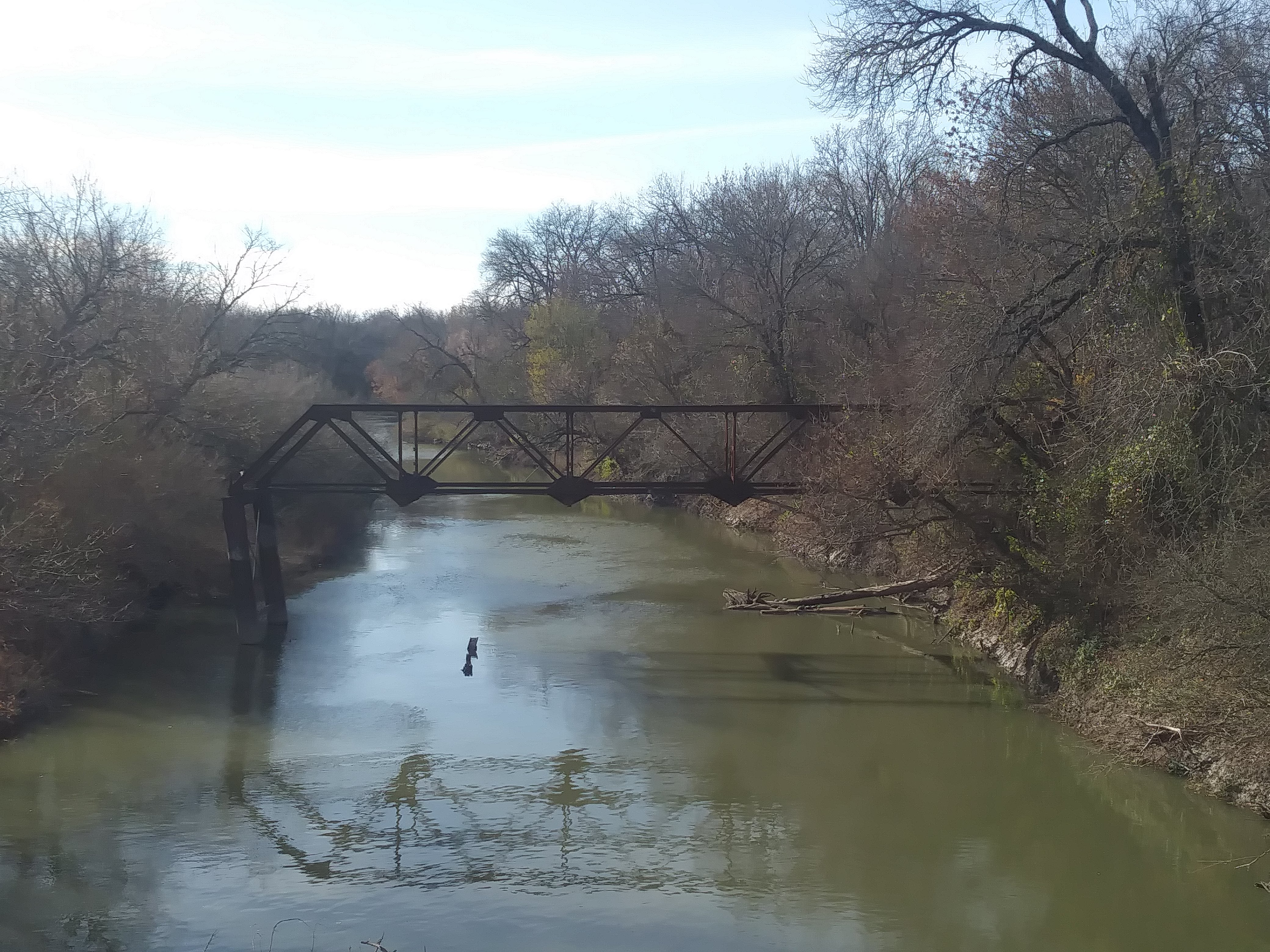
Former US Route 80 over East Fork Trinity River

The current route of US 80 in Texas is significantly shorter than it was when the highway was first commissioned in 1927. The highway in Texas used to run from the New Mexico state line, near El Paso, to the Louisiana state line, via Pecos, Odessa, Abilene, Weatherford, Fort Worth, Dallas, Longview and Marshall. Nationally, US 80 ran from Savannah, Georgia to San Diego, California, being a major transcontinental highway. Beginning in the 1950s, much of the highway was bypassed/replaced by the Interstate Highway System. US 80 has been replaced by I-10 from New Mexico to I-20, southwest of Pecos. The rest of the highway has been replaced by I-20 and I-30 from Pecos to Louisiana. Replacement by the Interstates made US 80 an obsolete highway to the southwestern states. Between 1964 and 1989, US 80 was decommissioned entirely within California, Arizona and all of New Mexico outside of Anthony (which is located near the Texas state line). In 1991, the remainder of US 80 in both New Mexico and Texas west of Dallas was decommissioned, bringing the national western terminus to its current location. The old highway west of Dallas has since been replaced by local roads and state highways.

== Major intersections ==
All exits are unnumbered.

County	Location	mi	km	Destinations	Notes
Dallas	Dallas	0.00	0.00	I-30 (US 67) / Loop 12 (Buckner Boulevard)	I-30 exit 53B eastbound; no access from I-30 west to US 80 east
Dallas	Mesquite	0.5	0.80	Big Town Boulevard	I-30 exit 54
Dallas	Mesquite	1.3	2.1	Town East Boulevard	
Dallas	Mesquite	2.5	4.0	Galloway Avenue / Gross Road / Gus Thomasson Road	Access to Dallas Regional Medical Center
Dallas	Mesquite	3.1	5.0	I-635	I-635 exit 6
Dallas	Mesquite	4.8	7.7	Belt Line Road	Access to Dallas Regional Medical Center
Dallas	Sunnyvale	6.1	9.8	SH 352 (Collins Road)	Access to Baylor Scott & White Medical Center – Sunnyvale
Dallas	Sunnyvale	8.4	13.5	East Fork Road	
Dallas–Kaufman county line	Sunnyvale	9.5	15.3	Lawson Road	Eastbound exit and entrance
Kaufman	Forney	11.2	18.0	FM 460 (Clements Drive)	
Kaufman	Forney	12.2	19.6	FM 688 (Broad Street) / FM 740 (Pinson Road)	
Kaufman	Forney	13.9	22.4	FM 548	
Kaufman	Forney	15.4	24.8	County Road 212 / Reeder Road	
Kaufman	Forney	16.5	26.6	Gateway Boulevard	
Kaufman	Forney	17.4	28.0	Windmill Farms Boulevard	
Kaufman		19.0	30.6	Spur 557 east to I-20 – Shreveport	East end of freeway
Kaufman	Lawrence	20.7	33.3	FM 1392 north	
Kaufman	Terrell	23.0	37.0	SH 205 north / FM 148 south – Rockwall, Crandall	
Kaufman	Terrell	24.4	39.3	FM 986 north (Rockwall Avenue)	
Kaufman	Terrell	24.7	39.8	Spur 226 south (Virginia Street) to SH 34	
Kaufman	Terrell	25.2	40.6	Spur 87 north (Dellis Street) – Terrell State Hospital	
Kaufman	Terrell	26.0	41.8	FM 429 north – Lake Tawakoni	West end of FM 429 overlap
Kaufman	Terrell	26.5	42.6	FM 429 south – College Mound	East end of FM 429 overlap
Kaufman	Elmo	31.1	50.1	FM 2728 south to FM 429	West end of FM 2728 overlap
Kaufman	Elmo	31.3	50.4	FM 2728 north to FM 429	East end of FM 2728 overlap
Van Zandt	Wills Point	39.6	63.7	FM 2965 south to I-20	
Van Zandt	Wills Point	40.4	65.0	FM 47 (Fourth Street) – Lake Tawakoni, Mabank	
Van Zandt	Wills Point	41.4	66.6	SH 64 east – Canton	
Van Zandt	Edgewood	47.4	76.3	FM 1504 south	
Van Zandt	Edgewood	47.7	76.8	FM 859 – Downtown, Canton	
Van Zandt		50.6	81.4	SH 19 – Emory, Canton	
Van Zandt	Grand Saline	58.2	93.7	SH 110 south / FM 17 south (Main Street) – Van, Canton	West end of FM 17 overlap
Van Zandt	Grand Saline	58.7	94.5	FM 17 north – Lake Fork	East end of FM 17 overlap
Van Zandt	Grand Saline	58.8	94.6	FM 857 east – Sand Flat, Alba	
Van Zandt	Silver Lake	64.9	104.4	FM 1255 west – Canton	
Smith		65.9	106.1	FM 1253 south – Jamestown	
Wood		67.3	108.3	FM 1799 north – Lake Holbrook, Golden	
Wood	Mineola	70.6	113.6	Loop 564 east (truck route) to US 69 north / SH 37 north	
Wood	Mineola	71.4	114.9	US 69 (Pacific Street) to SH 37	
Wood	Mineola	71.9	115.7	FM 1801 east (Mimosa Street)	
Wood	Mineola	72.9	117.3	Loop 564 (truck route) to FM 1801	Interchange
Wood		75.7	121.8	FM 2422 south	
Wood	Hoard	77.6	124.9	FM 1804 south – Lindale	
Wood	Hoard	77.7	125.0	FM 1801 west	
Wood		80.6	129.7	FM 3056 north	
Wood	Crow	82.2	132.3	FM 778 north – Hainesville	
Wood		84.5	136.0	FM 2869 north – Holly Lake Ranch, Fouke, Lake Hawkins	
Wood	Hawkins	88.8	142.9	FM 14 – Holly Lake Ranch, Tyler	
Wood		91.1	146.6	FM 2659 west	
Upshur	Big Sandy	93.6	150.6	SH 155 south – Tyler	West end of SH 155 overlap
Upshur	Big Sandy	94.5	152.1	SH 155 north (North Tyler Street) – Gilmer	East end of SH 155 overlap
Upshur	Gladewater	103.2	166.1	FM 2685 north	
Gregg	Gladewater	105.4	169.6	US 271 (truck route) – Gilmer, Kilgore, Tyler	
Gregg	Gladewater	106.2	170.9	Loop 485 (truck route) to US 271	
Gregg	White Oak	110.3	177.5	FM 3272 north	
Gregg	White Oak	110.9	178.5	SH 42 south – Kilgore	
Gregg	Longview	114.1	183.6	Loop 281 – UTT Longview, Texas Baptist College, LeTourneau University, East Texas Regional Airport	
Gregg	Longview	114.3	183.9	FM 1845 north (Pine Tree Road) / Cherokee Street	
Gregg	Longview	115.8	186.4	SH 300 north (Gilmer Road) – Gilmer	
Gregg	Longview	116.9	188.1	SH 31 west / Spur 63 north – Kilgore, Tyler	
Gregg	Longview	117.5	189.1	Spur 502 north (North High Street) – Kilgore College	
Gregg	Longview	118.6	190.9	FM 2208 east (Alpine Street)	
Gregg	Longview	119.3	192.0	US 259 / SH 149 south (Eastman Road)	
Harrison	Longview	121.5	195.5	Loop 281 to I-20	Interchange
Harrison	Hallsville	127.4	205.0	FM 450 (Central Street) to I-20 – Harleton	
Harrison		135.4	217.9	FM 968 west	
Harrison		136.0	218.9	FM 3379 east	
Harrison	Marshall	138.4	222.7	Loop 390 (Ernest Smith Parkway / M.L. King Jr. Boulevard)	
Harrison	Marshall	139.8	225.0	FM 1997 north (Grove Street) – East Texas Baptist University, Wiley College	
Harrison	Marshall	141.0	226.9	US 59 / SH 43 (East End Boulevard North) – Texas State Technical College	
Harrison	Marshall	143.3	230.6	FM 1998 east – Scottsville	
Harrison		144.7	232.9	Loop 390 north (Ernest F. Smith Parkway)	Future Interstate 369
Harrison		147.9	238.0	FM 2199 – Scottsville	
Harrison		152.7	245.7	I-20 west – Dallas	West end of I-20 overlap; US 80 west follows exit 628
Harrison		157.3	253.1	I-20 east / FM 134 north to FM 9 – Shreveport, Caddo Lake, Jonesville	East end of I-20 overlap; US 80 east follows exit 633
Harrison	Waskom	159.5	256.7	FM 9 south – Panola	West end of FM 9 overlap
Harrison	Waskom	159.7	257.0	FM 9 north	East end of FM 9 overlap
Harrison	Waskom	160.4	258.1	Spur 156 south to I-20	
Harrison		161.1	259.3	US 80 east – Greenwood, Shreveport	Continuation into Louisiana
1.000 mi = 1.609 km; 1.000 km = 0.621 mi: Concurrency terminus; Incomplete access

== See also ==
=== Related Routes ===
- U.S. Route 180
- Texas State Highway 20
- Texas State Highway 180
- Texas State Highway 352
- Texas State Highway Spur 557
- Texas State Highway Spur 580

== Notes ==
U.S. Route 80
Previous state: New Mexico	Texas	Next state: Louisiana
