= Texas State Highway 135 =

State highway in Texas

State Highway 135
- SH 135, highlighted in red

Route information
- Maintained by TxDOT
- Length: 46.7 mi (75.2 km)
- Existed: 1928–present

Major junctions
- South end: US 69 at Jacksonville
- I-20 in Liberty City
- North end: US 271 near Gladewater

Location
- Country: United States
- State: Texas
- Counties: Cherokee, Smith, Rusk, Gregg

Highway system
- Highways in Texas; Interstate; US; State; Former; Toll; Loops; Spurs; FM/RM; Park; Rec
← SH 134	→ SH 136

State Highway 135 (SH 135) is a state highway in the U.S. state of Texas that runs from Jacksonville, through Kilgore, to near Gladewater.

== History ==
SH 135 was designated on June 22, 1928, from Troup to the Rusk County line. On March 19, 1930, it was extended to Gladewater, replacing SH 15A. On October 27, 1953, an extension to Jacksonville along FM 347 was signed but not designated. On February 20, 1963, SH 135 was rerouted concurrent with SH 42, with the old route being transferred to FM 918 and Spur 378. The extension to Jacksonville was official designated on August 29, 1990, completing the current route and cancelling this section of FM 347.

== Major intersections ==
County	Location	mi	km	Destinations	Notes
Cherokee	Jacksonville			US 69 (Jackson St) – Bullard, Rusk	
Cherokee				FM 2064 east	
Cherokee				FM 177 west to FM 3052	
Cherokee				FM 2064 south	
Smith	Troup			SH 110 west (Duval St) – Whitehouse	South end of SH 110 overlap
Smith	Troup			SH 110 south (Georgia St) – New Summerfield	North end of SH 110 overlap
Smith	Troup			FM 13 east (Duval St)	
Smith	Troup			FM 15 east (Bryant St)	
Smith				FM 345 west	
Smith	Arp			Spur 80 south (Main St)	
Smith	Arp			SH 64 – Tyler, Henderson	Interchange
Smith				FM 838 east	
Rusk	Overton			FM 2089 south	
Rusk	Overton			SH 323 east (Van Buren St) – Henderson	
Rusk	Overton			FM 850 (Henderson St)	
Rusk	New London			SH 42 south (Main St) / FM 918 east – Price	South end of SH 42 overlap
Rusk	Laird Hill			FM 2012	
Rusk	Kilgore			SH 42 north (Woodlawn St)	North end of SH 42 overlap
Gregg	Kilgore			SH 31 – Tyler, Longview	Interchange
Gregg	Liberty City			I-20 – Terrell, Longview	I-20 exit 583; interchange.
Gregg	Liberty City			FM 1252 (Kilgore Rd)	
Gregg				FM 2207 east	
Gregg				US 271 – Tyler, Gladewater	
1.000 mi = 1.609 km; 1.000 km = 0.621 mi
