= Wright City =

Wright City can refer to one of the following places:

- Wright City, Missouri
- Wright City, Oklahoma
- Wright City, Texas
- Wright City, Wyoming
