= List of Farm to Market Roads in Texas (2200–2299) =

- Texas Farm to Market Road and Ranch to Market Road markers

Highway names
- Interstates: Interstate Highway X (IH-X, I-X)
- US Highways: U.S. Highway X (US X)
- State: State Highway X (SH X)
- Loops: Loop X
- Spurs: Spur X
- Recreational: Recreational Road X (RE X)
- Farm or Ranch to Market Roads: Farm to Market Road X (FM X); Ranch to Market Road X (RM X)
- Park Roads: Park Road X (PR X)

System links
- Highways in Texas; Interstate; US; State; Former; Toll; Loops; Spurs; FM/RM; Park; Rec

Farm to Market Roads in Texas are owned and maintained by the Texas Department of Transportation (TxDOT).

== FM 2200 ==
Farm to Market Road 2200
- Location: Medina County
- Length: 33.418 mi (Note: The certified length given is shorter than the actual mileage, as the Texas Department of Transportation description of FM 2200 considers it to be discontinuous at rather than concurrent with FM 462.) (53.781 km)
- Existed: October 31, 1958–present

Farm to Market Road 2200 (FM 2200) is located in Medina County.

FM 2200 begins at an intersection with US 90 in D'Hanis. The highway travels in a southern direction along the eastern edge of the town, leaving the city limits near County Road 5223. FM 2200 generally runs in a southern direction through rural farming areas, turning east at County Road 731. The highway has an overlap with FM 462 near Yancey. After leaving Yancey, FM 2200 mostly runs in an eastern direction towards Devine, ending at an intersection with SH 173.

The current FM 2200 was designated on October 31, 1958, running from SH 173 in Devine westward to FM 462 near Yancey at a distance of 14.2 miles (22.9 km). The highway was extended 5.1 miles (8.2 km) northwest of FM 462 on May 2, 1962, creating an overlap with that highway. FM 2200 was extended 11.0 miles (17.7 km) to US 90 on May 6, 1964.

Junction list

The entire route is in Medina County.

Location	mi	km	Destinations	Notes
D'Hanis	0.0	0.0	US 90 – Uvalde, Hondo	
Yancey	19.7	31.7	FM 462 north – Hondo	West end of FM 462 overlap
	20.3	32.7	FM 462 south – Moore	East end of FM 462 overlap
Devine	34.1	54.9	SH 173 – Hondo, Jourdanton	
1.000 mi = 1.609 km; 1.000 km = 0.621 mi: Concurrency terminus

=== FM 2200 (1953) ===
Farm to Market Road 2200
- Location: Wilson County
- Existed: October 29, 1953–October 29, 1954

A previous route numbered FM 2200 was designated on October 29, 1953, traveling from SH 123 near Stockdale, southwestward to a road intersection at a distance of 5.9 miles (9.5 km). The highway was cancelled and combined with FM 537 on October 29, 1954.

== FM 2201 ==
Farm to Market Road 2201
- Location: Palo Pinto County
- Length: 6.414 mi (10.322 km)
- Existed: December 2, 1953–present

Farm to Market Road 2201 (FM 2201) is located in Palo Pinto County.

FM 2201 begins at an intersection with FM 4 in Santo. The highway travels in a northeast direction before turning in a more eastern direction near the Santo Volunteer Fire Department. FM 2201 continues to travel in a mostly eastern direction through rural farming areas, ending at an intersection with US 281 just north of I-20.

FM 2201 was designated on December 2, 1953, along the current route.

== FM 2202 ==
Farm to Market Road 2202
- Location: Moore County
- Length: 5.186 mi (8.346 km)
- Existed: October 28, 1953–present

Farm to Market Road 2202 (FM 2202) is located in Moore County in the Panhandle. It runs from SH 354 northward 5.2 miles (8.4 km) to FM 722 southwest of Dumas.

FM 2202 was designated on October 28, 1953, along the current route.

== FM 2203 ==
Farm to Market Road 2203
- Location: Moore County
- Length: 4.069 mi (6.548 km)
- Existed: 1953–present

Farm to Market Road 2203 (FM 2203) is located in Moore County in the Panhandle.

FM 2203 begins at an intersection with SH 152 in Dumas. The highway travels in a northern direction along Maddox Avenue through a suburban area of the town. FM 2203 leaves Dumas at an intersection with McClary Lane, with the route becoming more rural. The highway travels in a northern direction through rural farming and ranching areas, ending at an intersection with FM 119 near the North Plains Country Club.

FM 2203 was designated on October 28, 1953, along the current route.

== FM 2204 ==
Farm to Market Road 2204
- Location: Gregg County
- Length: 8.636 mi (13.898 km)
- Existed: October 28, 1953–present

Farm to Market Road 2204 (FM 2204) is located in Gregg County. It runs from US 259 Bus. in Kilgore east to SH 322 at East Texas Regional Airport. It is known locally as Stone Road. FM 2204 was designated on October 28, 1953, along its current route.

Junction list

The entire route is in Gregg County.

Location	mi	km	Destinations	Notes
Kilgore	0.0	0.0	Bus. US 259	
Kilgore	2.0	3.2	US 259 – Longview, Henderson	Interchange
	3.4	5.5	FM 2276 – Longview, Henderson	
	7.0	11.3	FM 2011 – Longview, Henderson	
	8.6	13.8	SH 322 – Lakeport, Henderson, East Texas Regional Airport	
1.000 mi = 1.609 km; 1.000 km = 0.621 mi

== FM 2205 ==
Farm to Market Road 2205
- Location: Gregg County
- Length: 0.613 mi (987 m)
- Existed: October 28, 1953–present

Farm to Market Road 2205 (FM 2205) is located in Gregg County. Known locally as Jaycee Road, it runs from Loop 281 east to SH 31 in Longview.

FM 2205 was designated on October 28, 1953, along its current route. On June 27, 1995, the route was redesignated Urban Road 2205 (UR 2205). The designation reverted to FM 2205 with the elimination of the Urban Road system on November 15, 2018.

== FM 2206 ==
Farm to Market Road 2206
- Location: Gregg County
- Length: 3.681 mi (5.924 km)
- Existed: 1953–present

Farm to Market Road 2206 (FM 2206) is located in Gregg County. Known locally as Harrison Road, it runs from SH 42 near White Oak east to Loop 281 in Longview.

FM 2206 was designated on October 28, 1953, along its current route. On June 27, 1995, the route was redesignated Urban Road 2206 (UR 2206). The designation reverted to FM 2206 with the elimination of the Urban Road system on November 15, 2018.

== FM 2207 ==
Farm to Market Road 2207
- Location: Gregg County
- Length: 5.987 mi (9.635 km)
- Existed: 1953–present

Farm to Market Road 2207 (FM 2207) is located in Gregg County. It begins at SH 135, near that route's junction with I-20, northwest of Kilgore. FM 2207 runs to the northwest, crossing FM 1252, before ending at another intersection with SH 135 between Liberty City and Gladewater.

FM 2207 was designated on October 28, 1953, from SH 135 south to FM 1252. On October 26, 1954, it was extended south to its current southern terminus at SH 135.

== FM 2208 ==
Farm to Market Road 2208
- Location: Gregg, Harrison, and Marion counties
- Length: 24.176 mi (Note: The certified length given is shorter than the actual mileage, as the Texas Department of Transportation description of FM 2208 considers it to be discontinuous at rather than concurrent with FM 449.) (38.908 km)
- Existed: 1953–present

Farm to Market Road 2208 (FM 2208) is located in Gregg, Harrison, and Marion counties. It runs from US 80 in Longview northeast to FM 134 near Jefferson.

FM 2208 was designated on October 28, 1953, from US 80 to the Harrison County line. On October 31, 1957, it was extended to FM 449. On December 31, 1959, it replaced FM 449 to its intersection with FM 450; it also replaced FM 2256 from FM 450 to FM 134. On October 27, 1963, the section from FM 450 to FM 2657 was transferred to FM 449, along with FM 2657 itself. On June 27, 1995, the section from FM 2879 to US 80 was redesignated Urban Road 2208 (UR 2208). The designation reverted to FM 2208 with the elimination of the Urban Road system on November 15, 2018.

Junction list

County	Location	mi	km	Destinations	Notes
Gregg	Longview	0.0	0.0	US 80 (Marshall Avenue) – White Oak, Hallsville	
Gregg	Longview	1.0	1.6	US 259 (Eastman Road) – Ore City, Kilgore	
Gregg	Longview	2.1	3.4	Loop 281	Interchange; access to Longview Regional Hospital
Harrison		2.9	4.7	FM 2879 north	
Harrison		8.5	13.7	FM 449 west	South end of FM 449 overlap
Harrison		12.5	20.1	FM 450 south – Hallsville	South end of FM 450 overlap
Harrison		12.6	20.3	FM 449 east – Marshall	North end of FM 449 overlap
Harrison		17.0	27.4	FM 450 north – Harleton	North end of FM 450 overlap
Harrison		18.2	29.3	SH 154 – Harleton, Nesbitt	
Marion		25.4	40.9	FM 3001 – Marshall	
Marion		31.4	50.5	US 59 (Future I-369) – Jefferson, Marshall	U.S. 59 is the future Interstate 369
Marion		32.5	52.3	FM 134 – Karnack, Caddo Lake State Park, Cypress River Airport	
1.000 mi = 1.609 km; 1.000 km = 0.621 mi

== FM 2209 ==
Farm to Market Road 2209
- Location: Willacy County
- Length: 6.558 mi (10.554 km)
- Existed: 1953–present

Farm to Market Road 2209 (FM 2209) is located in Willacy County.

FM 2209 begins at an intersection with County Road 380. The highway travels in an eastern direction, turning south at an unnamed county road. FM 2209 intersects FM 3142, then travels through the town of San Perlita. The highway continues to travel in a southern direction, ending at an intersection with SH 186.

FM 2209 was designated on December 2, 1953, traveling from SH 186 (current junction with FM 3142) at San Perlita northward to a road intersection at a distance of 1.7 miles (2.7 km). The highway was extended 3.4 miles (5.5 km) east and south to FM 497 on May 2, 1962. FM 2209 was extended 3.6 miles (5.8 km) north and west from its previous north end at a road intersection to another road intersection on May 5, 1966. On May 31, 1973, the highway's routing was changed, with the old route east of San Perlita being renumbered FM 3142, while FM 2209 was rerouted replacing a section of SH 186 to FM 497. SH 186 was truncated, but SH 186 was signed but not designated along FM 497. The redesignation of FM 497 to SH 186 became official on August 26, 1990.

== FM 2210 ==
Farm to Market Road 2210
- Location: Jack and Wise counties
- Length: 29.794 mi (47.949 km)
- Existed: 1953–present

Farm to Market Road 2210 (FM 2210) is located in Jack and Wise counties.

FM 2210 begins at an intersection with FM 4 in the Bartons Chapel area. The highway travels in an eastern direction, turning south at Pump Station Road, then turning back east near Heliport Road. FM 2210 continues to run in an eastern direction, intersecting US 281 in Perrin. A few miles east of Perrin, the highway turns north at Lone Star Road, intersects SH 199 southeast of Joplin, then turns back to the east near Willow Point. FM 2210 continues to run in an eastern direction, ending at an intersection with FM 920 in Balsora.

FM 2210 was designated on October 28, 1953, traveling from SH 199 southward to Gibtown at a distance of 3.0 miles (4.8 km). On September 20, 1961, a farm-to-market road from Gibtown to FM 2350 was designated. The highway was extended 13.4 miles (21.6 km) to a road intersection northwest of Perrin on October 3, 1961, absorbing all of FM 2350. The highway was extended 6.1 miles (9.8 km) westward to FM 206 (now FM 4) on June 28, 1963. FM 2210 was extended 3.9 miles (6.3 km) northeast of SH 199 to the Wise County line on May 5, 1966. The highway was extended 5.3 miles (8.5 km) to FM 920 at Balsora on May 7, 1970.

Junction list

County	Location	mi	km	Destinations	Notes
Jack		0.0	0.0	FM 4 – Jacksboro, Graford	
Jack	Perrin	11.6	18.7	US 281 – Jacksboro, Mineral Wells	
Jack		21.7	34.9	SH 199 – Jacksboro, Fort Worth	
Wise	Balsora	29.8	48.0	FM 920 – Bridgeport, Weatherford	
1.000 mi = 1.609 km; 1.000 km = 0.621 mi

== FM 2211 ==
Farm to Market Road 2211
- Location: Stonewall County
- Length: 14.64 mi (23.56 km)
- Existed: 1954–present

== FM 2212 ==
Farm to Market Road 2212
- Location: Dawson, Martin, and Howard counties
- Length: 10.464 mi (16.840 km)
- Existed: 1953–present

== FM 2213 ==
Farm to Market Road 2213
- Location: San Augustine County
- Length: 4.203 mi (6.764 km)
- Existed: February 24, 1954–present

Farm to Market Road 2213 (FM 2213) is located in San Augustine County. It runs from US 96 northward 4.2 miles (6.8 km) to SH 21 in San Augustine.

FM 2213 was established on February 24, 1954, along the current route.

== FM 2214 ==
Farm to Market Road 2214
- Location: Eastland County
- Length: 14.674 mi (23.616 km)
- Existed: 1954–present

== FM 2215 ==
Farm to Market Road 2215
- Location: Henderson County
- Length: 1.339 mi (2.155 km)
- Existed: April 25, 1978–present

Farm to Market Road 2215 (FM 2215) is located in southeast Henderson County. It runs about 1.3 miles (2.1 km) within Berryville, from SH 155 north of Frankston eastward to CR 4117, near the western shore of Lake Palestine.

The current FM 2215 was commissioned on April 25, 1978.

=== FM 2215 (1954) ===
Farm to Market Road 2215
- Location: Erath County
- Existed: January 27, 1954–August 1, 1967

A previous route numbered FM 2215 was designated in Erath County on January 27, 1954, running 1.2 miles (1.9 km) from FM 8 near Stephenville southeastward to US 67. FM 2215 was removed from the state highway system on August 1, 1967, in exchange for FM 988, and was cancelled when that route opened.

== FM 2216 ==
Farm to Market Road 2216
- Location: Fannin and Lamar counties
- Length: 4.661 mi (7.501 km)
- Existed: May 6, 1964–present

=== FM 2216 (1953) ===
Farm to Market Road 2216
- Location: Hansford County
- Existed: December 1, 1953–November 21, 1963

A previous route numbered FM 2216 was designated on December 1, 1953, from the Oklahoma state line south, southeast, and south 18.4 miles (29.6 km) to FM 289 (now SH 15) at Gruver. FM 2216 was cancelled on November 21, 1963, and transferred to SH 136.

== FM 2217 ==
Farm to Market Road 2217
- Location: Hudspeth County
- Length: 1.27 mi (2.04 km)
- Existed: 1954–present

Farm to Market Road 2217 (FM 2217) is located in Hudspeth County. It connects I-10 with FM 192.

FM 2217 runs southward from I-10 at exit 81 about 4 miles (6.4 km) east of McNary, then eastward before ending at FM 192.

On February 25, 1954, FM 2217 was designated from US 80 (present-day I-10) southeastward to FM 192.

== FM 2218 ==
Farm to Market Road 2218
- Location: Fort Bend County
- Length: 5.657 mi (9.104 km)
- Existed: 1954–present

Farm to Market Road 2218 (FM 2218) is located in Fort Bend County. The highway begins at SH 36 in Pleak, heads northeast through Rosenberg and ends at FM 1640 in Richmond.

FM 2218 begins at a traffic signal on SH 36 in Pleak. There is a filling station on the northeast corner and the Pleak City Hall is nearby. The highway immediately heads northeast. On the outskirts of Pleak, FM 2218 curves north, then it turns north-northeast near the Meadow Bend Park Estates subdivision. Near Lane Airpark, the highway veers northeast again. At a distance 3.8 miles (6.1 km) from its starting point, the highway comes to the I-69/US 59 overpass. FM 2218 continues northeast from I-69/US 59 through Rosenberg, with traffic lights at Airport Avenue, Avenue N, Reading Road and Town Center Boulevard. This stretch of the highway is also known as B. F. Terry Boulevard. B. F. Terry High School in the Lamar Consolidated Independent School District is situated on the northwest side of FM 2218 between Airport and Avenue N. The highway ends at a traffic signal on FM 1640. There is a Walmart on the south side and a Wharton County Junior College campus on the north side.

FM 2218 was first designated on March 24, 1954, to run from FM 1640 at Richmond to SH 36 at Pleak. Since its original authorization there has been no change to the route.

Junction list

The entire highway is in Fort Bend County.

Location	mi	km	Destinations	Notes
Pleak	0.0	0.0	SH 36 – Rosenberg, West Columbia	Southern terminus of FM 2218
Rosenberg	3.7– 3.8	6.0– 6.1	I-69 / US 59 (Southwest Freeway) / Bryan Road – Houston, Victoria	I-69/US 59 exit 99
Richmond	5.7	9.2	FM 1640 (Avenue I) – Rosenberg, Richmond	Northern terminus of FM 2218
1.000 mi = 1.609 km; 1.000 km = 0.621 mi

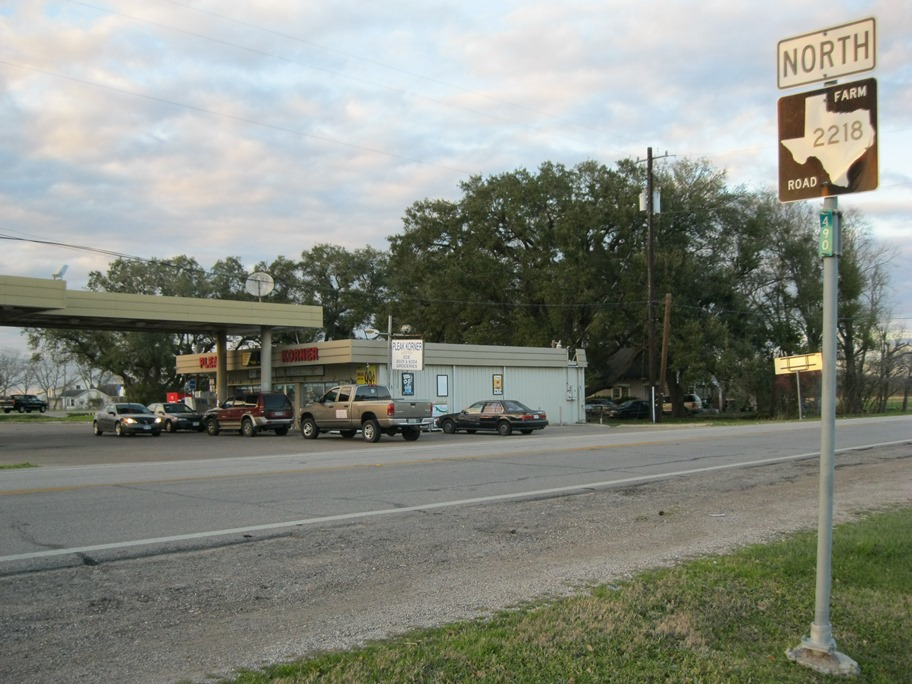
Petrol station on FM 2218 near SH 36 in Pleak

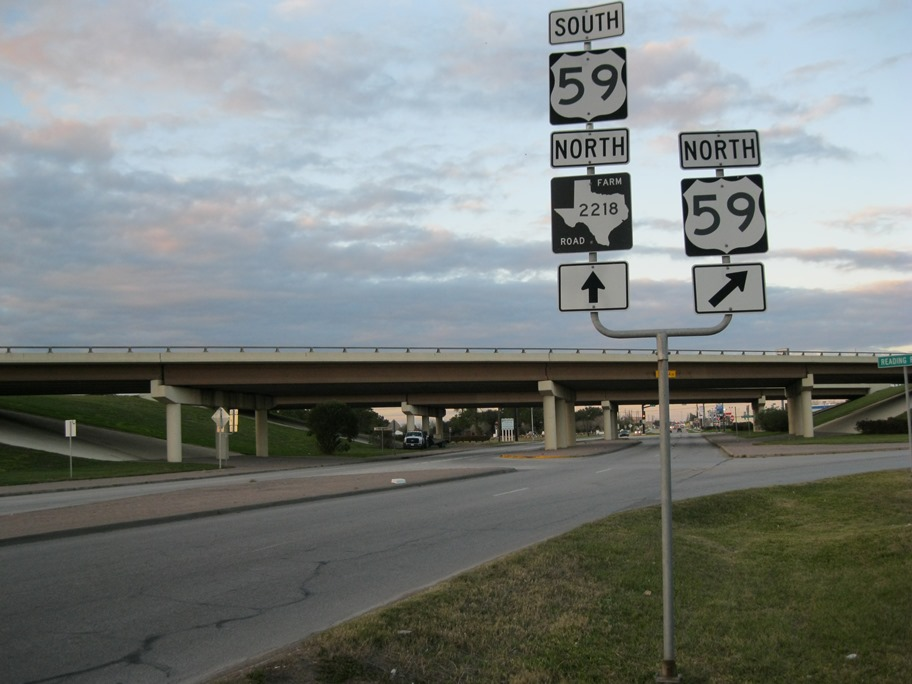
What is now the I-69/US 59 overpass on FM 2218 in Rosenberg

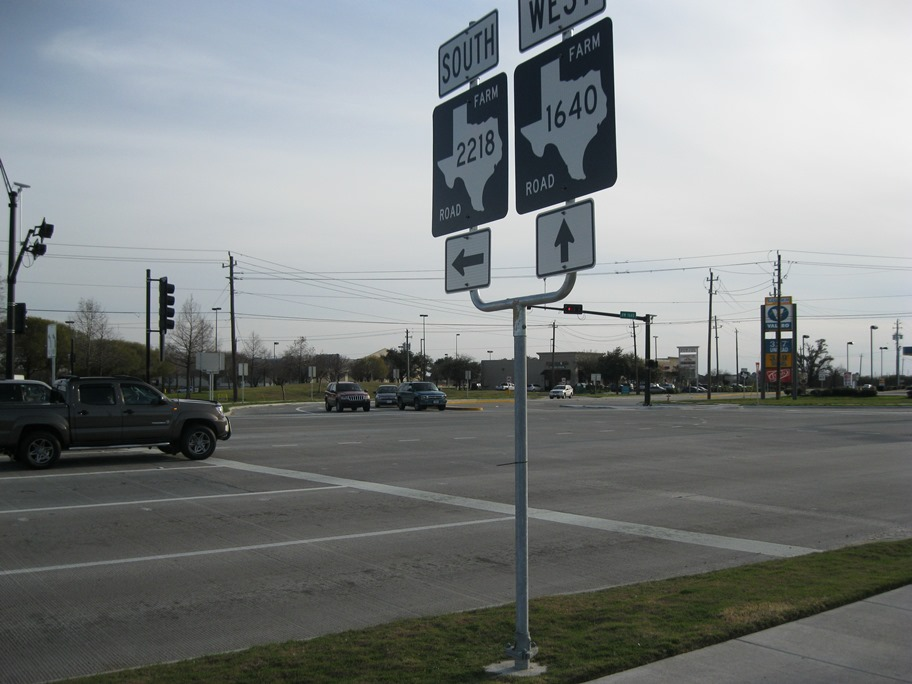
View southwest at FM 1640 and FM 2218 in Richmond

== FM 2219 ==
Farm to Market Road 2219
- Location: Randall County
- Length: 10.294 mi (16.567 km)
- Existed: 1954–present

== FM 2220 ==
Farm to Market Road 2220
- Location: Hidalgo County
- Length: 13.851 mi (22.291 km)
- Existed: April 20, 1954–present

Farm to Market Road 2220 (FM 2220) is located in Hidalgo County. It runs from FM 1925 to FM 1016.

FM 2220 was designated on April 20, 1954, from SH 107, 2.3 miles (3.7 km) west of SH 336, south 2 miles (3.2 km) to US 83 (now Bus. US 83), 2 miles (3.2 km) west of SH 336. On May 2, 1962, the road was extended north 2.5 miles (4.0 km) to FM 1925. On June 27, 1995, the entire route was redesignated Urban Road 2220 (UR 2220). On April 25, 1996, a section from US 83 and Spur 487 south to FM 1016 was added, creating a gap. This gap was closed on December 19, 1996, when the route was extended from Bus. US 83 to US 83, replacing Spur 487. The designation of the route reverted to FM 2220 with the elimination of the Urban Road system on November 15, 2018.

== FM 2221 ==
Farm to Market Road 2221
- Location: Hidalgo County
- Length: 14.646 mi (23.570 km)
- Existed: 1954–present

== RM 2222 ==
Ranch to Market Road 2222
- Location: Travis County
- Length: 10.844 mi (17.452 km)
- Existed: September 29, 1954–present

Ranch to Market Road 2222 (RM 2222) is located in Travis County.

=== FM 2222 ===
Farm to Market Road 2222
- Location: Houston County
- Existed: April 21, 1954–1954

Farm to Market Road 2222 (FM 2222) was located in Houston County. Designated in 1954, it ran from FM 230 to the Eastham State Prison Farm (now the J. Dale Wainwright Unit of the Texas Department of Criminal Justice). The route was cancelled later that year upon completion of construction.

== FM 2223 ==
Farm to Market Road 2223
- Location: Brazos County
- Length: 6.586 mi (10.599 km)
- Existed: October 26, 1954–present

Farm to Market Road 2223 (FM 2223) is located in Brazos County. It runs from FM 974, 3 miles (4.8 km) northeast of Bryan, northwestward to SH OSR, 4 miles (6.4 km) northeast of Benchley. It is known locally as Old Cameron Ranch Road.

The current FM 2223 was designated on its current route on October 26, 1954.

=== FM 2223 (May 1954) ===
Farm to Market Road 2223
- Location: Hood County
- Existed: May 21, 1954–October 25, 1954

A previous route numbered FM 2223 was designated on May 21, 1954, from FM 201 (now FM 56) southwest to the Paluxy River. FM 2223 was cancelled five months later and transferred to FM 204 (now FM 51).

== FM 2224 ==
Farm to Market Road 2224
- Location: Archer County
- Length: 5.142 mi (8.275 km)
- Existed: September 29, 1954–present

Farm to Market Road 2224 (FM 2224) is located in Archer County. It runs from SH 79 westward and northward 5.1 miles (8.2 km) to FM 1954 southeast of Holliday.

FM 2224 was established on September 29, 1954, along the current route.

== FM 2225 ==
Farm to Market Road 2225
- Location: Wood County
- Length: 8.858 mi (14.256 km)
- Existed: October 31, 1958–present

=== FM 2225 (1954) ===
Farm to Market Road 2225
- Location: Archer County
- Existed: September 29, 1954–July 18, 1958

A previous route numbered FM 2225 was designated on September 29, 1954, from SH 25 near Archer City to a point 5.9 miles (9.5 km) southeast. On November 21, 1956, the road was extended southeast 6.8 miles (10.9 km) to US 281. On February 28, 1957, the northern terminus was shifted east 1.5 miles (2.4 km), shortening the route by 0.7 miles (1.1 km). FM 2225 was cancelled on July 18, 1958, and removed from the highway system as the county could not acquire right-of-way for the route.

== FM 2226 ==
Farm to Market Road 2226
- Location: Wichita County
- Length: 1.192 mi (1.918 km)
- Existed: September 29, 1954–present

== FM 2227 ==
Farm to Market Road 2227
- Location: Ector County
- Existed: September 29, 1954–September 29, 1992

Farm to Market Road 2227 (FM 2227) was located in Ector County.

FM 2227 was designated on September 29, 1954, running from US 80 (now BL I-20) in Odessa southward to SH 51 (now US 385) at a distance of 3.7 miles (6.0 km). The highway was cancelled on September 29, 1992, with the mileage being transferred to FM 1882.

== FM 2228 ==
Farm to Market Road 2228
- Location: Callahan County
- Length: 13.864 mi (22.312 km)
- Existed: 1954–present

== FM 2229 ==
Farm to Market Road 2229
- Location: Haskell and Knox counties
- Length: 17.303 mi (27.846 km)
- Existed: 1954–present

Farm to Market Road 2229 (FM 2229) is located in Haskell and Knox counties. It runs from SH 6 in O'Brien eastward to FM 600 near Knox City. The route primarily serves local agricultural traffic and provides access between O'Brien and Knox City. FM 2229 was designated in 1954.

== FM 2230 ==
Farm to Market Road 2230
- Location: Howard County
- Length: 17.658 mi (28.418 km)
- Existed: 1954–present

== FM 2231 ==
Farm to Market Road 2231
- Location: Stephens County
- Length: 10.385 mi (16.713 km)
- Existed: 1954–present

== FM 2232 ==
Farm to Market Road 2232
- Location: Sherman County
- Length: 4.006 mi (6.447 km)
- Existed: September 21, 1955–present

Farm to Market Road 2232 (FM 2232) is located in Sherman County. It runs from SH 15 east of Stratford southward 4 miles (6.4 km) to CR Q. The roadway continues beyond both termini as CR 13.

FM 2232 was designated on September 21, 1955, along the current route. At the time, SH 15 at the northern terminus was designated FM 289.

=== FM 2232 (1954) ===
Farm to Market Road 2232
- Location: Stephens County
- Existed: September 29, 1954–November 3, 1954

A previous route numbered FM 2232 was designated in Stephens County on September 29, 1954, from FM 717, 10 miles (16 km) south of Caddo, east 7.0 miles (11.3 km) to the Palo Pinto County line. FM 2232 was cancelled on November 3 of that year and became a portion of FM 207.

== RM 2233 ==
Ranch to Market Road 2233
- Location: Llano County
- Length: 5.394 mi (8.681 km)
- Existed: June 1, 1965–present

=== FM 2233 (1954) ===
Farm to Market Road 2233
- Location: El Paso County
- Existed: September 29, 1954–December 19, 1959

The first route numbered FM 2233 was designated on September 29, 1954, running from Loop 16 (now US 62 / US 85) in El Paso, eastward and southeastward to FM 659 near Ysleta at a distance of 8.0 miles (12.9 km). The highway was extended 18.2 miles (29.3 km) southeastward to a road intersection near Fabens on November 29, 1955. FM 2233 was cancelled on December 19, 1959, becoming part of I-10.

=== FM 2233 (1961) ===
Farm to Market Road 2233
- Location: Johnson County
- Existed: September 20, 1961–May 21, 1964

The second route numbered FM 2233 was designated on September 20, 1961, running from SH 174 northwestward to the Tarrant County line at a distance of 2.2 miles (3.5 km). On May 6, 1964, the road was extended north to FM 1187. The highway was cancelled fifteen days later, with the mileage being transferred to FM 731.

== FM 2234 ==
Farm to Market Road 2234
- Location: Brazoria and Fort Bend counties
- Length: 11.597 mi (18.664 km)
- Existed: September 29, 1954–present

Farm to Market Road 2234 (FM 2234) is an urban and suburban route between Missouri City and Pearland, south-southwest of Houston. Beginning at US 90 Alt., the road follows a southerly path through neighborhoods of Missouri City, in Fort Bend County, passing briefly through Stafford. After making an east curve, FM 2234 passes briefly through Houston and then crosses under the Fort Bend Parkway. It then travels into more undeveloped areas, for a distance following a south boundary of Houston. After intersecting with FM 521, FM 2234 enters Brazoria County and ends at SH 288 in the Shadow Creek Ranch area of Pearland. The highway is signed north–south until it reaches the FM 521 intersection, from which it is signed as an east–west highway.

FM 2234 was designated on September 29, 1954, from US 59 (now US 90 Alt.) to the Blue Ridge State Prison Farm (current junction with Blue Ridge Road). On September 21, 1955, it was extended east to FM 521. On April 30, 1987, it was extended east to SH 288. Effective June 27, 1995, FM 2234 was redesignated as Urban Road 2234 (UR 2234). The designation reverted to FM 2234 with the elimination of the Urban Road system on November 15, 2018.

The portion within Missouri City is also known as Texas Parkway. The portion from the Missouri City line to FM 521 is also known as McHard Road. The portion from FM 521 to SH 288 is also known as Shadow Creek Parkway.

Junction list

County	Location	mi	km	Destinations	Notes
Fort Bend	Missouri City	0.0	0.0	South Gessner Road	Continuation west of US 90 Alt.
Fort Bend	Missouri City	0.0	0.0	US 90 Alt.	Interchange
Fort Bend	Missouri City	2.7	4.3	FM 3345 west (Cartwright Road)	
Fort Bend	Houston	4.0	6.4	Fort Bend Parkway Toll Road	Interchange
Fort Bend	Pearland	8.5	13.7	FM 521	
Brazoria	Pearland	11.6	18.7	SH 288 – Houston, Angleton, Lake Jackson, Freeport	Interchange
Brazoria	Pearland	11.6	18.7	McHard Road	Continuation east of SH 288
1.000 mi = 1.609 km; 1.000 km = 0.621 mi

== FM 2235 ==
Farm to Market Road 2235
- Location: Calhoun County
- Length: 7.39 mi (11.89 km)
- Existed: 1954–present

== FM 2236 ==
Farm to Market Road 2236
- Location: Crosby County
- Length: 4.897 mi (7.881 km)
- Existed: September 21, 1955–present

Farm to Market Road 2236 (FM 2236) is located in Crosby County.

FM 2236 was designated on September 21, 1955, on its current route.

=== FM 2236 (1954) ===
Farm to Market Road 2236
- Location: De Witt County
- Existed: September 29, 1954–December 3, 1954

A previous route numbered FM 2236 was designated on September 29, 1954, from FM 240 east 5.4 miles (8.7 km) to US 87 some 9 miles (14 km) northwest of Cuero. This was cancelled on December 3, 1954 in exchange for extending FM 953. The route was restored as FM 2542 in 1958.

== FM 2237 ==
Farm to Market Road 2237
- Location: Fayette County
- Length: 13.764 mi (22.151 km)
- Existed: 1954–present

== FM 2238 ==
Farm to Market Road 2238
- Location: Fayette County
- Length: 7.245 mi (11.660 km)
- Existed: 1954–present

== FM 2239 ==
Farm to Market Road 2239
- Location: Lee and Bastrop counties
- Length: 6.681 mi (10.752 km)
- Existed: 1954–present

== FM 2240 ==
Farm to Market Road 2240
- Location: Bowie County
- Length: 1.606 mi (2.585 km)
- Existed: June 22, 1964–present

Farm to Market Road 2240 (FM 2240) is located in Bowie County in the city of Texarkana. The highway is known locally as Moores Lane.

FM 2240 begins at an intersection with FM 559. The highway travels in an eastern direction through a suburban area, passing Pleasant Grove Middle School and the First Baptist Church, ending at an intersection with FM 1397. FM 2240 is three lanes for its entire length: one eastbound lane, one westbound, and a center turn-lane.

The current FM 2240 was designated on June 22, 1964, from FM 559 to FM 1397. On June 27, 1995, the route was redesignated Urban Road 2240 (UR 2240). The designation reverted to FM 2240 with the elimination of the Urban Road system on November 15, 2018.

=== FM 2240 (1954) ===
Farm to Market Road 2240
- Location: Caldwell County
- Existed: September 29, 1954–May 15, 1964

A previous route numbered FM 2240 was designated on September 29, 1954, running from FM 20 near Lockhart, southeastward to FM 86 near Brownsboro at a distance of 9.7 miles (15.6 km). This highway was cancelled on May 15, 1964, with the mileage being transferred to FM 1322.

== RM 2241 ==
Ranch to Market Road 2241
- Location: Llano County
- Length: 16.417 mi (26.421 km)
- Existed: 1954–present

== RM 2242 ==
Ranch to Market Road 2242
- Location: Mason County
- Length: 1.449 mi (2.332 km)
- Existed: 1954–present

== RM 2243 ==
Ranch to Market Road 2243
- Location: Williamson County
- Length: 11.286 mi (18.163 km)
- Existed: September 29, 1954 (Note: RM 2243 was originally designated as FM 2243 from 1954 to 1966.)–present

Ranch to Market Road 2243 (RM 2243) is located in Williamson County. It is approximately 11.3 miles (18.2 km) long.

RM 2243 begins in Leander, at an intersection with US 183. It travels to the east along South Street, crossing the current 183A Toll Road along its current non-controlled-access northern stub. RM 2243 then crosses the Ronald Reagan Boulevard arterial, which provides access to FM 734 and RM 1431 in Cedar Park to the south and to SH 29 to the north. Farther east, the route enters Georgetown, where it is known as Leander Drive, and has a junction with I-35 at its exit 260. The RM 2243 designation ends at South Austin Avenue (the former I-35 Business, now designated Spur 26). The roadway continues as FM 1460.

RM 2243 was first designated on September 29, 1954, as Farm to Market Road 2243 (FM 2243), connecting US 183 in Leander to US 81 (later replaced by I-35 Business) in Georgetown. The designation was changed to RM 2243 on October 1, 1956. On May 5, 1966, a westward extension of about 4.4 mi (7.1 km), from US 183 to Travis County, was added. The segment west of US 183 was removed from the state highway system and returned to the city of Leander's jurisdiction on April 24, 2003.

Junction list

The entire route is in Williamson County.

Location	mi	km	Destinations	Notes
Leander	0.0	0.0	US 183 – Austin, Lampasas	Western terminus; road continues as South Street
Leander	1.0	1.6	183A Toll Road	
Leander	2.8	4.5	Ronald Reagan Boulevard	
Georgetown	10.6	17.1	I-35 – Austin, Waco	I-35 exit 260
Georgetown	11.3	18.2	Spur 26 (Austin Avenue) / FM 1460	Eastern terminus; road continues as FM 1460
1.000 mi = 1.609 km; 1.000 km = 0.621 mi

== RM 2244 ==
Ranch to Market Road 2244
- Location: Travis County
- Length: 11.26 mi (18.12 km)
- Existed: 1954–present

Ranch to Market Road 2244 (RM 2244) is located in Travis County.

== FM 2245 ==
Farm to Market Road 2245
- Location: Jasper County
- Length: 3.655 mi (5.882 km)
- Existed: 1954–present

== FM 2246 ==
Farm to Market Road 2246
- Location: Jasper County
- Length: 9.241 mi (14.872 km)
- Existed: 1954–present

== FM 2247 ==
Farm to Market Road 2247
- Location: Comanche County
- Length: 15.061 mi (24.238 km)
- Existed: 1954–present

Farm to Market Road 2247 (FM 2247) is located in Comanche County.

The southern terminus of FM 2247 is at SH 16 in Comanche. It runs west along Wright Avenue for approximately 0.46 miles (0.74 km) before turning to the north; from this point, FM Spur 2247 continues to the west for approximately 0.38 miles (0.61 km) to an intersection with SH 36. North of Comanche, FM 2247 intersects FM 588. The route's northern terminus is at an intersection with FM 587 west of De Leon.

FM 2247 was designated on September 29, 1954, from Comanche to a junction with FM 588 12.0 miles (19.3 km) to the north. On April 23, 1958, FM 588 was truncated, with the segment from this junction north to FM 587 being transferred to FM 2247. The spur connection was designated on May 24, 1963.

== RM 2248 ==
Ranch to Market Road 2248
- Location: Lipscomb County
- Length: 3.574 mi (5.752 km)
- Existed: October 31, 1958–present

=== FM 2248 ===
Farm to Market Road 2248
- Location: Mills County
- Existed: September 29, 1954–September 2, 1955

A previous route numbered FM 2248 was designated on September 29, 1954, running from FM 575 northeastward to a road intersection at a distance of 5.1 miles (8.2 km). On July 28, 1955, the road was extended northeast 4.8 miles (7.7 km) to the Hamilton County line. The highway was cancelled on September 2, 1955, with the mileage being transferred to FM 2005.

== FM 2249 ==
Farm to Market Road 2249
- Location: Hudspeth County
- Length: 5.121 mi (8.241 km)
- Existed: September 29, 1954–present

Farm to Market Road 2249 (FM 2249) is located in Hudspeth County. Its western terminus is at a county road 2 miles (3.2 km) west of Dell City. It runs eastward through the city, intersecting FM 1437, before ending at FM 1576.

FM 2249 was designated on September 29, 1954, from Dell City, 4 miles (6.4 km) eastward and 2 miles (3.2 km) northward. On December 17 of that year, its routing was changed so that it went 3.0 miles (4.8 km) eastward and 3.0 miles (4.8 km) northward. On July 28, 1955, FM 2249 was extended west 2.0 miles (3.2 km). On September 18, 1957, the south–north portion was transferred to FM 1576.

== FM 2250 ==
Farm to Market Road 2250
- Location: Armstrong County
- Length: 5.173 mi (8.325 km)
- Existed: 1954–present

== FM 2251 ==
Farm to Market Road 2251
- Location: Angelina County
- Length: 5.431 mi (8.740 km)
- Existed: 1954–present

== FM 2252 ==
Farm to Market Road 2252
- Location: Bexar and Comal counties
- Length: 14.254 mi (22.940 km)
- Existed: 1954–present

Farm to Market Road 2252 (FM 2252) is located in Greater San Antonio. It is approximately 14.3 miles (23.0 km) long.

FM 2252 begins at a junction with Interstate 410 in San Antonio, and travels north along Perrin-Beitel Road. It crosses the controlled-access portion of Wurzbach Parkway, and turns to the northeast, where the route becomes Nacogdoches Road. FM 2252 intersects Loop 1604 before entering Comal County and the community of Bracken. The route continues to the northeast, intersecting FM 3009 in Garden Ridge, before making a dogleg turn to the southeast at the intersection with Old Nacogdoches Road. Here, FM 2252 changes cardinal directions, from south–north to west–east. FM 2252 ends at an intersection with FM 482, which provides access to Interstate 35 in Schertz.

FM 2252 was designated on October 13, 1954, with a northern terminus at the Comal County line. It was extended to its current length on September 5, 1973, through Comal County to and along FM 1337 which started at Bracken, with a spur route into Bracken. The spur route was removed on March 31, 1976. On June 27, 1995, the portion between I-410 and FM 3009 was officially changed to Urban Road 2252 (UR 2252); the designation reverted to FM 2252 with the elimination of the Urban Road system on November 15, 2018. The section of FM 2252 south of Loop 1604 was proposed for decommissioning in 2014 as part of TxDOT's San Antonio turnback proposal, which would have turned back over 129 miles of roads to the city of San Antonio, but the city of San Antonio rejected that proposal.

Junction list

County	Location	mi	km	Destinations	Notes
Bexar	San Antonio	0.0	0.0	I-410 (Connally Loop)	Southern terminus; I-410 exit 25 eastbound, 25B westbound; continues as Perrin-Beitel Road
Bexar	San Antonio	1.4	2.3	Wurzbach Parkway (PA 1502)	
Bexar	San Antonio	6.9	11.1	Loop 1604 (Anderson Loop)	
Cibolo Creek		8.7	14.0	Bridge	
Comal	Garden Ridge	11.4	18.3	FM 3009	
Comal	Schertz	14.3	23.0	FM 482 – Comal	Eastern terminus; road continues as FM 482 east
1.000 mi = 1.609 km; 1.000 km = 0.621 mi

== FM 2253 ==
Farm to Market Road 2253
- Location: Bowie County
- Length: 6.328 mi (10.184 km)
- Existed: October 13, 1954–present

Farm to Market Road 2253 (FM 2253) is located in Bowie County.

FM 2253 begins at an intersection with US 82 in eastern Leary. The highway travels in a generally northern direction, intersecting I-30 and FM 2148 before leaving the town. North of Leary, FM 2253 travels through rural areas with playa lakes and farms, ending at an intersection with FM 559 northeast of Wamba.

FM 2253 was designated on October 13, 1954, traveling from FM 2148 northward to FM 559 at a distance of 4.8 miles (7.7 km). On May 26, 1966, the highway was extended 1.7 miles (2.7 km) southward to US 82 over part of FM 2148.

Junction list

The entire route is in Bowie County.

Location	mi	km	Destinations	Notes
Leary	0.0	0.0	US 82 – New Boston, Texarkana	
Leary	0.3	0.48	I-30 – Dallas, Texarkana	I-30 exit 213
Leary	1.7	2.7	FM 2148 south – Red Lick	
	6.3	10.1	FM 559 – Texarkana	
1.000 mi = 1.609 km; 1.000 km = 0.621 mi

== FM 2254 ==
Farm to Market Road 2254
- Location: Camp County
- Length: 6.362 mi (10.239 km)
- Existed: 1954–present

== FM 2255 ==
Farm to Market Road 2255
- Location: Lubbock County
- Length: 8.696 mi (13.995 km)
- Existed: 1955–present

Farm to Market Road 2255 (FM 2255) is located in Lubbock.

FM 2255 begins at an intersection with Spur 309 in Lubbock near Reese Center. The highway runs east, meeting FM 179 (Inler Avenue) at a stop sign-controlled intersection. Between Inler Avenue and Milwaukee Avenue, FM 2255 runs in a rural area of northern Lubbock. East of Milwaukee Avenue, the highway sees much more development along its route, including commercial developments and numerous subdivisions. From Quaker Avenue to US 82 (Marsha Sharp Freeway), FM 2255 runs through the northern half of Texas Tech University and passes by University Medical Center. The highway ends at an interchange with the Marsha Sharp Freeway.

The entire highway is known locally in Lubbock as 4th Street.

FM 2255 was designated on September 21, 1955, from War Highway 5 (now Spur 309) east to west Lubbock City Limits. On March 29, 1956, FM 2255 was extended east to US 82. On June 27, 1995, FM 2255 changed to Urban Road 2255 (UR 2255). The designation reverted to FM 2255 with the elimination of the Urban Road system on November 15, 2018.

Junction list

The entire route is in Lubbock, Lubbock County.

mi	km	Destinations	Notes
0.0	0.0	Spur 309 south / Research Boulevard – Reese Center	
1.0	1.6	FM 179 (Inler Avenue) – Shallowater, Wolfforth	
4.9	7.9	FM 2528 (Frankford Avenue)	
5.5	8.9	Loop 289 (West Loop)	Interchange
8.7	14.0	US 82 east (Marsha Sharp Freeway) / University Avenue	Interchange; eastbound exit and westbound entrance
1.000 mi = 1.609 km; 1.000 km = 0.621 mi: Incomplete access

=== FM 2255 (1954) ===
Farm to Market Road 2255
- Location: Ellis
- Existed: October 26, 1954–1955

A previous route numbered FM 2255 was designated on October 26, 1954, from FM 66 in Maypearl, northward 8.1 miles (13.0 km). The road was cancelled by 1955.

== FM 2256 ==
Farm to Market Road 2256
- Location: Palo Pinto County
- Length: 5.109 mi (8.222 km)
- Existed: September 20, 1961–present

=== FM 2256 (1954) ===
Farm to Market Road 2256
- Location: Harrison and Marion counties
- Existed: October 13, 1954–December 31, 1959

A previous route numbered FM 2256 was designated on October 13, 1954, from SH 154 southeast of Harleton northeast 13.2 miles (21.2 km) to US 59 south of Jefferson. On May 25, 1955, the road was extended northeast 1.1 miles (1.8 km) over former US 59 to FM 134 near Jefferson. On January 29, 1959, the road was extended southwest 1.5 miles (2.4 km) to FM 450. FM 2256 was cancelled on December 31, 1959, and transferred to FM 2208.

== FM 2257 ==
Farm to Market Road 2257
- Location: Parker and Tarrant counties
- Length: 7.579 mi (12.197 km)
- Existed: September 20, 1961–present

Farm to Market Road 2257 (FM 2257) is located in Parker and Tarrant counties.

FM 2257 begins at an intersection with SH 199 between Springtown and Azle. The highway travels in a mostly northern direction along Jay Bird Lane before turning east onto Knob Hill Road at an intersection with Knob Road. FM 2257 continues to travel east along Knob Hill Road before ending at an intersection with FM 730 in Briar.

The current FM 2257 was designated in 1961, running from FM 730 westward to a road intersection at length of 4.1 miles (6.6 km). In 1965, the highway was extended 3.7 miles (6.0 km) southward to SH 199.

=== FM 2257 (1954) ===
Farm to Market Road 2257
- Location: San Jacinto County
- Existed: October 13, 1954–November 28, 1958

A previous route numbered FM 2257 was designated on October 13, 1954, from SH 150 at Waverly southeast 4.2 miles (6.8 km) to a road intersection. FM 2257 was cancelled on November 28, 1958, and transferred to FM 1725.

== FM 2258 ==
Farm to Market Road 2258
- Location: Johnson and Ellis counties
- Length: 9.351 mi (15.049 km)
- Existed: 1954–present

== FM 2259 ==
Farm to Market Road 2259
- Location: Nacogdoches County
- Length: 9.723 mi (15.648 km)
- Existed: October 13, 1954–present

Farm to Market Road 2259 (FM 2259) is a 9.7-mile (15.6 km) route in Nacogdoches County. It connects FM 226 in Woden with Bus. SH 7 / Bus. SH 21 (East Main Street) in Nacogdoches.

When it was established October 13, 1954, it ran from FM 1275 in Nacogdoches to Hampton Switch, a distance of about 6 miles (9.7 km). On November 21, 1956, it was extended east about 3.4 miles (5.5 km) to FM 226. On December 19, 1978, FM 1275 was realigned in Nacogdoches and the northern terminus was moved to SH 7 / SH 21. On October 25, 2018 SH 7 and SH 21 were both rerouted to run along Loop 224 on the southern edge of Nacogdoches, leaving their former routings as business loops.

== FM 2260 ==
Farm to Market Road 2260
- Location: Panola County
- Length: 1.71 mi (2.75 km)
- Existed: 1954–present

== FM 2261 ==
Farm to Market Road 2261
- Location: Shelby County
- Length: 9.013 mi (14.505 km)
- Existed: 1954–present

== FM 2262 ==
Farm to Market Road 2262
- Location: Trinity County
- Length: 20.75 mi (33.39 km)
- Existed: 1954–present

== FM 2263 ==
Farm to Market Road 2263
- Location: Upshur County
- Length: 6.225 mi (10.018 km)
- Existed: 1954–present

== FM 2264 ==
Farm to Market Road 2264
- Location: Wise County
- Length: 13.347 mi (21.480 km)
- Existed: 1954–present

== FM 2265 ==
Farm to Market Road 2265
- Location: Wise County
- Length: 8.928 mi (14.368 km)
- Existed: September 20, 1961–present

FM 2265 was designated on September 20, 1961, from SH 114 east to FM 1655. On June 1, 1965, FM 2265 was extended west to FM 2127.

=== FM 2265 (1954) ===
Farm to Market Road 2265
- Location: Hill County
- Existed: October 26, 1954–January 24, 1955

The first use of FM 2265 was designated on October 26, 1954, from FM 66 at Itasca southeast 14.0 miles (22.5 km) to US 77 some 10 miles (16 km) northeast of Hillsboro. This was cancelled and removed from the designated highway system on January 24, 1955, in exchange for extending FM 309, FM 934, and FM 1242.

=== FM 2265 (1955) ===
Farm to Market Road 2265
- Location: Floyd County
- Existed: September 21, 1955–March 24, 1958

The second use of FM 2265 was designated on September 21, 1955, from US 70, 2.3 miles (3.7 km) west of the Floyd–Motley county line, northward 5.3 miles (8.5 km) to a road intersection. FM 2265 was cancelled on March 24, 1958, and mileage was transferred to FM 28.

=== FM 2265 (1958) ===
Farm to Market Road 2265
- Location: Palo Pinto County
- Existed: October 31, 1958–December 15, 1959

The third use of FM 2265 was designated on October 31, 1958, from FM 4 northeastward 4.2 miles (6.8 km) to west of Brazos. This was cancelled on December 15, 1959, and mileage was transferred to FM 129.

== FM 2266 ==
Farm to Market Road 2266
- Location: Hemphill County
- Length: 10.76 mi (17.32 km)
- Existed: 1954–present

== FM 2267 ==
Farm to Market Road 2267
- Location: Anderson County
- Length: 5.32 mi (8.56 km)
- Existed: 1954–present

== FM 2268 ==
Farm to Market Road 2268
- Location: Bell and Milam counties
- Length: 20.102 mi (32.351 km)
- Existed: 1954–present

== FM 2269 ==
Farm to Market Road 2269
- Location: Milam County
- Length: 9.996 mi (16.087 km)
- Existed: 1954–present

== FM 2270 ==
Farm to Market Road 2270
- Location: Palo Pinto County
- Length: 0.518 mi (834 m)
- Existed: September 20, 1961–present

=== FM 2270 (1954) ===
Farm to Market Road 2270
- Location: Bell and Milam counties
- Existed: October 26, 1954–December 31, 1959

A previous route numbered FM 2270 was designated on October 25, 1954, from SH 95, south of Holland, east 7.3 miles (11.7 km) to Vilas. On July 28, 1955, the road was extended east 1.4 miles (2.3 km) to the Milam County line, and another 1.2 miles (1.9 km) east to FM 437 four weeks later. FM 2270 was cancelled on December 31, 1959, and transferred to FM 2268.

== FM 2271 ==
Farm to Market Road 2271
- Location: Bell County
- Length: 2.001 mi (3.220 km)
- Existed: 1954–present

== FM 2272 ==
Farm to Market Road 2272
- Location: Armstrong County
- Length: 6.077 mi (9.780 km)
- Existed: 1954–present

== FM 2273 ==
Farm to Market Road 2273
- Location: Brown County
- Length: 7.898 mi (12.711 km)
- Existed: 1954–present

Farm to Market Road 2273 (FM 2273) is located in Brown County. The road begins at US 183 south of May, and continues west until it reaches FM 2559 northeast of Grosvenor, where it subsequently changes numbers.

FM 2273 was designated on October 26, 1954, along its current route.

== FM 2274 ==
Farm to Market Road 2274
- Location: Cherokee County
- Length: 12.241 mi (Note: The certified length given is shorter than the actual mileage, as the Texas Department of Transportation description of FM 2274 considers it to be discontinuous at rather than concurrent with US 79.) (19.700 km)
- Existed: 1954–present

Farm to Market Road 2274 (FM 2274) is located in east-northeast Cherokee County. It is approximately 12.2 miles (19.6 km) in length. It runs from SH 204 in Ponta to FM 856 south of Concord.

FM 2274 was designated on October 26, 1954, running 8.3 miles (13.4 km) between SH 204 at Ponta and US 79. On May 6, 1964, the route was extended 4.1 miles (6.6 km) northward to US 79 and to FM 856 near Concord.

Junction list

The entire route is in Cherokee County.

Location	mi	km	Destinations	Notes
Ponta	0.0	0.0	SH 204 – Nacogdoches, Jacksonville	Southern terminus
	4.1	6.6	FM 235 east – Reklaw	South end of FM 235 overlap
	4.5	7.2	FM 235 west – New Summerfield	North end of FM 235 overlap
	6.7	10.8	FM 3288 – Lake Striker	
	8.4	13.5	US 79 north – Henderson	South end of US 79 overlap
	8.8	14.2	US 79 south – New Summerfield, Jacksonville	North end of US 79 overlap
	12.9	20.8	FM 856 – Concord	Northern terminus
1.000 mi = 1.609 km; 1.000 km = 0.621 mi: Concurrency terminus

== FM 2275 ==
Farm to Market Road 2275
- Location: Gregg County
- Length: 8.186 mi (13.174 km)
- Existed: 1954–present

Farm to Market Road 2275 (FM 2275) runs from US 271 in Gladewater east to US 259 in Longview. It is known as Vesta Avenue in Gladewater, and as George Richey Road elsewhere along its route.

FM 2275 was designated on October 26, 1954, from US 271 east to FM 1403 (now SH 300). On June 27, 1995, the entire route was redesignated Urban Road 2275 (UR 2275); the designation of the route reverted to FM 2275 with the elimination of the Urban Road system on November 15, 2018.

In February 2011, TxDOT announced plants to extend the route by 4.4 miles (7.1 km) to US 259.

Junction list

The entire route is in Gregg County.

Location	mi	km	Destinations	Notes
Gladewater	0.0	0.0	US 271 (Main Street) – Gilmer, Tyler	
White Oak	4.5	7.2	FM 3272 south (White Oak Road)	
Longview	6.3	10.1	FM 1845 (Pine Tree Road)	
Longview	8.2	13.2	SH 300 (Gilmer Road) – Gilmer	
Longview	10.0	16.1	FM 1343	
	11.3	18.2	Spur 502 (Judson Road) – Judson, Longview	
	12.4	20.0	US 259 – Daingerfield, Longview	
1.000 mi = 1.609 km; 1.000 km = 0.621 mi

== FM 2276 ==
Farm to Market Road 2276
- Location: Gregg and Rusk counties
- Length: 18.223 mi (29.327 km)
- Existed: 1954–present

Farm to Market Road 2276 (FM 2276) runs from SH 323 near Henderson north to FM 2087 near Kilgore.

FM 2276 was designated on October 26, 1954, from FM 2087 to SH 322. On March 29, 1957, FM 2276 was rerouted to end at US 259. On May 6, 1964, FM 2276 was extended to SH 323.

Junction list

County	Location	mi	km	Destinations	Notes
Rusk		0.0	0.0	SH 323 – Henderson, New London	
Rusk		0.6	0.97	Loop 571	
Rusk		2.8	4.5	US 259 – Kilgore, Henderson	
Rusk		7.7	12.4	FM 850	
Rusk		12.5	20.1	FM 1249 – Kilgore, Monroe	
Gregg		15.6	25.1	FM 2204 – Kilgore, East Texas Regional Airport	
Gregg		17.0	27.4	FM 349 – Kilgore, Lakeport	
Gregg		18.2	29.3	FM 2087 – Kilgore, Longview	
1.000 mi = 1.609 km; 1.000 km = 0.621 mi

== RM 2277 ==
Ranch to Market Road 2277
- Location: Hutchinson County
- Length: 7.586 mi (12.208 km)
- Existed: October 26, 1954 (Note: RM 2277 was originally designated as FM 2277 from 1954 to 1955.)–present

Originally this was Farm to Market Road 2277 (FM 2277).

== FM 2278 ==
Farm to Market Road 2278
- Location: Cottle County
- Length: 8.776 mi (14.124 km)
- Existed: 1954–present

== FM 2279 ==
Farm to Market Road 2279
- Location: Knox and Haskell counties
- Length: 15.467 mi (24.892 km)
- Existed: 1954–present

== FM 2280 ==
Farm to Market Road 2280
- Location: Johnson County
- Length: 5.813 mi (9.355 km)
- Existed: October 31, 1958–present

=== FM 2280 (1954) ===
Farm to Market Road 2280
- Location: Coryell County
- Existed: October 26, 1954–March 21, 1958

A previous route numbered FM 2280 was designated on October 26, 1954, from SH 36 at Jonesboro east 9.8 miles (15.8 km) to FM 182 at Turnersville. FM 2280 was cancelled on March 21, 1958, and transferred to FM 217, although this did not take effect until the 1959 Travel Map was released.

== FM 2281 ==
Farm to Market Road 2281
- Location: Denton County
- Length: 2.153 mi (3.465 km)
- Existed: 1954–present

Farm to Market Road 2281 (FM 2281) is located in southeastern Denton County. The highway begins at Hebron Parkway in Carrollton and runs north to the Sam Rayburn Tollway in Lewisville. It is known locally as Old Denton Road.

FM 2281 was designated on October 26, 1954, from FM 544 south to the Denton–Dallas county line. On July 28, 1994, FM 2281 was extended north to SH 121. On June 27, 1995, the entire route was redesignated Urban Road 2281 (UR 2281). On November 16, 2000, the section south of Hebron Parkway was given to the city of Carrollton. The designation of the extant section reverted to FM 2281 with the elimination of the Urban Road system on November 15, 2018.

Junction list

The entire route is in Denton County.

Location	mi	km	Destinations	Notes
Carrollton	0.0	0.0	Hebron Parkway	Continues south as Old Denton Road
Lewisville	1.8	2.9	FM 544 (Parker Road)	
Lewisville	2.2	3.5	Sam Rayburn Tollway / SH 121	
1.000 mi = 1.609 km; 1.000 km = 0.621 mi

== FM 2282 ==
Farm to Market Road 2282
- Location: Lynn and Garza counties
- Length: 7.172 mi (11.542 km)
- Existed: 1954–present

== FM 2283 ==
Farm to Market Road 2283
- Location: Red River County
- Length: 2.163 mi (3.481 km)
- Existed: 1954–present

== FM 2284 ==
Farm to Market Road 2284
- Location: Hale County
- Length: 8.101 mi (13.037 km)
- Existed: 1954–present

== FM 2285 ==
Farm to Market Road 2285
- Location: Hopkins County
- Length: 9.925 mi (15.973 km)
- Existed: 1954–present

== FM 2286 ==
Farm to Market Road 2286
- Location: Hale and Floyd counties
- Length: 26.345 mi (42.398 km)
- Existed: 1954–present

== FM 2287 ==
Farm to Market Road 2287
- Location: Callahan County
- Length: 14.769 mi (23.768 km)
- Existed: June 2, 1967–present

=== FM 2287 (1954) ===
Farm to Market Road 2287
- Location: Jim Wells and Live Oak counties
- Existed: October 26, 1954–May 18, 1966

A previous route numbered FM 2287 was designated on October 26, 1954, from US 59, 3.3 miles (5.3 km) northeast of Orange Grove, northwest 6.3 miles (10.1 km) to the Live Oak County line. On September 21, 1955, the road was extended north 4.5 miles (7.2 km) to Lagarto. FM 2287 was cancelled on May 18, 1966, and became a portion of FM 534, although this section was not signed as FM 534 until 1967.

== FM 2288 ==
Farm to Market Road 2288
- Location: Tom Green County
- Length: 11.411 mi (18.364 km)
- Existed: 1954–present

Farm to Market Road 2288 (FM 2288) is located in Tom Green County.

FM 2288 begins at an intersection with US 67 in western San Angelo near a major retail center. The highway travels in a north/northwest direction near a large subdivision then leaves the city near an intersection with RM 853. After leaving San Angelo, FM 2288 curves and bends around San Angelo State Park and the southern and western shores of O.C. Fisher Reservoir. The highway crosses over the North Concho River and enters the town of Grape Creek, ending at a junction with US 87.

FM 2288 was designated on October 26, 1954, traveling from US 87 southward to FM 853 at a distance of 10.2 miles (16.4 km). The highway was extended 1.5 miles (2.4 km) south of FM 853 to US 67 on October 31, 1957. The section of FM 2288 between US 67 and RM 853 was redesignated Urban Road 2288 (UR 2288) on June 27, 1995. The designation reverted to FM 2288 with the elimination of the Urban Road system on November 15, 2018.

Junction list

The entire route is in Tom Green County.

Location	mi	km	Destinations	Notes
San Angelo	0.0	0.0	US 67 (Sherwood Way) / Southland Boulevard – Mertzon, San Angelo	
San Angelo	1.6	2.6	RM 853 (Arden Road) – Arden, San Angelo	
Grape Creek	11.4	18.3	US 87 / Grape Creek Road – Sterling City, San Angelo	Interchange
1.000 mi = 1.609 km; 1.000 km = 0.621 mi

== FM 2289 ==
Farm to Market Road 2289
- Location: Madison County
- Length: 10.446 mi (16.811 km)
- Existed: 1954–present

== FM 2290 ==
Farm to Market Road 2290
- Location: Parmer County
- Length: 8.882 mi (14.294 km)
- Existed: 1954–present

== RM 2291 ==
Ranch to Market Road 2291
- Location: Menard and Kimble counties
- Length: 30.949 mi (49.808 km)
- Existed: October 26, 1954 (Note: RM 2291 was originally designated as FM 2291 from 1954 to 1957.)–present

Originally this was Farm to Market Road 2291 (FM 2291).

== FM 2292 ==
Farm to Market Road 2292
- Location: Nueces County
- Length: 7.592 mi (12.218 km)
- Existed: October 26, 1954–present

== FM 2293 ==
Farm to Market Road 2293
- Location: Robertson County
- Length: 11.788 mi (18.971 km)
- Existed: October 26, 1954–present

== FM 2294 ==
Farm to Market Road 2294
- Location: Starr County
- Length: 16.668 mi (26.825 km)
- Existed: October 26, 1954–present

== FM 2295 ==
Farm to Market Road 2295
- Location: Duval and Jim Wells counties
- Length: 34.485 mi (55.498 km)
- Existed: October 26, 1954–present

== FM 2296 ==
Farm to Market Road 2296
- Location: Walker County
- Length: 7.398 mi (11.906 km)
- Existed: October 26, 1954–present

== FM 2297 ==
Farm to Market Road 2297
- Location: Hopkins County
- Length: 7.78 mi (12.52 km)
- Existed: November 21, 1956–present

=== FM 2297 (1954) ===
Farm to Market Road 2297
- Location: Moore County
- Existed: October 26, 1954–May 23, 1956

A previous route numbered FM 2297 was designated in Moore County on October 26, 1954, from FM 119 southwest of Sunray to a point 2.6 miles (4.2 km) northwest. FM 2297 was cancelled on May 23, 1956, because the county could not acquire right-of-way for the route.

== FM 2298 ==
Farm to Market Road 2298
- Location: Deaf Smith and Parmer counties
- Length: 8.017 mi (12.902 km)
- Existed: September 20, 1961–present

=== FM 2298 (1954) ===
Farm to Market Road 2298
- Location: Moore County
- Existed: October 26, 1954–May 23, 1956

The first use of the FM 2298 designation was in Moore County, from SH 152 near the Hutchinson–Moore county line to a point 2.9 miles (4.7 km) south. FM 2298 was cancelled on May 23, 1956, and removed from the highway system because the county could not acquire right-of-way for the route.

=== FM 2298 (1956) ===
Farm to Market Road 2298
- Location: Hunt County
- Existed: November 21, 1956–March 5, 1959

The next use of the FM 2298 designation was in Hunt County, from FM 1570 near Majors Field north 2.6 miles (4.2 km) to US 69. FM 2298 was cancelled on March 5, 1959, and transferred to FM 1570.

== FM 2299 ==
Farm to Market Road 2299
- Location: Wheeler County
- Length: 4.159 mi (6.693 km)
- Existed: September 27, 1960–present

=== FM 2299 (1954) ===
Farm to Market Road 2299
- Location: Moore County
- Existed: October 26, 1954–May 23, 1956

The first use of the FM 2299 designation was in Moore County, from SH 152, 4.5 miles (7.2 km) west of the Hutchinson County line, to a point 4.7 miles (7.6 km) south. FM 2299 was cancelled on May 23, 1956, and removed from the highway system because the county could not acquire right-of-way for the route.

=== FM 2299 (1956) ===
Farm to Market Road 2299
- Location: Rains County
- Existed: November 21, 1956–December 31, 1959

The next use of the FM 2299 designation was in Rains County, from SH 19 at Emory to a point 3.0 miles (4.8 km) miles north. On October 31, 1957, the road was extended north 2.3 miles (3.7 km) to FM 275 at Daugherty. FM 2299 was cancelled on December 31, 1959, and transferred to FM 275.
