= Texas State Highway 64 =

State highway in Texas

State Highway 64

Route information
- Maintained by TxDOT
- Length: 82.182 mi (132.259 km)
- Existed: 1923–present

Major junctions
- West end: US 80 in Wills Point
- I-20 near Myrtle Springs; US 69 in Tyler
- East end: US 79 / US 259 / SH 43 in Henderson

Location
- Country: United States
- State: Texas

Highway system
- Highways in Texas; Interstate; US; State; Former; Toll; Loops; Spurs; FM/RM; Park; Rec
← SH 63	→ SH 65

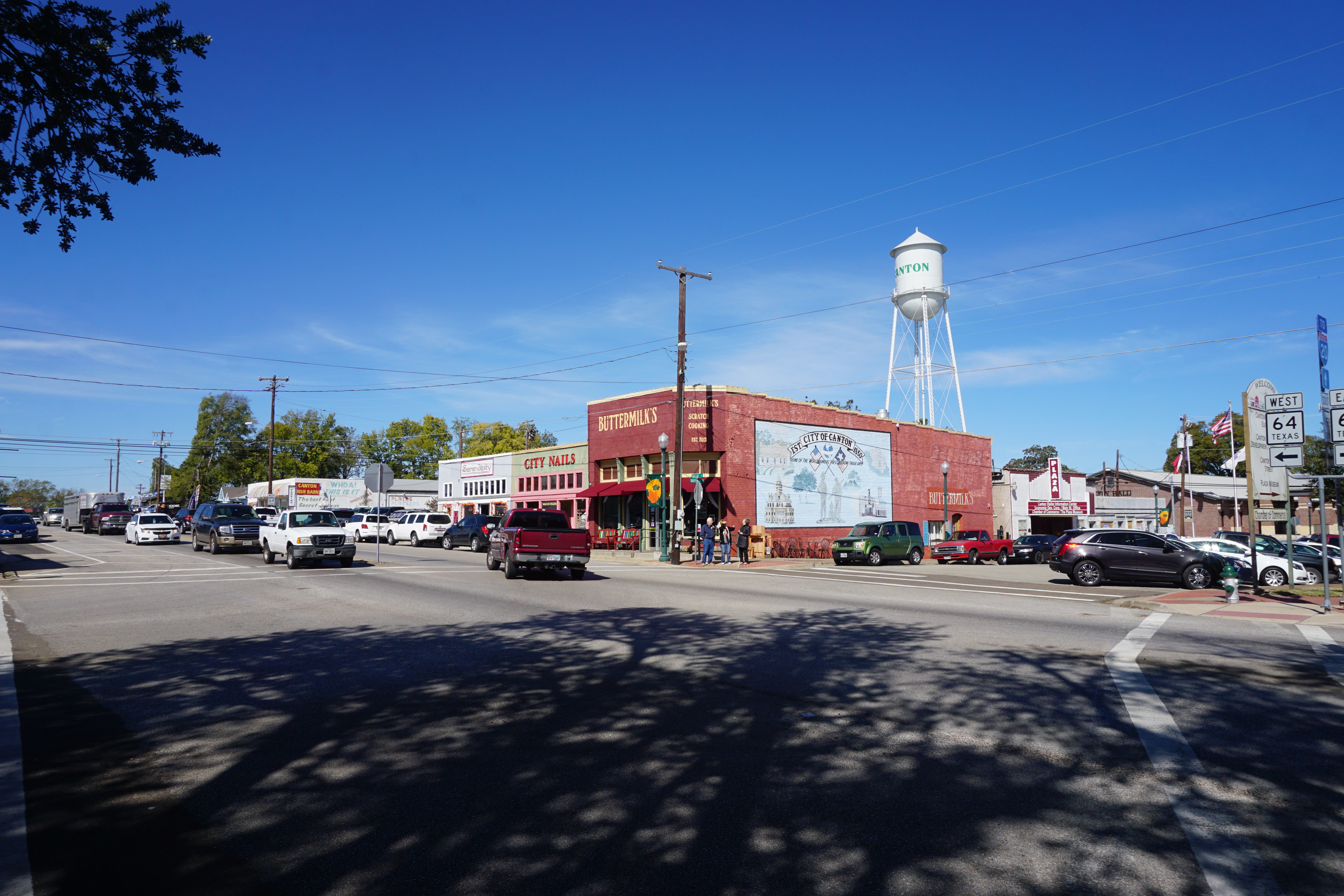
Texas State Highway 64 as West Dallas Street in Canton

State Highway 64 (SH 64) is a Texas state highway that runs from Wills Point via Tyler to Henderson.

== History ==
SH 64 was originally designated on August 21, 1923 to replace SH 15A from Wills Point to Carthage. On November 19, 1923, it was extended east to the Louisiana state line. On September 26, 1939, the portion east of Henderson was already part of U.S. Highway 79, which it was cosigned with since 1935. The remaining portion has not changed since.

== Major junctions ==
County	Location	mi	km	Destinations	Notes
Van Zandt	Wills Point	0.0	0.0	US 80 – Wills Point, Edgewood	Western terminus
Van Zandt	Myrtle Springs	7.2	11.6	FM 1504 north – Edgewood	
Van Zandt		8.3	13.4	I-20 – Longview, Dallas	I-20 exit 523
Van Zandt	Canton	12.3	19.8	FM 859 north (First Monday Lane) – Edgewood	
Van Zandt	Canton	12.9	20.8	SH 198 south	
Van Zandt	Canton	13.0	20.9	SH 19 (Trade Days Boulevard) to I-20 – Emory, Athens	
Van Zandt	Canton	13.7	22.0	FM 17 north – Grand Saline	
Van Zandt	Canton	14.2	22.9	SH 243 west – Kaufman	
Van Zandt		17.6	28.3	FM 16 east – Van	
Van Zandt		20.4	32.8	FM 1653 south – Martins Mill	
Van Zandt		23.8	38.3	FM 279 east – Ben Wheeler	
Van Zandt	Ben Wheeler	24.7	39.8	FM 773	
Van Zandt	Ben Wheeler	25.1	40.4	FM 858	
Van Zandt		31.9	51.3	FM 314 – Van, Edom	
Smith		41.5	66.8	FM 279 west – Edom	
Smith		41.9	67.4	FM 2661 south	
Smith		42.0	67.6	Loop 49 Toll to I-20	Interchange
Smith		43.7	70.3	FM 724 north – Mount Sylvan	
Smith	Tyler	47.2	76.0	Loop 323	
Smith	Tyler	48.0	77.2	Loop 235 west (Chandler Highway)	
Smith	Tyler	48.6	78.2	US 69 north (Glenwood Boulevard) / SH 110 north	West end of US 69 / SH 110 overlap
Smith	Tyler	48.9	78.7	SH 31 (West Front Street)	
Smith	Tyler	50.1	80.6	SH 155 south (South Vine Avenue)	West end of SH 155 overlap
Smith	Tyler	50.7	81.6	US 69 south (South Broadway Avenue)	East end of US 69 overlap
Smith	Tyler	51.3	82.6	SH 110 south / SH 155 north	East end of SH 110 / SH 155 overlap; access to UT Health Tyler
Smith	Tyler	52.8	85.0	Loop 323	
Smith	Tyler	53.5	86.1	Loop 124 west	
Smith	Bascom	55.8	89.8	FM 848 south	
Smith		56.3	90.6	Spur 248 west – Lake Tyler	
Smith		60.8	97.8	FM 3226 north	
Smith	Swinney Town	63.6	102.4	FM 2607 north	
Smith	Arp	67.7	109.0	SH 135 – Arp, Overton	Interchange
Smith		71.6	115.2	FM 2089 north – Overton	
Smith	Wright City	72.0	115.9	FM 15 south – Troup	
Rusk	Turnertown	74.3	119.6	SH 42 – New London, Price	
Rusk	Henderson	81.6	131.3	Loop 571	Interchange
Rusk	Henderson	83.0	133.6	SH 323 west / Bus. SH 64 east – Overton, Henderson	
Rusk	Henderson	83.8	134.9	Bus. SH 64 west	Access to UT Health Henderson
Rusk	Henderson	84.2	135.5	US 79 / US 259 / SH 43 north – Kilgore, Carthage, Tatum	Eastern terminus
1.000 mi = 1.609 km; 1.000 km = 0.621 mi: Concurrency terminus; Electronic toll collection

== Business route ==
Business State Highway 64
- Location: Henderson
- Length: 3.788 mi (6.096 km)
- Existed: June 21, 1990–present

SH 64 has one business route in Henderson, inventoried by TxDOT as Business SH 64-E. The route was designated on June 21, 1990, which, along with Bus. US 79, replaced segments of Loop 153 and Loop 154. The two business routes are briefly concurrent through downtown Henderson.

Loop 153 was designated on May 18, 1944 from SH 64 and SH 323 southeast to downtown Henderson and then east to US 79. On December 19, 1955, the section from US 79 & FM 840 to US 79 was removed from the state highway system. On June 21, 1990, Loop 153 was cancelled, as it was transferred to Bus. SH 64-E and Bus. US 79-F.

Loop 154 was designated on May 18, 1944 from SH 64 southward through Henderson to US 79. On June 21, 1990, Loop 154 was cancelled, as it was transferred to Bus. SH 64-E and Bus. US 79-F.
