= Texas State Highway 322 =

Highway in Texas

State Highway 322
- SH 322, highlighted in red

Route information
- Maintained by TxDOT
- Length: 17.94 mi (Note: The official length is shorter than the actual length as TxDOT considers SH 322 to be discontinuous at SH 149 rather than concurrent with it.) (28.87 km)
- Existed: October 30, 1939–present

Major junctions
- South end: US 259 in Henderson
- North end: I-20 / US 259 / Loop 281 in Longview

Location
- Country: United States
- State: Texas
- Counties: Rusk, Gregg

Highway system
- Highways in Texas; Interstate; US; State; Former; Toll; Loops; Spurs; FM/RM; Park; Rec
← SH 321	→ SH 323

State Highway 322 (SH 322) is a Texas state highway that runs from US 259 in Henderson to I-20/US 259/Loop 281 in Longview.

== Route description ==
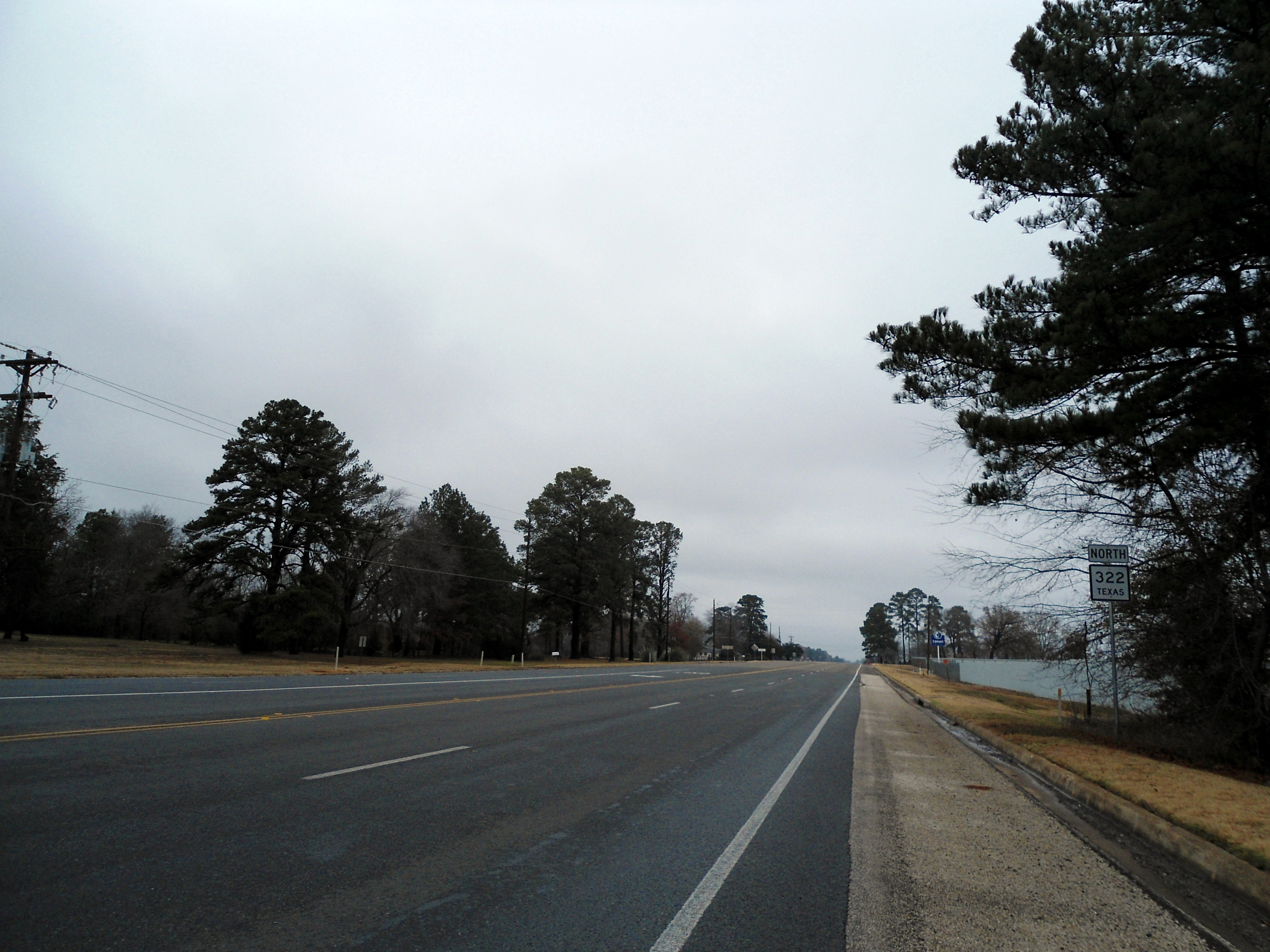
SH 322 near Lakeport

SH 322 begins at a junction with US 259 in Henderson. It heads northeast from this junction to an intersection with FM 850. The highway continues to the northeast to an intersection with FM 1249. Heading towards the north, the highway continues to a junction with FM 2011. The highway continues to the north to an intersection with FM 2204. It continues to the north to a junction with FM 349 in Lakeport. As the highway continues to the northeast, it intersects SH 149 in Lakeport. SH 320 and SH 149 begin to run concurrently to the north until they split in Longview. SH 322 reaches its northern terminus at I-20 in Longview. The roadway continues to the north as Loop 281.

== History ==
SH 322 was designated in 1939, running from SH 26 (now US 259) in Henderson, passing near Crims Chapel and Monroe, to the Gregg–Rusk county line. In 1944, the highway was extended north to SH 149 south of Longview. In 1967, SH 322 was extended northward to I-20.

== Major intersections ==
County	Location	mi	km	Destinations	Notes
Rusk	Henderson	0.0	0.0	US 259 – Kilgore, Downtown Henderson	
Rusk		4.0	6.4	FM 850 west	
Rusk		11.7	18.8	FM 1249 west – Monroe	
Gregg		13.9	22.4	FM 2011 – Kilgore, Lake Cherokee	
Gregg		15.0	24.1	FM 2204 west – East Texas Regional Airport	
Gregg		15.8	25.4	FM 349 – Kilgore, Tatum	
Gregg	Lakeport	17.2	27.7	SH 149 south – Tatum	South end of SH 149 overlap
Gregg	Longview	19.2	30.9	SH 149 north (Eastman Road) to US 259	North end of SH 149 overlap
Gregg	Longview	19.5	31.4	I-20 / US 259 / Loop 281 north / MLK Boulevard – Dallas, Shreveport	Parclo interchange; I-20 exit 595
1.000 mi = 1.609 km; 1.000 km = 0.621 mi: Concurrency terminus
