= Texas State Highway 323 =

State highway in Texas

State Highway 323
- SH 323, highlighted in red

Route information
- Maintained by TxDOT
- Length: 12.801 mi (20.601 km)
- Existed: 1939–present

Major junctions
- West end: SH 135 in Overton
- East end: SH 64 in Henderson

Location
- Country: United States
- State: Texas

Highway system
- Highways in Texas; Interstate; US; State; Former; Toll; Loops; Spurs; FM/RM; Park; Rec
← SH 322	→ SH 324

State Highway 323 (SH 323) is a Texas state highway running from Overton southeast to Henderson. The route was designated on October 30, 1939, from SH 26 (now US 259) 3 miles north of Henderson to Overton. On April 28, 1942, it was extended south to Henderson. On May 18, 1944, the section from SH 64 to Henderson became part of Loop 153 (now Business US 79 and Business SH 64).

== Route description ==
SH 323 begins at a junction with SH 135 in Overton. It heads southeast from this junction to an intersection with FM 838. The highway continues to the southeast to an intersection with SH 42. Heading towards the southeast, the highway continues to a junction with Loop 571. The highway continues to the southeast to an intersection with FM 2276. SH 323 reaches its eastern terminus at SH 64 in Henderson.

== Junction list ==
The entire route is in Rusk County.

Location	mi	km	Destinations	Notes
Overton	0.0	0.0	SH 135 (Commerce Street)	
	1.9	3.1	FM 1513 east	
	3.3	5.3	FM 838 west	
	3.4	5.5	SH 42	
	11.5	18.5	Loop 571	
	12.0	19.3	FM 2276 north	
Henderson	12.8	20.6	SH 64 / Bus. SH 64 east (Van Buren Street)	
1.000 mi = 1.609 km; 1.000 km = 0.621 mi
