= Texas State Highway 300 =

State highway in Texas

State Highway 300
- SH 300, highlighted in red

Route information
- Maintained by TxDOT
- Length: 18.624 mi (29.972 km)
- Existed: August 2, 1968–present

Major junctions
- South end: US 80 at Longview
- Loop 281 in Longview
- North end: US 271 / SH 155 at Gilmer

Location
- Country: United States
- State: Texas
- Counties: Gregg, Upshur

Highway system
- Highways in Texas; Interstate; US; State; Former; Toll; Loops; Spurs; FM/RM; Park; Rec
← SH 299	→ SH 301

State Highway 300 (SH 300) is a Texas state highway that runs from Longview northwest to Gilmer. It is also known as Gilmer Road in Gregg County.

== Route description ==
SH 300 begins at an intersection with U.S. Route 80 on the west side of Longview, and travels northwest through residential sections of the city. The route continues to the northwest, passing through agricultural sections of southeastern Upshur County before reaching its terminus at U.S. Route 271 and State Highway 155 on the far southern edge of Gilmer. The route travels nearly 19 miles.

== History ==
SH 300 was previously designated on January 23, 1939 on a route from Atlanta south to Frazier Creek. On November 20, 1939, SH 300 was extended south to SH 49. The route was redesignated on December 16, 1943 as SH 43 when it was extended farther north. The current route was designated on August 2, 1968, replacing FM 1403.

== Major intersections ==
County	Location	mi	km	Destinations	Notes
Gregg	Longview	0.00	0.00	US 80 (West Marshall Avenue)	
Gregg	Longview	1.83	2.95	Loop 281 – LeTourneau University, Kilgore College, Texas Baptist College, UTT Longview, Airport	
Gregg	Longview	5.05	8.13	FM 2275 west (East George Richey Road) – Gladewater	
Upshur	East Mountain	7.05	11.35	FM 1844 – East Mountain, Union Grove, Judson	
Upshur	East Mountain	9.29	14.95	FM 3358 north	
Upshur		10.71	17.24	FM 726 – West Mountain, Glenwood	
Upshur		12.81	20.62	FM 3358 south / Grouse Road	
Upshur	Gilmer	18.62	29.97	US 271 / SH 155 – Tyler, Gladewater, Pittsburg	
1.000 mi = 1.609 km; 1.000 km = 0.621 mi
