= Texas State Highway Loop 281 =

State highway in Texas

State Highway Loop 281

Route information
- Maintained by TxDOT
- Length: 19.295 mi (31.052 km)
- Existed: 1960–present

Major junctions
- CCW end: I-20 / US 259 / SH 322 in Longview
- SH 31 in Longview; US 80 in Longview; US 259 in Longview; US 80 in Longview
- CW end: I-20 / FM 968 near Longview

Location
- Country: United States
- State: Texas
- Counties: Gregg, Harrison

Highway system
- Highways in Texas; Interstate; US; State; Former; Toll; Loops; Spurs; FM/RM; Park; Rec
← Spur 280	→ Loop 282

State Highway Loop 281 or Loop 281 is a Texas state highway loop that forms a partial beltway around the city of Longview. The highway travels in a clockwise direction around the western, northern, and eastern parts of the city, with I-20 completing the beltway. The western section of Loop 281, from I-20/US 259/SH 322 to US 259 (Eastman Road), is a surface street that mostly travels through heavily developed areas of the city, while the eastern section, from US 259 to I-20/FM 968 is more of a controlled-access highway that travels through less developed areas.

== Route description ==
Loop 281 begins at a partial cloverleaf interchange with I-20/US 259/SH 322 in southern Longview; the highway continues south past I-20/US 259 as SH 322. The highway travels in a slight northwest direction along Estes Parkway for approximately 0.5 miles (0.80 km) before turning to the west, with Estes Parkway continuing north towards LeTourneau University. Loop 281 briefly dips in a southwestern direction before turning back northwest, traveling near many industrial areas in south/southwest Longview. The highway crosses over a rail line and FM 2087, turns north, intersects Toledo Circle (which connects FM 2087 to Loop 281), then has an interchange with SH 31. Loop 281 turns northwest at an intersection with FM 2205 (Jaycee Road) and becomes known as East Harrison Road, passing near Lear Park. The highway turns west at West Cotton Street, passes by Pine Tree Middle School and Parkway Elementary School, then turns northwest at FM 2206, with that highway continuing the Harrison Road designation. Loop 281 continues to travel through industrial areas of the city before intersecting US 80 (West Marshall Avenue); north of here, the highway begins to travel through more heavily developed areas of the city.

Loop 281 starts to travel in a northeast direction at FM 1845 (Pine Tree Toad), passing by a few residential areas. Past SH 300 (Gilmer Road), the highway is lined with many businesses with some commercial and retail areas. At Spur 63, Loop 281 travels in an eastern direction and passes by Longview Mall, then turns southeast at Spur 502 (Judson Road). The highway passes a few blocks north of Longview Regional Medical Center then has an interchange with US 259 (Eastman Road); from here, the route of Loop 281 gradually becomes more rural with little development. The highway has interchanges with Tryon Road and FM 2208 (Alpine Road) and passes near a couple of subdivisions. Loop 281 passes near the Longview Heights neighborhood, has an interchange with US 80, then turns south. South of US 80, the highway travels through rural farmland that is slightly forested. Development along the route slightly picks up near County Road 3413, with Loop 281 passing by a rural subdivision with some business lining the highway. Loop 281 intersects FM 968 just north of I-20, with Loop 281 and FM 968 having a brief overlap before Loop 281 ends at I-20, with the highway continuing past here as FM 968.

== History ==
Loop 281 was previously designated on December 2, 1954, on a route from US 82 / US 287 northwest to US 281 in Wichita Falls. The route was redesignated on November 7, 1958, as Loop 165 (now US 287 Bus. and SH 240) "to avoid confusion with US 281 by the traveling public." The current route was designated on March 22, 1960, but only from US 80 north, east, and south to I-20. On March 25, 1992, Loop 281 was extended south from US 80 to I-20, replacing part of FM 1845.

== Major intersections ==
County	Location	mi	km	Destinations	Notes
Gregg	Longview	0.0	0.0	I-20 / US 259 / SH 322 south (Estes Parkway) / MLK Boulevard – Dallas, Shreveport	Parclo interchange; I-20 exit 595; roadway continues past I-20 as SH 322
Gregg	Longview	3.7	6.0	FM 2087 south	
Gregg	Longview	3.8	6.1	SH 31	Interchange
Gregg	Longview	4.6	7.4	FM 2205 east (Jaycee Road)	
Gregg	Longview	6.2	10.0	FM 2206 west (Harrison Road)	
Gregg	Longview	6.9	11.1	US 80 (West Marshall Avenue) – Gladewater, Marshall	
Gregg	Longview	7.1	11.4	FM 1845 (Pine Tree Road)	
Gregg	Longview	8.4	13.5	SH 300 (Gilmer Road) – Gilmer	
Gregg	Longview	10.4	16.7	Spur 63 (McCann Road)	
Gregg	Longview	10.9	17.5	Spur 502 (Judson Road) – Daingerfield	
Gregg	Longview	12.2	19.6	US 259 (Eastman Road) to I-20 – Daingerfield	Interchange
Gregg	Longview	12.6	20.3	Tryon Road	Interchange
Gregg	Longview	13.5	21.7	FM 2208 (Alpine Road)	Interchange
Harrison	Longview	16.2	26.1	US 80 – Marshall, Longview	Interchange; access to CHRISTUS Good Shepherd Medical Center - Longview
Harrison		19.2	30.9	FM 968 west	Counterclockwise end of FM 968 overlap
Harrison		19.3	31.1	I-20 / FM 968 east – Dallas, Shreveport	Clockwise end of FM 968; I-20 exit 599
1.000 mi = 1.609 km; 1.000 km = 0.621 mi: Concurrency terminus
