= Texas State Highway 149 =

State highway in Texas

State Highway 149
- SH 149 highlighted in red

Route information
- Maintained by TxDOT
- Length: 33.9 mi (54.6 km)
- Existed: 1930–present

Major junctions
- South end: Future I-369 / US 59 / Bus. US 59 at Carthage
- US 79 in Carthage; I-20 / US 259 in Longview
- North end: US 80 / US 259 at Longview

Location
- Country: United States
- State: Texas
- Counties: Panola, Rusk, Gregg

Highway system
- Highways in Texas; Interstate; US; State; Former; Toll; Loops; Spurs; FM/RM; Park; Rec
← SH 148	→ SH 150

State Highway 149 (SH 149) is a state highway that runs from Carthage to Longview in east Texas.

== History ==
SH 149 was originally designated on March 19, 1930 along its current route, replacing SH 26A. On August 4, 1932, SH 149 was extended north to Daingerfield. On June 25, 1935, everything north of Longview was cancelled (this section north of Longview was intended to be cancelled on August 15, 1933), but was restored on June 16, 1936. The northern extension was transferred to SH 26 on September 26, 1939. On October 28, 1987, a loop around Carthage was completed, with SH 149 being routed around the western side of town along Loop 436. The old routing that entered Carthage was re-designated Spur 572. Loop 436 was cancelled on September 25, 1989 to remove concurrent mileage with SH 149.

== Route description ==
SH 149 begins at an interchange with US 59 (Future I-369 corridor) on the south side of Carthage. Along the west side of the beltway around town, the highway becomes concurrent with US 79. At the interchange with Spur 572, the route leaves the beltway and heads northwest. It runs through Beckville and intersects SH 43 in Tatum. In Lakeport, near the East Texas Regional Airport, the highway intersects and runs concurrent with SH 322. It crosses over the Sabine River as it leaves town. At the intersection of Estes Parkway and Eastman Road, north of Lakeport, SH 149 splits from SH 322 and heads to the northeast. It passes under Interstate 20, only interchanging it with the north and south access roads. From there, it runs concurrent with US 259, heading through the east side of Longview. SH 149 reaches its northern terminus at US 80. The road from there continues north only as US 259.

== Major intersections ==
County	Location	mi	km	Destinations	Notes
Panola	Carthage			Future I-369 north / US 59 north (Lasalle Pkwy) / Bus. US 59 (Shelby St) – Tenaha, Marshall	Interchange; U.S. 59 is the future Interstate 369
Panola	Carthage			FM 10 (Market St)	
Panola	Carthage			SH 315 (Sabine St) – Mount Enterprise	
Panola	Carthage			US 79 west / Bus. US 79 east (Panola St)	Interchange, south end of US 79 overlap
Panola				US 79 east (Lasalle Pkwy) / Spur 572 east (Cottage Rd)	Interchange, north end of US 79 overlap
Panola				FM 959 south	South end of FM 959 overlap
Panola				FM 959 north	North end of FM 959 overlap
Panola	Beckville			FM 124 (Fairplay Rd)	
Panola	Beckville			Spur 152 east (Monroe St)	
Rusk	Tatum			SH 43 (Johnson St) – Henderson, Marshall	
Rusk	Tatum			FM 1797 west (Sterling Price St)	
Rusk				FM 782 south	
Gregg				FM 2906 east – Easton	
Gregg				FM 349 east	
Gregg	Lakeport			SH 322 south (Gardiner Mitchell Pkwy) – Henderson	South end of SH 322 overlap
Gregg	Longview			SH 322 north (Estes Pkwy)	North end of SH 322 overlap
Gregg	Longview			I-20 / US 259 south – Kilgore, Marshall	Interchange, south end of US 259 overlap
Gregg	Longview			US 80 north (Marshall Ave) / US 259 – White Oak, Hallsville, Ore City	North end of US 259 overlap
1.000 mi = 1.609 km; 1.000 km = 0.621 mi
