= Texas State Highway 43 =

State highway in Texas

State Highway 43

Route information
- Maintained by TxDOT
- Length: 85.764 mi (138.024 km)
- Existed: by 1933–present

Major junctions
- South end: US 79 / US 259 / SH 64 in Henderson
- I-20 near Marshall; US 59 through Marshall; US 80 in Marshall
- North end: SH 77 in Atlanta

Location
- Country: United States
- State: Texas

Highway system
- Highways in Texas; Interstate; US; State; Former; Toll; Loops; Spurs; FM/RM; Park; Rec
← SH 42	→ I-44

State Highway 43 (SH 43) is a Texas state highway that runs from Henderson to Atlanta.

== Previous routes ==
Historic SH 43

SH 43 was originally proposed on April 23, 1919, to connect SH 42 15 miles north of Longview to Rusk via Henderson. That same day, an intercounty highway was designated from SH 43's north end to Naples. On April 19, 1920, SH 43 was extended north to the Oklahoma state line via Daingerfield. On August 21, 1923, the route had been further changed. The section from Henderson to Longview was transferred to SH 26, the section from Daingerfield to Omaha was transferred to SH 11, and the section from Clarksville to Oklahoma was transferred to SH 66, and the section from Henderson to Rusk transferred to SH 43A. The sections from Clarksville to Omaha and from Daingerfield to Longview were cancelled. (Daingerfield to Longview would later be restored as an extension of SH 149). SH 43 was reassigned to former SH 43A from Kilgore to Taylor, a new route to Leander, and SH 20 to Mason. On December 17, 1923, SH 43 was rerouted to end in Marshall. On January 21, 1924, SH 43 was truncated to Taylor, with the section from Taylor to Round Rock already part of SH 2B, Round Rock to Leander cancelled and Leander to Mason transferred to SH 29. On April 6, 1932, SH 43 was extended back to Round Rock, replacing part of SH 2B. On February 9, 1933, SH 43 was extended northeast to Karnack. On January 18, 1935, it was extended to Caddo Lake Park. On February 11, 1935, SH 43 Loop was designated through Tatum. On July 15, 1935, the section from Karnack to Caddo Lake Park was cancelled (as it was not built yet). This section was restored on February 11, 1937. On September 26, 1939, the section from Round Rock to Palestine had been transferred to US 79 (cosigned starting in 1934). SH 43 Loop was renumbered as Loop 43. On December 16, 1943, another section was created from SH 49 to US 59 in Atlanta, replacing SH 300 and creating a gap in the route. On August 30, 1950, the section from Karnack to Caddo Lake Park was transferred to FM 134. On June 1, 1967, the section from what was then FM 1915 to FM 134 was renumbered as Spur 449. Instead, SH 43 was rerouted over FM 1915, which was decommissioned, closing the gap. On October 31, 2013, a section from SH 77 to US 59 was given to the city of Atlanta. With a length of approximately 85.8 miles (138.1 km), this highway offers travelers a unique and captivating journey through the heart of Texas.

Historic SH 43A

SH 43A was originally designated on January 19, 1920, as an alternate route to SH 43, splitting in Kilgore and running southwest to Troup. On November 21, 1917, an intercounty highway was designated from Taylor to Hearne. SH 44A was designated on July 20, 1920, along the part of the intercounty highway from Taylor to Milano. On January 17, 1921, SH 43A extended southwest through Palestine to Taylor along a new route to Hearne, the intercounty highway from Hearne to Milano, and SH 44A from Milano to Taylor. On August 21, 1923, the entire route had been transferred to the main route of SH 43. SH 43A was instead designated from Palestine to Henderson, replacing the original SH 43 and part of SH 22. On December 17, 1923, it was cancelled. On February 18, 1924, it was restored, but it ended at New Summerfield instead. On September 17, 1929, it was rerouted east to Mount Enterprise, with the road to New Summerfield becoming a branch. On March 19, 1930, this route became an extension of SH 22. The branch to New Summerfield was erroneously cancelled, but became part of SH 110 on November 30, 1932.

== Major junctions ==
County	Location	mi	km	Destinations	Notes
Rusk	Henderson			US 79 / US 259 / SH 64	Southern terminus
Rusk				FM 1251 / FM 1716	
Rusk				FM 2658	
Rusk				FM 1716	
Rusk	Tatum			SH 149	
Panola				FM 1794	
Panola				FM 959	
Harrison				FM 2625	
Harrison				I-20	I-20 exit 614.
Harrison	Marshall			US 59 south	South end of US 59 overlap
Harrison	Marshall			US 80	
Harrison	Marshall			US 59 north	North end of US 59 overlap
Harrison	Marshall			Loop 390 (Future I-369)	
Harrison				FM 2682	
Harrison	Karnack			Spur 449	
Harrison				FM 134 south	South end of FM 134 overlap
Harrison				FM 134 north / FM 2198	North end of FM 134 overlap
Marion				FM 805 east	South end of FM 805 overlap
Marion				FM 805 west	North end of FM 805 overlap
Marion	Smithland			SH 49	
Marion				FM 2683	
Cass				FM 125	
Cass	Bivins			FM 1841 east	South end of brief FM 1841 overlap
Cass	Bivins			FM 248 / FM 1841 west	North end of brief FM 1841 overlap
Cass				FM 2328	
Cass	Atlanta			SH 77	
1.000 mi = 1.609 km; 1.000 km = 0.621 mi: Concurrency terminus
