= Wright City, Texas =

Unincorporated community in Smith and Rusk counties in Texas, United States

- Unincorporated community
- Location within Texas Location within the United States
- Coordinates: 32°11′50″N 94°59′12″W
- Country: United States
- State: Texas
- County: Smith, Rusk
- Elevation: 420 ft (130 m)
- Time zone: UTC-6 (Central (CST))
  - Summer (DST): UTC-5 (CDT)
- Area codes: 430 & 903
- GNIS feature ID: 1350611

Wright City is an unincorporated community in Smith and Rusk counties in Texas, United States. It is located at along Texas State Highway 64, at its junction with the east end of Farm to Market Road 15.

== See also ==
- List of unincorporated communities in Texas
