= Monroe, Rusk County, Texas =

Unincorporated community in Rusk County, Texas, United States

Monroe, Texas
- Unincorporated community
- Location within Texas Location within the United States
- Coordinates: 32°20′08″N 94°44′16″W
- Country: United States
- State: Texas
- County: Rusk
- Elevation: 358 ft (109 m)
- Time zone: UTC-6 (Central (CST))
  - Summer (DST): UTC-5 (CDT)
- Area codes: 430, 903
- GNIS feature ID: 1380204

Monroe is an unincorporated community in Rusk County, Texas, United States. According to the Handbook of Texas, the community had a population of 96 in 2000. It is located within the Longview, Texas metropolitan area.

== Geography ==
Monroe is located in northeastern Rusk County near Wyche Branch, Bonner Creek, and Tiawichi Creek. Texas State Highway 322 exits into Monroe on Farm to Market Road 1249 west.

== Education ==
Today, the community is served by the Kilgore Independent School District.

== See also ==
- List of unincorporated communities in Texas
