= U.S. Route 259 =

U.S. Numbered Highway in Texas and Oklahoma in the United States

U.S. Route 259
- US 259 highlighted in red

Route information
- Auxiliary route of US 59
- Length: 250 mi (400 km)
- Existed: 1963–present

Major junctions
- South end: Future I-69 / US 59 / I-69 BL / Bus. US 59 near Nacogdoches, TX
- I-20 near Kilgore, TX; US 84 at Mount Enterprise, TX; US 79 at Henderson, TX; I-20 at Kilgore, TX; US 80 at Longview, TX; US 67 at Omaha, TX; I-30 near Omaha, TX; US 82 at De Kalb, TX; US 70 / SH-3 from Idabel, OK to Broken Bow, OK
- North end: US 59 / US 270 near Heavener, OK

Location
- Country: United States
- States: Texas, Oklahoma

Highway system
- United States Numbered Highway System; List; Special; Divided

U.S. Route 259 (US 259) is a north–south spur of U.S. Route 59 that runs for 250 miles (400 km) through rural areas of northeastern Texas and southeastern Oklahoma. The highway's southern terminus is near Nacogdoches, Texas, at an interchange with its parent route, US 59. Its northern terminus is in the Ouachita Mountains, approximately 15 miles (24 km) south of Heavener, Oklahoma, where it reunites with US 59. For most of its length, US 259 lies 30–50 miles (48–80 km) to the west of its parent route.

== Route description ==
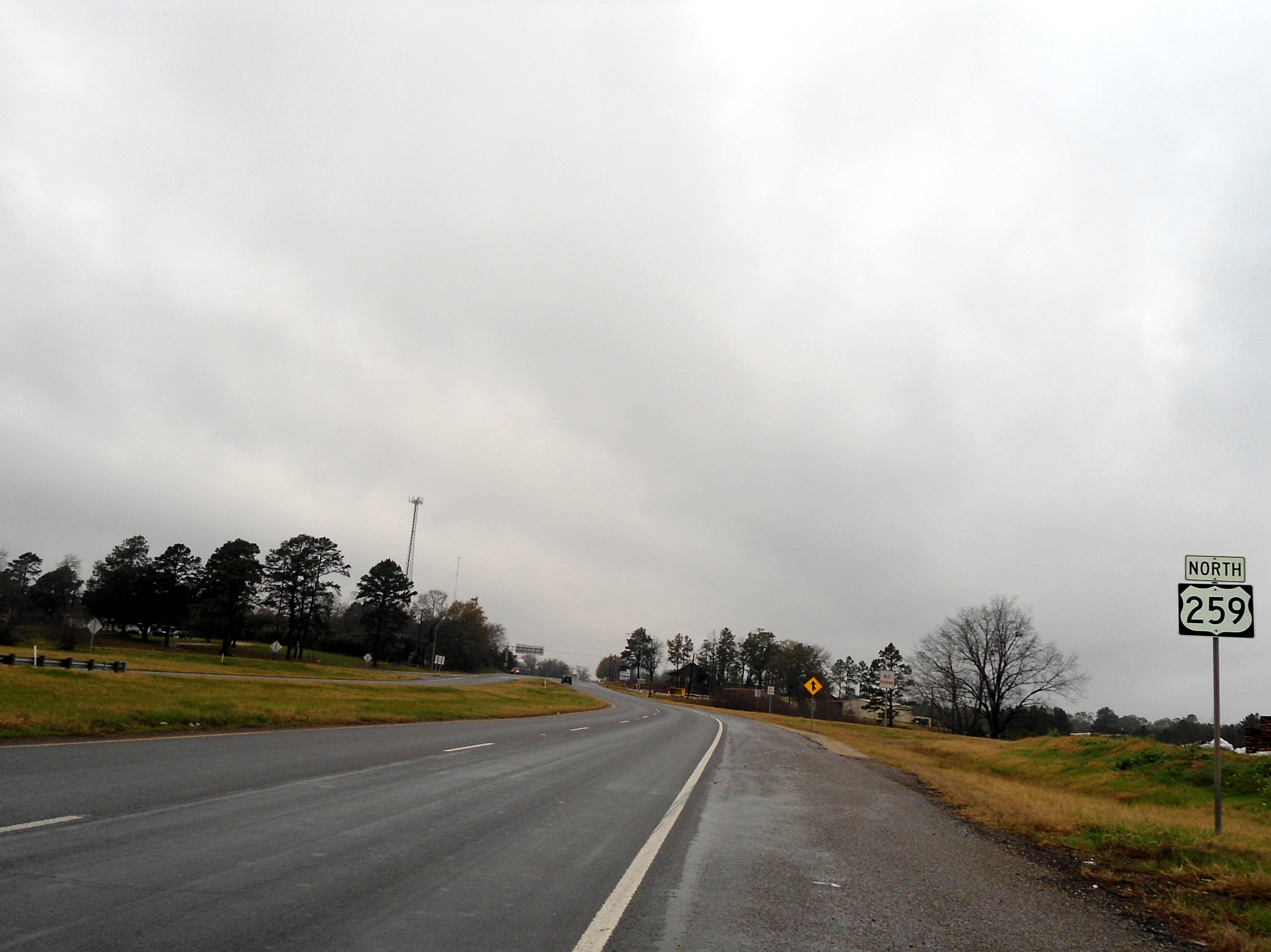
First reassurance marker heading north from the southern terminus in Nacogdoches, Texas

=== Texas ===
US 259 begins at an intersection with its parent, US 59 (future Interstate 69), on the north side of Nacogdoches, Texas. The highway continues due north, passing through Mount Enterprise, and around the eastern side of Henderson and Kilgore. In Kilgore, Texas, US 259 is known as the Charles K. Devall Memorial Highway, as named by the Texas Legislature. It then has a concurrency with Interstate 20 of about 6 miles (9.7 km), then continues north around the eastern edge of Longview along Eastman Rd. The highway continues due north, crossing Interstate 30 in northern Morris County, and crossing into Oklahoma in northwest Bowie County.

=== Oklahoma ===
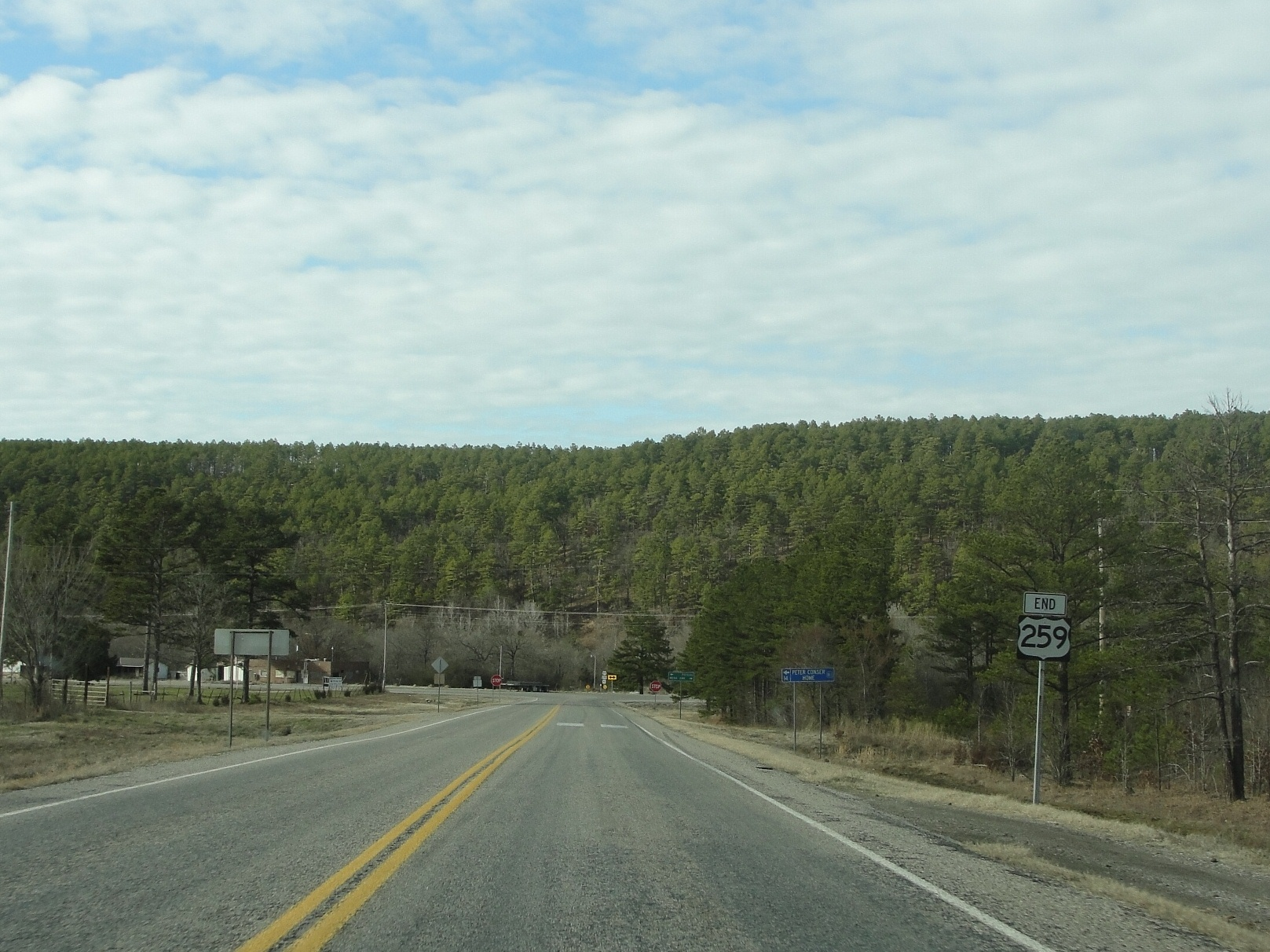
Northern terminus of US 259 in the Ouachita Mountains

After crossing into McCurtain County, Oklahoma, US-259 immediately meets State Highway 87, and continues north through Harris. Maps indicate that US-259 and SH-87 overlap to Idabel, but officially, this is not the case, and ODOT signage does not reflect a concurrency.

US-259 bypasses Idabel to the south and east, concurring with U.S. Highway 70 Bypass. East of Idabel, the bypass route ends, and US-259 begins a concurrency with mainline US-70 and SH-3. The three highways continue north to Broken Bow, where US-70 splits to the east toward DeQueen, Arkansas, and SH-3 splits to the west, bound for Antlers. US-259 continues north alone, taking a winding path through the Ouachita Mountains of southeastern Oklahoma. The route passes Broken Bow Lake on its west side, with State Highway 259A serving as an access loop to the lake and Beavers Bend State Resort. Near the lake, US-259 crosses through the Ouachita National Forest for the first time. Near Smithville, the highway serves as the western terminus of State Highway 4.

North of the SH-4 junction, US-259 crosses into Le Flore County. The U.S. route then serves as the eastern terminus of SH-144 near Octavia. US-259 reenters the national forest north of this junction, and intersects SH-63 at Big Cedar. It then has a junction with SH-1, the Talimena Drive. The highway reunites with US-59 about 10 miles (16 km) south of Heavener, reaching its northern terminus.

== History ==
In Texas, the highway was designated in 1962 and assumed the entire route of a previous iteration and alignment of State Highway 26, which was then cancelled. (The SH 26 designation has since returned, on another roadway elsewhere in the state.)

Prior to 1985, US 259 between Kilgore and Longview followed the current route of Texas State Highway 31. It entered Longview from the southwest at the intersection of South Street and Spur 63. It then followed Spur 63 to US 80. US 259 then ran concurrently with US 80 to Eastman Road. At the US 80/Eastman Rd. intersection, the previous alignment of US 259 turned left to go north on Eastman. In 1985, US 259 was rerouted to its current route along Interstate 20 to Eastman Road, then left to go north, along the eastern edge of Longview, bypassing the central business district.

== Major intersections ==
State	County	Location	mi	km	Exit	Destinations	Notes
Texas	Nacogdoches	Redfield	0.00	0.00		Future I-69 / US 59 / I-69 BL south / Bus. US 59 south (North Street) – Nacogdoches, Garrison, Lufkin, SFASU	Interchange; southern terminus; road continues as Bus. I-69 south/Bus. US 59 south (North Street); U.S. 59 is the future Interstate 69
Texas	Nacogdoches					FM 698 west	
Texas	Nacogdoches					SH 204 west – Cushing	
Texas	Nacogdoches					FM 2664 east	
Texas	Nacogdoches					FM 1087 east	
Texas	Rusk	Mount Enterprise				US 84 (Rusk Street) – Rusk, Timpson	
Texas	Rusk	Mount Enterprise				SH 315 east – Carthage	
Texas	Rusk					FM 2496 west	
Texas	Rusk					FM 1798 – Laneville, Minden	Interchange
Texas	Rusk					FM 3310 north	
Texas	Rusk	Henderson				US 79 south – Jacksonville, Palestine	South end of US 79 overlap
Texas	Rusk	Henderson				Bus. US 79 south / FM 840 south – Downtown Henderson	Access to UT Health Henderson
Texas	Rusk	Henderson				US 79 north / SH 43 north / SH 64 west – Tyler, Tatum, Carthage	North end of US 79 overlap
Texas	Rusk	Henderson				FM 782 east – Oak Hill	
Texas	Rusk	Henderson				SH 322 north – Airport	
Texas	Rusk					Loop 571 south (Landon Alford Loop)	
Texas	Rusk					FM 2276 south	South end of FM 2276 overlap
Texas	Rusk					FM 2276 north	North end of FM 2276 overlap
Texas	Rusk	Jacobs				FM 850 – Overton	
Texas	Rusk	Pitner Junction				FM 918 west – Overton	
Texas	Rusk					Bus. US 259 north – Kilgore	Interchange; northbound exit and southbound entrance
Texas	Rusk					FM 1249	Interchange
Texas	Gregg					FM 2204	Interchange
Texas	Gregg	Kilgore				FM 349	Interchange
Texas	Gregg	Kilgore				Bus. US 259 south (SH 31 west) – Kilgore	Interchange; southbound exit and northbound entrance; south end of SH 31 overlap
Texas	Gregg	Kinsloe				SH 31 east to I-20 west	North end of SH 31 overlap
Texas	Gregg	Kinsloe				I-20 west – Dallas	South end of I-20 overlap; southbound exit and northbound entrance; I-20 exit 589; southbound entrance via Post Oak Road
Texas	Gregg				591	FM 2087 (Old Kilgore Highway) / FM 2011	Exit numbers follow I-20
Texas	Gregg	Longview			595	SH 322 south (Estes Parkway) / Loop 281 north – Downtown, Longview, Amtrak	Split into exits 595A (south) and 595B (north) northbound
Texas	Gregg	Longview				I-20 east / SH 149 south (Eastman Road south) – Carthage	North end of I-20 overlap; south end of SH 149 overlap; I-20 exit 596
Texas	Gregg	Longview				SH 149 ends / US 80 (Marshall Avenue) – Downtown Longview, Hallsville, Marshall, Kilgore College	Northern terminus of SH 149; north end of SH 149 overlap; Access to CHRISTUS Good Shepherd Medical Center - Longview
Texas	Gregg	Longview				FM 2208 (Alpine Street) – Harleton	
Texas	Gregg	Longview				Loop 281	Interchange
Texas	Gregg					FM 1844 west	
Texas	Gregg					FM 2751	
Texas	Gregg					Spur 502 south – Downtown Longview	
Texas	Gregg					FM 449 east	
Texas	Gregg					FM 1650 west – Gilmer	
Texas	Upshur	Diana				FM 3245 east	
Texas	Upshur	Diana				SH 154 – Gilmer, Marshall	
Texas	Upshur	Old Diana				FM 726 – Lake O' The Pines, Jefferson	
Texas	Upshur	Ore City				FM 450 south / FM 1649 west – Harleton, Lake O' The Pines	
Texas	Upshur					SH 155 – Linden, Gilmer	Interchange
Texas	Upshur					FM 557 west – Pittsburg	
Texas	Camp	No major junctions					
Texas	Morris	Lone Star				FM 729 east (Lone Star Boulevard) – Jefferson, Lake O' The Pines North Shore	
Texas	Morris	Lone Star				FM 250 north (Industrial Boulevard) – Hughes Springs	
Texas	Morris					FM 3421 east	
Texas	Morris	Jenkins				FM 144 north / FM 997 south – Cason	
Texas	Morris	Daingerfield				SH 11 east / SH 49 east (W.M. Watson Boulevard) – Hughes Springs, Linden, Jefferson, Daingerfield State Park	South end of SH 11 / SH 49 overlap
Texas	Morris	Daingerfield				SH 11 west (W.M. Watson Boulevard) – Pittsburg	North end of SH 11 overlap
Texas	Morris	Daingerfield				FM 130 east	
Texas	Morris					SH 49 west – Mount Pleasant	North end of SH 49 overlap
Texas	Morris	Rocky Branch				SH 338 north – Naples	
Texas	Morris					Spur 284 west	
Texas	Morris	Omaha				US 67 – Mount Pleasant, Texarkana, Omaha Business District	
Texas	Morris					FM 144 south	
Texas	Morris					SH 77 east	
Texas	Morris					I-30 – Dallas, Texarkana	I-30 exit 178
Texas	Morris					FM 71 west – Talco	
Texas	Bowie					FM 561 east – Dalby Springs	
Texas	Bowie					FM 44 east / FM 992 east	South end of FM 44 overlap
Texas	Bowie					FM 44 west to FM 992	North end of FM 44 overlap
Texas	Bowie					FM 1701 west	
Texas	Bowie	De Kalb				US 82 – De Kalb, Clarksville	Interchange
Texas	Bowie	Spring Hill				FM 114 west / FM 2735 south – Clarksville	
Oklahoma	Red River		151.1 0.00	243.2 0.00		Bridge over the Red River	
Oklahoma	McCurtain		1.9	3.1		SH-87 east – Foreman Ark.	Western terminus of SH-87
Oklahoma	McCurtain	Idabel	19.6	31.5		US 70 Byp. west (SW Lincoln Road)	Southern end of US-70 Byp. concurrency; serves McCurtain County Regional Airport
Oklahoma	McCurtain	Idabel	22.6	36.4		SH-3 east (Washington Street) – Haworth	Southern end of SH-3 concurrency
Oklahoma	McCurtain	Idabel	24.5	39.4		US 70 Byp. ends / US 70 west – Southeastern Oklahoma State University McCurtain Campus, Hugo	Eastern terminus of US-70 Byp.; northern end of US-70 Byp. concurrency; southern end of US-70 concurrency
Oklahoma	McCurtain	Broken Bow	32.3	52.0		US 70 east (Martin Luther King Drive) / SH-3 west (Veterans Way) – Antlers, DeQueen Ark.	Northern end of US-70 / SH-3 concurrency
Oklahoma	McCurtain	Broken Bow	38.6	62.1		SH-259A east – Beavers Bend	Clockwise terminus of SH-259A
Oklahoma	McCurtain	Broken Bow	40.6	65.3		SH-259A – Beavers Bend, Broken Bow Dam	Counterclockwise terminus of SH-259A
Oklahoma	McCurtain	Smithville	70.7	113.8		SH-4 east – Smithville	Western terminus of SH-4
Oklahoma	Le Flore		75.4	121.3		SH-144 west – Octavia	Eastern terminus of SH-144
Oklahoma	Le Flore	Big Cedar	89.6	144.2		SH-63 – Talihina, Mena	
Oklahoma	Le Flore		94.6	152.2		SH-1 (Talimena Scenic Drive)	Interchange via connector road
Oklahoma	Le Flore		98.9	159.2		US 59 / US 270	Northern terminus
1.000 mi = 1.609 km; 1.000 km = 0.621 mi: Concurrency terminus; Incomplete access

== Special routes ==
=== Kilgore business route ===
Business U.S. Highway 259
- Location: Kilgore, Texas
- Existed: 2006–present

US-259 has one Business route in Texas. In 2006, a new bypass was completed around the eastern side of Kilgore. The bypass had been proposed as early as 1965, but funding did not become available until the late 1990s. The new bypass was designated as US-259, while the previous route through the Kilgore business district was designated as a business route. The new business route was approved by the AASHO in September 2006.

=== Idabel bypass ===
U.S. Highway 259 Bypass
- Location: Idabel, Oklahoma
- Existed: 2000

Formerly, US-259 continued into downtown Idabel, and the southeast portion of the Idabel bypass was double-designated as US-70 Bypass and US-259 Bypass. On 6 March 2000, the bypass route was decommissioned, and mainline US-259 was moved onto the bypass. However, as of 2008, some bypass signage is still in place, including signage indicating the former terminus of Bypass US-259 at US-70/SH-3.

=== SH-259A ===
SH-259A, an Oklahoma state highway, is a 10-mile (16 km) loop to Broken Bow Lake and Beavers Bend Resort Park north of Broken Bow, Oklahoma. It lies partially in the Ouachita National Forest and is occasionally signed as a U.S. highway.

== See also ==
=== Related routes ===
- U.S. Route 59
- U.S. Route 159

Browse numbered routes
← SH-251A	OK	→ US 266
