= Holly Lake Ranch, Texas =

- CDP
- Interactive map of Holly Lake Ranch, Texas
- Coordinates: 32°42′45″N 95°12′01″W
- Country: United States
- State: Texas
- County: Wood

Area
  - Total: 9.1 sq mi (24 km^{2})
  - Land: 8.7 sq mi (23 km^{2})
  - Water: 0.4 sq mi (1.0 km^{2})
- Elevation: 345 ft (105 m)

Population (2020)
  - Total: 2,951
  - Density: 340/sq mi (130/km^{2})
- Time zone: UTC-6 (Central (CST))
  - Summer (DST): UTC-5 (CDT)
- Zip Code: 75765
- Area codes: 430, 903
- FIPS code: 4834586
- GNIS feature ID: 2586938

Holly Lake Ranch is a census-designated place (CDP) in Wood County, Texas, United States. This was a new CDP for the 2010 census. As of the 2020 census, Holly Lake Ranch had a population of 2,951.

It is an unincorporated, gated, golf course community managed by a homeowner's association. There is an allied Silver Leaf Resorts community of the same name at the location as well.

== Geography ==
The CDP has a total area of 9.1 square miles (24 km^{2}), of which 8.7 square miles (23 km^{2}) is land and 0.4 square miles (1.0 km^{2}) is water.

== Early history ==
In 1900, D.B. Contes, a cotton buyer from central Texas, moved into the area along Holly Creek off the Big Sandy Creek in this area of Wood County. During World War I and the Great Depression, Contes leased and sold hunting and fishing rights to city residents in 2,700 acre holdings around what would become Holly Lake.

Holly Creek was later dammed to make a place for what is now Holly Lake, and cabins were erected at the lake and along Big Sandy Creek.

== Expansion and development ==
In 1964, Contes sold his interest to E.G. Rodman, an oilman from Odessa, Texas. Rodman built a large home on the lake, and purchased additional land to add to the original 2,700 acres. The cattle ranch the acquisition formed was named Holly Lake Ranch. In December 1969, Dallas real estate developers Bill McKenzie and Jack Wilson executed a contract to purchase the 4,165 acre Holly Lake Ranch property Rodman had assembled. Alex McKenzie and Allen Campbell were financial backers of the project which was named Holly Lake Development Company.

Holly Lake Development company began the development and execution of a master plan. Today, that master plan is largely reflected in the design of Holly Lake Ranch.

An administration building, restaurant, activity center, and condominiums were developed in 1972 and 1973.

== Current status ==
The Holly Lake Ranch cabins and lodging are today managed by Holiday Inn Resorts.

Holly Lake Ranch contains a total of 4,165 acres. In addition to sites for an 18-hole golf course, 210 acre lake, an additional 43-acre lake, three smaller lakes, sports courts, ranges, and grounds, and a sandy beach, Holly Lake Ranch contains 3,342 single family lots with 2,050 homes completed as of January 1, 2010.

The community was formally established in 1971 and features a golf course designed by Leon Howard.

== Demographics ==
Historical population
Census	Pop.	Note	%±
2010	2,774		—
2020	2,951		6.4%
U.S. Decennial Census; 1850–1900 1910; 1920 1930 1940; 1950 1960 1970; 1980 1990 2000; 2010 2020

Holly Lake Ranch first appeared as a census designated place in the 2010 U.S. census.

=== 2020 census ===
Holly Lake Ranch CDP, Texas – Racial and ethnic composition Note: the US Census treats Hispanic/Latino as an ethnic category. This table excludes Latinos from the racial categories and assigns them to a separate category. Hispanics/Latinos may be of any race.
Race / Ethnicity (NH = Non-Hispanic)	Pop 2010	Pop 2020	% 2010	% 2020
White alone (NH)	2,645	2,674	95.35%	90.61%
Black or African American alone (NH)	19	7	0.68%	0.24%
Native American or Alaska Native alone (NH)	14	15	0.50%	0.51%
Asian alone (NH)	11	9	0.40%	0.30%
Native Hawaiian or Pacific Islander alone (NH)	2	0	0.07%	0.00%
Other race alone (NH)	0	7	0.00%	0.24%
Mixed race or Multiracial (NH)	13	121	0.47%	4.10%
Hispanic or Latino (any race)	70	118	2.52%	4.00%
Total	2,774	2,951	100.00%	100.00%
