= Price, Texas =

Price
- Unincorporated community
- Location within the state of Texas Price (the United States)
- Coordinates: 32°08′03″N 94°56′35″W
- Country: United States
- State: Texas
- County: Rusk
- Elevation: 354 ft (108 m)
- Time zone: UTC-6 (Central (CST))
  - Summer (DST): UTC-5 (CDT)
- Area codes: 903, 430
- FIPS code: 48-59516
- GNIS feature ID: 1344553

Price is an unincorporated community in west central Rusk County, Texas, United States. According to the Handbook of Texas, the community had a population of 275 in 2000. It is located within the Longview, Texas metropolitan area.

== History ==
Joseph H. Price established a Methodist church here in 1852. A post office was established here in 1881 under the name Carlysle (Carlisle) and remained in operation until 1904. A new post office was established here in 1940 and was renamed Price for a local family of settlers. Oil refining played a role in the local economy during that decade. Its population peaked at 300 residents between 1950 and 1980 and had five businesses. The population declined to 275 from 1988 to 2000, at which time the community had one business.

== Geography ==
Price is located 8 mi (13 km) west of Henderson in western Rusk County.

== Education ==
The Carlisle Independent School District serves area students.
