= List of Farm to Market Roads in Texas (700–799) =

- Texas Farm to Market Road and Ranch to Market Road markers

Highway names
- Interstates: Interstate Highway X (IH-X, I-X)
- US Highways: U.S. Highway X (US X)
- State: State Highway X (SH X)
- Loops: Loop X
- Spurs: Spur X
- Recreational: Recreational Road X (RE X)
- Farm or Ranch to Market Roads: Farm to Market Road X (FM X); Ranch to Market Road X (RM X)
- Park Roads: Park Road X (PR X)

System links
- Highways in Texas; Interstate; US; State; Former; Toll; Loops; Spurs; FM/RM; Park; Rec

Farm to Market Roads in Texas are owned and maintained by the Texas Department of Transportation (TxDOT).

== FM 700 ==
Farm to Market Road 700
- Location: Howard County
- Length: 10.920 mi (17.574 km)
- Existed: November 8, 1946–present

Farm to Market Road 700 (FM 700) is located in Howard County. It runs from Business I-20 in Big Spring to US 87 north of Big Spring.

FM 700 was designated on November 8, 1946, from US 80 (now Business I-20) west of Big Spring to the north boundary of the U.S. Air Force Training School area (later Webb Air Force Base). This route was formerly War Highway 14 from 1942 to 1946. On October 16, 1951, the road was extended east 2.5 miles (4.0 km) to US 87, replacing a section of PR 8. On July 16, 1957, the road was extended east and north 4.3 miles (6.9 km). On September 27, 1960, the road was extended north 3.9 miles (6.3 km) to SH 350. On June 15, 1961, the northern terminus was relocated to FM 669 and SH 350, shortening the route by 1 mile (1.6 km). On August 30, 1988, a 2.2-mile (3.5 km) section from SH 350 west to US 87 was added.

Junction list

The entire route is in Howard County.

Location	mi	km	Destinations	Notes
Big Spring	0.0	0.0	I-20 BL	
Big Spring	2.1	3.4	US 87 – Big Spring, San Angelo	Interchange
Big Spring	6.0	9.7	I-20 – Midland, Colorado City	I-20 exit 181A
	8.8	14.2	SH 350 – Big Spring, Snyder	
	8.9	14.3	FM 669 north – Gail	
	10.9	17.5	US 87 – Big Spring, Lamesa	
1.000 mi = 1.609 km; 1.000 km = 0.621 mi

== FM 701 ==
Farm to Market Road 701
- Location: Young and Stephens counties
- Length: 16.168 mi (26.020 km)
- Existed: October 15, 1946–present

Farm to Market Road 701 (FM 701) is located in Young and Stephens counties. It runs from SH 67 in South Bend via Eliasville to SH 67.

FM 701 was designated on October 15, 1946, to run from SH 67 in South Bend to Eliasville. On August 1, 1947, a second section from SH 67 north 4.1 miles (6.6 km) to a road intersection was added, creating a gap. On November 23, 1948, the gap was closed.

Junction list

County	Location	mi	km	Destinations	Notes
Stephens		0.0	0.0	SH 67 – Breckenridge, Graham	
Young	Eliasville	9.0	14.5	FM 1974 west	
Young	South Bend	16.2	26.1	SH 67 – Graham, Breckenridge	
1.000 mi = 1.609 km; 1.000 km = 0.621 mi

== FM 702 ==
Farm to Market Road 702
- Location: Coleman County
- Length: 4.491 mi (7.228 km)
- Existed: July 31, 1946–present

Farm to Market Road 702 (FM 702) is located in Coleman County. It runs from US 84 through Novice to US 84.

FM 702 was designated on July 31, 1946, on the current route along the old route of US 84, which was rerouted to bypass Novice.

Junction list

The entire route is in Coleman County.

Location	mi	km	Destinations	Notes
	0.0	0.0	US 84 – Abilene, Coleman	
Novice	2.0	3.2	FM 1770 west – Crews, Winters	
	4.5	7.2	US 84 – Abilene, Coleman	
1.000 mi = 1.609 km; 1.000 km = 0.621 mi

== FM 703 ==
Farm to Market Road 703
- Location: Winkler, Andrews, Martin, Gaines, and Dawson counties
- Existed: November 8, 1946–December 18, 1990

Farm to Market Road 703 (FM 703) was located in West Texas. No highway currently uses the FM 703 designation.

FM 703 was designated on November 8, 1946, from Kermit to the Andrews County line. On May 7, 1948, the road was extended northeast 46.9 miles (75.5 km) to the Dawson, Gaines, and Martin County lines. On January 27, 1949, the road was extended to Lamesa. On July 14, 1949, the road was corrected to end at SH 349 at Patricia. On October 21, 1952, FM 703 was signed (but not designated) as part of SH 115. FM 703 was cancelled on August 29, 1990, as the SH 115 designation became official.

== FM 704 ==
Farm to Market Road 704
- Location: Jones County
- Length: 3.073 mi (4.946 km)
- Existed: January 22, 1947–present

Farm to Market Road 704 (FM 704) is located in Jones County. It runs from SH 6 southwest of Stamford east and north to FM 142.

FM 704 was designated on January 22, 1947, from US 380 (now SH 6) southeast of Stamford to Stamford Airport. On October 31, 1958, the road was extended east and north to FM 142.

== FM 705 ==
Farm to Market Road 705
- Location: San Augustine County
- Length: 22.367 mi (35.996 km)
- Existed: September 17, 1946–present

Farm to Market Road 705 (FM 705) is located in San Augustine County. It runs from SH 147 in Macune southeast to Sam Rayburn Reservoir.

FM 705 was designated on September 17, 1946, to run from FM 10 (now SH 147) southward 3.3 miles (5.3 km). On January 27, 1949, the road was extended south 7.9 miles (12.7 km) to Massie School (near FM 83). On May 23, 1951, the road was extended south 3.0 miles (4.8 km) to a road intersection. On April 24, 1953, the road was extended southeast 7.2 miles (11.6 km) to another road intersection. On October 15, 1954, the road was extended east to US 96 (now SL 149) in Brookeland. On July 25, 1965, a section was inundated by Sam Rayburn Reservoir, so the road was truncated to end at the reservoir, and the section east of the reservoir was redesignated as Spur 165. Also, the road was rerouted around the reservoir from north of FM 83 to south of FM 83; the old route is now known as "Old FM 705".

Junction list

The entire route is in San Augustine County.

Location	mi	km	Destinations	Notes
	0.0	0.0	County Road 464	
	0.9	1.4	FM 3127 south	
	12.0	19.3	FM 83 – Broaddus, Pineland	
	20.8	33.5	SH 103 – Lufkin, Bronson	
	22.4	36.0	SH 147	
1.000 mi = 1.609 km; 1.000 km = 0.621 mi

== FM 706 ==
Farm to Market Road 706
- Location: Angelina County
- Length: 6.960 mi (11.201 km)
- Existed: February 14, 1947–present

Farm to Market Road 706 (FM 706) is located in Angelina County. It runs from SH 94, approximately 4.3 miles west of Lufkin to US 69. There is a concurrency with SH 103.

FM 706 was designated on February 14, 1947, to run from SH 94 north to SH 103. The road was extended north to US 69 on May 6, 1964, creating the concurrency with SH 103.

== FM 707 ==
Farm to Market Road 707
- Location: Jones and Taylor counties
- Length: 34.502 mi (55.526 km)
- Existed: December 10, 1946–present

Farm to Market Road 707 (FM 707) is located in Jones and Taylor counties. It runs from US 83 south of Anson to I-20 in Tye. It runs to the west of Dyess Air Force Base.

FM 707 was designated on December 10, 1946, from the east boundary of Camp Barkley east to US 83. It had been War Highway 7. On May 23, 1951, the road was extended north 2.7 miles (4.3 km) to a junction with FM 708. On July 11, 1951, the road was extended to the Jones County line, replacing FM 708. On November 20, 1951, the road was extended to FM 605. On February 20, 1952, the road was extended north to US 83, replacing FM 1227 and creating a concurrency with FM 605. On November 24, 1959, the road was extended east 2.5 miles (4.0 km) to FM 1750. On January 31, 1973, a spur connection to US 83 and US 84 was added. On June 27, 1995, the section from I-20 to FM 1750 (along with the spur connection) was redesignated Urban Road 707 (UR 707). The designation of this section reverted to FM 707 with the elimination of the Urban Road system on November 15, 2018.

Junction list

County	Location	mi	km	Destinations	Notes
Taylor	Abilene	0.0	0.0	FM 1750	
Taylor	Abilene	1.6	2.6	FM Spur 707 west	
Taylor	Abilene	2.2	3.5	US 83 / US 84 – Coleman, Anson	
Taylor	Abilene	4.8	7.7	FM 89 (Buffalo Gap Road) – Buffalo Gap	
Taylor	Caps	9.2	14.8	US 277 – San Angelo, Abilene	
Taylor	Tye	15.5	24.9	I-20 BL (North Street)	former US 80
Taylor	Tye	15.6	25.1	I-20 / US 84 – Sweetwater, Abilene	I-20 exit 277
Jones		22.5	36.2	FM 605 west	South end of FM 605 overlap
Jones		24.2	38.9	FM 605 east – Hawley	North end of FM 605 overlap
Jones		27.5	44.3	FM 1812 north – Noodle	
Jones		34.8	56.0	FM 2746 west	South end of FM 2746 overlap
Jones		34.9	56.2	FM 2746 east	North end of FM 2746 overlap
Jones	Anson	36.1	58.1	US 83 / US 277 – Anson, Abilene	
1.000 mi = 1.609 km; 1.000 km = 0.621 mi: Concurrency terminus

== FM 708 ==
Farm to Market Road 708
- Location: Bosque County
- Length: 8.771 mi (14.116 km)
- Existed: July 25, 1951–present

Farm to Market Road 708 (FM 708) is located in Bosque County. It runs from FM 219 near Clifton southeast to FM 56 near Cayote.

FM 708 was designated on July 25, 1951, on the current route.

=== FM 708 (1946) ===
Farm to Market Road 708
- Location: Taylor County
- Existed: December 10, 1946–July 11, 1951

A previous route numbered FM 708 was designated on December 10, 1946, from US 80 (now I-20) at Tye to SH 158 at Caps. It had been War Highway 21. On July 14, 1949, the road was extended north to the Jones County line. FM 708 was cancelled on July 11, 1951 and became a portion of FM 707.

== FM 709 ==
Farm to Market Road 709
- Location: Navarro County
- Length: 36.187 mi (58.237 km)
- Existed: February 20, 1947–present

Farm to Market Road 709 (FM 709) is located in Navarro County. It runs from SH 31 in Corsicana to SH 31 west of Dawson. There is a brief concurrency with SH 31 in Dawson.

FM 709 was designated on February 20, 1947, from SH 31 at Dawson via Pickett to an intersection with SH 31 in Corsicana along the old route of SH 31. On November 10, 1947, the road was extended north to a rerouted SH 31, replacing Spur 138. On October 29, 1962, the road was extended north from SH 31, creating a concurrency with SH 31 and replacing a section of FM 639. On June 1, 1965, the road was extended west and south 7.8 miles (12.6 km) to its current terminus at SH 31.

== FM 710 ==
Farm to Market Road 710
- Location: Wharton and Jackson counties
- Length: 9.995 mi (16.085 km)
- Existed: December 10, 1946–present

Farm to Market Road 710 (FM 710) is located in Jackson and Wharton Counties. It runs from Loop 522 Ganado north to a point 0.2 mi north of the Jackson/Wharton County Line.

FM 710 was designated on December 10, 1946, to run from US 59 (now SL 522) in Ganado north 4.5 miles (7.2 km) to a road intersection. On July 11, 1968, the road was extended north 2.2 miles (3.5 km). On November 5, 1971, the road was extended north to the Jackson/Wharton County Line. On July 31, 1972, the road was extended north 0.2 miles (0.32 km) into Jackson County, completing its current route.

== FM 711 ==
Farm to Market Road 711
- Location: San Augustine and Shelby counties
- Length: 19.996 mi (32.180 km)
- Existed: May 23, 1951–present

Farm to Market Road 711 (FM 711) is located in San Augustine and Shelby counties. It runs from US 96 at San Augustine to SH 7 southwest of Center.

FM 711 was designated on May 23, 1951, from the new location of US 96 near San Augustine northwest 4.1 miles (6.6 km) to a road intersection. On August 24, 1955, the road was extended northwest 3.5 miles (5.6 km) to a road intersection. On October 31, 1958, the road was extended 4.4 miles (7.1 km) miles to the Shelby County line. On November 28, 1958, the 9.3 miles (15.0 km)-mile FM 1821 was combined, extending the road to SH 7.

=== FM 711 (1946) ===
Farm to Market Road 711
- Location: Falls County
- Existed: December 10, 1946–December 10, 1946

A previous route numbered FM 711 was designated on December 10, 1946, from SH 139 (now SH 7) at or near Chilton to Satin. FM 711 was cancelled once it was completed.

== FM 712 ==
Farm to Market Road 712
- Location: Falls County
- Length: 5.728 mi (9.218 km)
- Existed: December 19, 1959–present

Farm to Market Road 712 (FM 712) is located in Falls County. The highway begins at FM 2027, crosses the Brazos River and ends at Bus. SH 6 south of Marlin.

FM 712 begins at a four-way intersection with FM 2027 about 5.0 miles (8.0 km) northeast of Lott. The continuation of the road to the southwest, which ends in Lott, is called Falls Road. From its start point, FM 712 goes east-northeast a distance of 2.6 miles (4.2 km) to a bridge over the Brazos River. There is a county park and historical marker on the east side of the bridge that commemorates Sarahville de Viesca, the short-lived capital of Robertson's Colony. FM 712 intersects with County Road 301 0.4 miles (0.6 km) past the bridge where it changes direction to the northeast. The highway passes County Road 302 on the left and the William P. Hobby Unit, a state prison for women, on the right. Continuing northeast, FM 712 crosses a railroad and intersects with County Road 287. The highway passes County Road 285 and ends at Loop 23 about 0.9 miles (1.4 km) south of the Marlin city limit. The highway is two lanes wide for its entire length.

The designation of FM 712 in its current location occurred on December 19, 1959. It was a rerouting and a renumbering of part of FM 147. The highway started at SH 6 south of Marlin and continued 2.9 miles (4.7 km) southwest to a road junction. On November 15, 1973, FM 712 was extended an additional 3.2 miles (5.1 km) to FM 2027 at Carter Munsch Church. On November 30, 1978, the highway's designation was altered to start at FM 2027, go northeast, and end at Loop 23 (now Bus. SH 6) south of Marlin.

=== FM 712 (1946) ===
Farm to Market Road 712
- Location: Falls County
- Existed: December 10, 1946–December 10, 1946

The first use of the FM 712 designation was on December 10, 1946, from FM 107 (now SH 7) at or near Mooreville north 1.5 miles (2.4 km) toward Cottonwood. This route was cancelled once it was completed.

=== FM 712 (1951–1958) ===
Farm to Market Road 712
- Location: Hill County
- Existed: May 23, 1951–November 26, 1958

The next use of the FM 712 designation was on May 23, 1951, from US 81 in Itasca northeast 5.2 miles (8.4 km). On December 17, 1951, the western terminus was moved to FM 66 though the highway had the same mileage. On December 17, 1952, the road was extended 4.1 miles (6.6 km) to US 81. FM 712 was cancelled on November 26, 1958, and transferred to FM 67.

== FM 713 ==
Farm to Market Road 713
- Location: Bastrop and Caldwell counties
- Length: 19.517 mi (31.410 km)
- Existed: May 1, 1947–present

Farm to Market Road 713 (FM 713) is located in Bastrop and Caldwell counties. It runs from FM 20 east to FM 1296 in Jeddo.

FM 713 was designated on May 1, 1947, to run from FM 86 at McMahan southeast to Delhi (at what became SH 304); this resulted in part of FM 672 being cancelled. On June 21, 1951, the road was extended west to FM 20. On September 5, 1973, the road was extended east to the Caldwell/Bastrop County Line. On August 29, 1974, the road was extended to FM 1296, completing its current route.

== FM 714 ==
Farm to Market Road 714
- Location: McCulloch County
- Length: 1.858 mi (2.990 km)
- Existed: April 30, 1947–present

Farm to Market Road 714 (FM 714) is located in McCulloch County. It runs from US 87/US 190/US 377 east to a county road.

FM 714 was designated on April 30, 1947, to run from Brady eastward to the State School for Delinquent Colored Girls. The description was later corrected so that the east end was at a county road, putting the road on its current route. On October 29, 1992, the road was rerouted to go northeast to US 190. On March 30, 1995, the road was rerouted back to its previous route, as the city of Brady did not agree to the proposed rerouting (they later agreed to it as a different farm to market road, FM 3533, on July 27, 2000).

== FM 715 ==
Farm to Market Road 715
- Location: Midland County
- Length: 5.368 mi (8.639 km)
- Existed: April 30, 1947–present

Farm to Market Road 715 (FM 715) is located in Midland County. It runs from SH 140 south 5.3 miles (8.5 km) to FM 1213.

FM 715 was designated on April 30, 1947, from SH 158 (now SH 140), 2 miles (3.2 km) south of Midland, south 5.5 miles (8.9 km).

== FM 716 ==
Farm to Market Road 716
- Location: Duval and Jim Wells counties
- Length: 27.244 mi (43.845 km)
- Existed: August 1, 1947–present

Farm to Market Road 716 (FM 716) is located in Duval and Jim Wells counties. It runs from SH 359 in Realitas east to Business US 281 in Premont. There is a concurrency with FM 1329.

FM 716 was designated on August 1, 1947, to run from Business US 281 west to the Duval/Jim Wells County Line. On September 21, 1955, the road was extended west to SH 359, completing its current route.

== FM 717 ==
Farm to Market Road 717
- Location: Eastland and Stephens counties
- Length: 29.552 mi (47.559 km)
- Existed: September 9, 1947–present

Farm to Market Road 717 (FM 717) is located in Eastland and Stephens counties. It runs from FM 101 in Ranger to SH 67 south of Ivan.

FM 717 was designated on September 9, 1947, to run from US 180 in Caddo to US 80 in Ranger (though it was constructed to end at FM 101 instead of US 80). On October 31, 1957, the road was extended north 3.5 miles (5.6 km) to a road intersection. On October 31, 1958, the road was extended north 5.5 miles (8.9 km) to another road intersection. On November 24, 1959, the road was extended north 2.4 miles (3.9 km) to SH 67, completing its current route.

== FM 718 ==
Farm to Market Road 718
- Location: Tarrant and Wise counties
- Length: 10.523 mi (16.935 km)
- Existed: September 9, 1947–present

Farm to Market Road 718 (FM 718) is located in Tarrant and Wise counties.

The highway begins in northwestern Fort Worth in the Avondale area. FM 718's southern terminus is at US 81/US 287/Bus. US 287. The highway travels northwest through Newark, passing just east of Lake Worth. FM 718's northern terminus is at an intersection with SH 114 in Aurora.

FM 718 was designated on September 9, 1947, on the current route.

Junction list

County	Location	mi	km	Destinations	Notes
Tarrant	Fort Worth	0.0	0.0	US 81 / US 287 / Bus. US 287 south	
Tarrant	Newark	3.1	5.0	FM 1220 south – Lake Worth	
Wise	Newark	4.6	7.4	FM 3433 north – Rhome	
Wise	Aurora	10.5	16.9	SH 114 – Boyd, Rhome	
1.000 mi = 1.609 km; 1.000 km = 0.621 mi

== FM 719 ==
Farm to Market Road 719
- Location: Karnes County
- Length: 0.927 mi (1,492 m)
- Existed: July 17, 1954–present

Farm to Market Road 719 (FM 719) is located in Karnes County. It runs from US 181 north of Kenedy east to FM 792.

FM 719 was designated on July 17, 1954, on the current route.

=== FM 719 (1947) ===
Farm to Market Road 719
- Location: Jackson County
- Existed: September 9, 1947–January 16, 1953

A previous route numbered FM 719 was designated on September 9, 1947, from US 59, 2.5 miles (4.0 km) east of Edna, north through Cordele at a total distance of 16.0 miles (25.7 km). On December 17, 1952, the road was extended north to the Lavaca County line. FM 719 was cancelled on January 16, 1953, and transferred to FM 530.

== FM 720 ==
Farm to Market Road 720
- Location: Denton County
- Length: 9.625 mi (15.490 km)
- Existed: October 17, 1947–present

Farm to Market Road 720 (FM 720) is located in Denton County.

FM 720 is a suburban road that begins at US 380 just west of the Lincoln Park town limits. It travels southward, through Oak Point, before turning to the southeast and entering Little Elm. It merges onto eastbound El Dorado Parkway, while the Parkway westbound connects with the Lewisville Lake Toll Bridge and the city of Lake Dallas. The route continues northeast and east, as the main thoroughfare through Little Elm. In eastern Little Elm, El Dorado Parkway branches off to the north, while FM 720 continues east to its terminus at FM 423.

FM 720 was first designated in neighboring Collin County on October 17, 1947; it replaced an old alignment of SH 24 between SH 289 and US 75, connecting Frisco and McKinney. On September 9, 1955, the route was extended into Denton County, to the new alignment of SH 24 (which would become US 380 in 1977), replacing FM 388 from SH 24 to FM 423 and portions of FM 423 from Old SH 24 to FM 388. On June 30, 1958, the section from US 75 east to SH 5 was cancelled. The route was truncated on August 30, 2001, when the portion from FM 2478 to US 75 was mostly removed from the state highway system. On January 31, 2002, a segment in east Frisco between SH 289 and FM 2478 was retained on the system and redesignated as FM 3537, while the section from FM 423 to SH 289 was removed from the state highway system.

Junction list

The entire route is in Little Elm, Denton County.

mi	km	Destinations	Notes
0.0	0.0	US 380 – Denton, McKinney	
4.7	7.6	West Eldorado Parkway to Lewisville Lake Toll Bridge – Lakewood Village	
5.2– 5.7	8.4– 9.2	Bridge over Lake Lewisville	
9.6	15.4	FM 423	
1.000 mi = 1.609 km; 1.000 km = 0.621 mi

== FM 721 ==
Farm to Market Road 721
- Location: Moore County
- Length: 0.519 mi (835 m)
- Existed: September 9, 1947–present

Farm to Market Road 721 (FM 721) is located in Moore County. It runs from FM 119 northeast of Dumas to the Panhandle Eastern Pumping Station.

FM 721 was designated on September 9, 1947, on the current route.

== FM 722 ==
Farm to Market Road 722
- Location: Moore and Hartley counties
- Length: 24.738 mi (39.812 km)
- Existed: September 9, 1947–present

Farm to Market Road 722 (FM 722) is located in Moore and Hartley counties. It runs from US 87/287 in Dumas southwest to US 385 north Channing.

FM 722 was designated on September 9, 1947, to run from Dumas southeast to the Moore/Hartley County Line. On December 17, 1947, the road was extended southwest to SH 51 (now US 385), completing its current route.

== FM 723 ==
Farm to Market Road 723
- Location: Fort Bend County
- Length: 9.581 mi (15.419 km)
- Existed: August 1, 1947–present

Farm to Market Road 723 (FM 723) is located in Fort Bend County. The highway begins at U.S. Route 90 Alternate (US 90 Alt.) and SH 36 in Rosenberg, goes directly north and ends at FM 1093 south of Katy.

FM 723 starts at the intersection of US 90 Alt. (Avenue H) and SH 36 (First Street) in Rosenberg and heads north on First Street. After one block, FM 723 crosses over multiple railroad tracks via the John H. Arredondo Bridge. On the north side of the bridge, there is a traffic signal at Avenue D. The highway, which is also called Houston Street, goes past Brazos Park and crosses the Brazos River by a bridge 0.5 miles (0.8 km) north of its starting point. Leaving the river behind, FM 723 passes through a rural landscape with an occasional subdivision. At a distance 4.0 miles (6.4 km) from the start, there are three school buildings belonging to the Lamar Consolidated Independent School District on the east side of the highway. From south to north, these are Werthimer Middle School, Briscoe Junior High School and John and Randolph Foster High School. There is a state historical marker in front of the high school. After passing the schools, FM 723 intersects with FM 359 at a traffic light 4.9 miles (7.9 km) from its start. The highway crosses Jones Creek 0.4 miles (0.6 km) north of FM 359 and proceeds an additional 3.3 miles (5.3 km) to a traffic signal at Bellaire Boulevard and Fulshear-Gaston Road. After another 0.8 miles (1.3 km), FM 723 ends at a traffic light at FM 1093. The continuation of the road north into a suburban area is called Spring Green Boulevard.

FM 723 was designated on August 1, 1947, to start from Rosenberg and run about 5.2 miles (8.4 km) north to FM 359. On June 1, 1965, the highway was extended about 4.8 miles (7.7 km) from FM 359 to FM 1093. The intersection with FM 1093 was 2.0 miles (3.2 km) east of FM 1463.

Junction list

The entire route is in Fort Bend County.

Location	mi	km	Destinations	Notes
Rosenberg			US 90 Alt. (Avenue H) / SH 36 (1st Street)	
			FM 359 – Pecan Grove	
			FM 1093 (Westheimer Road) to Westpark Tollway	
1.000 mi = 1.609 km; 1.000 km = 0.621 mi

== FM 724 ==
Farm to Market Road 724
- Location: Smith County
- Length: 9.391 mi (15.113 km)
- Existed: September 9, 1947–present

Farm to Market Road 724 (FM 724) is located in Smith County. It runs from SH 110 in Mt Sylvan to SH 64 near Dixie School Community.

FM 724 was designated on September 9, 1947, on the current route.

== FM 725 ==
Farm to Market Road 725
- Location: Comal and Guadalupe counties
- Length: 16.099 mi (25.909 km)
- Existed: September 9, 1947–present

Farm to Market Road 725 (FM 725) is located in Comal and Guadalupe counties. It is 16.1 miles (25.9 km) in length.

FM 725 begins at an intersection with FM 467 in south Seguin, near its junction with Bus. SH 123. The route travels west to an intersection with SH 46 before leaving Seguin and making a dogleg to the north-northwest. Just outside the Seguin city limits, FM 725 intersects US 90 and has a junction with I-10 at its exit 604. The route has a brief concurrency with FM 78 in McQueeney before resuming a northward direction and passing Lake McQueeney before entering New Braunfels. In New Braunfels, FM 725 (known as Seguin Avenue) has a junction with I-35 at its exit 187. The FM 725 designation ends at an intersection with Business I-35/Bus. SH 46, the former route of US 81 in New Braunfels.

FM 725 was designated in Guadalupe County on September 9, 1947, from FM 78 in McQueeney to the Comal County line. On December 16, 1948, the designation was extended into Comal County, to US 81 in New Braunfels. The southward extension from FM 78 to US 90 occurred on December 11, 1961, replacing FM 2723. The route was lengthened to the south, to Leissner Road (the location of the current dogleg in the route west of Seguin), on January 5, 1971. The extension to the current southern terminus at FM 467 was made on November 3, 1972.

The designation indicates a break in FM 725 at FM 78; however, signage in the area indicates a concurrency.

Junction list

County	Location	mi	km	Destinations	Notes
Guadalupe	Seguin			FM 467 – La Vernia	
Guadalupe	Seguin			SH 46 – New Braunfels, Stockdale	
Guadalupe				US 90 – San Antonio, Seguin	
Guadalupe	Seguin			I-10 – San Antonio, Houston	I-10 exit 604
Guadalupe	McQueeney			FM 78 west – Marion	South end of FM 78 overlap
Guadalupe	McQueeney			FM 78 east – Seguin	North end of FM 78 overlap
Comal	New Braunfels			I-35 – San Antonio, San Marcos	I-35 exit 187
Comal	New Braunfels			I-35 BL (Elliot Knox Boulevard) / Bus. SH 46 west (Seguin Avenue)	
1.000 mi = 1.609 km; 1.000 km = 0.621 mi: Concurrency terminus

== FM 726 ==
Farm to Market Road 726
- Location: Marion, Harrison, and Upshur counties
- Length: 29.601 mi (47.638 km)
- Existed: October 25, 1947–present

Farm to Market Road 726 (FM 726) is located in Marion, Harrison, and Upshur counties. It runs from FM 729 near French Creek to US 271.

FM 726 was designated on October 25, 1947, from SH 49, 3 miles (4.8 km) northwest of Jefferson, southwest 6.0 miles (9.7 km). On November 18, 1953, a 1.6-mile (2.6 km) section was transferred to FM 729. By February 15, 1957, the road was extended west along the Ferrells Bridge Dam to FM 450, replacing the short-lived FM 2456. On September 27, 1960, the road was extended west 3.5 miles (5.6 km) from FM 450 to a road intersection, creating a concurrency with FM 450. On June 28, 1963, the road was extended southwest to US 271, replacing FM 1973 and creating concurrencies with SH 154 and FM 1650. On September 30, 1964, the northern terminus was relocated, shortening the route by 1.6 miles (2.6 km).

== FM 727 ==
Farm to Market Road 727
- Location: Marion County
- Length: 6.322 mi (10.174 km)
- Existed: October 25, 1947–present

Farm to Market Road 727 (FM 727) is located in Marion County. It runs from SH 49 southeast of Smithland south to Caddo Lake.

FM 727 was designated on October 25, 1947, on the current route.

== FM 728 ==
Farm to Market Road 728
- Location: Marion County
- Length: 3.636 mi (5.852 km)
- Existed: October 25, 1947–present

Farm to Market Road 728 (FM 728) is located in Marion County. It runs from SH 49, 1.5 miles (2.4 km) northwest of Jefferson, to Berea.

FM 728 was designated on October 25, 1947, on the current route.

== FM 729 ==
Farm to Market Road 729
- Location: Morris and Marion counties
- Length: 22.312 mi (35.908 km)
- Existed: October 25, 1947–present

Farm to Market Road 729 (FM 729) is located in Morris and Marion counties. It runs from US 259 at the Lone Star Steel Plant southeast to SH 49 near Jefferson.

FM 729 was designated on October 25, 1947, from FM 726 northwest of Jefferson west 7.5 miles (12.1 km). On July 15, 1949, the road was extended to the new location of SH 155. On November 20, 1951, the road was extended northwest 5.5 miles (8.9 km) miles to SH 26 (now US 259). On November 18, 1953, the road was extended southeast to SH 49, replacing a section of FM 726.

== FM 730 ==
Farm to Market Road 730
- Location: Parker, Tarrant, Wise, and Montague counties
- Length: 57.872 mi (93.136 km)
- Existed: September 9, 1947–present

Farm to Market Road 730 (FM 730) is a two-lane route connecting various farming areas of Montague, Wise, Parker, and Tarrant counties. FM 730 terminates at FM 455 near Forestburg in Montague County at its northern end and at US 180 in Weatherford at its southern end.

FM 730 was designated On September 9, 1947, from SH 199 at Azle to the Wise County line. On May 23, 1951, the road was extended north to SH 114 at Boyd. On February 6, 1953, the road was extended north to SH 24 (now US 380), replacing FM 1882. On November 21, 1956, the road was extended north 7.4 miles (11.9 km) to a road intersection and a gap was added at Boyd. On June 2, 1967, the road was extended northeast 6.4 miles (10.3 km) to a road intersection. On September 5, 1973, the road was extended northeast 3.5 miles (5.6 km) to the Montague County line. On October 26, 1983, a section from FM 455 to the Wise County line was added. On December 20, 1984, the road was extended southwest to US 80 (now US 180), replacing FM 1707.

Junction list

County	Location	mi	km	Destinations	Notes
Parker	Weatherford			US 180 – Mineral Wells, Fort Worth	Former US 80
Parker				FM 1886 east – Lakeside, Lake Worth	
Parker	Azle			Loop 344 (Main Street)	
Parker	Azle			SH 199 west – Jacksboro	South end of SH 199 overlap
Tarrant	Azle			SH 199 east – Fort Worth, Lake Worth	North end of SH 199 overlap
Tarrant	Azle			FM 1542 west (Reno Road) – Reno	
Tarrant				FM 2257 south (Knob Hill Road)	
Wise	Briar			FM 2048 west	
Wise	Boyd			SH 114 west – Bridgeport	South end of SH 114 overlap
Wise	Boyd			SH 114 east – Rhome	North end of SH 114 overlap
Wise	Decatur			US 81 / US 287 – Bowie, Fort Worth	Interchange
Wise	Decatur			FM 51 south – Springtown	South end of FM 51 overlap
Wise	Decatur			FM 51 north – Gainesville	North end of FM 51 overlap
Wise	Decatur			Bus. US 81 / Bus. US 287 / Bus. US 380	
Wise	Decatur			US 380 – Bridgeport, Denton	Interchange
Montague				FM 455 – Forestburg, Sanger	
1.000 mi = 1.609 km; 1.000 km = 0.621 mi: Concurrency terminus

== FM 731 ==
Farm to Market Road 731
- Location: Johnson and Tarrant counties
- Length: 15.332 mi (24.674 km)
- Existed: 1947–present

Farm to Market Road 731 (FM 731) runs from FM 917 just south of Burleson to Interstate 20 in southern Fort Worth.

FM 731 begins at an intersection with FM 917 south of Burleson and east of Joshua. The highway travels north to Burleson, running along the city's eastern border. FM 731 enters Crowley, intersecting with Farm to Market Road 1187 and runs through the center of the city. Development along the highway becomes more sparse before entering Fort Worth at Risinger Road. FM 731 runs through a heavily developed area of the city's southside before ending at Interstate 20.

FM 731 was designated on September 9, 1947, from the then-proposed Fort Worth Southwest Loop south to Crowley. On October 26, 1950, FM 731 was extended north to US 81 at Kellis Street. On October 13, 1954, FM 731 was extended west and south to FM 917. On November 22, 1955, the section west of FM 1187 became part of FM 1187, and the section south of FM 1187 was renumbered FM 1902. On August 11, 1958, the section from I-820 (now I-20) to US 81 was cancelled. On May 6, 1964, FM 731 was extended south to FM 917, replacing FM 2233 and FM 2035. On June 27, 1995, the section SH 174 to I-20 was redesignated Urban Road 731 (UR 731). The designation of this section reverted to FM 731 with the elimination of the Urban Road system on November 15, 2018.

Junction list

County	Location	mi	km	Destinations	Notes
Johnson		0.0	0.0	FM 917 – Joshua	
Johnson	Burleson	4.5	7.2	SH 174 (SW Wilshire Boulevard) – Cleburne	
Tarrant	Crowley	8.3	13.4	FM 1187 (Crowley-Plover Road)	
Tarrant	Crowley	9.2	14.8	FM Bus. 1187 (Main Street)	
Tarrant	Fort Worth	15.3	24.6	I-20 (Southwest Loop 820)	I-20 exit 436A
1.000 mi = 1.609 km; 1.000 km = 0.621 mi

== FM 732 ==
Farm to Market Road 732
- Location: Cameron County
- Length: 6.021 mi (9.690 km)
- Existed: September 9, 1947–present

Farm to Market Road 732 (FM 732) is located in Cameron County. It runs from US 281 in La Paloma to Bus. US 77 and FM 510 in San Benito.

FM 732 was designated on September 9, 1947, from US 77/US 83 (now US 77), 2 miles (3.2 km) southeast of San Benito, southwest 1.5 miles (2.4 km) to a paved road and from US 77/US 83, 1.5 miles (2.4 km) southeast of San Benito, northeast 2.0 miles (3.2 km) to a paved road. On July 15, 1949, the road was extended 4.8 miles (7.7 km) to La Paloma and 7.9 miles (12.7 km) to FM 1847 on December 17, 1952. On October 15, 1954, the section from US 83 to FM 1847 became a portion of FM 510. On December 16, 2004, FM 732 was rerouted: a section from the intersection of FM 1577 to 0.3 miles (0.48 km) east of the intersection was redesignated as FM 1577, FM 732 designated along a new route from Iowa Gardens to old FM 732, a 1.3-mile (2.1 km) section from US 77 to FM 1577 and a 0.3-mile (0.48 km) section from FM 1577 to 0.3 miles (0.48 km) east of FM 1577 returned to the county, a 0.2-mile (0.32 km) section from 0.3 miles (0.48 km) east of FM 1577 to 0.5 miles (0.80 km) east of FM 1577 was removed altogether and FM 732 routed over FM 510 to Bus. US 77. On April 30, 2011, the 2004 rerouting was revised: a section of old FM 732 from FM 1577 to 0.3 miles (0.48 km) southwest of FM 1577 was redesignated as FM 1577, the section from FM 1577 to 0.3 miles (0.48 km) east of FM 1577 was restored and a 0.4-mile (0.64 km) section of old FM 732 from 0.3 miles (0.48 km) southwest of FM 1577 to 0.7 miles (1.1 km) southwest of FM 1577 was removed altogether.

== FM 733 ==
Farm to Market Road 733
- Location: Cameron County
- Length: 3.229 mi (5.197 km)
- Existed: September 9, 1947–present

Farm to Market Road 733 (FM 733) is located in Cameron County. It runs from Bus. US 83 east of La Feria north to Tio Cano Lake Cross Road.

FM 733 was designated on September 9, 1947, on the current route.

== FM 734 ==
Farm to Market Road 734
- Location: Travis and Williamson counties
- Length: 19.284 mi (31.035 km)
- Existed: April 25, 1978–present

Farm to Market Road 734 (FM 734) is located in Travis and Williamson counties. It runs from US 290 in Austin to RM 1431 in Cedar Park.

=== FM/RM 734 (1947) ===
Ranch to Market Road 734
- Location: McCulloch, Mason, San Saba, and Llano counties
- Existed: November 18, 1947 (Note: RM 734 was previously designated as FM 734 from 1947 to 1961.)–September 1, 1965

A previous route numbered FM 734 was designated on November 18, 1947, from US 87 at Brady southeast via Voca to the Mason County line. On October 29, 1948, the road was extended southeast to FM 386 at Fredonia. On May 28, 1952, the road was extended southeast to SH 29 northwest of Llano, replacing a section of FM 386 (now RM 386). On May 22, 1958, the route was rerouted out of Voca, shortening the route by 0.1 mile. On April 30, 1959, the western terminus was relocated south of Brady and the former route was transferred to FM 2309. On March 16, 1961, FM 734 was redesignated Ranch to Market 734 (RM 734). RM 734 was cancelled on September 1, 1965, and transferred to SH 71, though signage was not changed until January 1, 1966.

== FM 735 ==
Farm to Market Road 735
- Location: Jim Wells County
- Length: 9.744 mi (15.681 km)
- Existed: September 9, 1947–present

Farm to Market Road 735 (FM 735) is located in Jim Wells County. It runs from US 281 south of Alice to the Duval County Line.

FM 735 was designated on September 9, 1947, on the current route.

== FM 736 ==
Farm to Market Road 736
- Location: Orange County
- Length: 0.298 mi (480 m)
- Existed: September 27, 1960–present

Farm to Market Road 736 (FM 736) is located in Orange County. It runs from FM 3247 (originally FM 1134, then FM 1130) east 0.3 miles (0.48 km).

FM 736 was designated on September 27, 1960, along the current route.

=== FM 736 (1947) ===
Farm to Market Road 736
- Location: Jim Wells and Nueces counties
- Existed: September 9, 1947–November 2, 1955

A previous route numbered FM 736 was designated in Jim Wells County on September 9, 1947, from Alice east to the Nueces County line. On July 14, 1949, the road was extended east 1.9 miles (3.1 km) to what became part of FM 70 on May 23, 1951. FM 736 was cancelled on November 2, 1955, and transferred to FM 665; signage was not changed until the publication of the 1956 travel map.

== FM 737 ==
Farm to Market Road 737 (FM 737) is a designation that has been used twice. No highway currently uses the FM 737 designation.

=== FM 737 (1947–1949) ===
Farm to Market Road 737
- Location: Jim Wells County
- Existed: September 9, 1947–January 27, 1949

The first route numbered FM 737 was designated on September 9, 1947, from US 59 (now SH 359) at Alfred west to US 281. The county was unable to secure the right of way for FM 737 and it was cancelled 18 months later.

=== FM 737 (1951–1971) ===
Farm to Market Road 737
- Location: Hill and Limestone counties
- Existed: May 23, 1951–July 15, 1971

The second route numbered FM 737 was designated on May 23, 1951, from FM 308 near Birome to SH 31 at Mount Calm. On November 13, 1953, the road was extended to FM 73 at Prairie Hill, replacing FM 1662 and creating a concurrency with SH 31. On December 3, 1954, the road was extended southeast to US 84, creating a concurrency with FM 73. On June 2, 1967, the road was extended northwest to FM 2114. FM 737 was cancelled on July 15, 1971, and combined with FM 339.

== FM 738 ==
Farm to Market Road 738
- Location: Jim Wells County
- Length: 7.805 mi (12.561 km)
- Existed: September 9, 1947–present

Farm to Market Road 738 (FM 738) is located in Jim Wells County. It runs from FM 534 south to Orange Grove and west.

FM 738 was designated on September 9, 1947, to run from FM 624 in Orange Grove north 2.9 miles (4.7 km). On September 28, 1949, the road was extended west 3.9 miles (6.3 km). On November 24, 1959, the road was extended north to FM 2287 (now FM 534).

== FM 739 ==
Farm to Market Road 739
- Location: Navarro County
- Length: 2.871 mi (4.620 km)
- Existed: September 21, 1955–present

Farm to Market Road 739 (FM 739) is located in Navarro County. It runs from I-45 in Angus to US 287.

FM 739 was designated on September 21, 1955, on the current route.

=== FM 739 (1947) ===
Farm to Market Road 739
- Location: Jim Wells County
- Existed: September 9, 1947–January 14, 1952

A previous route numbered FM 739 was designated on September 9, 1947, from US 59 at Sandia southeast to the Nueces County line. FM 739 was cancelled on January 14, 1952, and transferred to FM 70.

== FM 740 ==
Farm to Market Road 740
- Location: Kaufman and Rockwall counties
- Length: 19.657 mi (31.635 km)
- Existed: 1947–present

Farm to Market Road 740 (FM 740) is located in Kaufman and Rockwall counties.

FM 740 starts at the Kaufman-Dallas county line between Seagoville and Forney. The road continues south as Malloy Bridge Road, which runs to I-45 in Wilmer. There is no signage marking the end of FM 740, much less a sign noting the county line. FM 740 runs northeast to I-20 in the easternmost part of Mesquite. FM 740 makes two right angle turns just north of I-20. The first is at FM 548, where northbound traffic must turn right to continue on FM 740 and southbound traffic must stop. The second is about a 1/4 mile northwest of FM 548 at County Road 202.

The highway enters Forney as South Bois d' Arc Street. Near the town square 740 runs a short distance with FM 688 (an old alignment of US 80) before turning north on Pinson Road. FM 740 intersects US 80 before turning left, running out of Forney.

Entering Rockwall County, the highway enters Heath. 740 turns right at FM 1140, where the latter runs closer to the shore of Lake Ray Hubbard. FM 740 enters Rockwall, intersecting I-30 before terminating at SH 205.

FM 740 was designated on September 9, 1947, from the Rockwall County line across US 80 to the Dallas County line. On July 15, 1949, FM 740 was extended north to FM 550. On November 4, 1955, the section of FM 550 from FM 740 to US 67 was transferred to FM 740. On April 30, 1959, FM 740 replaced part of the old location of US 80, the rest on the east became a spur connection. The west section of old US 80 was removed from the system. On January 8, 1960, the section of FM 740 on old US 80 and FM 740 spur connection were redesignated as part of the new FM 688. On June 28, 1963, FM 740 was extended north to SH 205. On February 26, 1986, FM 740 was shifted to the west. The old route was cancelled and removed from the state highway system; this would be transferred to FM 548 in 1998. On June 27, 1995, the section from FM 1140 to SH 205 was redesignated Urban Road 740 (UR 740); the designation of this section reverted to FM 740 with the elimination of the Urban Road system on November 15, 2018. On February 22, 2018, the section from FM 688 to FM 741 was given to the city of Forney.

FM 740 in Heath is being widened from two lanes to four lanes. The 1.5-mile expansion is between FM 549 and FM 1140. The project was approved in 2012 with a budget of $12 million.

Junction list

County	Location	mi	km	Destinations	Notes
Dallas–Kaufman county line	Seagoville	0.0	0.0	Malloy Bridge Road – Seagoville	Southern terminus; continues south as Malloy Bridge Road
Kaufman	Mesquite	1.3	2.1	FM 2757 east	
Kaufman	Mesquite	1.4	2.3	I-20 – Dallas, Shreveport	I-20 exit 487
Kaufman		2.6	4.2	FM 548 north – Royse City	
Kaufman	Forney	5.3	8.5	FM 741 south (College Avenue) – Crandall	
Kaufman	Forney	5.8	9.3	FM 688 east (Broad Street) – Terrell	South end of FM 688 overlap
Kaufman	Forney	6.1	9.8	FM 688 west (Broad Street)	North end of FM 688 overlap
Kaufman	Forney	6.4	10.3	US 80 – Dallas, Terrell	Interchange
Kaufman		8.8	14.2	FM 460 west (Clements Drive) to US 80	
Rockwall	Heath	13.4	21.6	FM 1140 north (Smirl Drive)	
Rockwall	Heath	13.8	22.2	FM 549 north (Buffalo Way) / FM 550 east (McLendon Road) – McLendon-Chisholm	
Rockwall	Heath	15.2	24.5	FM 1140 south (Smirl Drive)	
Rockwall	Rockwall	17.5	28.2	FM 3097 south (Horizon Road)	
Rockwall	Rockwall	17.8	28.6	I-30 (US 67) – Dallas, Greenville	I-30 exit 67B
Rockwall	Rockwall	19.7	31.7	SH 205 (Goliad Street) – Rockwall, Terrell	Northern terminus
1.000 mi = 1.609 km; 1.000 km = 0.621 mi: Concurrency terminus

== FM 741 ==
Farm to Market Road 741
- Location: Kaufman County
- Length: 9.841 mi (15.838 km)
- Existed: 1947–present

Farm to Market Road 741 (FM 741) begins at an interchange with U.S. Route 175 in Crandall and runs to FM 740 in Forney. The section of road in Forney is known locally as College Avenue.

FM 741 was designated on September 9, 1947, on its current route. On February 26, 1986, FM 741 was extended north from old location FM 740 (now an extension of FM 548) to new location FM 740.

Junction list

The entire route is in Kaufman County.

Location	mi	km	Destinations	Notes
Crandall	0.0	0.0	US 175 – Seagoville, Kaufman	Interchange
	2.0	3.2	FM 2757 west	
	5.7	9.2	I-20 – Dallas, Shreveport	I-20 exit 490
	6.3	10.1	FM 2932 south	
Forney	8.5	13.7	FM 548 – Seagoville, Royse City	
Forney	9.9	15.9	FM 740 (South Bois d'Arc Street) – Seagoville, Rockwall	
1.000 mi = 1.609 km; 1.000 km = 0.621 mi

== FM 742 ==
Farm to Market Road 742
- Location: McLennan County
- Length: 0.175 mi (282 m)
- Existed: May 7, 1970–present

Farm to Market Road 742 (FM 742) is located in McLennan County in the eastern part of Waco and is part of Chappel Hill Road for its entire length. The southern terminus of FM 742 is at the northside frontage road of Loop 484. The route travels in a northeasterly direction on Chappel Hill Road for 0.175 miles (282 m) as a two-lane road, crossing a railroad track, before the FM 742 designation ends at an intersection with Old Marlin Road. Chappel Hill Road continues northeast for another 1.2 miles (1.9 km) under local jurisdiction to Loop 340.

FM 742 was designated on May 7, 1970, along the current route.

=== FM 742 (1947) ===
Farm to Market Road 742
- Location: Karnes County
- Existed: September 9, 1947–December 17, 1969

A previous route numbered FM 742 was designated in Karnes County on September 9, 1947, from FM 81, 3 miles (4.8 km) north of Runge, to a dead end point past a junction with Karnes County Road 317. This FM 742 was cancelled on December 17, 1969, and combined with FM 627.

== FM 743 ==
Farm to Market Road 743
- Location: Karnes County
- Length: 17.221 mi (27.715 km)
- Existed: September 9, 1947–present

Farm to Market Road 743 (FM 743) is located in Karnes County. It runs from BS 72-B in Kenedy southeast and southwest to US 181.

FM 743 was designated on September 9, 1947, to run from SH 72 (now BS 72-B) southeast 10 miles (16 km) to near Overby School. On November 23, 1948, the road was extended southwest to US 181, completing its current route.

== FM 744 ==
Farm to Market Road 744
- Location: Hill and Navarro counties
- Length: 27.278 mi (43.900 km)
- Existed: May 23, 1951–present

Farm to Market Road 744 (FM 744) is located in Hill and Navarro counties. It runs from SH 171 in Malone to SH 22 in Corsicana. There is a concurrency with FM 1126.

FM 744 was designated on May 23, 1951, to run from SH 171 northeast to the Hill/Navarro County Line near Pelham. On December 17, 1952, the road was extended northeast to FM 639. On October 29, 1962, the road was extended northeast to SH 22, replacing part of FM 639 and all of FM 918.

=== FM 744 (1947) ===
Farm to Market Road 744
- Location: Karnes County
- Existed: December 17, 1947–January 6, 1950

A previous route numbered FM 744 was designated on December 17, 1947, from US 181 at Hobson south 5.0 miles (8.0 km). On March 31, 1948, the section from Hobson to SH 123 was added. FM 744 was cancelled on January 6, 1950, and combined with FM 81.

== FM 745 ==
Farm to Market Road 745
- Location: Leon County
- Length: 0.444 mi (715 m)
- Existed: November 26, 1969–present

Farm to Market Road 745 (FM 745) is located in Leon County. It runs from SH 75 and Davis Street in Buffalo to near Buffalo Junior High School.

FM 745 was designated on November 26, 1969, on the current route.

=== FM 745 (1947) ===
Farm to Market Road 745
- Location: Bailey and Lamb counties
- Existed: September 9, 1947–September 30, 1968

A previous route numbered FM 745 was designated on September 9, 1947, from SH 214, 9 miles (14 km) south of Muleshoe, east to the Lamb County line. On December 17, 1952, the road was extended east 2.6 miles (4.2 km) to US 84. FM 745 was cancelled on September 30, 1968, and combined with FM 746.

== FM 746 ==
Farm to Market Road 746
- Location: Bailey and Lamb counties
- Length: 31.457 mi (50.625 km)
- Existed: September 9, 1947–present

Farm to Market Road 746 (FM 746) is located in Bailey and Lamb counties. It runs from the Texas/New Mexico State Line east to US 84. There is a concurrency with SH 214.

FM 746 was designated on September 9, 1947, to run from SH 214 west 5.5 miles (8.9 km). On January 27, 1948, the road was extended west 5.0 miles (8.0 km). On November 21, 1956, the road was extended south and west 6.0 miles (9.7 km). On October 31, 1957, the road was extended west to the Texas/New Mexico State Line. On September 30, 1968, the road was extended east to US 84, replacing FM 745.

== FM 747 ==
Farm to Market Road 747
- Location: Cherokee County
- Length: 21.03 mi (Note: The certified length given is shorter than the actual mileage, as the TxDOT description of FM 747 considers it to be discontinuous at rather than concurrent with US 79.) (33.84 km)
- Existed: 1947–present

Farm to Market Road 747 (FM 747) is located in Cherokee County. It runs about 21 miles (34 km) from an intersection with US 84 west of Maydelle, north to a multiplex west of Jacksonville, then west (but still signed north) to a county road east of the border with Anderson County. The route serves the communities of Pierces Chapel and New Hope.

FM 747 was designated on September 9, 1947, from US 79 in Jacksonville southwest 8.2 miles (13.2 km). On October 25, 1947, the route was extended southwest 0.9 miles (1.4 km). On July 14, 1949, it was extended south by 7.2 miles (11.6 km), to an intersection with US 84 west of Maydelle. The northern terminus was changed to another point on US 79 on August 29, 1957. On October 31, 1957, the route was extended 6.5 miles (10.5 km) westward from US 79.

Junction list

The entire route is in Cherokee County.

Location	mi	km	Destinations	Notes
	0.0	0.0	US 84 – Maydelle, Palestine	
	14.8	23.8	US 79 north – Jacksonville	South end of US 79 overlap
	15.2	24.5	US 79 south – Palestine	North end of US 79 overlap
	21.4	34.4	County Road 3315	
1.000 mi = 1.609 km; 1.000 km = 0.621 mi

== FM 748 ==
Farm to Market Road 748
- Location: Gray and Roberts counties
- Length: 10.465 mi (16.842 km)
- Existed: September 9, 1947–present

Farm to Market Road 748 (FM 748) runs from US 60/FM 282 to SH 152 in Gray and Roberts Counties.

FM 748 was designated on September 9, 1947, to run from SH 152 in Laketon north to the Gray/Roberts County Line. On December 17, 1947, the road was extended north to US 60/FM 282 in Miami, completing its current route.

== FM 749 ==
Farm to Market Road 749
- Location: Gray County
- Length: 12.738 mi (20.500 km)
- Existed: September 9, 1947–present

Farm to Market Road 749 (FM 749) runs from SH 70 to SH 273/Loop 171 in Gray County.

The highway was designated on September 9, 1947, running from SH 273 south of Pampa to Bowers City near the present day RM 2375 at a distance of 6.8 miles (10.9 km). FM 749 was extended 6.0 miles (9.7 km) south from Bowers City to SH 70 on July 14, 1949.

Junction list

The entire route is in Gray County.

Location	mi	km	Destinations	Notes
	0.0	0.0	SH 70 – Pampa, Clarendon	
Bowers City	6.0	9.7	RM 2375 east – Lefors	
	12.7	20.4	SH 273 / Loop 171 – Pampa, Lefors	
1.000 mi = 1.609 km; 1.000 km = 0.621 mi

== FM 750 ==
Farm to Market Road 750
- Location: Gray County
- Length: 2.265 mi (3.645 km)
- Existed: September 9, 1947–present

Farm to Market Road 750 (FM 750) runs from US 60 to SH 273 in Pampa. The highway is known locally as McCullough Street.

FM 750 was designated on September 9, 1947, running from US 60 to SH 273. On January 16, 1952, a spur route was created, connecting FM 750 to another point on US 60. The spur route was extended further north to SH 152 on November 21, 1956. The spur route was cancelled on November 26, 1957, with the mileage being transferred to FM 282.

Junction list

The entire route is in Pampa, Gray County.

mi	km	Destinations	Notes
0.0	0.0	US 60	
0.2	0.32	FM 282 east (South Price Road)	
1.2	1.9	SH 70 (South Hobart Street)	
2.2	3.5	SH 273 (South Barnes Street)	
1.000 mi = 1.609 km; 1.000 km = 0.621 mi

== FM 751 ==
Farm to Market Road 751
- Location: Hunt and Van Zandt counties
- Length: 15.601 mi (25.107 km)
- Existed: September 9, 1947–present

Farm to Market Road 751 (FM 751) starts at a junction with FM 47 in Wills Point and heads north crossing Lake Tawakoni in two places and through Hawk Cove before it comes to an end at a junction with FM 35 and SH 276 near Quinlan.

FM 751 was designated on September 9, 1947, from US 80 in Wills Point northward 8.3 miles (13.4 km) to a road intersection. On December 3, 1957, FM 751 was extended north to its current end.

Junction list

County	Location	mi	km	Destinations	Notes
Van Zandt	Wills Point			FM 47 – Wills Point, Point	
Hunt				FM 429 south – Ables Springs, Terrell	
Hunt				White Point Causeway over Lake Tawakoni	
Hunt	Quinlan			SH 276 – Quinlan, Emory	
1.000 mi = 1.609 km; 1.000 km = 0.621 mi

== FM 752 ==
Farm to Market Road 752
- Location: Cherokee County
- Length: 13.83 mi (22.26 km)
- Existed: 1947–present

Farm to Market Road 752 (FM 752) is located in central Cherokee County. It runs about 13.8 miles (22.2 km) from SH 294 in Alto to US 84/Loop 62 in Rusk.

FM 752 was designated on September 9, 1947, from Rusk to a point 7.8 miles (12.6 km) south. On January 31, 1972, the route was extended by 6.5 miles (10.5 km) to Alto by combining FM 2139.

Junction list

The entire route is in Cherokee County.

Location	mi	km	Destinations	Notes
Alto			SH 294 – Elkhart, Nacogdoches	Southern terminus
			FM 241 south	
Rusk			FM 343 – Atoy	
Rusk			FM 23 south	
Rusk			Loop 62 south	South end of Loop 62 overlap
Rusk			US 84 / Loop 62 north – Palestine, Mount Enterprise	Northern terminus; north end of Loop 62 overlap
1.000 mi = 1.609 km; 1.000 km = 0.621 mi: Concurrency terminus

== FM 753 ==
Farm to Market Road 753
- Location: Henderson County
- Length: 12.274 mi (19.753 km)
- Existed: October 25, 1947–present

Farm to Market Road 753 (FM 753) is located near Athens in eastern Texas.

The highway was first designated on October 25, 1947, running from SH 31 to FM 59. On December 17, 1952, the highway was extended further east to its current eastern terminus at SH 19.

FM 753 begins at an intersection with SH 31 in Crescent Heights, between Malakoff and Athens. The highway runs south before making a nearly 90 degree turn near County Road 1205, running in a more eastward direction. FM 753 intersects FM 59 and turns northeast at County Road 1108. The highway intersects RM 2970 and turns more into a northward direction before ending at an intersection with SH 19.

Junction list

The entire route is in Henderson County.

Location	mi	km	Destinations	Notes
Crescent Heights	0.0	0.0	SH 31 – Corsicana, Athens	
	3.0	4.8	FM 2494 north – Athens	
	6.6	10.6	FM 59 – Athens, Cayuga	
	8.4	13.5	RM 2970 south – Clements Scout Ranch	
	12.3	19.8	SH 19 – Athens, Palestine	
1.000 mi = 1.609 km; 1.000 km = 0.621 mi

== FM 754 ==
Farm to Market Road 754
- Location: Brooks County
- Length: 2.426 mi (3.904 km)
- Existed: December 17, 1947–present

Farm to Market Road 754 (FM 754) is located in Brooks County. It runs from SH 285 west of Falfurrias north to the Brooks/Jim Wells County Line.

FM 754 was designated on December 17, 1947, on the current route.

== FM 755 ==
Farm to Market Road 755
- Location: Brooks and Starr counties
- Length: 60.692 mi (97.674 km)
- Existed: December 17, 1947–present

Farm to Market Road 755 (FM 755) is located in Brooks and Starr counties. It runs from US 281 in Rachal to US 83 east of Rio Grande City.

FM 755 was designated on December 17, 1947, to run from FM 430 southwest to the Brooks/Starr County Line. On November 23, 1948, the road was extended southwest to what later became FM 1429, which became part of FM 1017 4 months later. On May 23, 1951, the road was extended southwest to US 83. On November 26, 1951, the road was extended east to US 281, replacing a section of FM 430. On July 30, 1965, the road was extended to the Starr/Camargo Bridge to Carmargo, Tamaulipas, Mexico. On June 23, 1981, the section south of US 83 section became a spur of US 83. On October 28, 1988, the road was extended south to Loop 254 (which became eastbound US 83 on May 1, 1989). On November 18, 2010, FM 755 was rerouted to end at US 83 east of Rio Grande City, replacing FM 7550, with the old route being given to Rio Grande City and Starr County upon completion.

== FM 756 ==
Farm to Market Road 756
- Location: Smith County
- Length: 9.512 mi (15.308 km)
- Existed: September 9, 1947–present

Farm to Market Road 756 (FM 756) is a 9.512-mile (15.308 km) in Smith County that connects FM 346 in Walnut Grove with Loop 323 in Tyler.

FM 756 was designated on September 9, 1947, from SH 110 near the south city limits of Tyler south to FM 346 west of Whitehouse. On July 14, 1949, the road was extended south 3.4 miles (5.5 km) to FM 344. On July 31, 1962, the northern terminus was relocated to Loop 323, shortening the route by 2.1 miles (3.4 km). On June 27, 1995, the section from Loop 323 to FM 346 was redesignated Urban Road 756 (UR 756). The designation of this section reverted to FM 756 with the elimination of the Urban Road system on November 15, 2018.

== FM 757 ==
Farm to Market Road 757
- Location: Smith County
- Length: 7.428 mi (11.954 km)
- Existed: September 9, 1947–present

Farm to Market Road 757 (FM 757) runs from SH 31 to FM 16 at Starrville in Smith County.

FM 757 begins at an intersection with SH 31 in Smith County, where the road continues south as CR 21 (Red Bird Road). From this intersection, the route heads north on a two-lane undivided road, heading through wooded areas with some small fields and homes. The highway crosses FM 2767 and continues through more rural areas. FM 757 heads into a mix of farmland and woodland as it comes to an interchange with I-20. Past this interchange, the road runs between farms to the west and woods to the east, intersecting the western terminus of FM 1252 before crossing US 271. FM 757 runs through more agricultural and wooded areas, ending at an intersection with FM 16 in Starrville.

The route (former War Highway 17) was designated on September 9, 1947, from US 271 to SH 31. On October 29, 1948, FM 757 was extended 1.8 miles (2.9 km) from Starrville to US 271. On June 28, 1963, it was extended to a rerouted SH 31.

== FM 758 ==
Farm to Market Road 758
- Location: Guadalupe County
- Length: 6.637 mi (10.681 km)
- Existed: September 9, 1947–present

Farm to Market Road 758 (FM 758) is located in Guadalupe County, that connects Texas State Highway 46 (formerly Farm to Market Road 25) in the Clear Springs neighborhood of New Braunfels with Texas State Highway 123 (south of the unincorporated community of Zorn).

FM 758 was designated on September 9, 1947, on the current route. FM 758 has no major junctions.

== FM 759 ==
Farm to Market Road 759
- Location: Hansford and Ochiltree counties
- Length: 21.806 mi (35.093 km)
- Existed: December 17, 1947–present

Farm to Market Road 759 (FM 759) is located in Hansford and Ochiltree counties. It runs from SH 207 in Spearman east to SH 70.

FM 759 was designated on September 9, 1947, to run from SH 117 (now SH 207) east to the Hansford/Ochiltree County Line. On October 28, 1953, the road was extended east to a road intersection 4.0 miles (6.4 km) west of SH 70. On October 26, 1954, the road was extended east to SH 70.

== FM 760 ==
Farm to Market Road 760
- Location: Hansford County
- Length: 13.009 mi (20.936 km)
- Existed: December 17, 1947 (Note: FM 760 was decommissioned from October 28, 1948 to July 14, 1949.)–present

Farm to Market Road 760 (FM 760) is located in Hansford County. There are concurrencies with FM 759 and SH 207.

FM 760 was designated on December 17, 1947, from FM 759 at or near Spearman south to the Hutchinson County line. FM 760 was cancelled on October 28, 1948, and combined with FM 279. On July 14, 1949, FM 760 was reinstated and extended south to FM 279, because FM 279 was rerouted on a new alignment to the east (which part was briefly FM 1264, and was later cancelled). On February 16, 1960, the section from FM 2017 to FM 281 (former FM 279) became part of FM 281 (as well as FM 2017 itself). On June 28, 1963, the road was extended north to its current terminus, completing its current route.

== FM 761 ==
Farm to Market Road 761
- Location: Reeves County
- Length: 2.51 mi (4.04 km)
- Existed: 1948–July 30, 2020

Farm to Market Road 761 (FM 761) was located in Reeves County in the city of Pecos. The 2.5-mile (4.0 km) route began at SH 17 and ran southeast along Stafford Boulevard, passing Reeves County Hospital before turning northeast onto South Eddy Street. Beyond West Walthall Street, the route turned toward the northwest, passing the Pecos Technical Training Center of Odessa College, before terminating at Bus. I-20.

FM 761 was designated on January 27, 1948, as a 2.2-mile (3.5 km) highway from SH 17 along Stafford Boulevard and Eddy Street terminating at 8th Street. The route was extended to Bus. I-20 on August 26, 1989. FM 761 was decommissioned on July 30, 2020, and the road was given to the city of Pecos.

== FM 762 ==
Farm to Market Road 762
- Location: Fort Bend County
- Length: 21.328 mi (34.324 km)
- Existed: December 17, 1947–present

Farm to Market Road 762 (FM 762) is located in Fort Bend County. The highway begins at FM 1462 south of Brazos Bend State Park, zig-zags in a northerly direction, crosses I-69/US 59 at exit 101, and ends at US 90 Alt. in Richmond.

FM 762 begins at a stop sign on FM 1462. At the intersection, southbound traffic on FM 762 can use a right-hand curve to access FM 1462 going west. After traveling 1.3 miles (2.1 km) north of the starting point, there is an intersection with Texas Park Road 72 at the entrance of Brazos Bend State Park. From the state park, FM 762 heads north, west, north and northwest for 5.9 miles (9.5 km) before reaching a three-way junction with FM 1994. In the northwesterly stretch, the highway crosses Big Creek and passes under electric transmission lines. At the intersection, FM 762 turns sharply to the northeast, then northwest, then northeast again before passing the George Ranch and curving to the north-northwest. The highway passes the George Ranch High School of the Lamar Consolidated Independent School District before crossing the BNSF Railway tracks and arriving at a stoplight-controlled intersection with FM 2759. From FM 1994 to FM 2759 at Crabb is a distance of 8.8 miles (14.2 km). At the intersection, FM 762 turns sharply left and parallels the BNSF tracks to the west-northwest for 2.5 miles (4.0 km) before coming to a stoplight at FM 2977. As highway starts to curve to the northwest, it crosses a bridge over I-69/US 59 at a distance of 0.3 miles (0.5 km) from the junction with FM 2977. There are shopping centers on the west side of the highway on both sides of I-69/US 59, which is locally called the Southwest Freeway. I-69/US 59 may be accessed in both directions via entrance ramps on the east side of FM 762. From I-69/US 59 at exit 103B, FM 762 heads to the northwest alongside the railroad tracks for 1.2 miles (1.9 km) to reach the traffic signal at FM 1640. The George Memorial Library is located on the east side of the intersection. From FM 1640, the highway continues 1.3 miles (2.1 km) nearly north to the stoplight on US 90 Alt. at Jackson Street. There is also a spur connection which turns east onto Austin Street for several blocks, then north on Second Street to terminate at the west end of the Brazos River bridge on US 90 Alt.

FM 762 was designated on December 17, 1947, to start from US 59 at Richmond, go first to Crabb and then south to the Tadpole Road in the direction of Long Point. The total distance was 14.6 miles (23.5 km) and the leg from Crabb to the south was 8.9 miles (14.3 km) in length. The end location was at the 2013 site of the intersection of FM 762 and FM 1994. (Note: This was determined by measuring 8.9 miles of map distance on the 2013 highway starting from Crabb.) Note that a 1955 map shows that US 59 shared the same route that is used by US 90 Alt. in 2013, which is about 3.0 miles (4.8 km) north of the 2013 path of US 59. On July 22, 1949, FM 762 was extended 4.4 miles (7.1 km) toward Long Point.

On May 23, 1951, FM 762 was extended south approximately 10.0 miles (16.1 km) to the county line and then an additional 1.4 miles (2.3 km) into Brazoria County to SH 36 near Damon. At that time, the highway's total distance was 30.1 miles (48.4 km). On October 10, 1961, the last 7.1 miles (11.4 km) segment of the highway going northeast from Damon was transferred to FM 1462. The total length of the highway was 21.3 miles (34.3 km) in 1961. On August 27, 1963, a 0.7 miles (1.1 km) spur connection in Richmond was made by routing the highway east on Austin Street and north on South 2nd Street to US 59 (now US 90 Alt.).

== FM 763 ==
Farm to Market Road 763
- Location: Nueces County
- Length: 7.088 mi (11.407 km)
- Existed: September 9, 1947–present

Farm to Market Road 763 (FM 763) is located in Nueces County. It runs from SH 44 1.5 mile east of Clarkwood south to FM 43.

FM 763 was designated on September 9, 1947, on the current route. On June 27, 1995, the section from SH 44 to FM 665 was designated as Urban Road 763 (UR 763). This section reverted to FM 763 with the elimination of the urban road system on November 15, 2018.

== FM 764 ==
Farm to Market Road 764
- Location: Henderson County
- Length: 1.897 mi (3.053 km)
- Existed: October 25, 1947–present

Farm to Market Road 764 (FM 764) is located in Henderson County. It runs from SH 31 in Trinidad to the Lone Star Plant (at or near FM 1667).

FM 764 was designated on October 25, 1947, to run from Spur 64 in Trinidad south and east to the Lone Star Plant. On November 22, 1948, the road was extended north to SH 31, replacing Spur 64 and completing its current route.

== FM 765 ==
Farm to Market Road 765
- Location: Tom Green, Concho, McCulloch, and San Saba counties
- Length: 88.837 mi (142.969 km)
- Existed: January 27, 1948–present

Farm to Market Road 765 (FM 765) is located in Tom Green, Concho, McCulloch, and San Saba counties. It runs from FM 1223 southeast of San Angelo to FM 45.

FM 765 was designated on January 27, 1948, to run from the Tom Green-Concho County Line east via Eola and Millersview to the Concho-McCulloch County Line. On October 23, 1950, the road was extended east to FM 503 in Doole. On November 20, 1951, the road was extended west to US 87 (now FM 1223), replacing FM 1720. On September 28, 1954, the road was extended east to US 283 in Fife. On March 31, 1966, the road was extended east to FM 45. On June 27, 1995, the section from FM 1223 to Loop 306 was redesignated internally as Urban Road 765. That section reverted to FM 765 upon the elimination of the urban road system on November 15, 2018.

== FM 766 ==
Farm to Market Road 766
- Location: DeWitt County
- Length: 16.704 mi (26.882 km)
- Existed: February 27, 1948–present

Farm to Market Road 766 (FM 766) is located in DeWitt County. It runs from US 77 in Cuero north 16.7 miles to Rivercrest Lane. A county road continues north to US 183.

FM 766 was designated on February 27, 1948, to run from US 77 in Cuero northwest 3.2 miles (5.1 km) to the city airport (now the Clarence N. Stevenson Unit). On July 28, 1955, the road was extended northwest to FM 953. On September 2, 1955, the road was extended northwest 3.1 miles (5.0 km) to a road intersection, replacing a portion of FM 953. On October 31, 1957, the road was extended northwest 5.7 miles (9.2 km) to another road intersection. On June 2, 1967, the road was extended northwest 3.0 miles (4.8 km) to its current terminus.

== FM 767 ==
Farm to Market Road 767
- Location: Hartley County
- Length: 36.007 mi (57.948 km)
- Existed: December 17, 1947–present

Farm to Market Road 767 (FM 767) is located in Hartley County. It runs from US 54 near Roemro to US 385/SH 354 in Channing.

FM 767 was designated on December 17, 1947, on the current route, but the west end was at US 54 in Romero. On October 29, 1948, the west end was moved to US 54 at or near Romero.

== FM 768 ==
Farm to Market Road 768
- Location: Cherokee County
- Length: 16.392 mi (26.380 km)
- Existed: 1947–present

Farm to Market Road 768 (FM 768) is located in north-central Cherokee County. It travels approximately 16.4 miles (26.4 km) from an intersection with US 84/SH 110 in Rusk north through Gallatin, then northwestward into Jacksonville where it intersects Loop 456 and US 69.

The first section of FM 768, from the US 69 intersection southeastward for 8.3 miles (13.4 km) was commissioned on September 9, 1947. It was extended on October 28, 1953, by 1.4 miles (2.3 km) to FM 22 in Gallatin. On April 21, 1958, FM 854 was cancelled and its mileage was added to FM 768, extending it to Rusk.

== FM 769 ==
Farm to Market Road 769
- Location: Yoakum and Cochran counties
- Length: 41.721 mi (67.143 km)
- Existed: November 18, 1947–present

Farm to Market Road 769 (FM 769), also known as State Line Road, is located in Yoakum and Cochran counties. The 42-mile (68 km) road runs along the New Mexico state line from SH 83 near Denver City to SH 125 near Bledsoe and passes through the small community of Bronco. The road has intersections with US 82, US 380, and FM 1585. FM 769 was formerly part of a much longer route that included the current SH 125 and was unofficially signed as SH 125 for several decades.

FM 769 begins at SH 83 near the point where SH 83 crosses the New Mexico state line and meets NM 132 west of Denver City in southwestern Yoakum County. FM 769 continues northward closely following the state line and crossing US 82 southwest of Plains. The road continues north along the state line intersecting US 380 at Bronco northwest of Plains before crossing into Cochran County. The road then intersects FM 1585 before the road ends at SH 125 near the point where SH 125 meets NM 125 southwest of Bledsoe. FM 769 passes through mostly agricultural lands and oil and gas fields across the largely flat and featureless terrain of the Llano Estacado.

FM 769 was designated on November 18, 1947, from SH 290 (now SH 114) at Whiteface to SH 214 in Lehman. On April 1, 1948, the road was extended to the New Mexico state line, while also being extended 10 miles (16 km) south from Whiteface to an intersection with a road that two years later would become FM 301. On October 18, 1948, the road was extended north 0.36 miles (0.58 km) to SH 24 (now SH 114), replacing Spur 74. On December 17, 1952, the road was extended south 9.7 miles (15.6 km) along the New Mexico state line to a road intersection.

On March 30, 1955, FM 769 was signed (but not designated) as SH 125 as it connected with NM 125 at the state line. On November 2, 1955, the section from SH 116 (now SH 114) near Whiteface south to FM 301 was transferred to FM 1780. On May 2, 1962, the road was extended south 12.2 miles (19.6 km) to US 380. On May 25, 1962, the road was extended south 11.5 miles (18.5 km) to FM 1077 (now US 82), replacing FM 2010. The route was extended 8.5 miles (13.7 km) farther south along the state line to SH 83 west of Denver City on January 26, 1969.

The SH 125 state highway designation became official on August 29, 1990, and the FM 769 designation was erroneously eliminated. However, this was corrected so that only the portion east of the state line became SH 125.

Junction list

County	Location	mi	km	Destinations	Notes
Yoakum		0.0	0.0	SH 83 – Lovington, Denver City	
Yoakum		8.6	13.8	US 82 – Lovington, Plains	
Yoakum		20.2	32.5	US 380 – Tatum, Plains	
Cochran		37.1	59.7	FM 1585 east	
Cochran		41.7	67.1	SH 125 – Tatum, Bledsoe	
1.000 mi = 1.609 km; 1.000 km = 0.621 mi

== FM 770 ==
Farm to Market Road 770
- Location: Hardin and Liberty counties
- Length: 38.599 mi (62.119 km)
- Existed: September 9, 1947–present

Farm to Market Road 770 (FM 770) is located in Hardin and Liberty counties. It runs from FM 563 northeast to SH 326 southwest of Kountze.

FM 770 was designated on September 9, 1947, to run from SH 326 southwest to US 90 in Raywood. On November 20, 1951, the road was extended south 2.7 miles (4.3 km) from US 90. On December 17, 1952, the road was extended southwest to FM 563, completing its current route.

== FM 771 ==
Farm to Market Road 771
- Location: Kleberg County
- Length: 9.229 mi (14.853 km)
- Existed: February 27, 1948–present

Farm to Market Road 771 (FM 771) is located in Kleberg County. It runs from US 77 in Riviera to Riviera Beach.

FM 771 was designated on February 27, 1948, on the current route.

== FM 772 ==
Farm to Market Road 772
- Location: Kleberg County
- Length: 21.011 mi (33.814 km)
- Existed: February 27, 1948–present

Farm to Market Road 772 (FM 772) is located in Kleberg County. It runs from BU 77-V south of Kingsville west, south, east, and south to RM 628.

FM 772 was designated on February 27, 1948, to run from US 77 (now BU 77-V) north of Ricardo west, south, and east to US 77 south of Ricardo. On December 16, 1948, the road was extended east 4.0 miles (6.4 km) to a road intersection. On May 5, 1966, the road was extended southeast to FM 628 (now RM 628), replacing FM 2775 and completing its current route.

== FM 773 ==
Farm to Market Road 773
- Location: Van Zandt and Henderson counties
- Length: 23.995 mi (38.616 km)
- Existed: October 25, 1947–present

Farm to Market Road 773 (FM 773) is located in Van Zandt and Henderson counties. It runs from SH 31 in Murchison to FM 1255.

FM 773 was designated on October 25, 1947, to run from SH 31 north 5.0 miles (8.0 km). On July 14, 1949, the road was extended north to FM 858 (which was extended that same day). On October 26, 1954, the road was extended north to FM 1255, completing its current route.

== FM 774 ==
Farm to Market Road 774
- Location: Refugio County
- Length: 31.467 mi (50.641 km)
- Existed: September 9, 1947–present

Farm to Market Road 774 (FM 774) is located in Refugio County. It runs from US 77 in Refugio to SH 239 in Austwell.

FM 774 was designated on September 7, 1947, on the current route.

== FM 775 ==
Farm to Market Road 775
- Location: Guadalupe and Wilson counties
- Length: 31.499 mi (50.693 km)
- Existed: September 9, 1947–present

Farm to Market Road 775 (FM 775) is located in Guadalupe and Wilson counties. It runs from I-10 southwest of Seguin to FM 1303.

FM 775 was designated on September 9, 1947, to run from US 90 (now I-10) southwest of Seguin to New Berlin. On July 14, 1949, the road was extended south to the Guadalupe/Wilson County Line. On September 15, 1949, the road was extended to US 87 (now SL 321) in La Vernia, replacing FM 1106. On November 3, 1972, the road was extended southwest 3.0 miles (4.8 km) from US 87, creating concurrencies with SL 321 and US 87. On September 5, 1973, the road was extended southwest to Sulphur Springs Road. On November 19, 1979, a section from SL 321 to US 87 was added, eliminating both concurrencies. On October 21, 1981, the road was extended northwest 2.2 miles (3.5 km) on Sulphur Springs Road to a county road, but this extension was renumbered to FM 3432 by district request shortly after that, resulting in FM 775 ending at FM 3432. On September 29, 1987, the road was extended south to US 181. On February 24, 1994, the road was extended southwest to FM 1303, replacing FM 3444.

== FM 776 ==
Farm to Market Road 776
- Location: Jasper County
- Length: 2.206 mi (3.550 km)
- Existed: December 17, 1947–present

Farm to Market Road 776 (FM 776) is located in Jasper County. It runs from US 96 in Jasper to SH 63.

FM 776 was designated on December 17, 1947, on the current route.

== FM 777 ==
Farm to Market Road 777
- Location: Jasper County
- Length: 15.574 mi (25.064 km)
- Existed: December 17, 1947–present

Farm to Market Road 777 (FM 777) is located in Jasper County. It runs from FM 2799 west of Jasper to SH 63 in Curtis.

FM 777 was designated on December 17, 1947, to run from US 190/SH 63 (now FM 2799) west of Jasper to Beech Grove. On November 23, 1948, the road was extended to US 190 in Science Hall. On January 29, 1959, the road was extended northeast along the old route of US 190 to SH 63 in Curtis, completing its current route.

== FM 778 ==
Farm to Market Road 778
- Location: Wood County
- Length: 15.564 mi (25.048 km)
- Existed: December 17, 1947–present

Farm to Market Road 778 (FM 778) is located in Wood County. It runs from SH 37 in Quitman to US 80 in Crow.

FM 778 was designated on December 17, 1947, to run from SH 37 in Quitman to Fm 49 in Hainesville. On May 23, 1951, the road was extended to US 80 in Crow, completing its current rote.

== FM 779 ==
Farm to Market Road 779
- Location: Rains and Wood counties
- Length: 24.316 mi (39.133 km)
- Existed: December 17, 1947–present

Farm to Market Road 779 (FM 779) is located in Rains and Wood counties. It runs from FM 515 east of Emory to SH 37 south of Quitman.

FM 779 was designated on December 17, 1947, to run from US 69 in Golden to SH 37. On October 26, 1954, the road was extended west to FM 17. On September 20, 1961, the road was extended northwest to US 69 (now FM 2795), replacing FM 2458. On May 7, 1970, the road was extended north to FM 515, completing its current route.

== FM 780 ==
Farm to Market Road 780
- Location: Ellis County
- Length: 4.993 mi (8.035 km)
- Existed: April 1, 1948–present

Farm to Market Road 780 (FM 780) is located in Ellis County. It runs from FM 660 to Walnut Springs.

FM 780 was designated on April 1, 1948, to run from FM 660 east of Ferris to India. On November 20, 1951, the road was extended east 4.0 miles (6.4 km) to a road intersection, but this extension was cancelled on March 28, 1952 due to the improvement of US 77 in Waxahachie. On March 26, 1953, this extension was reinstated.

== FM 781 ==
Farm to Market Road 781
- Location: Andrews County
- Existed: May 7, 1948–August 28, 1990

Farm to Market Road 781 (FM 781) was located in Andrews County. It is now SH 128.

FM 781 was designated on May 7, 1948, to run from the Texas/New Mexico state line to FM 703. On March 30, 1955, FM 781 was signed (but not designated) as SH 128. The designation was officially changed to SH 128 on August 29, 1990, cancelling FM 781.

== FM 782 ==
Farm to Market Road 782
- Location: Rusk County
- Length: 18.509 mi (29.787 km)
- Existed: February 27, 1948–present

Farm to Market Road 782 (FM 782) is located in Rusk County. It runs from US 259 north of Henderson northeastward to SH 149 with a loop connection at Oak Hill.

FM 782 was designated on February 27, 1948, to run from SH 26 northeast of Henderson to Oak Hill. On May 7, 1948, the route was changed slightly, and the road was numbered. On June 24, 1952, the road was rerouted northeast to SH 149, replacing FM 1717, and a loop connection was added along the old route of FM 782 and the section of FM 1717 that did not become part of the main route, completing its current route.

== RM 783 ==
Ranch to Market Road 783
- Location: Kerr, Gillespie, Mason counties
- Length: 48.788 mi (Note: The certified length given is shorter than the actual mileage, as the TxDOT description of RM 783 considers it to be discontinuous at rather than concurrent with US 290 in Harper.) (78.517 km)
- Existed: May 7, 1948 (Note: RM 783 was previously designated as FM 783 from 1948 to 1954.)–present

Ranch to Market Road 783 (RM 783) is located in the Texas Hill Country.

RM 783 begins in Kerrville at an intersection with SH 27 (Junction Highway). RM 783 runs through west Kerrville and is known locally as Harper Road. The highway leaves the city just north of Holdsworth Drive and crosses Interstate 10 shortly thereafter. Just after crossing Interstate 10, RM 783 passes near the corporate office of James Avery Craftsman. The highway runs through rural and hilly areas of Kerr and Gillespie counties before arriving in the town of Harper, sharing an overlap with U.S. Route 290. After leaving the town, RM 783 runs through more hilly and rural areas of Gillespie County before entering Mason County, ending at an intersection with U.S. Route 87 southeast of Mason.

RM 783 was designated on May 7, 1948, as Farm to Market Road 783 (FM 783), from US 290 in Harper to SH 27 in Kerrville. On October 28, 1953, FM 783 was extended northeast 6.5 miles (10.5 km). On September 28, 1954, FM 783 was extended north to FM 648 at Doss and changed to RM 783. On October 1, 1956, RM 783 was extended north to US 87, replacing a portion of FM 648, which was redesignated as RM 648 that same day.

Junction list

County	Location	mi	km	Destinations	Notes
Kerr	Kerrville	0.0	0.0	SH 27 (Junction Highway) – Ingram, Comfort	
Kerr		2.3	3.7	I-10 – Junction, San Antonio	I-10 exit 505
Gillespie	Harper	20.0	32.2	US 290 west – Junction	South end of US 290 overlap
Gillespie	Harper	20.4	32.8	US 290 east / FM 2093 east – Fredericksburg, Tivydale	North end of US 290 overlap
Gillespie	Doss	34.6	55.7	RM 648 east – Hilltop	
Mason		49.2	79.2	US 87 – Mason, Fredericksburg	
1.000 mi = 1.609 km; 1.000 km = 0.621 mi: Concurrency terminus

== FM 784 ==
Farm to Market Road 784
- Location: Hale and Floyd counties
- Length: 21.789 mi (35.066 km)
- Existed: May 7, 1948–present

Farm to Market Road 784 (FM 784) is located in Hale and Floyd counties. It runs from FM 400 to SH 207 in Floydada. There are concurrencies with FM 789 and US 70.

FM 784 was designated on May 7, 1948, to run from US 70 in Floydada west to Sandhil land southwest to Harmony School. On July 21, 1949, the section from Floydada to Sandhill became part of FM 1310, and the road was rerouted to go north and east to a road intersection, with a proposed future extension to Lockney. On September 20, 1949, FM 784 was rerouted back on its original route, with the deleted sections becoming part of FM 1310. On November 20, 1951, the road was extended west 3.3 miles (5.3 km) to FM 1314 (now FM 789). On December 21, 1959, the section from FM 789 to FM 579 became part of FM 579 (now FM 37), and the section from there to Sandhill became part of FM 378. Instead, FM 784 was rerouted west to FM 789, replacing a section of FM 1310, which was cancelled as the remainder became part of FM 378. On September 15, 1967, the road was extended east over the old location of SH 207 to SH 207. On October 29, 1968, the road was rerouted over FM 594 from US 70 to SH 207, while the old route on Missouri Street was given to the city of Floydada, completing its current route, but this did not take effect until FM 594's construction was completed.

== FM 785 ==
Farm to Market Road 785
- Location: Cass County
- Length: 2.744 mi (4.416 km)
- Existed: November 21, 1956–present

Farm to Market Road 785 (FM 785) is located in Cass County. It runs from FM 249 to FM 74.

FM 785 was designated on November 21, 1956, from FM 251 north to FM 74 in Queen City. On June 26, 1967, FM 785 was extended south to FM 249 over old location FM 251.

=== FM 785 (1948–1953) ===
Farm to Market Road 785
- Location: Floyd County
- Existed: May 7, 1948–December 2, 1953

FM 785 was first designated on May 7, 1948, running from SH 207 east 6.0 miles (9.7 km) to the Cedar Hill School in Floyd County. On December 17, 1952, the highway was extended northeast 10.6 miles (17.1 km) to a road intersection. This FM 785 was cancelled on December 2, 1953, with the mileage being transferred to FM 97.

=== FM 785 (1954) ===
Farm to Market Road 785
- Location: Cass County
- Existed: October 13, 1954–November 21, 1956

FM 785 was designated again on October 13, 1954, running from FM 130 to FM 1399. This designation was cancelled on November 21, 1956, with the mileage being transferred to FM 995, with the FM 785 designation being reused on its current route in the same county.

== FM 786 ==
Farm to Market Road 786
- Location: Floyd County
- Length: 14.251 mi (22.935 km)
- Existed: May 7, 1948–present

Farm to Market Road 786 (FM 786) is located in Floyd County. It runs from FM 378 south of Lockney to a county road. There is a concurrency with SH 207.

FM 786 was designated on May 7, 1948, to run from SH 207 east via Center School to Fairview School. On November 25, 1975, the road was extended west to FM 378, completing its current route.

== FM 787 ==
Farm to Market Road 787
- Location: Liberty and Hardin counties
- Length: 41.94 mi (67.50 km)
- Existed: June 2, 1947–present

Farm to Market Road 787 (FM 787) is located in Liberty and Hardin counties. It runs from SH 105/SH 321 in Cleveland to FM 770 in Saratoga.

FM 787 was designated on June 2, 1947 (numbered May 1948), from SH 146 near Rye via Votaw to Saratoga. On December 21, 1984, the road was extended to SH 321 in Cleveland along an old routing of SH 105 after it was routed on top of FM 162.

== FM 788 ==
Farm to Market Road 788
- Location: Hale and Floyd counties
- Length: 26.191 mi (42.150 km)
- Existed: May 7, 1948–present

Farm to Market Road 788 (FM 788) is located in Hale and Floyd counties. It runs from SH 194 east to FM 378.

FM 788 was designated on May 7, 1948, to run from US 70 in Plainview north and east to the Hale/Floyd County Line. On December 16, 1948, the road was extended east to and south to US 70 near Aiken. On December 17, 1952, a section became part of FM 400, and FM 788 was rerouted to go west to SH 194. On October 26, 1954, FM 788 was rerouted east to FM 598 (now FM 378), while the old route south to US 70 was redesignated as FM 2301.

== FM 789 ==
Farm to Market Road 789
- Location: Lubbock and Hale counties
- Length: 41.282 mi (Note: The certified length given is shorter than the actual mileage, as the TxDOT description of FM 789 considers it to be discontinuous at rather than concurrent with US 62/US 82/SH 114 and FM 54.) (66.437 km)
- Existed: May 7, 1948–present

Farm to Market Road 789 (FM 789) is located in Lubbock and Hale counties.

FM 789 begins at an intersection with FM 40 near Acuff. The highway travels north before sharing an overlap with US 62/US 82/SH 114 between Idalou and Ralls. Leaving the concurrency, FM 789 continues to run north before entering the town of Petersburg, where the highway has a short overlap with FM 54. Leaving its overlap with FM 54, the highway runs north through rural areas of eastern Hale County before reaching its northern terminus at US 70 between Plainview and Lockney.

FM 789 was designated on May 7, 1948, from US 70 southward and eastward 6.8 miles (10.9 km) to a road intersection south of Bellview School. On December 2, 1953, FM 789 was extended south to 1 mile (1.6 km) west of Estacado, replacing FM 1314. On October 31, 1957, FM 789 was extended south to US 62. On July 28, 1959, FM 789 was rerouted 1.0 mile (1.6 km) to the west, so that the section from FM 1527's previous end west 1 mile (1.6 km) was transferred to FM 1527, the section from FM 1527 to US 62 was cancelled, and FM 789 was rerouted south on a road 1 mile (1.6 km) west of the previous road. On May 5, 1966, FM 789 was extended south to FM 40.

Junction list

County	Location	mi	km	Destinations	Notes
Lubbock		0.0	0.0	FM 40 – Lubbock	
Lubbock		5.0	8.0	US 62 west / US 82 west / SH 114 west – Idalou, Lubbock	South end of US 62/US 82/SH 114 overlap
Lubbock		6.0	9.7	US 62 east / US 82 / SH 114 east – Ralls, Crosbyton	North end of US 62/US 82/SH 114 overlap
Lubbock		11.5	18.5	FM 1527 east	
Hale	Petersburg	20.6	33.2	FM 54 west	South end of FM 54 overlap
Hale		20.9	33.6	FM 54 east	North end of FM 54 overlap
Hale		24.9	40.1	FM 37 east	South end of FM 37 overlap
Hale		25.7	41.4	FM 37 west	North end of FM 37 overlap
Hale		29.2	47.0	FM 784 east – Lockney	South end of FM 784 overlap
Hale		30.8	49.6	FM 784 west	North end of FM 784 overlap
Hale		36.0	57.9	FM 2883 – Lockney	
Hale		42.6	68.6	US 70 – Plainview, Floydada	
1.000 mi = 1.609 km; 1.000 km = 0.621 mi: Concurrency terminus

== FM 790 ==
Farm to Market Road 790
- Location: Dimmit County
- Length: 1.485 mi (2.390 km)
- Existed: May 7, 1948–present

Farm to Market Road 790 (FM 790) is located in Dimmit County. It runs from SH US 277 to US 83.

FM 790 was designated on May 7, 1948, on the current route.

== FM 791 ==
Farm to Market Road 791
- Location: McMullen, Atascosa, and Karnes counties
- Length: 44.057 mi (70.903 km)
- Existed: May 31, 1948–present

Farm to Market Road 791 (FM 791) is located in McMullen, Atascosa, and Karnes counties. It runs from SH 16 to US 181 in Falls City.

FM 791 was designated on May 31, 1948, to run from US 181 to Deweesville. On November 14, 1953, the road was rerouted and extended to US 281 (now US 281 Alternate) in Campbellton, replacing FM 1785, with the old route to Deweesville becoming a spur connection. On May 24, 1962, the spur connection became part of FM 1344. On August 31, 1967, the road was extended to SH 16, replacing RM 2925.

== FM 792 ==
Farm to Market Road 792
- Location: Karnes County
- Length: 8.471 mi (13.633 km)
- Existed: March 31, 1948–present

Farm to Market Road 792 (FM 792) is located in Karnes County. It runs from SH 80 to SH 72 in Kenedy.

FM 792 was designated on March 31, 1948, to run from US 181 in Kenedy to SH 80. On April 20, 1982, FM 792 was shortened to its current route due to relocation of SH 72 to bypass Kenedy.

== FM 793 ==
Farm to Market Road 793
- Location: El Paso County
- Length: 1.906 mi (3.067 km)
- Existed: October 31, 1958–present

Farm to Market Road 793 (FM 793) is located in Fabens. It is known locally as Fabens Road.

FM 793 begins at FM 76, a few blocks northeast of that route's intersection with SH 20. The highway travels northeast through Fabens, passing near the Fabens Airport, before ending at I-10.

FM 793 was designated on October 31, 1958, along its current route.

=== FM 793 (1948–1950) ===
Farm to Market Road 793
- Location: Gonzales County
- Existed: June 1, 1948–April 28, 1950

FM 793 was previously designated in Gonzales County on June 1, 1948, running from SH 200 east to Nickel. This route was cancelled on April 28, 1950, and its mileage was transferred to FM 532.

== FM 794 ==
Farm to Market Road 794
- Location: Gonzales County
- Length: 11.308 mi (18.198 km)
- Existed: June 1, 1948–present

Farm to Market Road 794 (FM 794) is located in Gonzales County. It runs from US 90 in Harwood to US 90A in Gonzales.

FM 794 was designated on June 1, 1948, to run from US 90 to SH 29 (now US 183) north of Gonzales. The south end was actually constructed to end at SH 3 (later SH 97) in Gonzales, and the description was updated on September 14, 1950 to reflect this. On April 27, 1995, the section from US 90A to SH 97, as well as the section of SH 97 from US 90A to US 183 (now BU 183-V) was cancelled and given to the city of Gonzales due to the rerouting of US 183 and creation of BU 183-V on the old route.

== FM 795 ==
Farm to Market Road 795
- Location: Gonzales County
- Length: 3.188 mi (5.131 km)
- Existed: June 1, 1948–present

Farm to Market Road 795 (FM 795) is located in Gonzales County. It runs from FM 532 to Dilworth.

FM 795 was designated on June 1, 1948, on the current route.

== FM 796 ==
Farm to Market Road 796
- Location: Bee and San Patricio counties
- Length: 33.432 mi (53.804 km)
- Existed: February 27, 1948–present

Farm to Market Road 796 (FM 796) is located in Bee and San Patricio counties. It runs from US 59 To I-37 in Edroy.

FM 796 was designated on February 27, 1948, to run from SH 202 (now US 59) to US 59 (now SH 359) in Tynan. On June 28, 1963, the road was extended to SH 9 (now I-37), replacing FM 2187 and completing its current route.

== FM 797 ==
Farm to Market Road 797
- Location: Bee County
- Length: 8.975 mi (14.444 km)
- Existed: February 27, 1948–present

Farm to Market Road 797 (FM 797) is located in Bee County. It runs from US 181 in Skidmore to FM 796 in Olmos.

FM 797 was designated on February 27, 1948, on the current route.

== FM 798 ==
Farm to Market Road 798
- Location: Bee County
- Length: 13.155 mi (21.171 km)
- Existed: February 27, 1948–present

Farm to Market Road 798 (FM 798) is located in Bee County. It runs from US 181 in Tulsita to US 72 in Pawnee.

FM 798 was designated on February 27, 1948, on the current route.

== FM 799 ==
Farm to Market Road 799
- Location: Bee and Live Oak counties
- Length: 27.888 mi (44.881 km)
- Existed: February 27, 1948–present

Farm to Market Road 799 (FM 799) is located in Bee County. It runs from FM 673 southwest, southeast, and northeast to I-37. There is a concurrency with US 59.

FM 799 was designated on February 27, 1948, to run from FM 673 to the Bee/Live Oak County Line near Cadiz. On October 26, 1954, the road was extended southwest to US 59, replacing FM 1357. On November 21, 1956, the road was extended southeast 4.0 miles (6.4 km) to a road intersection. On May 6, 1964, the road was extended northeast to SH 9 (now I-37), completing its current route.
