= Crescent Heights =

Crescent Heights may refer to:

- Crescent Heights, Calgary, Alberta, Canada
  - Crescent Heights High School (Calgary)
- Crescent Heights, New Jersey, United States
- Crescent Heights, Texas
- Crescent Heights High School (Medicine Hat) in Medicine Hat, Alberta, Canada
- Crescent Heights (company), American real estate developer
