= Farm to Market Road 423 =

Highway in Texas

Farm to Market Road 423

Route information
- Maintained by TxDOT
- Length: 10.811 mi (17.399 km)
- Existed: 1945–present

Major junctions
- South end: SH 121 / SH 121 Toll in The Colony
- FM 720 in Little Elm
- North end: US 380 in Frisco

Location
- Country: United States
- State: Texas
- Counties: Denton

Highway system
- Highways in Texas; Interstate; US; State; Former; Toll; Loops; Spurs; FM/RM; Park; Rec
← FM 422	→ FM 424

Farm to Market Road 423 (FM 423) is a farm to market road in Denton County, Texas.

== Route description ==
FM 423 is major north–south arterial through the cities of The Colony, Frisco, and Little Elm, providing access to area highways for both existing residences and new subdivisions being developed in central Denton County. The route begins at SH 121 (the mainlanes of which are the Sam Rayburn Tollway) in The Colony. The route travels north through The Colony, where it is known locally as Main Street, and into Frisco. It briefly skirts the eastern edge of Little Elm before reentering Frisco and ending at US 380. South of FM423 the road is signed as Josey Lane, a major north–south thoroughfare through the cities of Carrollton and Farmers Branch.

Due to rapid growth during the late 1990s and early 2000s, plans were made to widen FM 423 into a six (6) to eight (8) lane thoroughfare. FM 423 will be widened to eight (8) lanes between SH121/Sam Rayburn Tollway and Ridgepointe Drive, and widened to six (6) lanes from Ridgepoint Drive north to SH380, approximately 11 miles. The new road will include auxiliary Left and Right Turn lanes, a new signal light at Lake Highlands Drive, and sound barrier walls in specific locations. Construction from the northern city limit of The Colony north to FM 720 is complete as of June 2013.

The roadway construction contract was conditionally approved by TxDOT in September 2011. The construction is scheduled to start mid to late 2013 after the private utilities have completed relocation. The project was completed in September 2017.

== Dedication ==
FM 423 was designated the U.S. Army Sergeant Enrique Mondragon Memorial Highway by HB 1044, signed into law by Governor Greg Abbott in June 2015. SGT Mondragon, from Little Elm, Texas, was killed in action in Afghanistan in December 2012.

== History ==
FM 423 was first designated on July 2, 1945. Its original routing was from Lewisville to the former Lake Dallas dam along what was then SH 24. Upon completion of the Lewisville Dam and the creation of Lewisville Lake in 1955, the route's alignment was shifted to the east, connecting FM 720 (itself an older alignment of SH 24) to SH 121. The route was extended northward on October 31, 1958, to the newer alignment of SH 24, which would be redesignated US 380 in 1971. This route contained a concurrency with FM 720; this was removed on January 31, 2002 with the truncation of FM 720.

== Major intersections ==
The entire route is in Denton County.

Location	mi	km	Destinations	Notes
The Colony	0.0	0.0	Sam Rayburn Tollway (Sam Rayburn Tollway) – Lewisville, McKinney	Southern terminus
The Colony	1.0	1.6	S. Colony Blvd.	
The Colony	2.1	3.4	N. Colony Blvd.	
Frisco	4.2	6.8	Lebanon Rd.	
Frisco	5.5	8.9	Stonebrook Pkwy.	
Little Elm–Frisco line	6.1	9.8	Main St./King Rd.	
Little Elm	7.1	11.4	FM 720 (Little Elm Pkwy.)	
Little Elm–Frisco line	7.9	12.7	FM 2934 (El Dorado Pkwy.)	
Little Elm–Frisco line	8.8	14.2	Panther Creek Pkwy. / Woodlake Pkwy.	
Frisco	10.2	16.4	Rockhill Pkwy.	
Frisco–Prosper line	10.8	17.4	US 380 – Denton, McKinney	Northern terminus
1.000 mi = 1.609 km; 1.000 km = 0.621 mi
