= List of state highway spurs in Texas (100–199) =

- Texas State Highway Spur marker

Highway names
- Interstates: Interstate Highway X (IH-X, I-X)
- US Highways: U.S. Highway X (US X)
- State: State Highway X (SH X)
- Loops: Loop X
- Spurs: Spur X
- Farm or Ranch to Market Roads: Farm to Market Road X (FM X); Ranch-to-Market Road X (RM X)
- Park Roads: Park Road X (PR X)

System links
- Highways in Texas; Interstate; US; State; Former; Toll; Loops; Spurs; FM/RM; Park; Rec

State highway spurs in Texas are owned and maintained by the Texas Department of Transportation (TxDOT).

== Spur 100 ==
State Highway Spur 100
- Location: Kerr County
- Length: 0.296 mi (476 m)
- Existed: May 9, 1940–present

Spur 100 is located in Kerr County. It runs from SH 27 to the entrance of the American Legion Cemetery.

Spur 100 was designated on May 9, 1940, on the current route as a replacement of SH 264.

== Spur 101 ==
State Highway Spur 101
- Location: Gregg County
- Length: 0.690 mi (1,110 m)
- Existed: May 9, 1940–February 28, 2008

Spur 101 was designated on May 9, 1940, from SH 259 (now SH 42), 0.25 miles (0.40 km) south of the Rusk–Gregg county line to SH 26 (now US 259), 0.25 miles (0.40 km) south of the Rusk–Gregg county line as a replacement of SH 277. On September 29, 1992, Spur 101 was rerouted along Houston Street (former SH 42 and Spur 378); the old route along Woodlawn Street became SH 42. On February 28, 2008, Spur 101 was cancelled and removed from the highway system.

== Spur 102 ==
State Highway Spur 102
- Location: Johnson County
- Length: 0.704 mi (1,133 m)
- Existed: May 9, 1940–present

Spur 102 is located in Johnson County. It runs from US 67 to the entrance of Southwestern Adventist University in Keene.

Spur 102 was designated on May 9, 1940, on the current route as a replacement of SH 292.

== Spur 103 ==
Spur 103 is a designation applied to two different highways. No highway currently uses the Spur 103 designation.

=== Spur 103 (1940) ===
State Highway Spur 103
- Location: Leon County
- Existed: May 9, 1940–August 25, 1949

The first use of the Spur 103 designation was in Leon County, from US 79 east of Jewett to Newby. Spur 103 was cancelled on August 25, 1949, and became a portion of FM 1512.

=== Spur 103 (1960) ===
State Highway Spur 103
- Location: Tarrant County
- Existed: April 25, 1960–October 26, 2006

The next use of the Spur 103 designation was in Tarrant County, from then-SH 121 in Grapevine south along an extension of Main Street to then-proposed SH 114. On October 26, 2006, Spur 103 was cancelled and returned to the city of Grapevine.

== Spur 104 ==
State Highway Spur 104
- Location: Madison County
- Length: 0.985 mi (1,585 m)
- Existed: June 27, 1963–present

Spur 104 is located in Madisonville. It runs from SH 75 (old US 75) to I-45.

Spur 104 was designated on June 27, 1963, on the current route.

=== Spur 104 (1940) ===
State Highway Spur 104
- Location: Limestone County
- Existed: May 21, 1940–June 12, 1956

The original Spur 104 was designated on May 21, 1940, from SH 14 in Kosse east two blocks along Washington Street to Narcissus Street. Spur 104 was cancelled on June 12, 1956, and transferred to SH 7.

== Spur 105 ==
State Highway Spur 105
- Location: Knox County
- Existed: July 1, 1940–January 7, 1948

Spur 105 was designated on July 1, 1940, from SH 222 to Munday. This was formerly SH 222 before 1939. On January 7, 1948, Spur 105 was cancelled and became an extension of SH 222.

== Spur 106 ==
State Highway Spur 106
- Location: Madison County
- Existed: June 29, 1940–April 14, 1943

Spur 106 was designated on June 29, 1940, from US 81, along E. Hildebrand Avenue to US 281 near northern San Antonio. On April 14, 1943, Spur 106 was cancelled.

== Spur 107 ==
State Highway Spur 107
- Location: Kaufman County
- Existed: July 1, 1940–March 11, 1949

Spur 107 was designated on July 1, 1940, from SH 34 to the business district of Scurry. On March 11, 1949, Spur 107 was cancelled and became a portion of FM 148.

== Spur 108 ==
State Highway Spur 108
- Location: Hood County
- Existed: July 1, 1940–March 26, 1942

Spur 108 was designated on July 1, 1940, from US 281 to Lipan. On March 26, 1942, Spur 108 was cancelled in exchange for being redesignated as FM 7 (now FM 4).

== Spur 110 ==
State Highway Spur 110
- Location: Hill County
- Existed: July 1, 1940–July 14, 1949

Spur 110 was designated on July 1, 1940, from US 81 to Abbott. On July 14, 1949, Spur 110 was cancelled and became a portion of FM 1242.

== Spur 111 ==
State Highway Spur 111
- Location: Dickens County
- Existed: August 27, 1940–November 6, 1948

Spur 111 was designated on August 27, 1940, from SH 70 at Spur (moved to Loop 21 in 1942) west to the State Experimental Farm. On November 6, 1948, Spur 111 was cancelled and redesignated as FM 836 (later FM Spur 836, now FM 2794).

== Spur 112 ==
State Highway Spur 112
- Location: Willacy County
- Length: 0.355 mi (571 m)
- Existed: July 30, 1965–present

Spur 112 is located in Lyford. It runs from Bus. US 77 to I-69E/US 77.

Spur 112 was designated on July 30, 1965, on the current route.

=== Spur 112 (1940) ===
State Highway Spur 112
- Location: Wilson County
- Existed: October 22, 1940–December 8, 1949

The original Spur 112 was designated on October 22, 1940, from SH 123 to Denhawken. On December 8, 1949, Spur 112 was cancelled and became an extension of FM 1347.

== Spur 113 ==
State Highway Spur 113
- Location: Freestone County
- Length: 0.935 mi (1,505 m)
- Existed: March 24, 1993–present

Spur 113 is located in Freestone County. It runs from US 84 southwest of Fairfield to the William R. Boyd Unit.

Spur 113 was designated on March 24, 1993, on the current route.

=== Spur 113 (1940) ===
State Highway Spur 113
- Location: Wilson County
- Existed: October 22, 1940–February 16, 1948

The original Spur 113 was designated on October 22, 1940, from SH 123 to Kosciusko. On February 16, 1948, Spur 113 was cancelled and became a portion of FM 541.

== Spur 114 ==
State Highway Spur 114
- Location: Freestone County
- Length: 0.670 mi (1,078 m)
- Existed: November 19, 1964–present

Spur 114 is located in Streetman. It runs from I-45 to SH 75 (old US 75).

Spur 114 was designated on November 16, 1964, on the current route.

=== Spur 114 (1940) ===
State Highway Spur 114
- Location: Jefferson County
- Existed: August 27, 1940–September 21, 1950

The original Spur 114 was designated on August 27, 1940, from US 96 at Woodworth Boulevard and 16th Street in Port Arthur along Woodworth Boulevard to the intersection of Proctor Street and Woodworth Boulevard. The route was to be signed as US 96 Business, rather than Spur 114, when construction on Spur 114 was completed. On September 21, 1950, the road was extended along Proctor Street and Houston Avenue (both also signed as US 96 Business) to US 96/SH 87 at 16th Street and Houston Avenue and the route was changed to Loop 114.

== Spur 115 ==
State Highway Spur 115
- Location: Hidalgo County
- Length: 6.891 mi (11.090 km)
- Existed: June 4, 1970–present

Spur 115 is located in Hidalgo County. It runs from Bus. US 83 (former Loop 374) in McAllen to US 281 (former Spur 241) in Hidalgo.

Spur 115 was designated on June 4, 1970, on the current route as a replacement of a section of FM 1926.

=== Spur 115 (1940) ===
State Highway Spur 115
- Location: Collin and Hunt counties
- Existed: November 22, 1940–March 26, 1942

The original Spur 115 was designated on November 22, 1940, from US 67 at or near Caddo Mills to Josephine. Spur 115 was cancelled on March 29, 1942, in exchange for being redesignated as FM 6.

== Spur 116 ==
State Highway Spur 116
- Location: Polk County
- Existed: December 19, 1940–March 6, 1941

Spur 116 was designated on December 19, 1940, from US 59 to New Willard. Three months later the road was extended to US 59 on the other side of New Willard and the route was changed to Loop 116.

== Spur 117 ==
State Highway Spur 117
- Location: Bexar County
- Length: 0.547 mi (880 m)
- Existed: April 14, 1980–present

Spur 117 is located in San Antonio. It begins at I-410 on the southeast side of the city. The route heads northwest along W.W. White Road for 0.55 miles (890 m) before ending at Loop 13 (Military Drive).

Spur 117 was designated on April 14, 1980, on the current route. Spur 117 was proposed for decommissioning in 2014 as part of TxDOT's San Antonio turnback proposal, which would have turned back over 129 miles of roads to the city of San Antonio, but the city of San Antonio rejected that proposal.

=== Spur 117 (1941) ===
State Highway Spur 117
- Location: Hill County
- Existed: February 4, 1941–April 8, 1952

Spur 117 was originally designated in Hill County on February 4, 1941, connecting Mount Calm to SH 31. The Spur 117 designation was cancelled on February 21, 1952, and its mileage was transferred to FM 1662 (later FM 737, now FM 339).

== Spur 118 ==
State Highway Spur 118
- Location: Denton County
- Existed: February 4, 1941–September 26, 1996

Spur 118 was designated on February 4, 1941, as a spur off Loop 118 in Roanoke to US 377. On September 26, 1996, Spur 118 became a portion of Loop 118 when it was rerouted onto the spur and the former portion of Loop 118 was removed and returned to the city of Roanoke.

== Spur 119 ==
State Highway Spur 119
- Location: Hutchinson County
- Length: 1.530 mi (2.462 km)
- Existed: February 4, 1941–present

Spur 119 is located in Hutchinson County. It runs from SH 139/SH 207 in Borger to Whitenburg Avenue in Phillips.

Spur 119 was designated on February 4, 1941, on the current route. On August 31, 1964, a 0.235-mile (0.378 km) section in Phillips was removed.

== Spur 121 ==
State Highway Spur 121
- Location: Brewster County
- Existed: May 29, 1941–February 20, 1946

Spur 121 was designated on May 29, 1941, from SH 227 to Terlingua as a replacement of a section of SH 118 (this section was formerly a spur of SH 227 before 1939). On February 20, 1946, Spur 121 was cancelled: a 0.4 mile portion in Big Bend National Park was turned over to the National Park Service and the remainder was removed from the highway system altogether. The route later became a portion of RM 2462 (now FM 170).

== Spur 122 ==
State Highway Spur 122
- Location: Bexar County
- Length: 5.664 mi (9.115 km)
- Existed: June 4, 1964–present

Spur 122 is located in San Antonio. It runs from Loop 13 to US 181.

Spur 122 was designated on June 4, 1964, from I-37 southeast of San Antonio east to then-US 181. On January 29, 1974, the route was transferred to US 181 and Spur 122 was reassigned to former US 181 from Loop 13 to US 181.

=== Spur 122 (1941) ===
State Highway Spur 122
- Location: Parmer County
- Existed: July 1, 1941–January 14, 1952

The original Spur 122 was designated on July 1, 1941, from US 60 to SH 86 in Bovina. On January 14, 1952, Spur 122 was cancelled and transferred to FM 1731.

== Spur 125 ==
State Highway Spur 125
- Location: Washington County
- Length: 0.601 mi (967 m)
- Existed: September 26, 1945–present

Spur 125 is located in Burton. It runs from US 290 east of Burton to FM 390 in Burton.

Spur 125 was designated on September 26, 1945, on the current route as a redesignation of Loop 125 when a section was transferred to FM 390.

== Spur 126 ==
State Highway Spur 126
- Location: Tom Green County
- Length: 0.225 mi (362 m)
- Existed: September 23, 1941–present

Spur 126 is located in San Angelo. It runs from FM 388 to FM 1223.

Spur 126 was designated on September 23, 1941, from US 87 (later Loop 378, now FM 1223) south of San Angelo to a connection with Avenue K in San Angelo. On March 29, 1988, a 0.1-mile (0.16 km) section from FM 388 north to Avenue K was removed from the highway system and returned to the city of San Angelo.

== Spur 128 ==
State Highway Spur 128
- Location: Karnes County
- Existed: October 24, 1941–May 19, 1970

Spur 128 was designated on October 24, 1941, from SH 123 to Cestohowa. On May 19, 1970, Spur 128 was cancelled and transferred to FM 3191.

== Spur 129 ==
State Highway Spur 129
- Location: Grayson County
- Length: 0.277 mi (446 m)
- Existed: September 26, 2002–present

Spur 129 is located in Whitesboro. It runs from US 377 at Locust Street to SH 56.

Spur 129 was designated on September 26, 2002, on the current route.

=== Spur 129 (1941) ===
State Highway Spur 129
- Location: Karnes County
- Existed: October 24, 1941–January 23, 1948

The first use of the Spur 129 designation was in Karnes County, from SH 123 to Panna Maria. Spur 129 was cancelled on January 23, 1948, and transferred to FM 886 (now FM 81).

=== Spur 129 (1962) ===
State Highway Spur 129
- Location: Wise County
- Existed: April 30, 1962–June 21, 1990

The next use of the Spur 129 designation was in Wise County, from SH 114 in Bridgeport east and north 1.1 miles (1.8 km) to SH 24. Spur 129 was cancelled on June 21, 1990, and transferred to Bus. US 380 (now Loop 373).

== Spur 131 ==
State Highway Spur 131
- Location: Gonzales County
- Length: 0.316 mi (509 m)
- Existed: January 18, 1960–present

Spur 131 is located in Gonzales. It runs from SH 97/US 90 Alt. to SH 97.

Spur 131 was designated on January 18, 1960, on the current route.

=== Spur 131 (1941) ===
State Highway Spur 131
- Location: Parker County
- Existed: November 24, 1941–March 26, 1942

The original Spur 131 was designated on November 26, 1941, from US 80 (now I-20) to Aledo. Spur 131 was cancelled on March 26, 1942, in exchange for being redesignated as FM 5 (now FM 1187).

== Spur 133 ==
State Highway Spur 133
- Location: Hardeman County
- Length: 3.055 mi (4.917 km)
- Existed: March 12, 1942–present

Spur 133 is located in Quanah. It runs from Loop 285 west of Quanah to FM 2568. There is a concurrency with SH 6.

Spur 133 was designated on March 12, 1942, from SH 283 at Third and Main Streets in Quanah, west along Third Street to US 287 (now Loop 285) west of Quanah as a redesignation of Loop 133. On August 31, 1967, a section along Nelson Street to FM 2568 was added, creating a concurrency with SH 283 (now SH 6).

== Spur 134 ==
State Highway Spur 134
- Location: Titus County
- Length: 0.470 mi (756 m)
- Existed: May 19, 1942–present

Spur 134 is located in Mount Pleasant. It runs from US 67 to US 271.

Spur 134 was designated on May 19, 1942, from US 67 west of Mount Pleasant to US 271 (now Bus. US 271) in the business district of Mount Pleasant. On July 2, 1964, the route was shortened to end at then-new US 271; the old route was replaced by FM 899 and rerouted US 271. On February 28, 2008, Spur 134 became a part of US 67, but was restored on June 26, 2014.

== Spur 135 ==
State Highway Spur 135
- Location: Newton County
- Length: 0.425 mi (684 m)
- Existed: August 26, 1969–present

Spur 135 is located in Newton County. It runs from FM 692 near Toledo Bend Dam to a parking lot near the dam.

Spur 135 was designated on August 26, 1969, on the current route.

=== Spur 135 (1942) ===
State Highway Spur 136
- Location: Brazos County
- Existed: May 20, 1942–August 19, 1965

The original Spur 135 was designated on May 20, 1942, from FM 60 (former SH 230) southeast 1 mile (1.6 km) along the southeast side of Easterwood Airport to the center of the airport. Spur 135 was cancelled on August 19, 1965, and became a portion of FM 2818.

== Spur 136 ==
State Highway Spur 136
- Location: Jefferson County
- Length: 3.200 mi (5.150 km)
- Existed: May 20, 1942–present

Spur 136 is located in Jefferson County. It runs from SH 347 north of Port Arthur to Port Neches.

Spur 136 was designated on May 20, 1942, from US 69, 2 miles (3.2 km) north of Port Arthur, northeast 5 miles (8.0 km) to Port Neches. On October 15, 1965, a 1.8-mile (2.9 km) section from SH 347 to US 69 was removed from the highway system as it was never built.

== Spur 137 ==
State Highway Spur 137
- Location: Hunt County
- Length: 0.400 mi (644 m)
- Existed: March 26, 2009–present

Spur 137 is located in Hunt County. It runs from US 380 northwest of Greenville to a cul-de-sac at a Kansas City Railroad line.

Spur 137 was designated on March 26, 2009, on the current route along a former routing of US 380.

== Spur 138 ==
State Highway Spur 138
- Location: Hunt County
- Length: 0.200 mi (322 m)
- Existed: March 26, 2009–present

Spur 138 is located in Hunt County. It runs from a cul-de-sac at a Kansas City Railroad line to US 380 northwest of Greenville.

Spur 138 was designated on March 26, 2009, on the current route along a former routing of US 380.

=== Spur 138 (1942) ===
State Highway Spur 138
- Location: Navarro County
- Existed: August 1, 1942–November 10, 1947

The first use of the Spur 138 designation was in Navarro County, from SH 31 to Dawson. Spur 138 was cancelled on November 10, 1947, and became a portion of FM 709.

=== Spur 138 (1960) ===
State Highway Spur 138
- Location: Denton County
- Existed: January 18, 1960–December 19, 1991

The next use of the Spur 138 designation was in Denton County. This route is now Business I-35.

== Spur 139 ==
State Highway Spur 139
- Location: Lamar County
- Length: 0.650 mi (1,046 m)
- Existed: January 25, 1962–present

Spur 139 is located in Paris. It runs from US 82/US 287/Loop 286 to FM 195.

Spur 139 was designated on January 25, 1962, on the current route along a former routing of Loop 286.

== Spur 140 ==
State Highway Spur 140
- Location: Hutchinson County
- Length: 0.777 mi (1,250 m)
- Existed: April 2, 1969–present

Spur 140 is located in Borger. It runs from SH 207 to Spur 119.

Spur 140 was designated on April 2, 1969, on the current route as a redesignation of Loop 140 when a section was removed from the highway system.

== Spur 143 ==
State Highway Spur 143
- Location: Collingsworth County
- Existed: August 23, 1943–August 7, 1951

Spur 143 was designated on August 23, 1943, from SH 203 at Quail to a point 1 mile (1.6 km) north. On August 7, 1951, Spur 143 was cancelled and became a portion of FM 1056.

== Spur 144 ==
State Highway Spur 144
- Location: Uvalde County
- Existed: August 15, 1961–present

Spur 144 is located in Uvalde. It runs from US 83 along N. Getty Street to FM 2369.

Spur 144 was designated on August 15, 1961, on the current route as a replacement of FM Spur 2369.

== Spur 145 ==
State Highway Spur 145
- Location: Burleson County
- Existed: December 16, 1943–December 18, 1953

Spur 145 was designated on December 16, 1943, from FM 60 to Snook. On December 18, 1953, Spur 145 was cancelled and transferred to FM 2155 (later FM Spur 2155).

== Spur 146 ==
State Highway Spur 146
- Location: Gonzales County
- Length: 2.237 mi (3.600 km)
- Existed: May 30, 1961–present

Spur 146 is located in Gonzales. It runs from US 90 Alt./FM 532 to SH 97/US 183.

Spur 146 was designated on May 30, 1961, from US 90 Alt. near eastern Gonzales west to US 183 (now Bus. US 183) in Gonzales along an old routing of US 90 Alt. On April 27, 1995, by district request, the road was extended to new US 183.

== Spur 147 ==
State Highway Spur 147
- Location: Tyler
- Length: 1.580 mi (2.543 km)
- Existed: January 18, 1944–present

Spur 147 is located in the city of Tyler and runs along West Gentry Parkway and East Gentry Parkway. It connects U.S. Route 69 / Texas State Highway 110 with U.S. Route 271 (US 271) / Texas State Highway 155.

Spur 147 was designated on January 18, 1944, from US 69 at Fenton Avenue and Queen Street along Bow Street to a point just east of Palace Avenue. On July 14, 1954, the road was extended east 0.8 miles (1.3 km) to Farm to Market Road 14 (FM 14). On May 31, 1965, the road was rerouted and extended east 0.2 miles (0.32 km) over a section of FM 14 to US 271.

== Spur 148 ==
State Highway Spur 148
- Location: Hudspeth County
- Length: 1.440 mi (2.317 km)
- Existed: February 11, 1944–present

Spur 148 is located in Fort Hancock. It begins at SH 20 and travels northeastward through Fort Hancock along Knox Avenue before ending at I-10 exit 72.

Spur 148 was designated on February 11, 1944, from US 80 (now SH 20) north to Fort Hancock. On September 6, 1963, the road was extended north 0.4 miles (0.64 km) to I-10.

== Spur 149 ==
State Highway Spur 149
- Location: Sabine County
- Existed: February 22, 1961–July 29, 1965

Spur 149 was designated on February 22, 1961, from then-US 96 in Brookeland to then-new US 96. On July 29, 1965, the road was extended south along old US 96 to new US 96 in Jasper County and the route was changed to Loop 149.

== Spur 150 ==
State Highway Spur 150
- Location: Knox County
- Existed: March 30, 1944–August 20, 1951

Spur 150 was designated on March 30, 1944, from SH 283 west 0.8 miles (1.3 km) to Truscott. On August 20, 1951, Spur 150 was cancelled and became a portion of FM 1756.

== Spur 151 ==
State Highway Spur 151
- Location: Grayson County
- Existed: May 18, 1944–January 26, 1946

Spur 151 was designated on May 18, 1944, from Denison to the then-new Denison Dam. On January 26, 1946, Spur 151 was cancelled and redesignated as SH 75A (now SH 91) as it connected with Oklahoma's OK-75A (now OK-91) at the state line.

== Spur 152 ==
State Highway Spur 152
- Location: Panola County
- Length: 1.181 mi (1.901 km)
- Existed: May 18, 1944–present

Spur 152 is located in Beckville. It runs from SH 149 to FM 959.

Spur 152 was designated on May 18, 1944, from SH 149 to Beckville. On December 13, 1962, the road was extended to FM 959.

== Spur 156 ==
State Highway Spur 156
- Location: Harrison County
- Length: 0.723 mi (1,164 m)
- Existed: January 14, 1963–present

Spur 156 is located in Waskom. It runs from I-20 to US 80.

Spur 156 was designated on January 14, 1963, on the current route.

=== Spur 156 (1944) ===
State Highway Spur 156
- Location: Freestone County
- Existed: September 14, 1944–July 15, 1948

The original Spur 156 was designated on September 14, 1944, from FM 27 to Kirvin. On September 9, 1947, the road was extended 2 miles to Woodland Cemetery. Spur 156 was cancelled ten months later and became a portion of FM 80; the extension to the cemetery became a portion of FM 1449 in 1957.

== Spur 158 ==
State Highway Spur 158
- Location: Williamson County
- Length: 2.076 mi (3.341 km)
- Existed: May 25, 2006–present

Spur 158 is located in Georgetown. Both of its termini are at I-35.

Spur 158 was designated on May 25, 2006, from RM 2338 north to I-35 as a replacement of a section of Business I-35-M. On May 31, 2012, the southern terminus was extended north 0.2 miles (0.32 km) to I-35, replacing a section of RM 2338.

The entire route is in Georgetown, Williamson County.

mi	km	Destinations	Notes
0.0	0.0	I-35 / RM 2338 west (Williams Drive) – Waco, Austin	I-35 exit 262
0.7	1.1	FM 971 east / Northwest Boulevard	
2.1	3.4	I-35 / Lakeway Drive / Inner Loop	I-35 exit 264
1.000 mi = 1.609 km; 1.000 km = 0.621 mi

== Spur 159 ==
State Highway Spur 159
- Location: Calhoun County
- Length: 2.300 mi (3.701 km)
- Existed: October 24, 1944–present

Spur 159 is located in Port Alto. It runs from SH 172 to CR 307.

Spur 159 was designated on October 24, 1944, on the current route.

== Spur 161 ==
State Highway Spur 161
- Location: Rains County
- Length: 0.428 mi (689 m)
- Existed: December 12, 1944–present

Spur 161 is located in Point. It runs from US 69 to FM 514.

Spur 161 was designated on December 12, 1944, from US 69 at Point north 0.5 miles (0.80 km) to Point School as well as 0.5 miles (0.80 km) south. Nine months later the section from US 69 south 0.5 miles (0.80 km) was cancelled because it was already part of FM 514.

== Spur 162 ==
State Highway Spur 162
- Location: Atascosa County
- Length: 2.140 mi (3.444 km)
- Existed: February 19, 1959–present

Spur 162 is north of Jourdanton. It runs from SH 97 to SH 16 (former SH 173).

Spur 162 was designated on February 19, 1959, on the current route.

=== Spur 162 (1945) ===
State Highway Spur 162
- Location: Upshur County
- Existed: January 11, 1945–July 16, 1949

The original Spur 162 was designated on January 11, 1945, from SH 26 to Ore City. On July 16, 1949, Spur 162 was cancelled and became a portion of FM 450.

== Spur 163 ==
State Highway Spur 163
- Location: Harris County
- Existed: February 27, 1945–March 24, 1954

Spur 163 was designated on February 27, 1945, from US 59 and S Main Street along US 59 Business to Houston. On March 24, 1954, Spur 163 was cancelled and replaced by a rerouted US 59.

== Spur 164 ==
State Highway Spur 164
- Location: Tyler
- Length: 1.000 mi (1.609 km)
- Existed: February 28, 1945–present

Spur 164 is a 1.000-mile (1.609 km) state highway spur in western Tyler. It is a two-lane roadway that is signed as Greenbriar Road; the road continues past both of Spur 164's termini as County Road 1125. State maintenance begins at Greenbriar Lake Road, approximately 0.5 miles (0.8 km) north of an intersection with Spur 364. The southern terminus is also at the entrance to the now-defunct Tyler State Fish Hatchery. The highway travels north, crossing the Union Pacific Railroad tracks, before ending at SH 31.

The road was designated as SH 140 in 1929. By 1935, the road was removed from the state highway system due to completion. Spur 164 was designated on February 28, 1945; its southern end has always been at its current location, as its purpose was to connect SH 31 to the Tyler State Fish Hatchery. Spur 364 was designated in 1962, but the Spur 164 designation was never extended to that route. The Texas Parks and Wildlife Department ceased maintaining the Hatchery in 1998; however, TxDOT continues to maintain the route. Spur 164 was originally located in west of Tyler in unincorporated Smith County, but Tyler's city limits have since been expanded to include the route.

== Spur 165 ==
State Highway Spur 165
- Location: Sabine County
- Length: 0.582 mi (937 m)
- Existed: July 29, 1965–present

Spur 165 is located in Brookeland. It runs from Loop 149 to Sam Rayburn Reservoir.

Spur 165 was designated on July 29, 1965, on the current route as a replacement of a section of FM 705.

=== Spur 165 (1945) ===
State Highway Spur 165
- Location: Parmer County
- Existed: April 30, 1945–May 22, 1948

The original Spur 165 was designated on April 30, 1945, from US 60 to Friona. On May 22, 1948, Spur 165 was cancelled and became a portion of FM 299 (now SH 214).

== Spur 169 ==
State Highway Spur 169
- Location: Kleberg County
- Length: 0.483 mi (777 m)
- Existed: August 24, 1945–present

Spur 169 is located in Kingsville. It runs from SH 41 to the entrance of Texas A&M University–Kingsville.

Spur 169 was designated on August 24, 1945, on the current route.

== Spur 171 ==
State Highway Spur 171
- Location: Orange County
- Existed: January 18, 1946–March 5, 1953

Spur 171 was designated on January 18, 1946, from US 90 (now Bus. US 90) in Orange to the DuPont Plant. On March 5, 1953, Spur 171 was cancelled and transferred to FM 1006.

== Spur 172 ==
State Highway Spur 172
- Location: Bell County
- Length: 0.809 mi (1,302 m)
- Existed: March 20, 1946–present

Spur 172 is located in Bell County. It runs from US 190/I-14 to the entrance of Fort Cavazos, formerly Fort Hood.

Spur 172 was designated on March 20, 1946, on the current route as a replacement of War Highway 1.

== Spur 174 ==
State Highway Spur 174
- Location: Madison County
- Length: 0.381 mi (613 m)
- Existed: May 15, 1946–present

Spur 174 is located in Madisonville. It runs from SH 90 to US 190.

Spur 174 was designated on May 15, 1946, from US 75 (now SH 75) along Shine Street to SH 90. On April 18, 1985, a 0.2-mile (0.32 km) section along South Street was transferred to SH 90 while Spur 174 was rerouted over old SH 90 along Madison Street to US 190.

== Spur 176 ==
State Highway Spur 176
- Location: Hill County
- Length: 0.147 mi (237 m)
- Existed: July 31, 1946–present

Spur 176 is located near Itasca. It runs from SH 81 (former US 81) to CR 4258.

Spur 176 was designated on July 31, 1946, on the current route.

== Spur 178 ==
=== Spur 178 (1946) ===
State Highway Spur 178
- Location: Travis County
- Existed: June 4, 1946–August 24, 1954

The first use of the Spur 178 designation was in Travis County, from 7th Street and Chicon Street in Austin, east crossing Gonzales Street, then southeast to US 290 near SH 29 with a connection to 6th Street. On January 14, 1949, US 290 was rerouted over all of Spur 178 except for the connection from 7th Street to 6th Street along Pedernales Street. Spur 178 was cancelled on August 24, 1954, and returned to the city of Austin due to rerouting of US 183.

=== Spur 178 (1958) ===
State Highway Spur 178
- Location: Hunt County
- Existed: August 28, 1958–Present

The next use of the Spur 178 designation was in Hunt County, from SH 11 south of Commerce, west along SH 11 Alternate and north along FM 513 to SH 24 in Commerce, replacing a section of FM 513. On May 1, 1965, the section from FM 513 to SH 24 was transferred to SH 50. On July 10, 1968, the road was extended west 1.7 miles (2.7 km) to then-proposed SH 24 (now SH 224) and north and northwest to SH 24 and the route was changed to Loop 178.

== Spur 180 ==
State Highway Spur 180
- Location: Hill County
- Length: 0.478 mi (769 m)
- Existed: July 21, 1961–present

Spur 180 is located in Whitney. It runs from SH 22 northeast of Whitney to FM 933 at Jefferson and N. Brazos Streets in Whitney.

Spur 180 was designated on July 21, 1961, as a replacement of Loop 180 when its southern section was transferred to FM 933.

== Spur 183 ==
=== Spur 183 (1946) ===
State Highway Spur 183
- Location: Mills County
- Existed: September 12, 1946–December 13, 1953

The first use of the Spur 183 designation was in Mills County, from US 84 south 0.5 miles (0.80 km) to Star. Spur 183 was cancelled on December 13, 1953, and transferred to FM 1047.

=== Spur 183 (1962) ===
State Highway Spur 183
- Location: Polk County
- Existed: January 25, 1962–August 1, 1963

The next use of the Spur 183 designation was in Polk County, from US 190 to the headquarters of the Alabama-Coushatta Indian Reservation. Spur 183 was cancelled on August 1, 1963, and transferred to FM 2865 (now PR 56).

== Spur 184 ==
State Highway Spur 184
- Location: Childress County
- Existed: March 18, 1947–October 9, 1973

Spur 184 was designated on March 18, 1947, from FM 94 (later FM 2042, now FM 3468), 2 miles (3.2 km) west of Childress, to Childress Army Air Field as a replacement of a section of War Highway 16. On October 9, 1973, Spur 184 was cancelled and became a portion of FM 164.

== Spur 185 ==
State Highway Spur 185
- Location: Titus County
- Length: 0.788 mi (1,268 m)
- Existed: April 30, 1947–present

Spur 185 is located in Winfield. It runs from US 67 to I-30.

Spur 185 was designated on April 30, 1947, on the current route.

== Spur 186 ==
State Highway Spur 186
- Location: Bastrop County
- Length: 0.179 mi (288 m)
- Existed: February 14, 1947–present

Spur 186 is located in Paige. It runs from CR 362 (old US 290) to US 290. The route is unsigned.

Spur 186 was designated on February 14, 1947, on the current route.

== Spur 188 ==
State Highway Spur 188
- Location: Lipscomb County
- Length: 0.412 mi (663 m)
- Existed: August 1, 1947–present

Spur 188 is located in Lipscomb. It runs from SH 305 to the courthouse in Lipscomb.

Spur 188 was designated on August 1, 1947, on the current route.

== Spur 189 ==
State Highway Spur 189
- Location: Callahan County
- Existed: April 30, 1947–May 26, 2005

Spur 189 was designated on April 30, 1947, from then-approved US 80 (now I-20) to old US 80 (now FM 18) in Clyde. On May 26, 2005, Spur 189 was cancelled by district request and returned to the city of Clyde.

== Spur 190 ==
State Highway Spur 190
- Location: Karnes County
- Length: 0.341 mi (549 m)
- Existed: September 9, 1947–present

Spur 190 is located in Gillett. It runs from SH 80 west of Gillett to Gillett.

Spur 190 was designated on September 9, 1947, on the current route.

== Spur 191 ==
State Highway Spur 191
- Location: Burnet County
- Length: 1.060 mi (1.706 km)
- Existed: October 25, 1947–present

Spur 191 is located in Spicewood. It runs from SH 71 (formerly RM 93) to Spicewood.

Spur 191 was designated on October 25, 1947, on the current route.

== Spur 192 ==
State Highway Spur 192
- Location: Ochiltree County
- Length: 1.310 mi (2.108 km)
- Existed: November 24, 1959–present

Spur 192 is located in Perryton. It runs from Loop 143, just west of US 83, to SH 15.

Spur 192 was designated on November 24, 1959, on the current route.

=== Spur 192 (1947) ===
State Highway Spur 192
- Location: Hill County
- Existed: September 9, 1947–April 22, 1958

The original Spur 192 was designated on September 9, 1947, from SH 171 to Bynum. On April 22, 1958, Spur 192 was cancelled and transferred to FM 1946.

== Spur 193 ==
State Highway Spur 193
- Location: Hill County
- Existed: September 9, 1947–June 24, 1952

Spur 193 was designated on September 9, 1947, from SH 171 to Malone. On June 24, 1952, Spur 193 was cancelled and transferred to FM 308.

== Spur 194 ==
State Highway Spur 194
- Location: Pecos County
- Length: 1.352 mi (2.176 km)
- Existed: December 10, 1946–present

Spur 194 is located in Fort Stockton. Known as Railroad Avenue within the city and Old Alpine Road (proposed FM 3531) beyond, it begins at a point southwest of Fort Stockton where TxDOT takes over maintenance of the former highway to Alpine from the county. The route begins as a two-lane road, then becomes a five-lane road with a center left-turn lane just outside the city limits. It runs to the northeast along the north side of the South Orient Rail Line before ending at US 385.

Most of Spur 194 follows the original alignment of US 67 between Fort Stockton and Alpine along Old Alpine Road from 1932 until the current US 67 roadway was constructed to the west sometime after 1940. Spur 194 was designated on December 10, 1946, following a longer 2.0-mile (3.2 km) route that began at its present southern terminus at a former stockyard near a railroad crossing and extended further along the present US 385 terminating at what was then US 290 (now Business I-10). In 1949, the stretch of the current US 385 south of US 290 was designated as FM 1214 over a route that eventually was extended to Marathon. On October 24, 1956, FM 1214 was incorporated into a southern extension of SH 51. On August 28, 1958, SH 51 was cancelled and changed to US 385, and Spur 194 was truncated to avoid a dual designation over US 385 on December 10, 1959.

== Spur 195 ==
State Highway Spur 195
- Location: Collin County
- Length: 1.000 mi (1.609 km)
- Existed: September 29, 2016–present

Spur 195 is located in Collin County. It runs from US 75 to SH 5.

Spur 195 was designated on September 29, 2016, on the current route as a replacement of a section of FM 543. It runs along Laud Howell Pkwy. It is located in McKinney.

=== Spur 195 (1947) ===
State Highway Spur 195
- Location: Wheeler County
- Existed: August 1, 1947–November 23, 1948

The first use of the Spur 195 designation was in Wheeler County, from US 83 to Briscoe. Spur 195 was cancelled on November 23, 1948, and became a portion of FM 1046.

=== Spur 195 (2013) ===
State Highway Spur 195
- Location: Collin County
- Existed: December 19, 2013–September 29, 2016

The next use of the Spur 195 designation was in Collin County, from FM 455 to CR 206 as a replacement of a section of FM 543. Spur 195 was cancelled on September 29, 2016, and changed back to FM 543.

== Spur 196 ==
State Highway Spur 196
- Location: Motley County
- Length: 0.781 mi (1,257 m)
- Existed: January 27, 1948–present

Spur 196 is located in Matador. It runs from SH 70 at Dundee Street along Dundee Street to US 62/US 70 at Willow Street.

Spur 196 was designated on January 27, 1948, on the current route.

== Spur 197 ==
State Highway Spur 197
- Location: Galveston County
- Length: 5.2 mi (8.4 km)
- Existed: September 27, 2012–present

Spur 197 is located in Texas City. It runs from 19th Avenue to SH 146.

Spur 197 was designated on September 27, 2012, on the current route as a replacement of a section of Loop 197 when its northern section was removed and returned to Texas City.

=== Spur 197 (1943) ===
State Highway Spur 197
- Location: Washington County
- Length: 0.39 mi (630 m)
- Existed: October 6, 1943–March 18, 1958

The original Spur 197 was designated on October 6, 1943, from FM 50 in Independence west 0.39 miles (0.63 km) to Old Baylor University Ruins as a replacement of a section of SH 211. Spur 197 was cancelled on March 15, 1958, and transferred to FM 390 and FM 390 Spur.

== Spur 199 ==
State Highway Spur 199
- Location: Atascosa County
- Length: 0.729 mi (1,173 m)
- Existed: June 23, 1981–present

Spur 199 is located southeast of Pleasanton. It runs west–east approximately 3/4 mile (1.2 km) along Leal Road from US 281 to I-37 exit 104.

Spur 199 was designated on June 23, 1981, on the current route.

=== Spur 199 (1947) ===
State Highway Spur 199
- Location: Cameron County
- Existed: December 17, 1947–June 30, 1961

A previous Spur 199 was designated on December 17, 1947, from then-approved US 77 northwest of San Benito south 1.5 miles (2.4 km) to Sam Houston Boulevard and Stenger Street in San Benito. Spur 199 was cancelled on June 30, 1961, and removed from the highway system due to completion of US 83.
