= Texas Park Road 72 =

PR 72
- PR 72 highlighted in red

Route information
- Maintained by TxDOT
- Length: 4.346 mi (6.994 km)
- Existed: 1978–present

Major junctions
- West end: FM 762 near Long Point
- East end: Brazos Bend State Park

Location
- Country: United States
- State: Texas
- Counties: Fort Bend

Highway system
- Highways in Texas; Interstate; US; State; Former; Toll; Loops; Spurs; FM/RM; Park; Rec
← PR 71	→ PR 73

Park Road 72 (PR 72) is a park road in Fort Bend County, Texas that begins at Farm to Market Road 762 (FM 762) and goes east into Brazos Bend State Park.

== Route description ==
PR 72 starts at FM 762 at the entrance of Brazos Bend State Park and goes east, entering the park. After 0.6 miles (1.0 km) the road comes to the ranger station where the park user fee is collected. Going southeast for 0.2 miles (0.3 km), the road passes the 40 Acre Lake parking lot. For 0.5 miles (0.8 km) PR 72 loops around the south end of a point of timber before it steadies on a straight easterly heading for 1.3 miles (2.1 km) through the woods. The road then angles to the northeast for 0.6 miles (1.0 km), passing a parking lot on the left. Near Creekfield Lake, a park drive branches off going north to some campgrounds. At this point, PR 72 veers sharply to the west for 0.7 miles (1.1 km) before ending in a 0.3 miles (0.5 km) long turnaround loop.

== History ==
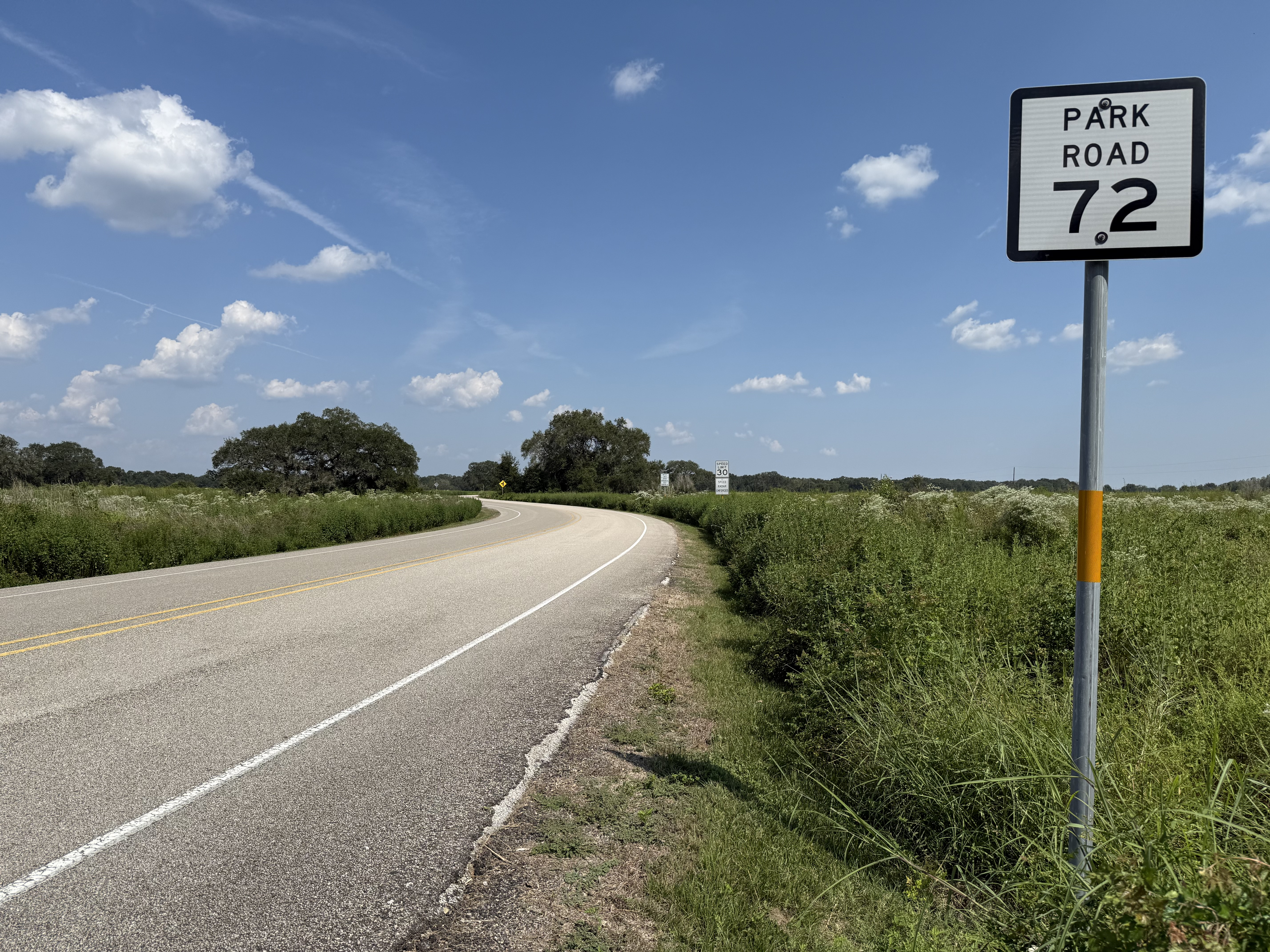
View along Park Road 72 entering Brazos Bend State Park just east of FM 762

PR 72 was originally designated on August 21, 1978 in Hale Ranch State Park in Fort Bend County. The road began at the park entrance on FM 762 and ran eastward about 4.4 miles (7.1 km).

The park's original name of Hale Ranch came from a hunting preserve belonging to Herman Hale, Joe Wesendoff and the Pilant Club of Houston. Hale Ranch is now part of Brazos Bend State Park. The park is located where Big Creek empties into the Brazos River.

== Major intersections ==
The entire highway is in Fort Bend County.

Location	mi	km	Destinations	Notes
Long Point	0.000	0.000	FM 762	Western terminus
Brazos Bend State Park	4.346	6.994	Turnaround loop	Eastern terminus
1.000 mi = 1.609 km; 1.000 km = 0.621 mi
