= List of war highways in Texas =

War Highways were designated in the U.S. state of Texas by the Texas State Highway Commission in 1942 and 1943 to serve military camps and military bases during World War II. All have since been cancelled or redesignated.

== War Highway 1 ==
War Highway 1 was designated on October 31, 1942, from US 190 northward 0.1 miles (0.16 km) to the main entrance of Camp Hood (was Fort Hood, now Fort Cavazos). This was cancelled six months after the war. At 819 feet (250 m), War Highway 1 was the shortest state highway in Texas at the time. On March 20, 1946, War Highway 1 was redesignated Spur 172.

== War Highway 2 ==
War Highway 2 was designated on October 31, 1942, from US 87 east 1.2 miles (1.9 km) to the main entrance of Camp Bullis. This was cancelled six months after the war.

== War Highway 3 ==
War Highway 3 was designated on October 31, 1942, from SH 6 northward 0.6 miles (0.97 km) to the main entrance of Camp Wallace. This was cancelled six months after the war, was later part of FM 1765, and is now part of FM 2004.

== War Highway 4 ==
War Highway 4 was designated on October 31, 1942, from SH 225 1.5 miles (2.4 km) east of Pasadena 1.9 miles (3.1 km) to the Todd Shipbuilding Plant. This was cancelled six months after the war.

== War Highway 5 ==
War Highway 5 was designated on October 31, 1942, from SH 290 (now SH 114) 9.5 miles (15.3 km) west of Lubbock, north 1.1 miles (1.8 km) to the Lubbock Advanced Flying School. On November 2, 1959, this was redesignated as Spur 309.

== War Highway 6 ==
War Highway 6 was designated on October 31, 1942, from SH 85 10 miles (16 km) north of Eagle Pass northward to the main entrance of the Air Force Training School. This was cancelled six months after the war.

== War Highway 7 ==
War Highway 7 was designated on October 31, 1942, from US 83 7 miles (11 km) south of Abilene west 5.2 miles (8.4 km) to the east boundary of Camp Barkeley. This was cancelled six months after the war, and was redesignated as FM 707 on December 10, 1946.

== War Highway 8 ==
War Highway 8 was designated on October 31, 1942, from US 81, 4.5 miles (7.2 km) northeast of Waco northeast 1.5 miles (2.4 km) to the Basic Training School. This was cancelled six months after the war, and is now FM 2417.

== War Highway 9 ==
War Highway 9 was designated on October 31, 1942, from SH 136 east to the west boundary of the Pan-Tex Ordnance Plant, and then south to US 60, a total distance of 6.7 miles (10.8 km). This was redesignated as FM 683 on April 9, 1946, part of which is now FM 245.

== War Highway 10 ==
War Highway 10 was designated on October 31, 1942, from SH 35 at the Jackson–Matagorda county line southward 5.3 miles (8.5 km) to Well Point. War Highway 10 served as access to Camp Hulen. This was cancelled six months after the war, and is now FM 3280.

== War Highway 11 ==
War Highway 11 was designated on November 24, 1942, from US 54 to the New Mexico state line. War Highway 11 served as access to Fort Bliss. This was cancelled six months after the war, and is now FM 3255.

== War Highway 12 ==
War Highway 12 was designated on November 24, 1942, from US 75 west 5.4 miles (8.7 km) to Camp Perrin. This was redesignated as FM 691 on April 16, 1946.

== War Highway 13 ==
War Highway 13 was designated on December 21, 1942, from SH 107 at Cantu, west and north 7.2 miles (11.6 km) to Moore Field. This was redesignated as FM 681 on April 16, 1946.

== War Highway 14 ==
War Highway 14 was designated on December 21, 1942, from US 80 west of Big Spring south 0.5 miles (0.80 km) to the north boundary of the Air Force Training School area. This was redesignated as FM 700 on November 8, 1946.

== War Highway 15 ==
War Highway 15 was designated on February 11, 1943, from the east entrance of Camp Hood east via Rancier Avenue to 8th Street (later FM 439). This was cancelled six months after the war, and is now part of FM 439.

== War Highway 16 ==
War Highway 16 was designated on March 8, 1943, from US 83 south of Childress west 2.3 miles (3.7 km) to the Air Force Bombardier School. On March 18, 1947, War Highway 16 was redesignated as Spur 184, which became part of FM 164 on October 9, 1973.

== War Highway 17 ==
War Highway 17 was designated on April 15, 1943, from US 271 near Clink Scales to SH 31 near Walton's Store. On September 9, 1947, War Highway 17 was redesignated as FM 757.

== War Highway 18 ==
War Highway 18 was designated on June 10, 1943, from US 70/US 287 in Wichita Falls 3.1 miles (5.0 km) to US 277 (now SH 240) in Sheppard Field. This became part of rerouted US 277, and is now Spur 325.

== War Highway 19 ==
War Highway 19 was designated on August 3, 1943, from SH 87 2 miles (3.2 km) southwest of Orange west 5.2 miles (8.4 km) to Orangefield. This was cancelled on June 11, 1945, and was redesignated as FM 409, which was replaced by FM 105 on January 29, 1953.

== War Highway 20 ==
War Highway 20 was designated on August 3, 1943, from SH 34 south of Greenville east to Majors Basic Field. This was cancelled six months after the war, and is now FM 1570.

== War Highway 21 ==
War Highway 21 was designated on November 16, 1943, from US 80 (now I-20) at Tye southward via the Camp Barkeley Air Support Command Base to SH 158 (now US 277) at Caps. This was cancelled six months after the war, and was redesignated as FM 708 (now part of FM 707) on December 10, 1946.
