= Crescent Heights, Texas =

- Unincorporated community
- Location within Texas Location within the United States
- Coordinates: 32°11′13″N 95°56′36″W
- Country: United States
- State: Texas
- County: Henderson
- Elevation: 417 ft (127 m)
- Time zone: UTC-6 (Central (CST))
  - Summer (DST): UTC-5 (CDT)
- Area codes: 430, 903
- GNIS feature ID: 1341554

Crescent Heights is an unincorporated community in Henderson County, located in the U.S. state of Texas.
