= Tornadoes of 2019 =

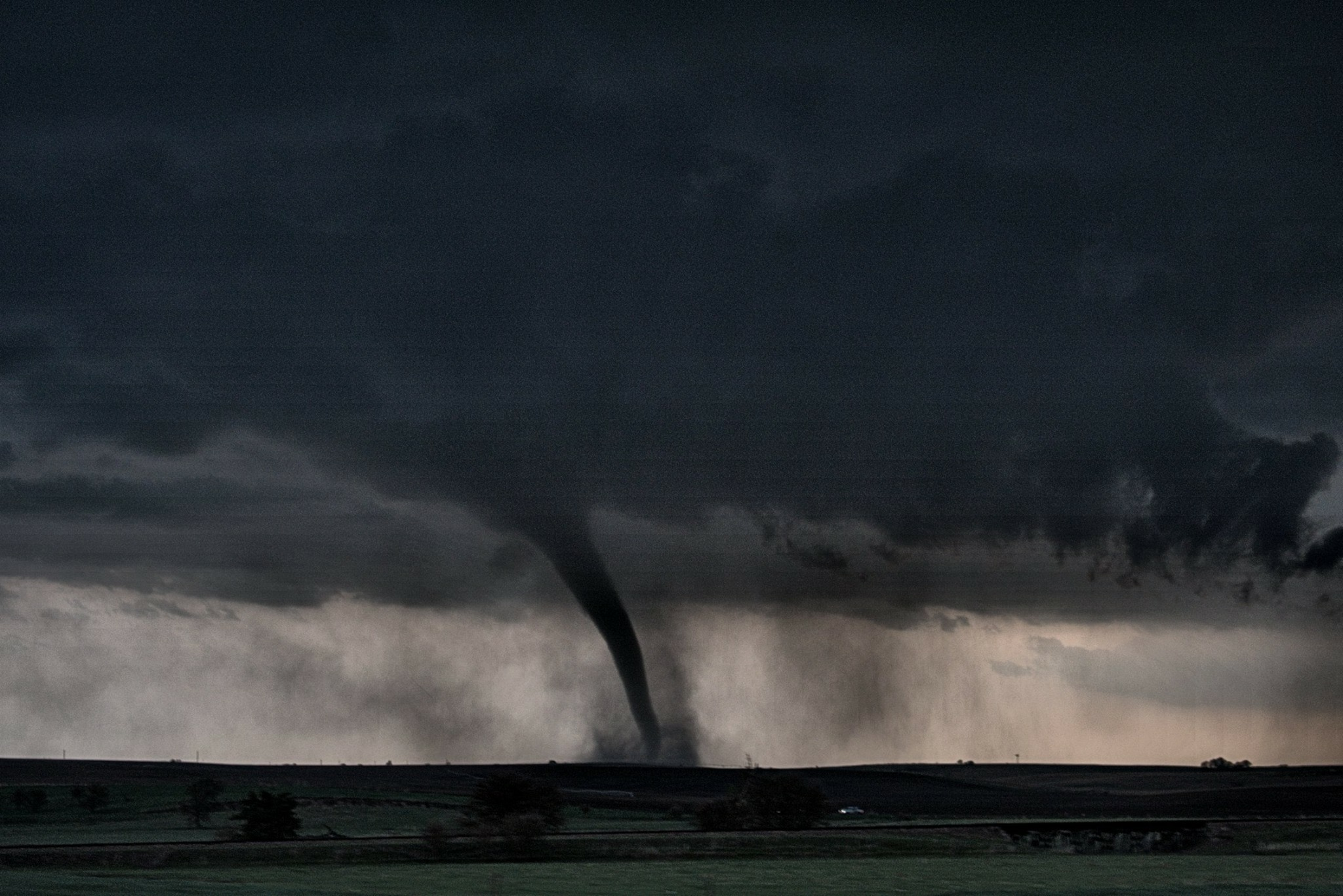
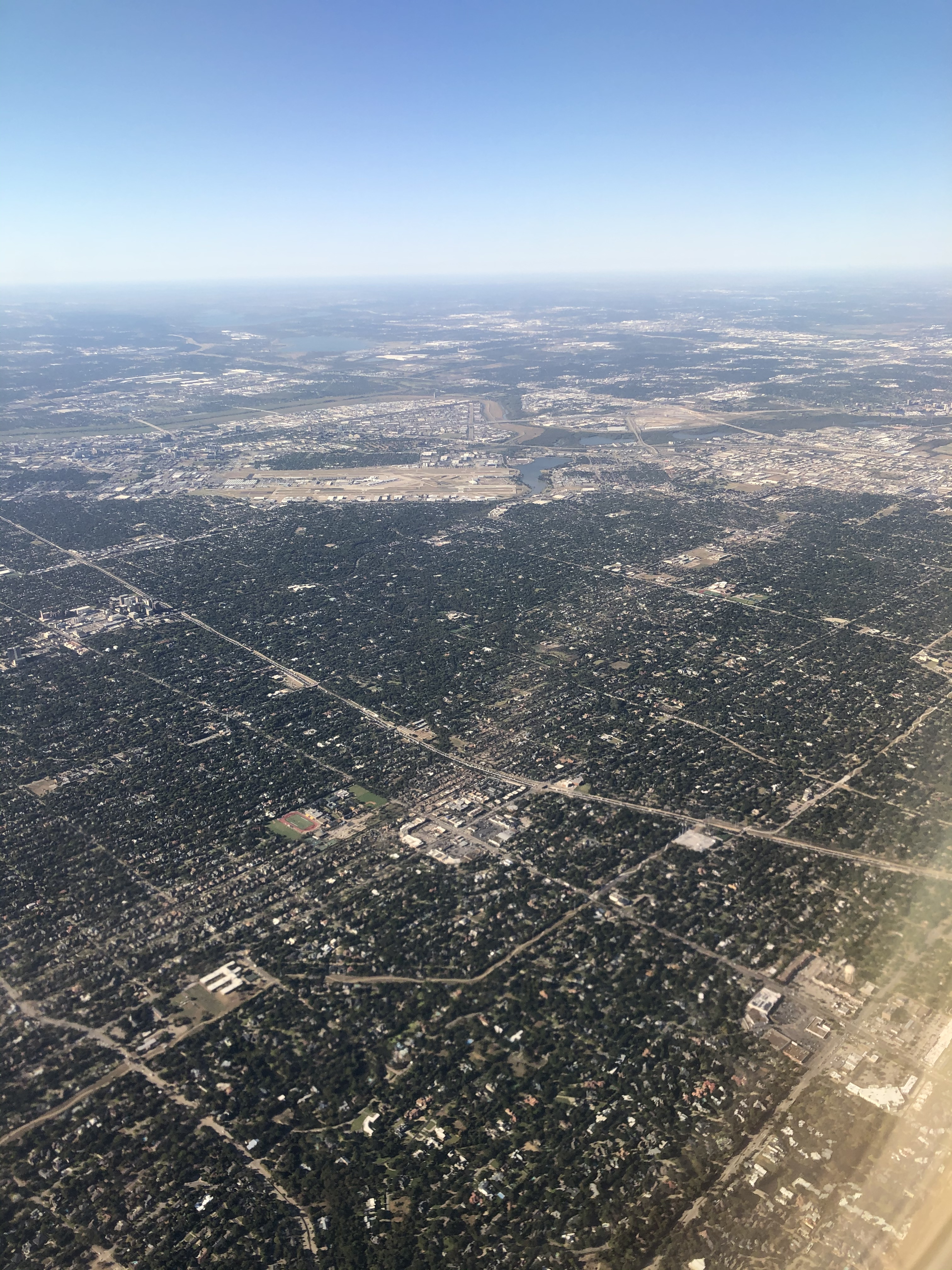
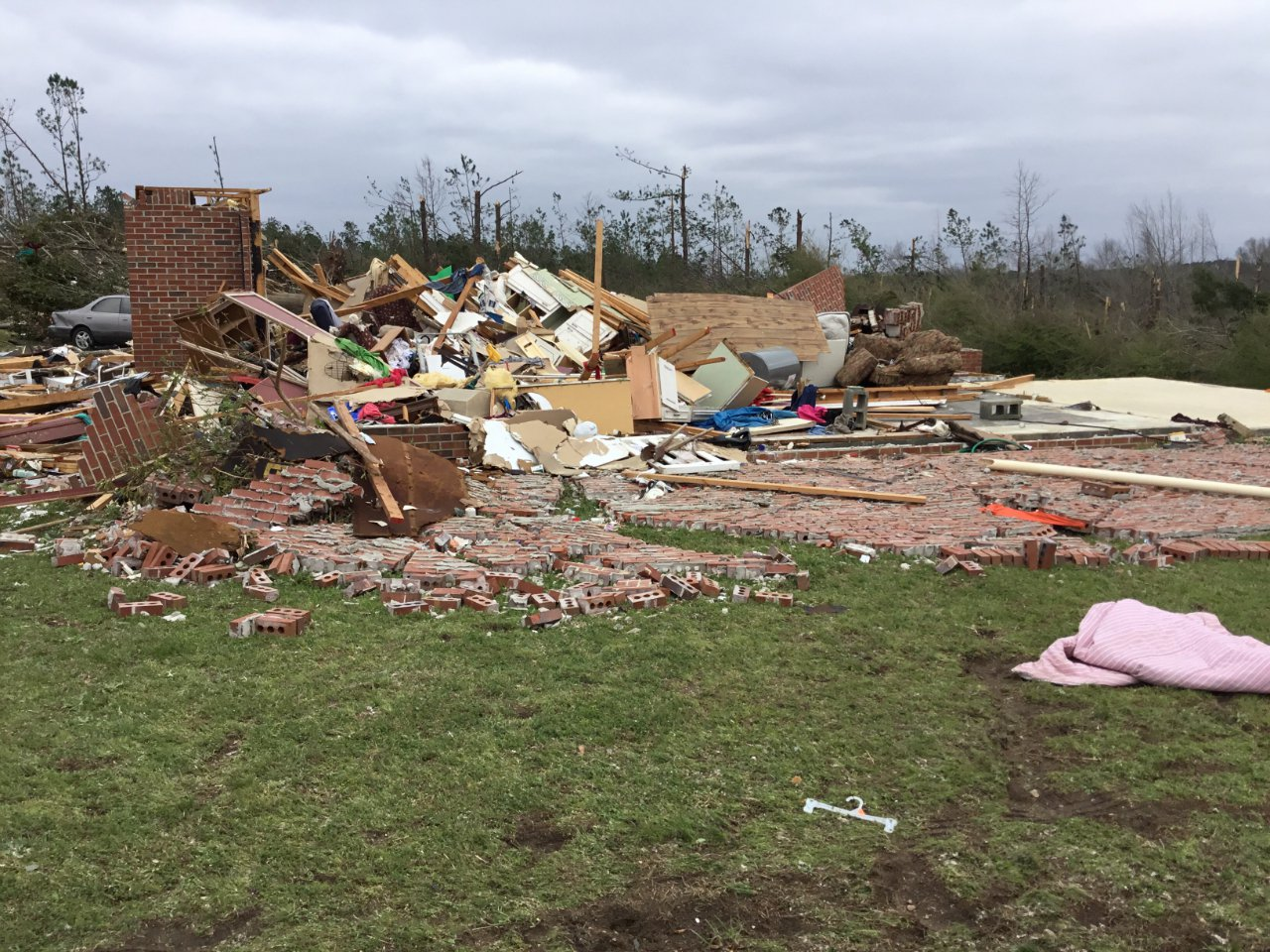
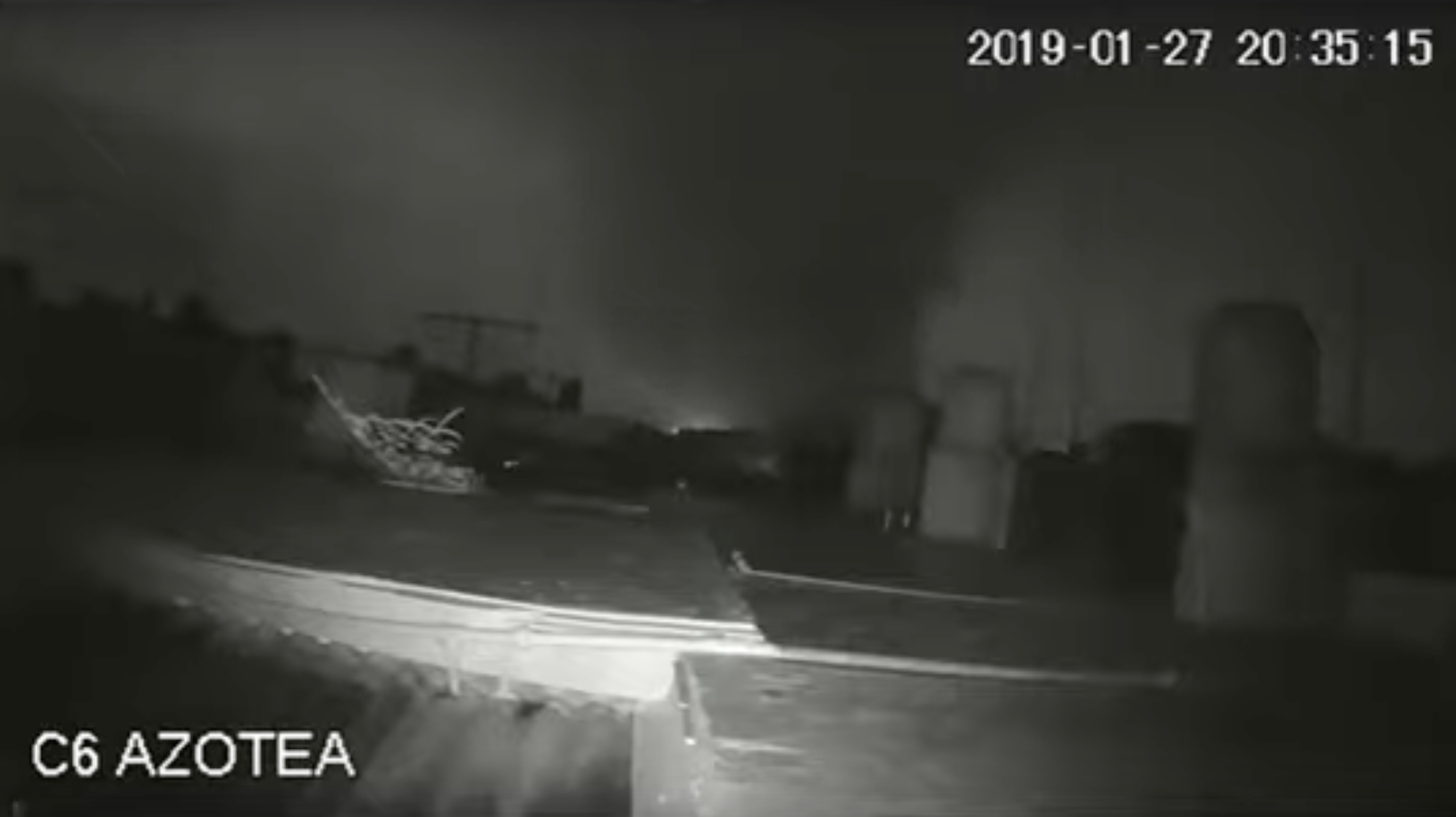
- Clockwise from top: A tornado near Farnam, Nebraska on May 17; NEXRAD loop of a supercell which produced an EF4 tornado in Linwood, Kansas on May 28; EF4 damage done to a well-anchored home near Beauregard, Alabama following a tornado on March 3; A violent EF4 stovepipe tornado in Havana, Cuba on January 27; Animation of tornadoes and tornado warnings during the Tornado outbreak of April 13-15; Path of damage caused by an EF3 tornado in Dallas, Texas on October 20.
- Timespan: January 4 – December 30
- Maximum rated tornado: EF4 tornado: Havana, Cuba on January 27; Beauregard, Alabama on March 3; Dayton, Ohio on May 27; Linwood, Kansas on May 28; Kaiyuan, China on July 3
- Tornadoes in U.S.: 1,529
- Damage (U.S.): > $4.184 billion
- Fatalities (U.S.): 42
- Fatalities (worldwide): 105

This page documents notable tornadoes and tornado outbreaks worldwide in 2019. Strong and destructive tornadoes form most frequently in the United States, Argentina, Brazil, Bangladesh, and Eastern India, but can occur almost anywhere under the right conditions. Tornadoes also develop occasionally in southern Canada during the Northern Hemisphere's summer and somewhat regularly at other times of the year across Europe, Asia, Argentina, and Australia. Tornadic events are often accompanied by other forms of severe weather, including strong thunderstorms, strong winds, and hail.

There were 1,676 preliminary filtered reported tornadoes and 1,529 confirmed tornadoes in the United States in 2019. This made 2019 the fifth most active season on record, behind 2008, 2011, 2024, and 2004. Worldwide, 105 tornado-related deaths were confirmed; 42 in the United States, 28 in Nepal, 18 in China, eight in Cuba, two each in South Africa, Turkey, and Indonesia, and one each in Chile, Italy, and Japan.

== Events ==
=== United States ===
Confirmed tornadoes by Enhanced Fujita rating
EFU	EF0	EF1	EF2	EF3	EF4	EF5	Total
179	655	540	119	33	3	0	1,529

A map of 2019 United States tornado paths from the results of storm surveys.

A chart of the 2019 United States tornado count estimated from the number of preliminary reports

Fatal United States tornadoes in 2019
- Approximate touchdown location of killer tornadoes in 2019 Summary of tornadoes: February 23 – Mississippi (1 death); March 3 – Alabama, Georgia (23 deaths); April 13 – Texas (2 deaths); April 13 – Mississippi (1 death); April 25 – Louisiana (2 deaths); April 30 – Oklahoma (2 deaths); May 22 – Iowa (1 death); May 22 – Missouri (3 deaths); May 22 – Missouri (1 death); May 25 – Oklahoma (2 deaths); May 27 – Ohio (1 death); December 16 – Louisiana (1 death); December 16 – Alabama (2 deaths); Total fatalities: 42

== January ==
=== January 11–12 (Indonesia) ===
On January 11, three tornadoes formed in West Java, Indonesia. The first tornado struck Karawang with unknown intensity, damaging 21 to 25 homes in East Kopo Village and another 10 homes in Tegaljaya Village. One person was injured during this tornado. The second and third tornadoes struck Rancaekek, Bandung and damaged more than 640 houses, injuring two people. On January 12, a tornado struck Sukabumi damaging 89 homes.

=== January 19 (United States) ===
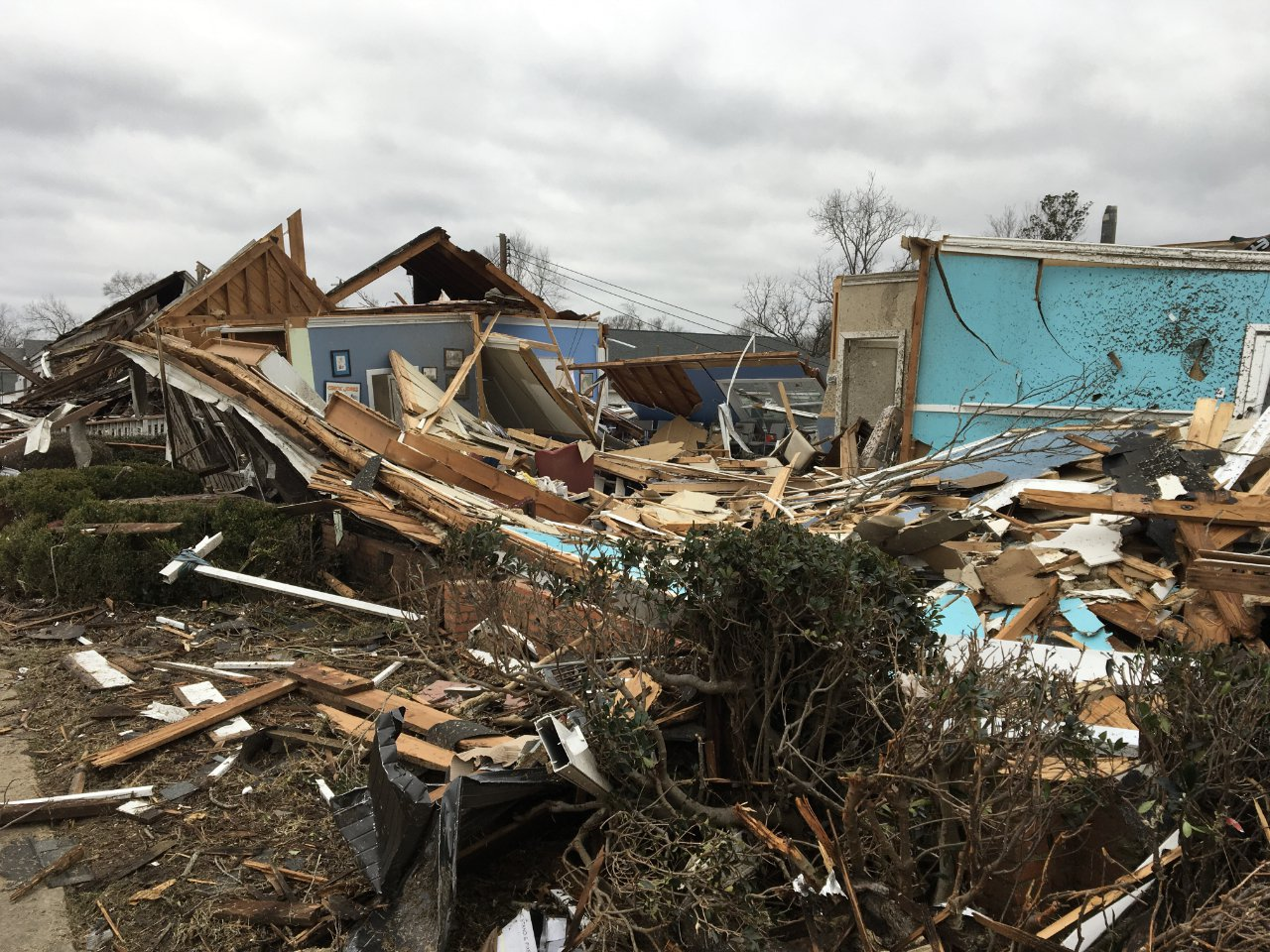
High-end EF2 damage to the First Presbyterian Church in Wetumpka, Alabama.

EFU	EF0	EF1	EF2	EF3	EF4	EF5
1	2	8	1	0	0	0

On January 19, the Storm Prediction Center issued a slight risk of severe weather for much of Mississippi and Alabama, along with parts of Louisiana, Georgia, and the Florida Panhandle. This included a 5% risk of tornadoes. A small tornado outbreak impacted the Deep South later that day. Five weak tornadoes struck Mississippi and Louisiana in the morning hours, including an EF1 tornado that destroyed a mobile home and a storage building and caused considerable roof damage to surrounding homes to the northeast of Franklinton, Louisiana. A high-end EF2 tornado caused significant structural damage in Wetumpka, Alabama. The First Presbyterian Church was destroyed, along with the First Baptist Church, the police station, a senior center, and several homes were severely damaged or destroyed. Four people were injured. An EF1 tornado near Booth, Alabama destroyed a trailer, injuring two people inside. Three other EF1 tornadoes touched down in Alabama and the Florida Panhandle, including one that caused damage at Tyndall Air Force Base. Overall, this outbreak produced 10 tornadoes and resulted in six injuries.

=== January 24 (Indonesia) ===
In Sukoharjo, Middle Java, a tornado touched down and unroofed or caused significant roof damage to 50 houses in Sukoharjo, and to 25 others both in Jetis and Gayam. Four houses were also damaged by falling trees. In Maluku Tenggara, a waterspout come ashore, damaging eight homes, three of them severely, and severely damaging the dome of a mosque.

=== January 24 (Turkey) ===
FU	F0	F1	F2	F3	F4	F5
0	0	1	3	0	0	0

On January 24, Turkey was impacted by four tornadoes. Two people were killed and 11 injured by an F2 tornado in the Kumluca area of Antalya Province, where homes and businesses sustained major damage. Several vehicles and trailers were tossed and damaged by the tornado as well. One of the fatalities occurred when a man attempted to take shelter inside a metal cargo container at a construction site, while the other occurred as a result of a collapsed roof. Another F2 tornado flattened a large swath of trees in a heavily forested area near Olympos, while an F1 tornado near Kum damaged homes and greenhouses. In Sahilkent, an F2 tornado caused significant damage to vehicles as well.

=== January 27 (Cuba) ===
Security camera footage of a violent EF4 tornado that struck Havana, Cuba on January 27, 2019.

An unusual violent nighttime EF4 tornado struck the eastern side of Havana, Cuba's capital city, killing eight people and injuring 190 others, some critically. The large stovepipe tornado caused widespread major damage as it moved through densely populated areas of the city. Numerous well-built masonry homes and businesses were badly damaged or destroyed, including 90 homes that completely collapsed, and more than 3,500 homes that were badly damaged or partially collapsed. Concrete frame structures sustained major damage, and vehicles were thrown into or crushed by falling debris, or were tossed and mangled beyond recognition. Numerous trees and power poles were snapped as well. This was the strongest tornado to strike Cuba in nearly 80 years, since an F4 tornado struck Bejucal on December 26, 1940.

== February ==
=== February 7 (India) ===
A Large tornado struck Faridabad, Haryana, a satellite city of New Delhi(India's Capital), causing downed trees, roof damage and some other Major damage. Along with the tornado, New Delhi, Faridabad and nearby cities, towns and villages, were hit by a hailstorm which caused 40 injuries, and also a rainstorm which caused New Delhi to get 30 millimetres of rain, which is more than the average 15 millimeters of rain New Delhi gets in the month of February.

=== February 23–24 (United States) ===
EFU	EF0	EF1	EF2	EF3	EF4	EF5
0	3	3	1	1	0	0

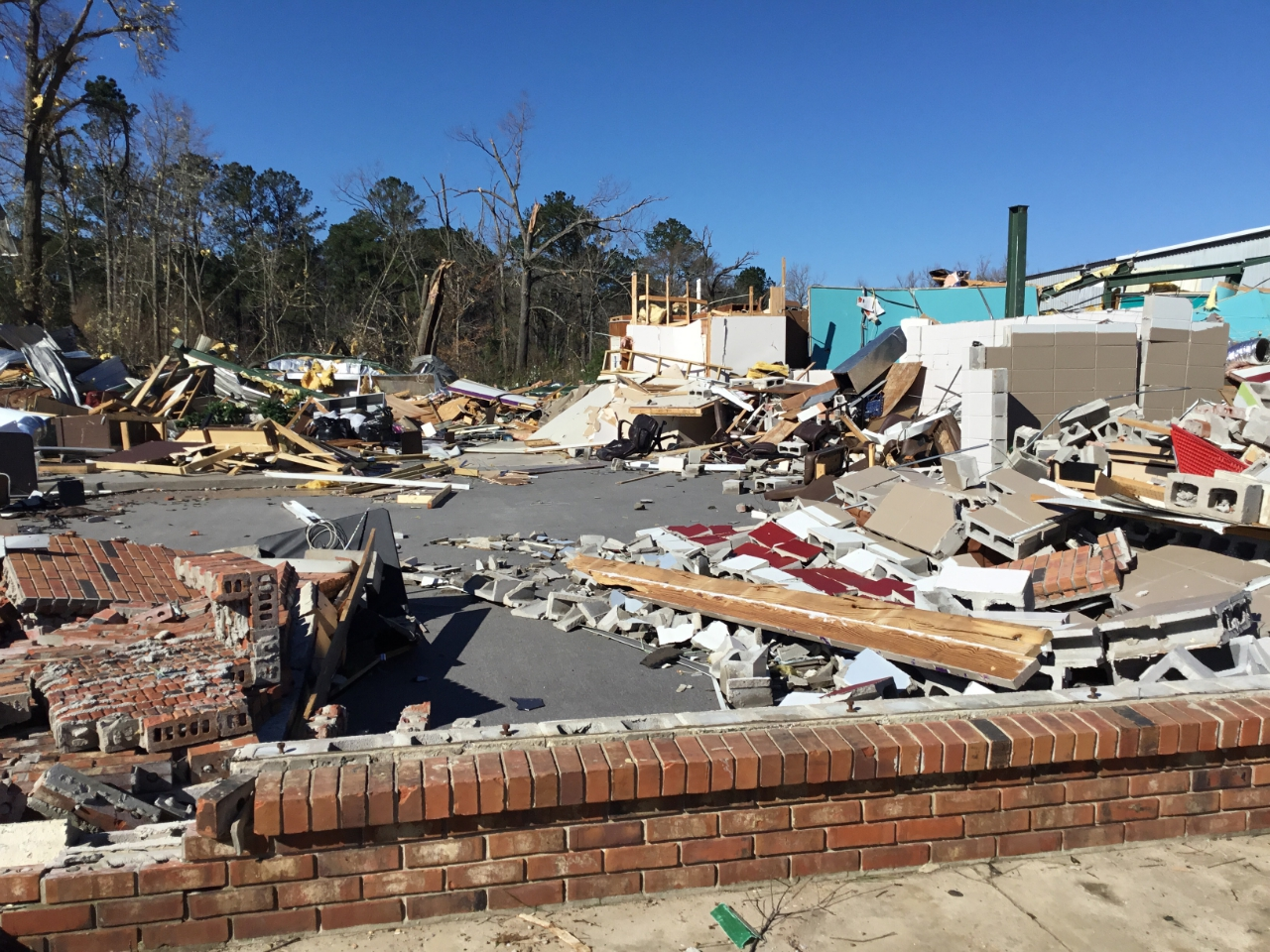
EF3 damage to a grocery store in Columbus, Mississippi. One person was killed at this location.

On the morning of February 23, the Storm Prediction Center issued a moderate risk of severe weather. This included a 15% hatched risk area for tornadoes. The possibility of a few strong, long-tracked tornadoes was noted. On the evening of February 23, through the early morning hours of February 24, a small tornado outbreak occurred in portions of Mississippi, Alabama and Georgia. A large, rain-wrapped EF3 tornado touched down and struck the city of Columbus, Mississippi, damaging or destroying numerous homes and businesses in town. A church was largely destroyed, and the top of a cell tower was bent over. A large brick grocery store building was almost entirely leveled, resulting in one fatality. Nineteen other people were injured by the tornado. An EF2 tornado also caused considerable damage to homes and trees as it clipped the west edge of Burnsville, Mississippi. In addition, an EF1 tornado near Kingville, Alabama downed hundreds of trees and destroyed a manufactured home. Overall, this outbreak produced eight tornadoes, killed one person, and resulted in 19 injuries. The storm caused $1.4 billion in damage.

== March ==
=== March 3 (United States) ===
EFU	EF0	EF1	EF2	EF3	EF4	EF5
0	11	21	7	1	1	0

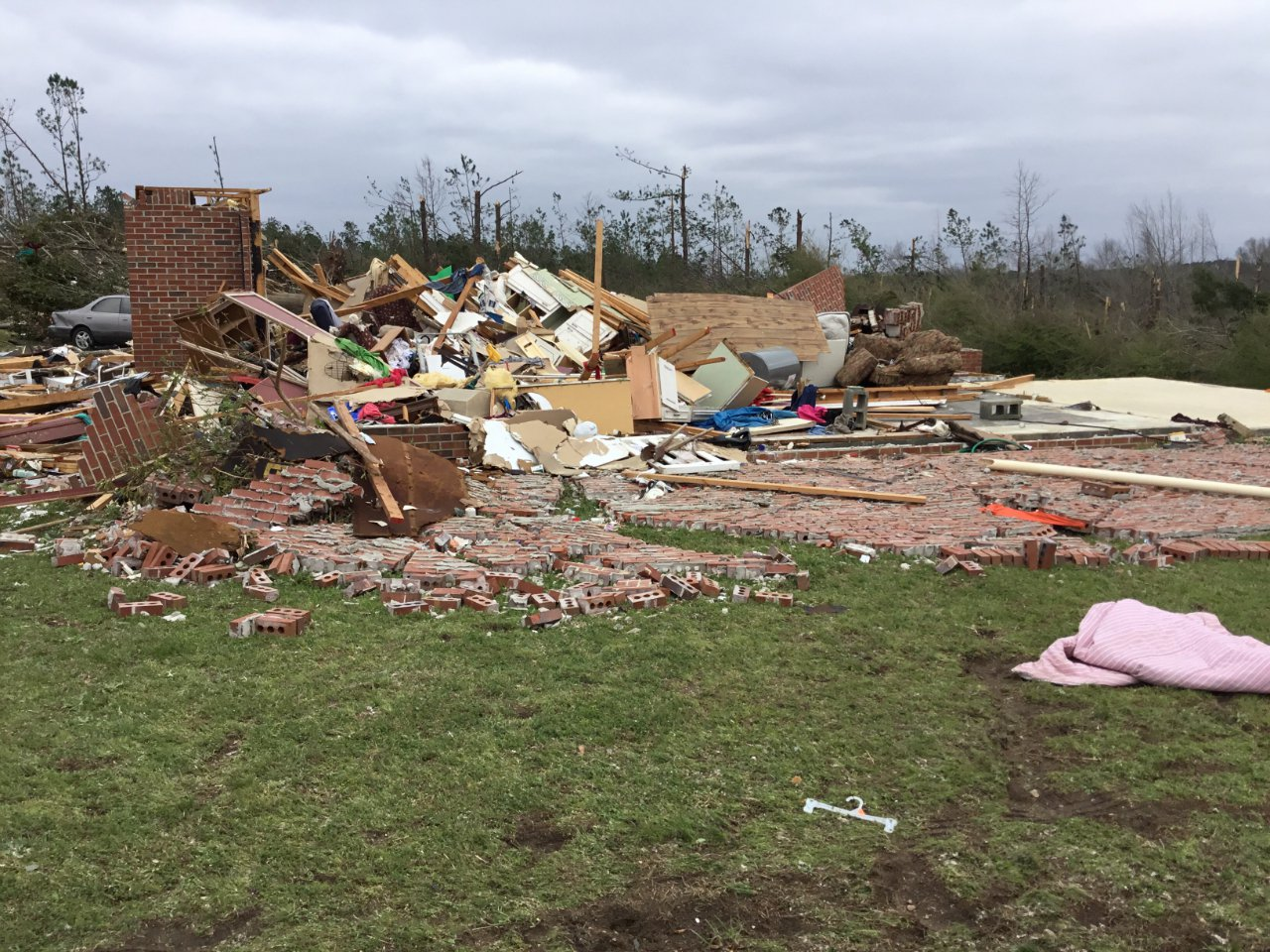
EF4 damage to a well-built brick home in Beauregard, Alabama. This home was anchor-bolted to its foundation.

On March 1, parts of Alabama, Georgia, Florida, and South Carolina were highlighted in a slight risk for severe weather by the Storm Prediction Center. On March 2, during the evening updated outlook, the Storm Prediction Center issued an enhanced risk from easternmost Alabama, extending through central Georgia and into western South Carolina due to the risk of a few strong tornadoes. On March 3, the Storm Prediction Center maintained the enhanced risk area, which included a 10% hatched risk area for tornadoes. Later that afternoon and evening, a tornado outbreak occurred across parts of Alabama, Georgia, Florida, and South Carolina as numerous tornadic supercell thunderstorms overspread the region. A violent, long-tracked EF4 tornado killed 23 people as it decimated the rural community of Beauregard in Lee County, Alabama. Well-built homes were leveled, trees were debarked, and vehicles were lofted and mangled beyond recognition by this violent tornado. The tornado continued through western portions of Georgia, striking Talbotton at EF3 strength and causing major damage in that town before dissipating. In addition to the 23 fatalities, 97 people were injured by the tornado. The Beauregard tornado ended the record-long 673-day streak without a violent (EF4 or EF5) tornado in the United States since the last one touched down near Canton, Texas on April 29, 2017. It was also the deadliest tornado to strike the United States since the 2013 Moore tornado.

Near Eufaula, a high-end EF2 tornado caused major damage to structures and aircraft at Weedon Field, and also destroyed a fire station. Another EF2 tornado caused significant damage to homes, mobile homes, and vehicles near Fort Valley, Georgia, injuring one person. The town of Cairo, Georgia was also significantly impacted by an EF2 tornado, where homes and businesses were severely damaged and two people were injured. In Florida, two people were injured when an EF3 tornado destroyed multiple homes to the east of Tallahassee. In South Carolina, an EF2 tornado snapped large trees and power poles, damaged a gas station, and injured four people near Clarks Hill. Numerous weak tornadoes also touched down, including an EF0 tornado that struck downtown Macon, Georgia. Overall, this outbreak produced 41 tornadoes and killed 23 people. All of the fatalities from this outbreak occurred in Lee County, Alabama as a result of the long-tracked EF4 tornado that struck Beauregard.

=== March 12–14 (United States) ===
EFU	EF0	EF1	EF2	EF3	EF4	EF5
0	20	13	5	0	0	0

A three-day tornado outbreak affected various regions of the United States during mid-March 2019. On March 12, an EF2 tornado impacted the city of Dexter, New Mexico. The tornado damaged or destroyed several homes and mobile homes in town, injuring 6 people. It was the earliest EF1 or stronger tornado in the state of New Mexico on record and also the first tornado in Chaves County during the month of March going back to 1959. Another EF2 snapped numerous power poles near Malaga as well. Over the course of March 13, a few weak tornadoes touched down in parts of Texas, including an EF0 and an EF1 that struck the town of Junction, resulting in moderate damage. Another EF1 tornado blew off roofs in Zephyr. On March 14, the Storm Prediction Center (SPC) issued an enhanced risk of severe weather from northern Indiana and northwestern Ohio southward into northern Alabama. The most notable tornado of the day was a strong EF2 tornado that caused major structural damage to several homes and a church near Lovelaceville, Kentucky, before weakening and striking West Paducah, where a mall and several businesses sustained minor damage. The tornado narrowly missed the National Weather Service office in Paducah, and was caught on video by a meteorologist on duty. Another EF2 tornado struck the small town of Vernon, Michigan, where homes had roofs and exterior walls removed and a business was destroyed. Many tornadoes touched down in Alabama on the evening of March 14, almost all of which were weak. However, an EF2 that passed near Titus severely damaged multiple homes and two convenience stores. Numerous other EF0 and EF1 tornadoes touched down in parts of Kentucky, Indiana, Michigan and Ohio as well. Overall, this outbreak produced 38 tornadoes and injured eight people.

=== March 13 (Germany) ===
On March 13, an F3 tornado touched down in extreme western Germany, very close to the border of Belgium, causing a swath of major tree damage as it moved through heavily wooded areas. The tornado struck the town of Roetgen directly, where 40 homes were damaged, 10 of which were left uninhabitable. Two of these homes had their roofs completely destroyed, and several others sustained partial roof removal. Detached garages were destroyed, and structural debris and insulation was scattered throughout the damage path. Some debris was impaled into the exterior walls of damaged homes. Trees were snapped and uprooted, and metal street lamp poles were bent to the ground. Two office buildings had their roofs torn off and windows shattered, and vehicles were damaged by flying debris and falling trees as well. Five people were injured in Roetgen, four of which required hospitalization. As the tornado moved through forests outside of Roetgen, it completely mowed down swaths of trees, and large trees were snapped and stripped of their limbs. The tornado was initially rated F2, but was later upgraded to F3 after re-assessment of the intense tree damage that occurred outside of town.

=== March 31 (Nepal) ===
On March 31, a destructive and deadly tornado tore through several villages of the Bara District and Parsa District of Nepal, killing 28 people and injuring 1,176 others. It was the country's first ever confirmed tornado, and was estimated to have been EF2 or EF3 in intensity. Most of the dead and injured were poor and living in weakly built houses that were destroyed. However, several well-constructed masonry structures, including a mosque, were completely leveled. A total of 1,273 homes were destroyed and a further 1,348 sustained damage. The majority of damage took place in Bara where 1,183 homes were destroyed. Vehicles were thrown, and numerous trees were snapped and denuded as well.

== April ==
=== April 13 (China) ===
EFU	EF0	EF1	EF2	EF3	EF4	EF5
1	0	0	0	1	0	0

On the afternoon of April 13, 2019, two tornadoes affected the Guangdong and Hainan Provinces in China. One tornado reached EF3 intensity as it slammed directly into He'an City in Guangdong Province, killing 1 person and injuring 5. The tornado began at 14:09 local time and moved due southwest. Several trees were snapped outside of town at EF1 strength before the tornado reached EF3 intensity in the town. Several homes had their roofs removed and some of their walls collapsed, and many metal power poles were snapped as well. A wind speed of 50.7 meters per second (113 mph) was recorded by an automatic weather station as the tornado passed through the city. The tornado was also caught on camera by a local resident. The tornado weakened further as it exited the town, before dissipating shortly afterward at 14:18 local time. During the main EF3 tornado, another tornado, that was not given a rating occurred in Hainan Province.

=== April 13–15 (United States) ===
EFU	EF0	EF1	EF2	EF3	EF4	EF5
0	23	31	15	2	0	0

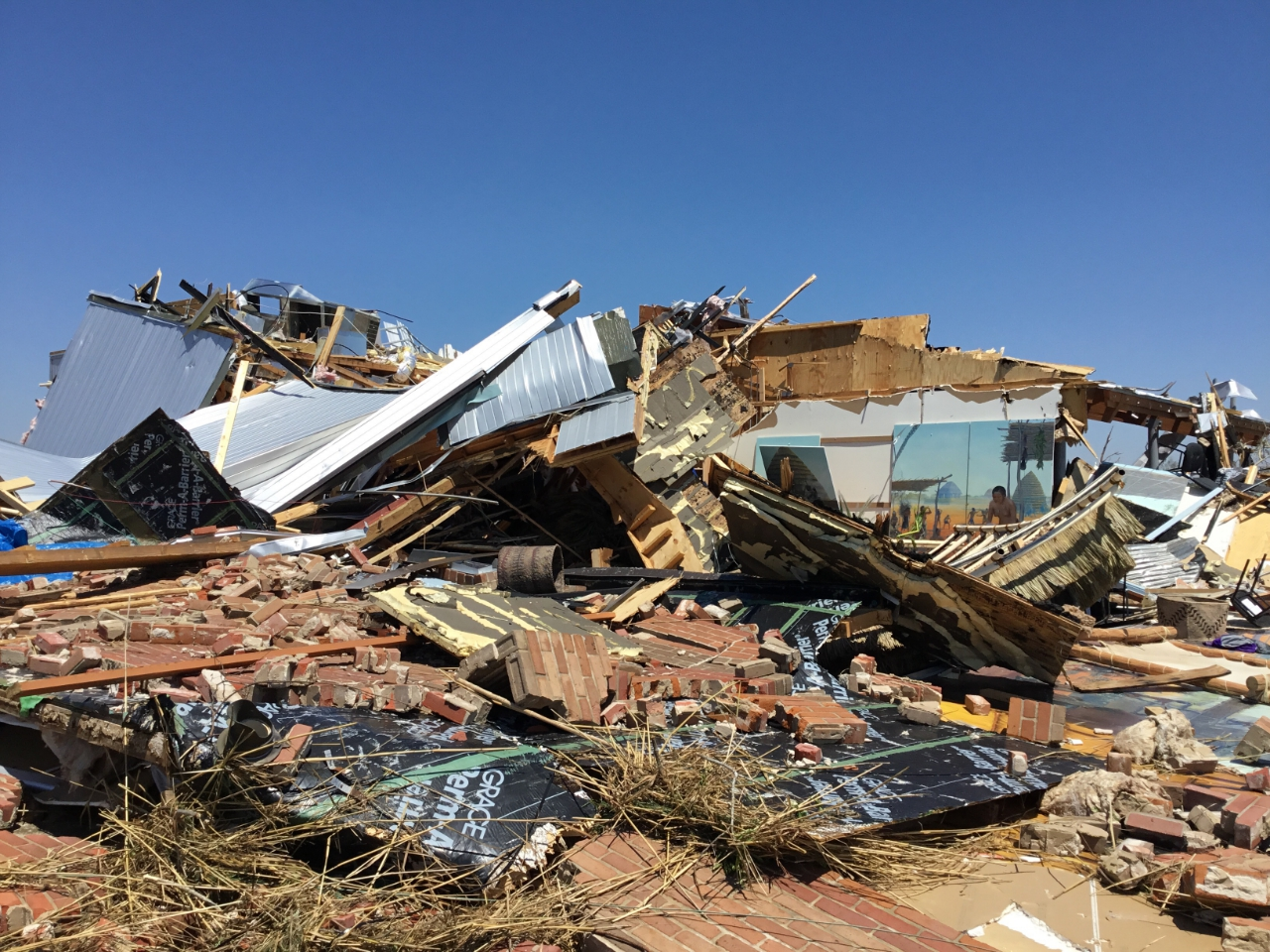
EF3 damage to the Caddo Mounds State Historic Site museum in Weeping Mary, Texas. One person was killed here and several others were injured.

On April 13, the Storm Prediction Center issued a moderate risk of severe weather for much of Louisiana, along with portions of Texas, Arkansas, and Mississippi. This included a 15% hatched risk area for tornadoes. A highly sheared and unstable atmosphere in place over much of the Southern United States provided a favorable environment for supercells and tornadoes, including the potential for strong, long-tracked tornadoes. Throughout the afternoon and evening, a tornado outbreak unfolded as multiple significant tornadoes tracked through the outlined threat area. An EF3 tornado severely impacted the town of Franklin, Texas, destroying numerous homes and businesses, and injuring 12 people. Another long-tracked EF3 tornado struck Weeping Mary and Alto, destroying numerous homes and the Caddo Mounds State Historic Site museum, killing two people and injuring 20 more. Alto had also sustained significant damage from a separate EF2 tornado that occurred earlier in the day. Three separate EF2 tornadoes struck Vicksburg, Mississippi, damaging homes and businesses. A high-end EF2 tornado also impacted Hamilton, destroying homes and a fire station, and killing one person there. After the high-end EF2 tornado, another EF2 tornado impacted areas near Greenwood Springs, Mississippi. In a later analysis, published in the Monthly Weather Review, it was noted "this tornado produced forest devastation and electrical infrastructure damage up to at least EF4 intensity" with winds up to 182 mph, which would make it the strongest tornado of the outbreak. Severe storms and tornadoes continued overnight into April 14 as the system pushed eastward, and an enhanced risk of severe weather was issued for parts of the Eastern United States, included a large 5% risk area of tornadoes extending from Georgia up to Pennsylvania. Widespread tornado touchdowns occurred in the threat area, though most were weak. However, an EF2 tornado struck Shelby, Ohio, where a Chevrolet dealership and several homes were significantly damaged, and six people were injured. A high-end EF2 tornado struck Starbrick, Pennsylvania as well, where a lumber company sustained major damage. A few additional tornadoes occurred into the early morning hours of April 15, including an EF2 tornado that caused severe damage to homes and a warehouse near Laurel, Delaware. Overall, this outbreak produced 71 tornadoes that killed three people.

=== April 17–19 (United States) ===
EFU	EF0	EF1	EF2	EF3	EF4	EF5
3	29	51	11	1	0	0

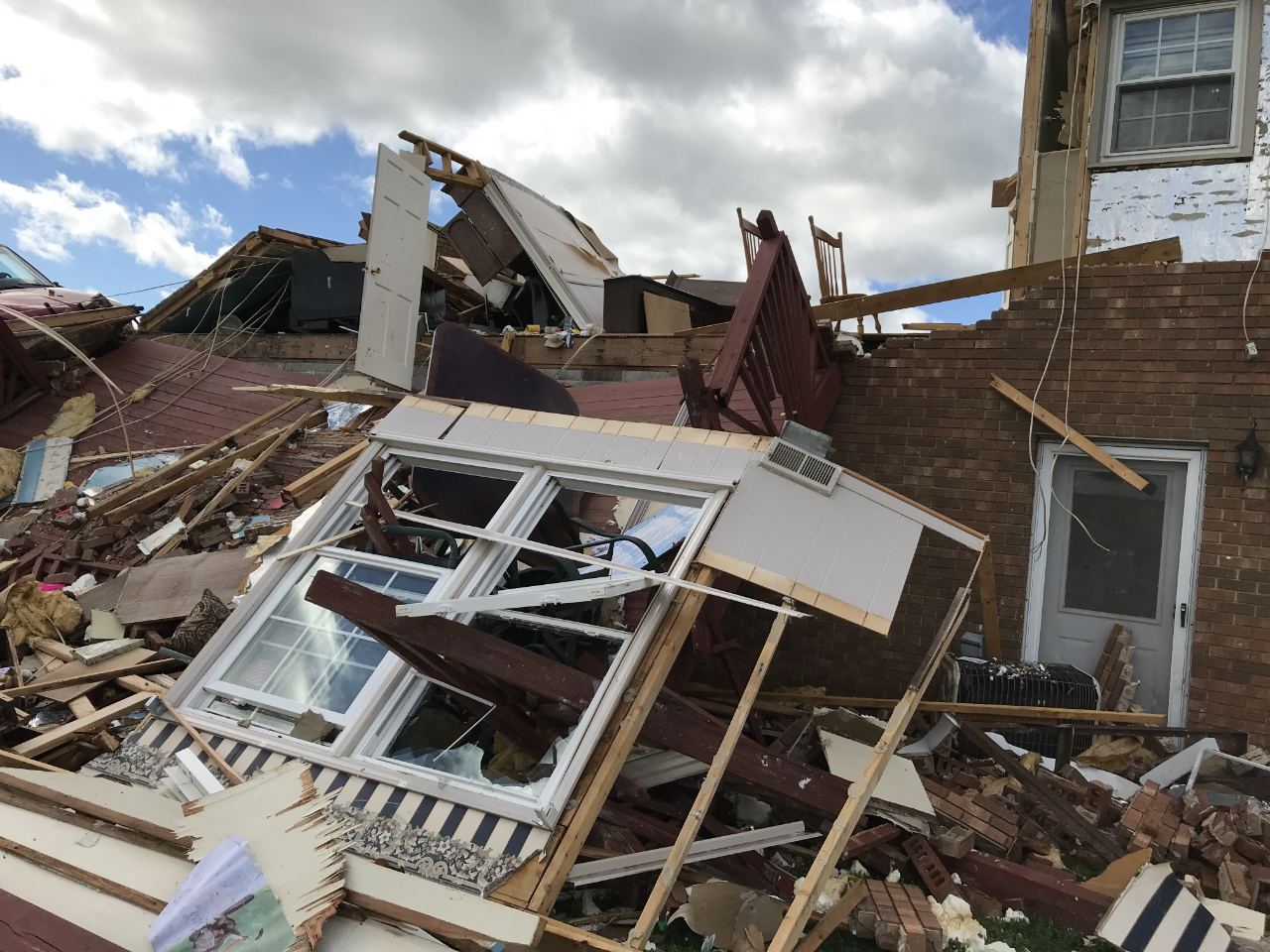
EF3 damage to a well-built brick home near Rocky Mount, Virginia.

Following the previous event, another outbreak of tornadoes impacted the Deep South and Eastern United States, accompanying a strong cold front across the southern Great Plains and into the Southeast. The Texas Panhandle, Kansas, and western Oklahoma were impacted on the afternoon of April 17, with eight weak tornadoes causing little to no damage. The next day, the Storm Prediction Center issued an enhanced risk for Mississippi and Alabama, including a 10% hatched risk area for tornadoes. A total of 43 tornadoes touched down in Mississippi that evening, a few of which were strong. One tornado that touched down in the small town of Morton severely damaged or destroyed several homes and was rated high-end EF2. Two EF1 tornadoes downed numerous trees in Philadelphia, Mississippi as well, one of which collapsed the exterior wall of an urgent care. Two EF2 tornadoes near Learned snapped numerous large trees and power poles as well. By April 19, the severe weather threat had shifted to the Eastern United States, with a moderate risk in place for the Carolinas and Virginia. This included a 10% risk area for tornadoes, and numerous tornadoes touched down from Florida to Pennsylvania throughout the day and evening, several of which were strong. In Virginia, an EF3 tornado passed near Rocky Mount destroying homes, tossing vehicles, and injuring two people. An EF2 tornado also ripped the roof off of a house near Mineral, while another EF2 tornado near Charles City severely damaged a rod and gun club. A few significant tornadoes occurred across parts of the Carolinas as well, including an EF2 tornado that significantly damaged a few homes in the southern part of Hillsborough, North Carolina. Further north, EF2 tornadoes caused considerable damage in the Pennsylvania communities of St. Thomas and Lewistown. The storm system also led to a Major League Baseball game being postponed between the Baltimore Orioles and Minneapolis Twins. A total of 95 tornadoes were confirmed as a result of this outbreak, none of which caused fatalities.

=== April 24–25 (United States) ===
EFU	EF0	EF1	EF2	EF3	EF4	EF5
1	2	9	4	1	0	0

Beginning on April 24, a small outbreak of strong tornadoes impacted Texas and Louisiana. A strong EF2 tornado impacted the outskirts of Bryan, Texas, where a house and several warehouses sustained major structural damage, and one person was injured. Another strong tornado caused high-end EF2 damage in the town of San Augustine, Texas, where multiple homes and businesses were damaged or destroyed. During the early morning hours of April 25, a large tornado of EF3 intensity caused major damage in Ruston, Louisiana, including portions of the Louisiana Tech University campus. Numerous homes and businesses were damaged or destroyed, vehicles were lofted, and two people were killed when a large tree crushed a house. Another early-morning wedge tornado tracked from Morehouse Parish, Louisiana into Ashley County, Arkansas, mowing down hundreds of trees at EF2 intensity. Near Jena, Louisiana, an EF2 tornado ripped half of the roof off of a house and downed many trees. A few additional weak tornadoes touched down across portions of the Ohio Valley, including two EF1 tornadoes touched down near North Vernon, Indiana, causing damage to trees, vehicles, and homes. 17 tornadoes were confirmed as a result of this outbreak, which killed two people.

=== April 30 (Europe) ===
FU	F0	F1	F2	F3	F4	F5
1	1	0	1	0	0	0

A large F2 stovepipe tornado touched down in Romania near Drajna Nouă, a village in Călărași County. 10 buildings sustained damage from the tornado. A passenger bus was overturned and blown into a field by the force of the winds, injuring 12 people. An F0 tornado that touched down in field near Movila Banului, Romania occurred as well, and a weak, brief tornado of unknown intensity was also confirmed near Banatska Dubica, Serbia.

=== April 30 (United States) ===
EFU	EF0	EF1	EF2	EF3	EF4	EF5
1	17	26	3	1	0	0

During the afternoon and evening of April 30, numerous tornadoes touched down across portions of Texas, Oklahoma, Kansas, Missouri, Illinois, and Arkansas, a few of which were strong. An EF3 wedge tornado killed two people, injured 9 others, and caused major damage as it passed near Blue, Oklahoma. A high-end EF2 tornado touched down in the northern part of Ozark, Missouri before passing near Rogersville, injuring three people and destroying or heavily damaging numerous homes. Significant damage to homes and businesses also occurred as a result of an EF2 tornado that struck Haileyville, Oklahoma, where one person was injured. Another EF2 tornado caused damage to homes, barns, power lines, and outbuildings near Talala. Numerous other weak tornadoes also touched down, including an EF1 tornado that struck Denton, Texas, downing trees at the Texas Woman's University campus and in nearby neighborhoods. Overall, this outbreak produced 48 tornadoes and killed two people. Sabine National Forest was shut down due to tornado damage.

== May ==
=== May 17–18 (United States) ===
EFU	EF0	EF1	EF2	EF3	EF4	EF5
6	15	13	8	5	0	0

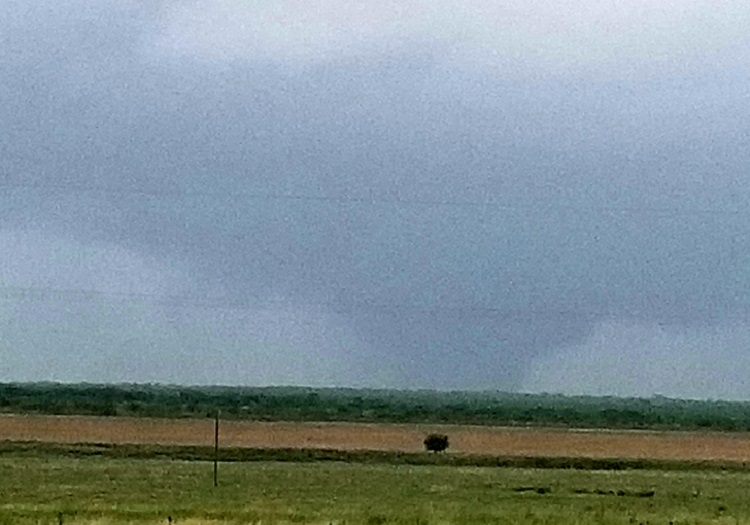
A large EF3 tornado that struck the town of Ballinger, Texas on May 18, 2019.

In mid- to late May, the mid-level pattern across the United States was characterized by an expansive area of high pressure across the Southeast and an abnormally strong trough across the West. With warm, moist air propagating northward from the Gulf of Mexico, and several mid-level impulses intersecting this unstable airmass, conditions became ideal for sustained and significant severe weather beginning on May 17. The threat for organized severe weather on May 17 was first outlined five days prior, when the Storm Prediction Center (SPC) outlined the Texas and Oklahoma panhandles, as well as western Kansas, in a 15% probability contour. On the morning of May 14, this risk area was expanded and 30% severe probabilities were introduced as the SPC gained confidence in a widespread and prolonged severe weather outbreak. For the first time in the organization's history, a threat of severe weather was introduced for their entire day 4–8 period. On May 17, multiple strong tornadoes touched down across parts of Nebraska and Kansas, though they remained in mostly rural areas. Numerous EF2 and EF3 tornadoes impacted Texas on May 18, including two EF2 tornadoes that caused significant damage in the cities of Abilene and San Angelo, and an EF3 tornado which caused major damage in Ballinger as well. 46 tornadoes were confirmed during this outbreak with four injuries occurring.

=== May 20–23 (United States) ===
EFU	EF0	EF1	EF2	EF3	EF4	EF5
27	30	45	7	5	0	0

The Storm Prediction Center issued a high risk of severe weather on May 20 for the regions of northern Texas and much of Oklahoma, in what was anticipated to be a major outbreak of violent and long-tracked tornadoes. As a precaution, many public school districts, private schools and colleges (including the University of Oklahoma) throughout Oklahoma announced during the afternoon and evening of May 19 that they would cancel all classes and extracurricular activities for the following day, if not hold classes during the morning only. Ironically, in response to the deaths of seven students at Plaza Towers Elementary School in Moore after an EF5 tornado hit that school and nearby Briarwood Elementary six years earlier on May 20, 2013, several of the public primary and secondary schools that canceled classes had since installed underground storm shelters for student and faculty use in the event that a tornado approached during school time. The El Reno, Oklahoma school district—which has storm shelters at seven of its schools (six underground and one above-ground shelter)—was one of the few in sections of central and western Oklahoma under highest threat of significant severe weather that decided to hold regular classes that day; El Reno Superintendent Craig McVay defended the decision on safety grounds, acknowledging that between 75% and 90% of students in the district do not have shelters in their home. Businesses, churches and other venues also decided to cancel events and activities, while some city-government offices (including in Oklahoma City) and Tinker Air Force Base instituted liberal leave policies to allow employees to arrive home prior to the onset of severe thunderstorm activity. However, only moderately strong tornadoes occurred that evening as a result of less favorable conditions, though an EF3 did still occur near Odessa, Texas. In the early morning hours of May 22, an EF2 tornado severely damaged a house near Adair, Iowa, killing one person and injuring another. Later that evening, an EF3 tornado caused severe damage in Carl Junction, Missouri, while another EF3 tornado destroyed homes near Golden City, killing three people and injuring one. Just before midnight, an EF3 tornado damaged or destroyed many homes and businesses in Jefferson City, killing one person and injuring 32 others. 114 tornadoes were confirmed during this outbreak, with four deaths occurring as a result.

=== May 25–30 (United States) ===
EFU	EF0	EF1	EF2	EF3	EF4	EF5
19	95	44	15	7	2	0

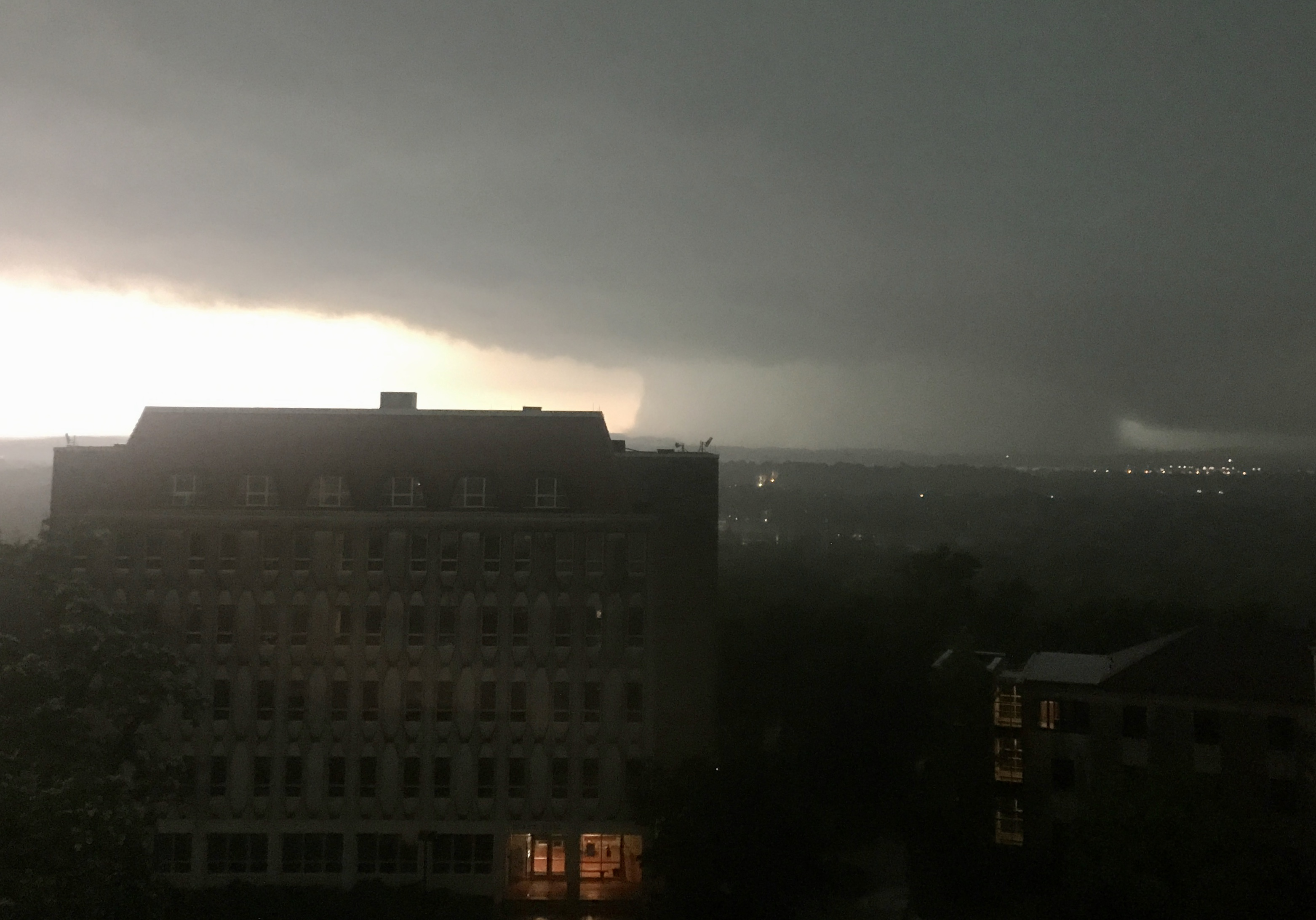
A view from the University of Kansas showing the rainwrapped EF4 tornado south of Lawrence on May 28.

A much larger outbreak occurred days after the previous one. As persistent southwesterly mid-level flow continued to engulf the Central Plains, the SPC on May 25 once again warned of the potential for widespread severe weather, outlining the Texas Panhandle, western Oklahoma, and southern Kansas in an enhanced risk. This included a 10% risk of tornadoes. An area of low pressure was expected to progress over the southern High Plains, supporting a southward-extending dryline and a northeast-extending cold front to the Iowa–Missouri border. Within the warm sector, mid-level CAPE values were forecast to rise upwards of 2,000–3000 J/kg, with dewpoints in the mid-60s °F as far west as eastern New Mexico. On the night of May 25, an EF3 tornado ripped through a mobile home park and a hotel in the southern part of El Reno, Oklahoma, killing two and injuring 29 others. A large outbreak of strong to violent tornadoes impacted the Ohio Valley region on the evening of May 27, including an EF3 tornado that caused severe damage in Celina, Ohio, killing one person there and injuring eight others. Dayton, Ohio and its surrounding suburbs were hit by EF4, EF3, and EF2 tornadoes in quick succession, resulting in widespread major damage throughout the metro area, and at least 166 injuries. On May 28, a violent, rain-wrapped EF4 wedge tornado impacted the outskirts of Lawrence and Linwood, Kansas, destroying many homes and injuring 18 people. 182 tornadoes occurred as a result of the outbreak, with three deaths occurring and at least 239 injuries.

=== May 30–31 (Chile) ===
FU	F0	F1	F2	F3	F4	F5
0	0	0	2	0	0	0

An F2 tornado hit Los Ángeles, Chile on May 30, causing significant damage and injuring 16 people. Homes and businesses were severely damaged, billboards and light poles were destroyed, vehicles were flipped, and power lines were downed by the tornado. The next day, another damaging F2 tornado moved through Talcahuano and Concepción, killing one person and injuring at least 23 people. Many homes and some businesses had partial to total roof loss as a result of the tornado, and a few sustained some collapse of exterior walls. Vehicles were overturned, and debris was strewn through streets and left tangled in power lines. Numerous trees and utility poles were downed as well.

== June ==
=== June 3–5 (Europe) ===
FU	F0	F1	F2	F3	F4	F5
1	3	4	5	0	0	0

In early June, a three-day tornado outbreak affected several countries in Europe. The first tornado touched down in Germany on June 3 and caused F0 damage to tree limbs near the small village of Meuchefitz. In France, another F0 tornado caused minor tree and power line damage near Courpalay. On the evening of June 4, the town of Rheden, Netherlands and several other small villages located nearby were hit by an F2 tornado. Homes and buildings had roofing torn off, greenhouses were damaged, and numerous large trees were snapped or uprooted, some of which landed on structures and cars. In Germany, another F2 tornado touched down in Bocholt, where homes and businesses had large portions of their roofs ripped off, and many trees were snapped. A caravan was thrown across a road and destroyed, a car was flipped in town, and brick garden walls were toppled over. Additional tornadoes touched down in the Netherlands later that night, including an F1 tornado that impacted Emmeloord, where 30 homes had broken windows and roof tiles stripped off. Cars in town were damaged by flying debris and falling trees, and a caravan was tossed into a garden. Another F1 tornado caused roof, tree, and vehicle damage in Ommen, while an unrated tornado also caused tree and roof damage in the Haaksbergen area. Five tornadoes touched down in remote northwestern Russia on June 5. Each of the tornadoes occurred in very sparsely populated areas of dense forest, and produced paths of significant tree damage. One F2 tornado was on the ground for 19.7 km and reached a peak wide of 550m as it passed near Ust'-Ocheya, while another F2 tornado grew to 600m wide along a 18.5 km track near Slobodskoy. A third F2 tornado briefly touched down in a forest near Chitayevo, snapping or uprooting many trees along a 2.3 km long and 200m wide path. Two F1 tornadoes were also confirmed in other rural areas. Farther west in France, an F0 tornado caused minor tree, fence, and roof damage in Migré. A total of 13 tornadoes were confirmed, none of which resulted in any serious injuries or fatalities.

=== June 6 (United States) ===
EFU	EF0	EF1	EF2	EF3	EF4	EF5
0	4	13	1	0	0	0

A small outbreak of mostly weak tornadoes impacted Louisiana on June 6, causing minor to moderate damage. The most significant tornado was an EF2 tornado that threw a tied-down office trailer near Sorrento, injuring five people. An EF1 tornado also hit Baton Rouge, damaging a hospital, a warehouse, multiple vehicles, and many trees. A total of 18 tornadoes were confirmed.

=== June 8–9 (United States) ===
EFU	EF0	EF1	EF2	EF3	EF4	EF5
10	3	0	2	0	0	0

On June 8, an EF2 tornado touched down near Fertile, Minnesota, snapping or uprooting numerous large trees, throwing farming equipment and grain bins, and damaging or destroying barns and outbuildings. On June 9, another EF2 tornado struck the Big Divide/Grimes Crossing Rd. neighborhood of Copperas Cove, Texas, downing trees and damaging 196 homes in just 4 minutes before dissipating. Two of these homes sustained significant structural damage. Multiple other weak tornadoes occurred across parts of the Midwestern and Central United States. A destructive squall line also pushed through the Oklahoma City metropolitan area, causing both wind and hail damage. A total of 15 tornadoes were confirmed.

=== June 14 (Denmark) ===
FU	F0	F1	F2	F3	F4	F5
0	0	1	1	0	0	0

On June 14, two tornadoes touched down in Denmark. The first tornado was rated F1 and touched down in Kruså, downing several trees and collapsing a garage. 10 minutes later, a low-end F2/T4 tornado hit a hospital complex in Åbenrå, flipping and damaging several vehicles in a parking lot.

=== June 15–16 (United States) ===
EFU	EF0	EF1	EF2	EF3	EF4	EF5
3	17	16	6	0	0	0

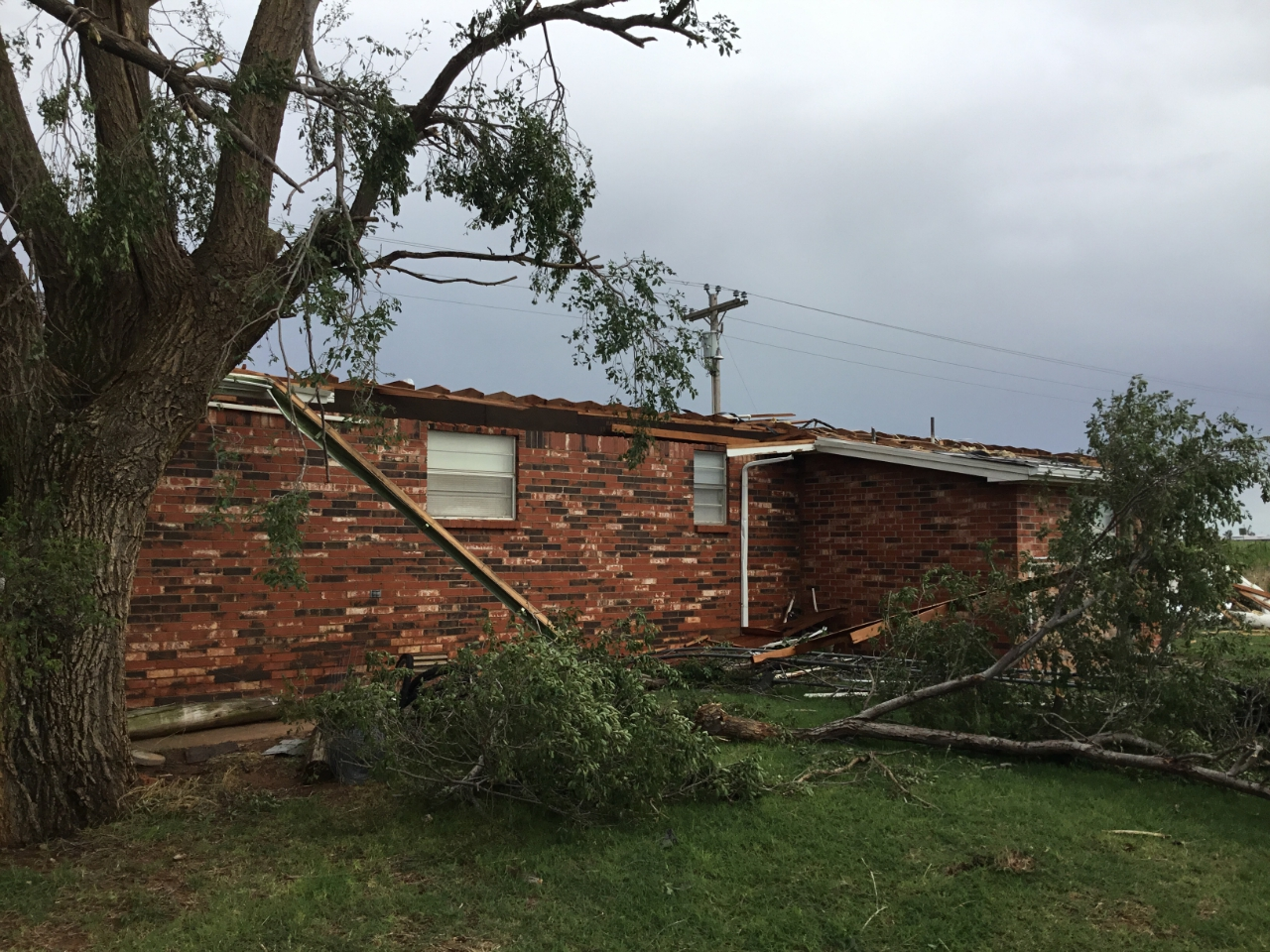
EF2 damage to a house near Custer City, Oklahoma.

On June 15, a moderate tornado outbreak impacted parts of the Great Plains and Midwest. An EF2 tornado caused major tree and outbuilding damage near Elletsville, Indiana, while another EF2 tornado caused significant tree and structural damage near Koleen. A third EF2 tornado near Rushville destroyed a garage, heavily damaged a house, and destroyed silos and outbuildings. An EF1 tornado also moved through Beech Grove, causing roof damage to multiple structures, and another EF1 tornado caused damage in Freedom. Two EF2 tornadoes caused severe damage to homes, snapped trees and power poles, destroyed outbuildings, and tossed vehicles and farming equipment near Oakville, Iowa. In Oklahoma, an EF2 tornado ripped the roof off a house and snapped multiple power poles near Custer City. Another damaging squall line also pushed through the Oklahoma City metropolitan area. Multiple other weak tornadoes occurred across the Great Plains the following day, including an EF1 tornado that damaged homes and trees in Arlington, Texas. An EF1 tornado also struck the town of Parker, Pennsylvania, causing moderate damage to structures and trees. Overall, this outbreak produced a total of 42 tornadoes.

== July ==
=== July 3 (China) ===
A violent stovepipe tornado moved through the city of Kaiyuan in Liaoning Province, Northeastern China, killing seven people and injuring 190. Numerous homes sustained major structural damage, with roofs removed and exterior walls collapsed. Several multi-story apartment buildings were significantly damaged, and multiple industrial buildings and factories were also significantly damaged or completely destroyed, with metal support beams severely mangled. The most intense damage was noted at a large reinforced concrete cafeteria building, which was almost entirely leveled. Trees were snapped, twisted, and debarked and power poles were snapped as well. Vehicles were also thrown and destroyed, and farm fields in rural areas outside of the city were heavily scoured. The tornado was rated EF4 in intensity.

=== July 10 (Russia) ===
An isolated IF2 tornado moved through southern areas of Kushva, a scar is visible on satellite imagery where this tornado struck. Roofs were destroyed and thrown, power poles were downed and trees were uprooted and snapped. Kushva would be hit yet again by an IF3 tornado just under 7 years later, on June 22 2026.

=== July 28 (Europe) ===
FU	F0	F1	F2	F3	F4	F5
1	5	0	1	0	0	0

At around 2:00 a.m. on July 28, an F2 tornado hit Fiumicino in Central Italy, passing near the Leonardo da Vinci–Fiumicino Airport. The tornado tossed and flipped multiple cars, killing a woman inside one of them. The tornado also damaged several homes and a gas station, bent signs to the ground, and downed trees and brick fences as well. The tornado was a part of a small outbreak of otherwise weak tornadoes that impacted several countries in Europe that day. An F0 tornado caused roof and chimney damage in the Klagstorp, Sweden area, while another weak tornado caused damage to trees and vehicles in Jönköping County, Sweden. A total of 7 tornadoes were confirmed.

== August ==
=== August 9 (Europe) ===
FU	F0	F1	F2	F3	F4	F5
4	0	2	1	0	0	0

A small outbreak of seven tornadoes impacted Europe on August 9, including an F1 rope tornado that touched town in downtown Amsterdam, Netherlands. This tornado was caught on video by many tourists and locals as it caused roof damage to structures and damaged trees. A tourist boat was also struck and damaged by the tornado as well. Another F1 tornado near Hem, Netherlands snapped trees, overturned two trailers, and damaged greenhouses. The most significant event of the outbreak was a strong tornado that touched down in northeastern France, causing damage to roofs and vehicles in the Longwy and Herserange areas. The tornado crossed into Luxembourg and grew into a multiple-vortex, high-end F2 tornado that tore directly through Rodange, Lamadelaine, and Pétange, injuring 19 people, two critically. Numerous homes, apartment buildings, and multi-story brick buildings had their roofs torn off, and a few sustained some failure their upper floor exterior walls. Streets were littered with debris, and numerous vehicles were crushed and damaged by falling bricks and flying debris. Many trees were snapped or uprooted, and large metal truss transmission towers were toppled to the ground. Billboards and signs were blown over as well. In western Russia, a tornado of unknown intensity caused considerable damage to homes in the small village of Malyy Karamas, while another tornado caused minor tree and roof damage in the village of Kurgem. Two other weak tornadoes were confirmed near Kuressaare, Estonia and Beausite, France, causing little to no damage.

=== August 11–12 (New Zealand) ===
Severe thunderstorms hit New Zealand's North Island with hail and tornadoes over two consecutive days. On August 11, severe thunderstorms hit Auckland, with a tornado hitting the suburb of Saint Heliers and lifting roofs. More severe thunderstorms developed on the following day. Two tornadoes were reported from the Taranaki region, causing damage to houses and injuring one person. A tornadic waterspout touched down at the Auckland waterfront, damaging boats and businesses, and causing a container to fall on a car, injuring a person inside. Large hail, lightning and torrential rain accompanied the tornadoes.

=== August 20 (Iowa) ===
EFU	EF0	EF1	EF2	EF3	EF4	EF5
0	0	2	0	1	0	0

Three tornadoes embedded in a line of severe thunderstorms caused damage in Iowa on August 20. Near Van Meter, Iowa, a brief EF1 tornado caused damage to trees and a residence. Another EF1 tornado near Harvey, Iowa caused minor damage to crops, trees, and buildings. The most significant tornado of the event was a strong EF3 tornado near Lacona, Iowa that tore through the Iowa Operator Engineers Training Facility, where multiple large metal warehouse buildings were completely destroyed, with debris scattered throughout the area. Metal footings were ripped out of concrete at a few of these structures. Elsewhere along the path, trees, grain bins, and a few farmsteads sustained less severe damage.

=== August 29 (China) ===
On the night of August 29, a strong EF2 tornado struck Nada, Hainan in South China, causing eight fatalities and leaving eight people injured. Multiple factories and industrial buildings were severely damaged or destroyed, and homes sustained significant damage as well. The fatalities occurred when temporary housing for workers at a construction site was obliterated. Many trees and power poles were downed, some of which landed on structures and vehicles.

== September ==
=== September 5–6 (Hurricane Dorian) ===
EFU	EF0	EF1	EF2	EF3	EF4	EF5
0	18	5	2	0	0	0

On September 5, the approach and landfall of Hurricane Dorian triggered an enhanced risk from the SPC with a rare 15% non-hatched area for tornadoes. A small, but destructive tornado outbreak then occurred across the Carolinas, as embedded supercells within the outer bands of the hurricane came ashore. An EF1 tornado struck Little River, South Carolina, damaging docks, trees, and homes. In North Myrtle Beach, an EF0 tornado damaged mobile homes and condominiums. A majority of the tornadoes occurred in North Carolina, including a damaging EF2 tornado that destroyed numerous RVs and mobile homes in Emerald Isle, as well as causing severe roof damage to some frame homes. Another EF2 tornado struck Carolina Shores, tearing large sections of roof off multiple homes, snapping many trees, and injuring one person. Two separate EF0 tornadoes struck Wilmington, resulting in minor damage to trees and homes in the city. Another EF0 tornado moved through downtown New Bern, causing minor tree and awning damage. A total of 25 tornadoes were confirmed as a result of this outbreak.

=== September 10–11 (United States) ===
EFU	EF0	EF1	EF2	EF3	EF4	EF5
2	3	1	6	0	0	0

On September 10, multiple tornadoes occurred across parts of the Northern Great Plains, several of which were strong. A multiple-vortex, EF2 wedge tornado passed through rural areas near Fort Laramie, Wyoming, causing significant damage to homes and other structures. Just before midnight, three separate brief, but strong high-end EF2 tornadoes impacted the city of Sioux Falls, South Dakota, causing severe damage. The first tornado struck residential areas in the south side of town, where several homes had roofs and exterior walls ripped off. The second tornado struck the Avera Behavioral Health Center and Avera Heart Hospital in southeastern Sioux Falls, where numerous windows were blown out, and eight people were injured by flying glass and debris, while one had a fractured skull as they were thrown into the exterior wall of the building. The hospital also sustained considerable roof and facade damage, and cars were tossed in the parking lot. The third tornado touched down closer to the downtown area of the city, flipping cars, severely damaging businesses, and tearing the roof off a multi-story apartment building. Numerous trees were snapped or uprooted by the three tornadoes as well. Winds were estimated to have reached as high as 130 MPH in the Avera Heart Hospital tornado. Several other weak tornadoes also touched down across the region that day as well. On September 11, two EF2 tornadoes occurred near Fleming, Colorado, with one snapping power poles and the other destroying a pole barn. A brief EF0 tornado also touched down in Grand Rapids, Michigan, blowing the roof off an apartment building. A total of 12 tornadoes were confirmed.

=== September 24 (United States) ===
EFU	EF0	EF1	EF2	EF3	EF4	EF5
4	2	1	0	1	0	0

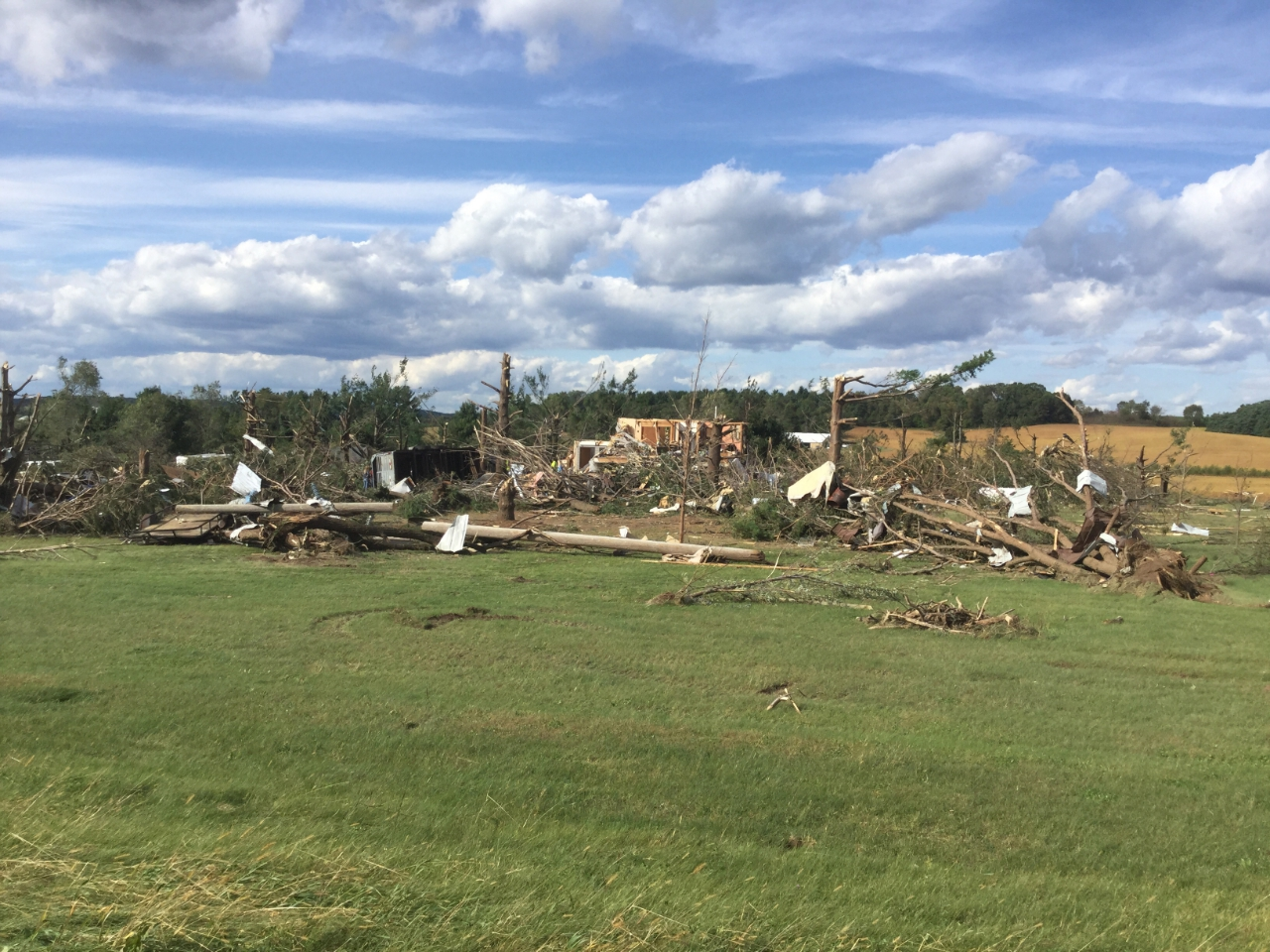
Denuded trees and EF3 damage to a home near Elk Mound, Wisconsin.

On the night of September 24, a large tornado touched down in the village of Elk Mound, Wisconsin, where trees were downed and a few homes sustained moderate damage. The tornado continued to the northeast and intensified as it passed through rural areas outside of town, reaching EF3 intensity and destroying several homes and mobile homes in the area. Vehicles were tossed and damaged, while barns, outbuildings, and self-storage units were destroyed, and numerous trees were snapped, denuded, and partially debarked as well. Three people were injured by the tornado. An EF1 tornado passed near Greenwood, Wisconsin, damaging trees, silos, and barns, and killing three cows. Further east, an EF0 tornado caused minor damage in Lake City, Minnesota. A few other weak tornadoes touched down in Kansas, Texas, and Iowa as well. A total of eight tornadoes were confirmed.

=== September 27 (Singapore) ===
A brief, late-morning landspout tornado touched down in Tuas, damaging the roofs of several warehouses in the area and blowing out windows. No injuries were reported. This was the first confirmed tornado in Singapore since 1950.

== October ==
=== October 1 (India) ===
A likely tornado touched down in Talod, Sabarkantha District, Gujarat and caused light damage to cotton and peanut plants. There is only a few videoes of the Tornado and several news channels said it was 'Tornado-like cloud' even though the 'Tornado-like cloud' was rotating and had some debris flying around it.

=== October 12 (Japan) ===
On October 12, Typhoon Hagibis produced a strong EF2 wedge tornado that ripped through Chiba Prefecture, causing severe damage in Ichihara, south-east of Tokyo. Several homes sustained major structural damage, some of which sustained roof loss and exterior wall damage. Multiple cars were thrown and damaged, and one man was killed when his vehicle was flipped by the tornado. Debris was strewn across roads and wrapped around power lines, and trees and power poles were snapped. At least five other people were injured. The tornado was clearly visible on radar, with a hook echo and debris ball present.

=== October 18–20 (Tropical Storm Nestor) ===
EFU	EF0	EF1	EF2	EF3	EF4	EF5
0	4	1	1	0	0	0

Multiple tornadoes touched down in Florida, Georgia, and South Carolina in association with Tropical Storm Nestor. The strongest tornado was a large, destructive EF2 tornado that struck Kathleen, Florida to the west of Lakeland. It destroyed one home while causing significant damage to other homes, significantly damaged the roof of Kathleen Middle School, downed fences and trees, tossed a camper into a residence, and overturned a tractor trailer. An EF1 tornado also damaged 18 homes and damaged or destroyed several vehicles in the northwestern part of Cape Coral, Florida.

=== October 20 (Indonesia and Malaysia) ===
On October 20, a tornado moved through three different villages in Batu, East Java in Indonesia, causing one fatality, heavily damaging or destroying about 20 houses, and causing minor to moderate damage to many other homes. The tornado also snapped trees and damaged parts of the electricity network within the affected villages. Another tornado was reported near Kedah in Malaysia, destroying two dozen homes.

=== October 20–22 (United States) ===
EFU	EF0	EF1	EF2	EF3	EF4	EF5
0	13	20	2	1	0	0

On the night October 20, an intense, destructive EF3 tornado moved through densely populated areas of Dallas and Richardson, Texas. Numerous homes, businesses, schools, churches, and other buildings were severely damaged or destroyed by the tornado. Numerous trees and power lines were downed throughout the path as well. A high-end EF2 tornado also struck the suburb of Garland, Texas and heavily damaged multiple warehouse buildings and homes. Several other tornadoes impacted areas in and around the Dallas–Fort Worth metroplex that night, including a high-end EF1 tornado that moved through residential areas in Rowlett and Wylie, causing considerable roof damage to numerous homes. The next day, a very large 1.5-mile (2.4 km)-wide EF2 tornado hit Siloam Springs, Arkansas, damaging many homes and businesses. The tornado continued to the northeast and caused additional damage in Rogers, Arkansas. Later, an EF1 tornado struck areas of south Memphis, Tennessee, damaging an apartment complex, businesses, trees, and vehicles. Two weak EF0 tornadoes touched down on October 22, causing minor damage before the outbreak came to an end. A total of 36 tornadoes were confirmed as a result of this outbreak.

=== October 31 – November 1 (United States) ===
EFU	EF0	EF1	EF2	EF3	EF4	EF5
0	4	5	1	0	0	0

On Halloween evening, a fast-moving and powerful cold front swept through the Eastern United States. Several tornadoes touched down, the most significant of which was an EF2 tornado that stuck the Philadelphia suburb of Glen Mills, Pennsylvania. The tornado heavily damaged three homes in town and caused lesser damage to several others. Numerous trees were snapped or uprooted by the tornado, and two people were injured. Several other EF0 and EF1 tornadoes occurred in Tennessee, Virginia, and South Carolina. In Gilbert, South Carolina, a tornado touched down and moved bleachers at Pleasant Hill Middle School before dissipating. that evening as well. The storm system produced a few additional tornadoes across the region on November 1 as well, including an EF1 tornado that moved through Madison, New Jersey, downing numerous trees. Some of the trees landed on homes, vehicles, and power lines. Another EF1 tornado impacted the south edge of Chesapeake, Virginia as well, destroying an RV camper and inflicting roof, shingle, and gutter damage to several homes. A total of 10 tornadoes were confirmed. The severe weather outbreak knocked out power to 750,000 customers. The tornado outbreak resulted in several SEPTA lines being suspended on November 1.

== November ==
=== November 12 (South Africa) ===
The South African Weather Service confirmed a tornado of unclassified strength tornado near New Hanover, KwaZulu-Natal. The strong tornado snapped and uprooted numerous trees, and damaged or destroyed multiple homes. Two people were killed and several more were injured.

=== November 18 (New Zealand) ===
A tornado tore through the city of Christchurch on November 18, tearing off roofs, shattering windows, and injuring two people. No deaths were reported. The tornado was accompanied by a severe thunderstorm which brought hail, lightning and thunder as well as a waterspout that was spotted out at sea at New Brighton.

=== November 26–27 (United States) ===
EFU	EF0	EF1	EF2	EF3	EF4	EF5
1	3	2	2	0	0	0

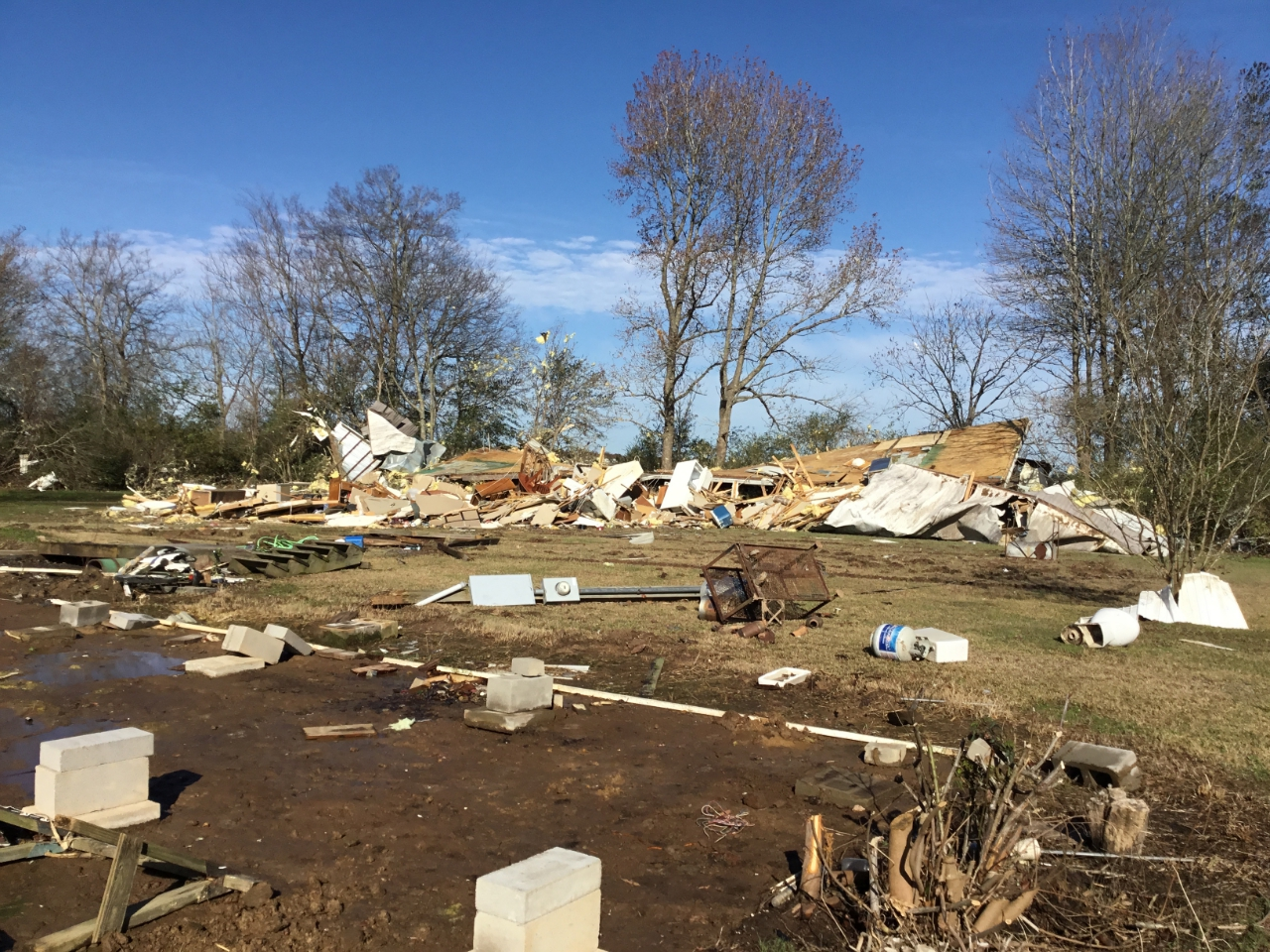
EF2 damage to a mobile home near Baskin, Louisiana.

A cold front brought rain showers, gusty winds, and severe weather to the Southern United States on the night of November 26. A few tornadoes, two of them strong, touched down in Louisiana and Mississippi. An EF2 tornado near Baskin, Louisiana destroyed two mobile homes, downed trees and power poles, and slid a church partway off its foundation. Two people, one of whom later died, were injured in one of the mobile homes. Another EF2 tornado damaged homes and destroyed outbuildings in Star, Mississippi. Two EF1 tornadoes in Louisiana and Mississippi also caused damage that was mostly limited to trees. On the morning of November 27, a low-topped supercell spawned three brief EF0 tornadoes in Pike and Barbour Counties in Alabama, resulting in minor damage. An EF1 tornado downed large trees and tree limbs near Puckett, Mississippi as well. A total of eight tornadoes were confirmed, along with one fatality.

== December ==
=== December 5 (Indonesia) ===
On December 5, thunderstorms were reported over Indonesia. One storm over Rote Island produced a waterspout which moved onshore, becoming a tornado and causing significant damage. Many homes were damaged by the tornado, and at least one person was injured.

=== December 10–11 (Indonesia) ===
On December 10, a tornado struck Bangkalan, causing significant damage but no fatalities. Multiple buildings sustained varying degrees of damage, including a warehouse and a workshop. Many trees and power poles were downed, including an electrical pole that fell onto a car. A second rain-wrapped tornado also touched down in another part of Bangkalan, downing trees and destroyed a billboard, a straight line wind event occurred in Kediri, downing many trees, one of which landed on four cars, killing one. On December 11, a severe thunderstorm produced a tornado in Magetan, unroofing several houses and shop, causing severe tree damage, and injuring two people.

=== December 16–17 (United States) ===
EFU	EF0	EF1	EF2	EF3	EF4	EF5
0	13	13	9	5	0	0

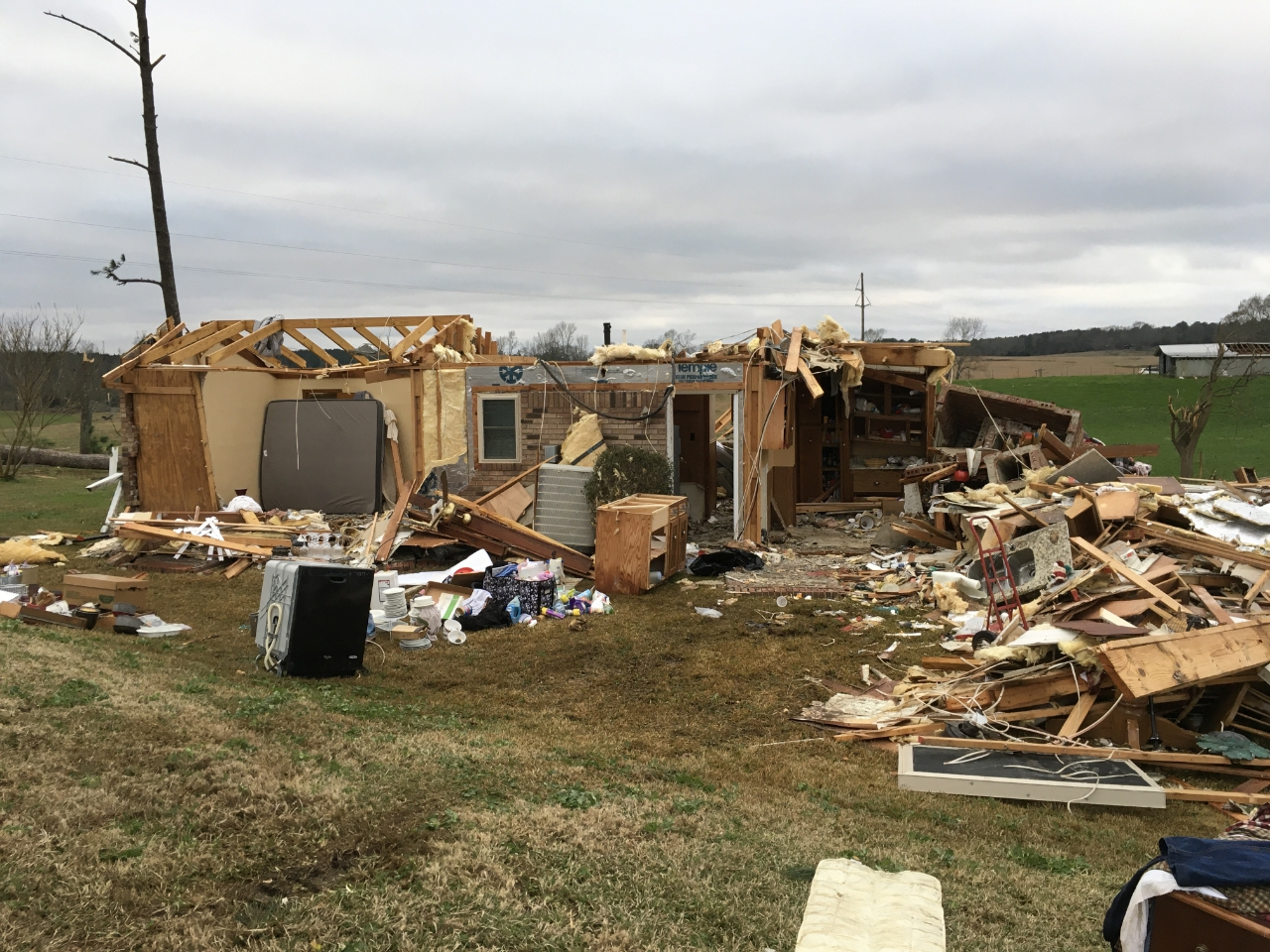
EF3 damage to a house near Mize, Mississippi.

A significant tornado outbreak unfolded across the Southern United States, particularly in Louisiana, Mississippi, and Alabama during the afternoon and evening of December 16. The Storm Prediction Center had issued a moderate risk with a 15% chance of significant tornadoes for the region after an upgrade from enhanced risk. The event was well forecasted, with outlooks being issued as far out as day 5. Many PDS tornado warnings and a rare tornado emergency in Alexandria, Louisiana were issued. An EF3 tornado struck Alexandria and areas outside of town, causing major damage and one fatality. Two more fatalities occurred in Lawrence County, Alabama as a result of an EF2 tornado that struck near Town Creek. EF3 tornadoes also caused severe damage in and around the towns of Sumrall and Laurel, Mississippi. Significant damage from EF2 tornadoes also occurred in Guntown and Columbia, Mississippi as well. Numerous other tornadoes, several of which were strong, impacted rural areas as well. On December 17, a few additional tornadoes touched down in Georgia, including a high-end EF2 that caused major damage to structures in the small community of Mystic. Overall, this outbreak resulted in three fatalities, all in Louisiana and Alabama and produced a total of 40 tornadoes.

== See also ==
- Weather of 2019
- Tornado
  - Tornadoes by year
  - Tornado records
  - Tornado climatology
  - Tornado myths
- List of tornado outbreaks
  - List of F5 and EF5 tornadoes
  - List of F4 and EF4 tornadoes
  - List of North American tornadoes and tornado outbreaks
  - List of 21st-century Canadian tornadoes and tornado outbreaks
  - List of European tornadoes and tornado outbreaks
  - List of tornadoes and tornado outbreaks in Asia
  - List of Southern Hemisphere tornadoes and tornado outbreaks
  - List of tornadoes striking downtown areas
  - List of tornadoes with confirmed satellite tornadoes
- Tornado intensity
  - Fujita scale
  - Enhanced Fujita scale
  - International Fujita scale
  - TORRO scale
