= Weeping Mary, Texas =

- Unincorporated community
- Location within the state of Texas Weeping Mary (the United States)
- Coordinates: 31°35′49″N 95°09′35″W
- Country: United States
- State: Texas
- County: Cherokee

Government
  - Type: Unincorporated Town
- Elevation: 226 ft (69 m)

Population (2000)
  - Total: 40
- Time zone: UTC-6 (Central (CST))
  - Summer (DST): UTC-6 (CDT)
- Area codes: 903, 430
- GNIS feature ID: 1370986

Weeping Mary is an unincorporated community in Cherokee County, Texas, United States. It is significant as the community closest to the ancient Caddo Mounds State Historic Site.

== History ==
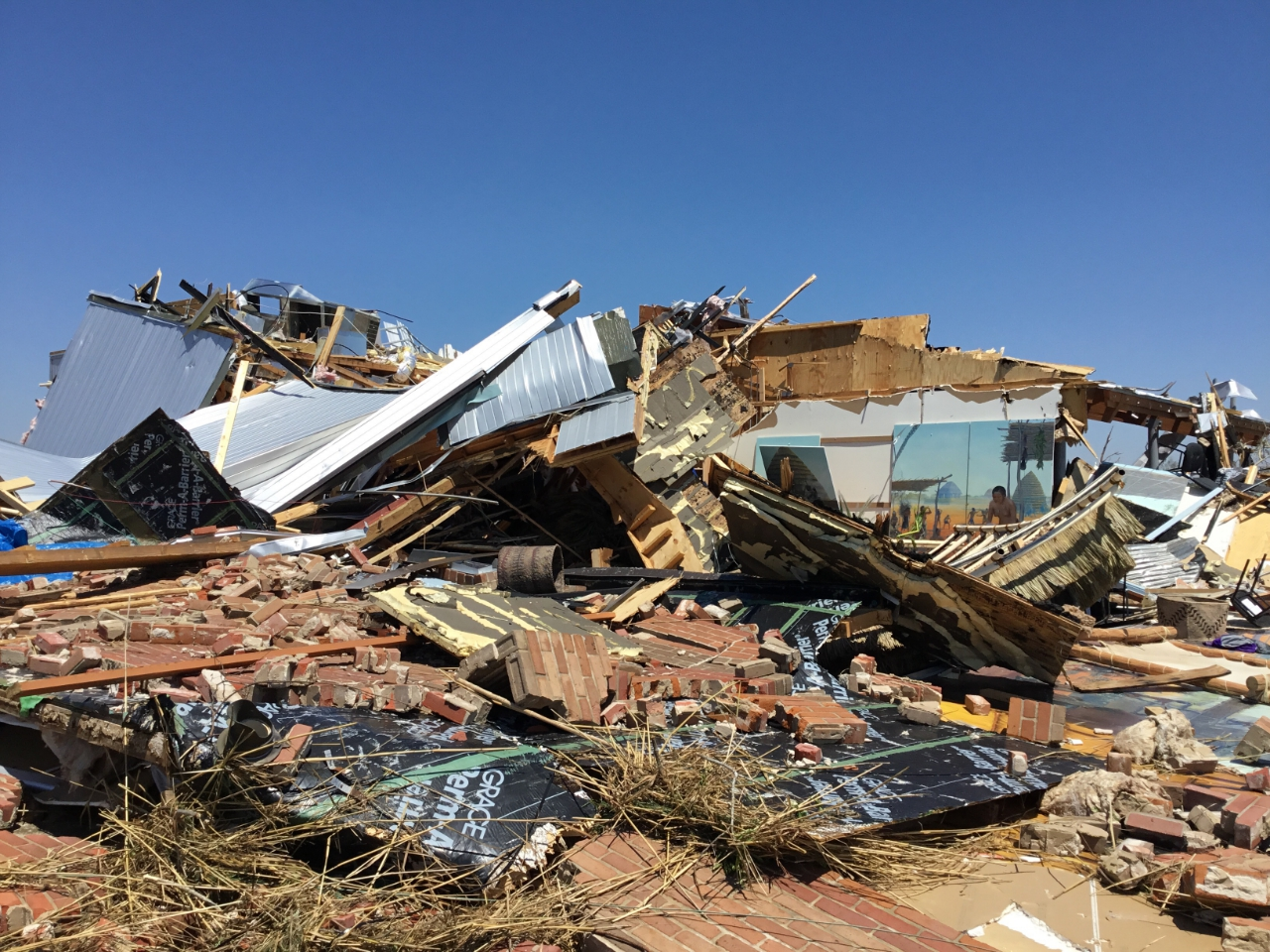
EF3 damage to the Caddo Mounds State Historic Site museum in Weeping Mary. One person was killed here, and several others were injured.

Weeping Mary was founded by recently freed slaves shortly after the Civil War. The community later founded a Baptist church. The community had a few scattered houses in the 1930s and gained a church in 1990. Demographic changes took place after a boll weevil infestation destroyed the cotton crops, and mechanization reduced the need for farm labor. Many people left in the Great Migration, seeking jobs on the West Coast, especially during and after World War II, when more defense industry jobs were available. The population was 40 in 2000.

On April 13, 2019, an EF-3 tornado struck the community, destroying several homes and the Caddo Mounds museum, killing two people and injuring 20 others.

=== Urban legends about the etymology ===
There are two known legends about how Weeping Mary got its name; the first claims that the name refers to Mary Magdalene crying at Jesus' tomb. In another version, the town was named for a former slave who cried after losing her land, as the government had promised it would not be taken away.

== Geography ==
Weeping Mary is located at the intersection of Texas State Highway 21 and Farm to Market Road 2907, 18 mi (29 km) west of Rusk and 6.5 mi (10.5 km) southwest of Alto in southern Cherokee County.

== Education ==
The community founded a local school for their children in 1896 and had a record of 40 pupils. It was still operational in the 1930s. Students living in Weeping Mary are within the Alto Independent School District.
