= Alto High School =

Location
- 248 CR 2429; Alto, Texas 75925-9599; United States; 31.6602°N 95.0735°W

Information
- School type: Public high school
- School district: Alto Independent School District
- Principal: Shanequa Redd-Dorsey
- Teaching staff: 16.95 (FTE)
- Grades: 9-12
- Enrollment: 147 (2023–2024)
- Student to teacher ratio: 8.67
- Colors: Black & Gold
- Athletics conference: UIL Class AA (2A)
- Mascot: Yellow Jacket/Lady Jacket
- Website: Alto High School

Alto High School (AHS) is a public high school in Alto, Texas. It is part of the Alto Independent School District which is located in south central Cherokee County and classified as a 2A school by the UIL. For the 2021-22 school year, the Texas Education Agency rated the school an 85 out of 100, giving it a B.

== Campus ==
Serving students in grades 9-12, Alto High School is a small community-based school.

In 2013, U.S. News & World Report awarded its bronze medal to the school based on its performance on state exit exams. As of 2015, the school had 194 students and 20 faculty members.

== Athletics ==
The Alto Yellow Jackets compete in the following sports:

- Baseball
- Basketball
- Cross Country
- Football
- Golf
- Softball
- Tennis
- Track and Field

=== Football ===
The football team has an all-time record of 482 wins, 290 losses and 31 ties as of the end of the 2013 season.

=== State Titles ===
- Football -
  - 2006(1A/D1), 2007(1A/D2)
- Softball -
  - 1999(2A)
- Boys Track -
  - 1984(2), 1986(2A), 1996(2A), 2004(2A), 2014(1A/D1)
- Girls Track -
  - 1996(2A), 2003(2A), 2005(2A)

==== State Finalist ====
- Baseball -
  - 1999(2A)
- Football -
  - 1995(2A)
- Softball -
  - 2000(2A), 2002(2A), 2009(1A)

=== Alto "Mean Sting Marching Machine" Band ===
The Alto ISD "Mean Sting Marching Machine" (#MSMM) Band is a composite band incorporating students from 7th through 12th grade. The director of Bands in Alto ISD is Mr. Timothy Ektefaei who began fall of 2014. Mr. Ektefaei is a graduate of Stephen F. Austin State University (M.M.ed) and Prairie View A&M University (BA). Under his leadership the band has grown from 25 members to over 100 participants for the 2017-2018 school year. This is recorded as the largest marching band in the history of the school. The band's notoriety and popularity have grown due to their success from competing with bands from across Texas, Louisiana, and Mississippi. The band has won numerous awards, having placed in every competition they have entered from 2014–present, including several Grand Champion Awards. The Alto Band has performed in front of an international television audience at the Circuit of The America's (COTA) Raceway in Austin, Texas as a part of the opening ceremony for the FIA World Endurance Championship race. The Mean Sting Band was recognized in the Spring semester of 2018 by Texas State Senator Robert Nichols for the band's outstanding performance in the 2018 San Antonio Battle of Flowers Parade, winning first place in the "Out of Town Bands" division. Senator Nichols presented the band with a flag that was flown over the Texas State Capitol building in their honor.

== Notable alumni ==
- Chris James, former MLB outfielder and third baseman
