= Chris James (baseball) =

American baseball player (born 1962)

- Outfielder
- Born: October 4, 1962 (age 63); Rusk, Texas, U.S.
- Batted: Right Threw: Right

MLB debut
- April 23, 1986, for the Philadelphia Phillies

Last MLB appearance
- October 1, 1995, for the Boston Red Sox

MLB statistics
- Batting average: .261
- Home runs: 90
- Runs batted in: 386
- Stats at Baseball Reference

Teams
- Philadelphia Phillies (1986–1989); San Diego Padres (1989); Cleveland Indians (1990–1991); San Francisco Giants (1992); Houston Astros (1993); Texas Rangers (1993–1994); Kansas City Royals (1995); Boston Red Sox (1995)

Donald Chris James (born October 4, 1962) is an American former professional baseball utility player who played in Major League Baseball (MLB) 10 years (1986–1995), for eight teams: the National League (NL) Philadelphia Phillies, San Diego Padres, San Francisco Giants, and Houston Astros; and the American League (AL) Cleveland Indians, Texas Rangers, Kansas City Royals, and Boston Red Sox. James played first base, third base, outfield, and designated hitter.

== Early life ==
James attended Alto High School in Texas where he was an all-district quarterback. Between the football and baseball seasons of his senior year, he transferred to Stratford High School, from which he graduated in 1981. He initially accepted and then declined a scholarship to play college football at Southern Methodist University where his brother, Craig James, was a running back. He chose instead to enroll at Blinn College to play college baseball.

== Career ==
On May 4, 1991, while playing for the Indians, James had nine runs batted in (RBI) in a 20-6 win over the Oakland Athletics, thereby setting that franchise’s single-game RBI record.

In 946 games over 10 seasons, James posted a .261 batting average (794-for-3040) with 343 runs, 90 home runs, 386 RBI and 193 bases on balls. Defensively, he finished his career with an overall .982 fielding percentage.
