= Dee Ann Story =

American archaeologist

- Born: December 12, 1931; Houston
- Died: December 26, 2010 (aged 79); Wimberley
- Alma mater: Texas Woman's University; University of Texas at Austin; University of California, Los Angeles
- Occupation: Archaeologist
- Employer: University of Texas at Austin

Dee Ann Story (née Suhm; December 12, 1931 – December 26, 2010) was an American archaeologist. Story lived in Wimberley, Texas, and was a professor at the University of Texas at Austin. Story's best-known excavations were the George C. Davis and Deshazo sites. Story's work with Caddo Mounds State Historic Site, took place in the 1960s and 1970s and pinpointed the timeline of the area. She brought more advanced techniques to the dig, such as radiocarbon dating. Story was also the first woman hired to work as a professional archaeologist for the state of Texas.

== Biography ==
Story was born in Houston on December 12, 1931. Story developed a love of nature as a child. She attended Texas Women's University and then finished her bachelor's degree in anthropology at the University of Texas at Austin in 1953. In 1956, she finished her master's degree at UT Austin. Story attended the University of California at Los Angeles, where she earned her PhD in 1963. She was one of the first women to earn an anthropology PhD from the University.

She died on December 26, 2010, after a "lengthy battle with cancer."

== Career ==
Story's early work in archaeology began as an undergraduate at the University of Texas at Austin where she sorted and organized artifacts uncovered by the Works Progress Administration (WPA). While she was working towards her PhD, she became involved with the Glen Canyon Archaeological Project and worked with Jesse Jennings. She was the only woman on an all-male field crew in Glen Canyon and was hired because of her extensive prior field experience. She also ran the archaeological lab at the University of Utah to analyze the artifacts found in Glen Canyon.

Story became Texas' first professional woman archaeologist when she was hired in 1962 as the assistant director of the Texas Archeological Salvage Project. From 1963 to 1987, she served as the director of the Texas Archaeological Research Laboratory (TARL), which is a research unit at the University of Texas at Austin. In 1965, she was hired as a full professor at the University of Texas at Austin.

Story started working at the George C. Davis site in 1968. She had previous experience with Caddo artifacts, having found some while cataloging the WPA collection. Story not only worked with Caddo history, but she was also interested in working with contemporary Caddo people.

In 1987, she became a professor emeritus.

Story was awarded the Curtis D. Tunnell Lifetime Achievement Award and the Lifetime Achievement Award from the Texas Archeological Society.

Story donated all of her grey-literature to the library at the Center for Archaeological Studies on the Texas State University campus prior to her death in 2010.
