= Alto Independent School District =

Texas school district

Location
- 244 County Rd 2429; Alto, Texas ESC Region 7 USA
- Coordinates: 31°39′36″N 95°4′25″W

District information
- Type: Independent school district
- Grades: Pre-K through 12
- Superintendent: Kelly West
- Schools: 3 (2009-10)
- NCES District ID: 4807980

Students and staff
- Students: 682 (2010-11)
- Teachers: 65.94 (2009-10) (on full-time equivalent (FTE) basis)
- Student–teacher ratio: 10.6 (2009-10)
- Athletic conference: UIL Class 1A Football Division I
- District mascot: Yellowjackets
- Colors: Black, Gold

Other information
- TEA District Accountability Rating for 2011-12: Academically Acceptable
- Website: Alto ISD

The Alto Independent School District is a school district based in Alto, Texas, United States. It is managed by a seven-person board of trustees led by President Jay Jones and consisting of Tad Scott, Aaron Low, Angela Hackney Jefferson, Stancy Skinner, Lionel Whitaker, and Charley Reid for the 2024-2025 school year . The superintendent is Kelly West. The district is also served by Angelina College, a community college located in Lufkin, Texas.

== Finances ==
As of the 2010–2011 school year, the appraised valuation of property in the district was $145,267,000. The maintenance tax rate was $0.104 and the bond tax rate was $0.027 per $100 of appraised valuation.

== Academic achievement ==
In 2011, the school district was rated "academically acceptable" by the Texas Education Agency.

The historical district TEA accountability ratings for the district were "academically acceptable" from 2004 to 2011.

== Schools ==
In the 2024-2025 school year, the district operated three schools.

- Alto High School, grades 9–12, principal Shanequa Redd-Dorsey
- Alto Middle School, grades 5–8, principal Kristin Lucas

In the 2011-2012 school year the principal was Kelly West and the enrollment was 216 students. The school colors are black and gold and the school mascot is the yellowjacket. In 2011, the school was rated "academically acceptable" by the Texas Education Agency. Since West took over, they have been listed as one of the best 150 middle schools in Texas by Texas Monthly.

- Alto Elementary School, prekindergarten-grade 4, principal Candis Mabry

== Special programs ==
=== Athletics ===
Alto High School participates in the boys' sports of baseball, basketball, football, and wrestling. The school participates in the girls' sports of basketball and softball. For the 2012 through 2014 school years, Alto High School played football in UIL Class 1A Division I.

== See also ==
- List of school districts in Texas
- List of high schools in Texas
