= Caddo Mounds State Historic Site =

Precontact Native American settlement in Texas,

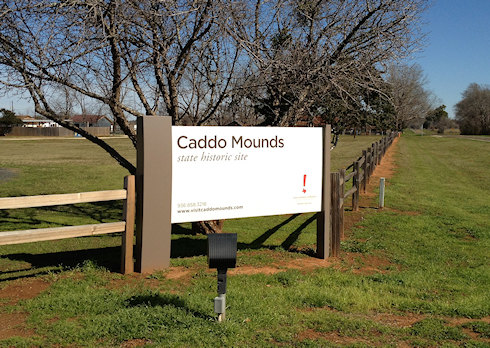
- Entrance to Caddo Mound State Historic Site (prior to 2019 tornado)

- Caddo Mounds State Historic Site (the United States)
- 31°35′47″N 95°8′55″W
- Cultures: Caddoan Mississippian culture
- Location: Weeping Mary, Texas

History
- Built: 780 CE
- Abandoned: 1260 CE

Site notes
- Area: 353 acres (143 ha) (Note: National Register of Historic Places acreage of which 93 acres are state maintained)
- Excavation dates: 1919, 1933, 1960s–1980s
- Archaeologists: James Edwin Pearce, E. B. Sayles, H. Perry Newell
- Management: Texas Historical Commission
- George C. Davis Site
- U.S. National Register of Historic Places
- Texas State Historic Site
- NRHP reference No.: 70000742 (original); 79003449 (increase)

Significant dates
- Added to NRHP: October 15, 1970
- Boundary increase: November 15, 1979
- Designated TSHS: 1974

Caddo Mounds State Historic Site (41CE19) (also known as the George C. Davis Site) is an archaeological site in Weeping Mary, Texas, United States. This Caddoan Mississippian culture site is composed of a village and ceremonial center that features two earthwork platform mounds and one burial mound. Located on a precontact Native American trail later named by the Spanish as El Camino Real de los Tejas, the settlement developed hundreds of years before the arrival of Europeans to the region. Archaeologists believe the site was created in approximately 800 CE, with most major construction taking place between 1100 and 1300 CE.

The Caddo Mounds site is located in East Texas, 6 miles (9.7 km) west of Alto on Texas State Highway 21 near its intersection with U.S. Route 69 in the Piney Woods region. Operated by the Texas Historical Commission, the museum at the site was reopened in October 2015. The new museum offers visitors a chance to explore a replica Caddo village, and all exhibits are hands-on. Visitors can walk the 0.7 miles (1.1 km) self-guided interpretive trail to see the Caddo burial, low temple, and ceremonial mounds. An additional trail along the El Camino Real is also available.

== Description ==
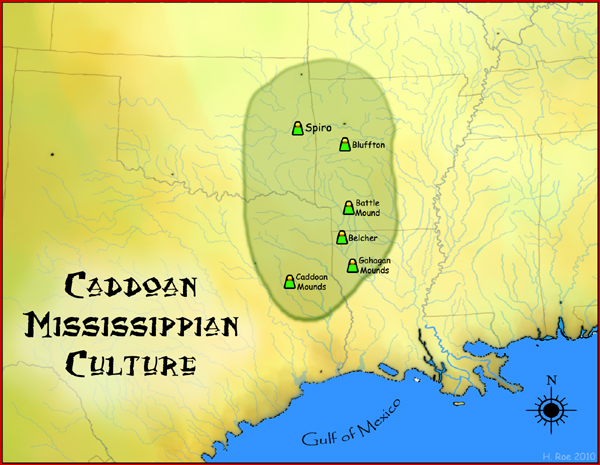
Map of Caddoan Mississippian sites

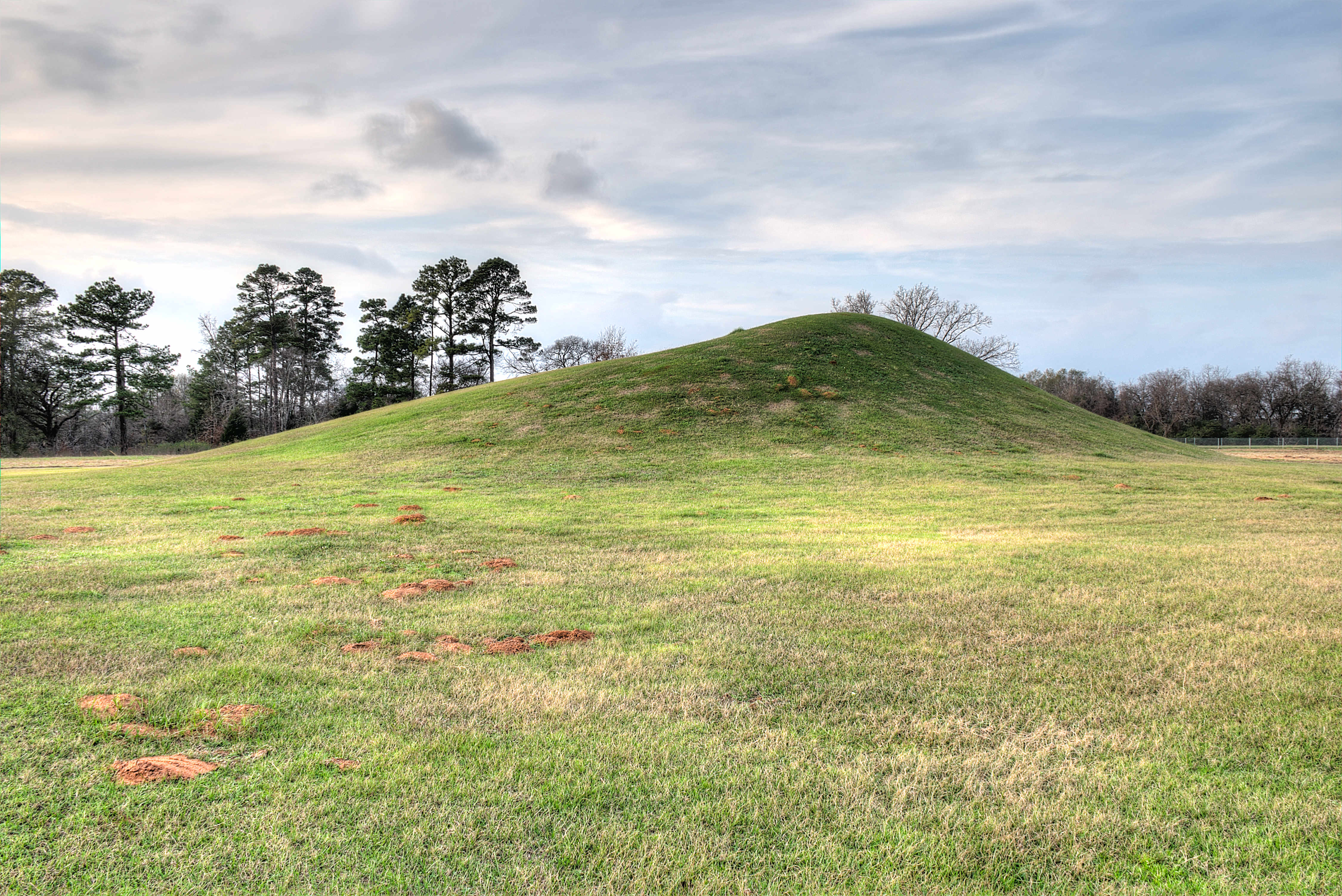
Burial mound at the Caddo Mounds State Historic Site. This mound was a cemetery for elite leaders and religious figures.

The site began with the founding of a permanent village by the Hasinai, who moved into the region from the Red River area to the northeast, in roughly 850 to 900 CE. The region had ideal qualities for a village: good soil, abundant food resources, and a permanent water source that flowed into the Neches River. What eventually became the largest mound, Mound A, was begun at this time. It is at the southern edge of the site and was surrounded by about 40 houses. In 1100 a new mound was begun near the center of the site, Mound B, and would eventually measure roughly 175 feet (53 meters) north-south and 115 feet (35 meters) east-west. Mound C, the northernmost mound of the three, was used as a burial mound, not for elite residences or temples like the other two. The site was the southwesternmost ceremonial mound center of all the great mound building cultures of North America.

The settlement was abandoned when the local Caddo ritually capped the mounds around 1250 CE and focused their activities from the east to west, according to their oral history. The outlying hamlets became more self-sufficient and grew less dependent on the site for religious and political matters. The Caddo culture that remained was similar to the earlier culture in many ways but was more egalitarian and did not import as many exotic goods.

By the time Europeans arrived in the area in the 18th century, the Caddo groups in the area lived in small villages and hamlets, spread across the local landscape, and which had more autonomous, local governmance.

The Hasinai groups continued to live in the Neches and Angelina River valleys up to the 1830s, but by the early 1840s, all Caddo groups had moved to the Brazos River area in an effort to avoid Anglo-American colonization. In 1855 the U.S. government moved them to the Brazos Indian Reservation. In 1859 it forced them to move again, to the Washita River in Indian Territory (now western Oklahoma). The Caddo still primarily live in western Oklahoma, and Binger, Oklahoma is the capital of the federally recognized Caddo Nation of Oklahoma.

== Modern excavations ==
The earliest recorded written mention of the mounds was in 1779 by Athanase de Mézières, who traveled from Louisiana to San Antonio in the employ of the Spanish government. In 1919 American James Edwin Pearce was the first professional archeologist to record the site for the Bureau of Ethnology (Smithsonian Institution). In 1933 archeologist E. B. Sayles concluded that the site was a Caddo mound center, after conducting surface collection of artifacts at the location.

The first scientific excavations were conducted from 1939 to 1941 by H. Perry Newell, a University of Texas archeologist with the federal Work Projects Administration in the government of President Franklin D. Roosevelt. When Newell died, archeologist Alex D. Krieger took over investigations at the site and concluded that it had been a major Caddo site. Further excavations in the 1960s and early 1970s by Dee Ann Story pinpointed the timeline of the site to 780 and 1260.

After acquiring seventy acres of the site, the Texas Parks and Wildlife Department established a historic park in 1974. It funded a series of excavations in the 1970s and 1980s. As a result of these excavations by the University of Texas at Austin, Texas A&M University, and private contractor Elton R. Prewitt, another twenty-three acres of land was added to the park in 1981. An interpretive visitors center was constructed at the site. In 2008, the 80th Texas Legislature transferred operational control of the property to the Texas Historical Commission.

The museum and members of the Caddo Nation of Oklahoma have collaborated on activities that help the public understand Caddo culture. In July 2016, elder Phil Cross was interviewed about construction of a Caddo grass house at the site, with workers using traditional techniques.

== 2019 Tornado ==
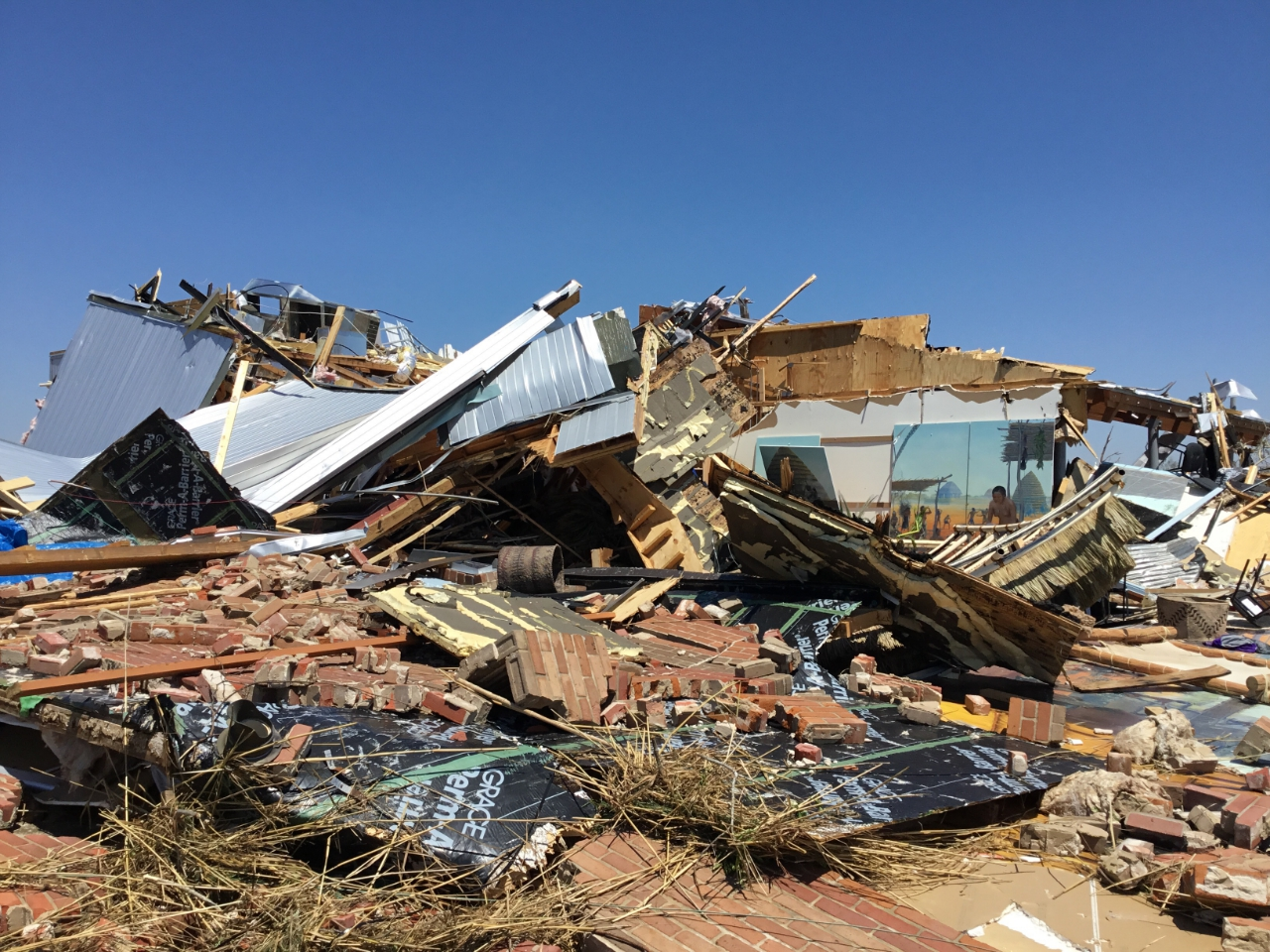
Damage to the Caddo Mounds State Historic Site museum

On April 13, 2019, during celebrations of Caddo Culture Day, an EF3 tornado struck the Mounds, killing one person and injuring 30 to 40, including 8 who were critically injured. Patients were transported to the hospital on a school bus or were life flighted. The mounds' visitor center and service buildings were heavily damaged, with a capital loss estimated at $2.5 million. The loss of the visitor center's museum-like display space destroyed many replica items, but actual artifacts had been withdrawn from public view long before by agreement between the Historical Commission and persons with standing in representation of the Caddo Confederacy of Native Americans.

== See also ==
- Battle Mound Site
- Spiro Mounds
- Caddo Nation of Oklahoma
- List of museums in East Texas
- List of Mississippian sites
- List of Texas State Historic Sites
- National Register of Historic Places listings in Texas
