= Alto, Texas =

Town in Cherokee County, Texas, United States

- Town
- Interactive map of Alto, Texas
- Coordinates: 31°39′04″N 95°04′15″W
- Country: United States
- State: Texas
- County: Cherokee
- Established: 1849

Government
  - Type: Mayor-council

Area
  - Total: 1.71 sq mi (4.42 km^{2})
- Elevation: 433 ft (132 m)

Population (2020)
  - Total: 1,027
  - Density: 727.3/sq mi (280.83/km^{2})
- Time zone: UTC-6 (Central (CST))
  - Summer (DST): UTC-5 (CDT)
- ZIP code: 75925
- Area code: 936
- FIPS code: 48-02188
- GNIS feature ID: 2412356
- Website: cityofalto.com

Alto is a town in Cherokee County, Texas, United States. With a population of 1,027 at the 2020 U.S. census, Alto is the closest municipality to the Caddo Mounds State Historic Site, an archaeological site dating back to 800 BC, featuring a prehistoric village and ceremonial center.

== History ==
An early settler in the region was Martin Lacy, who built Lacy's Fort just to the west to the current site of Alto around 1838. In 1838 and 1839, during the campaign to suppress the Córdova Rebellion, the fort served as an operations and supply base for the Third Militia brigade commanded by Maj. Gen. Thomas J. Rusk.

The town of Alto was laid out in 1849 and named for the Spanish word meaning "high" on account of the site's elevation on a drainage divide between the Neches and Angelina Rivers.

== Geography ==
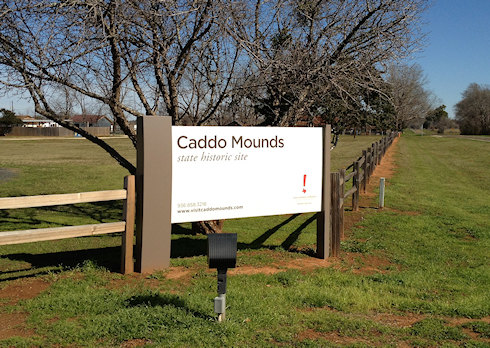
Caddo Mound Site near Alto, January 2012

According to the United States Census Bureau, the town has a total area of 1.7 square miles (4.4 km^{2}), all land. Alto had a prisoner of war camp during World War II, which served the Cherokee County area.

The climate in this area is characterized by hot, humid summers and generally mild to cool winters. According to the Köppen climate classification, Alto has a humid subtropical climate, Cfa on climate maps.

== Demographics ==
Historical population
Census	Pop.	Note	%±
1870	61		—
1880	88		44.3%
1890	210		138.6%
1910	672		—
1920	1,081		60.9%
1930	1,053		−2.6%
1940	1,141		8.4%
1950	1,021		−10.5%
1960	869		−14.9%
1970	1,045		20.3%
1980	1,203		15.1%
1990	1,027		−14.6%
2000	1,190		15.9%
2010	1,225		2.9%
2020	1,027		−16.2%
U.S. Decennial Census

Alto racial composition as of 2020 (NH = Non-Hispanic) (Note: Note: the US Census treats Hispanic/Latino as an ethnic category. This table excludes Latinos from the racial categories and assigns them to a separate category. Hispanics/Latinos can be of any race.)
Race	Number	Percentage
White (NH)	416	40.51%
Black or African American (NH)	268	26.1%
Native American or Alaska Native (NH)	2	0.19%
Asian (NH)	1	0.1%
Multiracial (NH)	38	3.7%
Hispanic or Latino	302	29.41%
Total	1,027	

As of the 2020 United States census, 1,027 people, 459 households, and 283 families resided in the town.

According to the 2000 U.S. census, 1,190 people, 452 households, and 282 families lived in the town. The population density was 707.1 inhabitants per square mile (273.0/km^{2}). The 534 housing units had an average density of 317.3 per square mile (122.5/km^{2}). The racial makeup of the town was 65.55% White, 24.79% African American, 0.50% Native American, 0.17% Asian, 6.81% from other races, and 2.18% from two or more races. Hispanics or Latinos of any race were 10.25% of the population.

== Education ==
Public schools are managed by the Alto Independent School District. These are Alto High School, Alto Middle School, and Alto Elementary School.

== Public safety ==
In 2011, the city eliminated its entire police force after the city council cut the police budget to zero, causing residents to brace for increased crime. A councilman is quoted as saying, "The police department, being a non-money-making entity, was the easiest to get rid of." Meanwhile, police services are provided by the county sheriff, and assuming the town's finances improve, it will be opened up again in December.

== Notable people ==
- James Z. Spearing, member of the United States House of Representatives from Louisiana's 2nd congressional district from 1924 to 1931, was born in Alto in 1864.
- George B. Terrell, member of the U.S. House of Representatives from Texas's at-large congressional district from 1924 to 1931.

== See also ==
- List of municipalities in Texas
