= Longview =

Longview or Long view may refer to:

== Places ==
=== Canada ===
- Longview, Alberta, a village
- Longview, British Columbia, a former cannery town
- Longview Range, British Columbia; a mountain range

=== United Kingdom ===
==== England ====
- Longview Psychiatric Unit, a hospital in Colchester
- Longview, an area of Huyton, Merseyside

=== United States ===
- Longview Army Airfield, Adak, Adak Island, Aleutian Islands, Alaska
- Long View High School, Lakewood, Colorado
- Longview, Illinois, a village in Champaign County
- Longview (Georgetown, Kentucky), listed on the NRHP in Scott County, Kentucky
- Longview, Louisville, a neighborhood of Louisville, Kentucky
- Longview (Gardner, Louisiana), an historic mansion
- Longview (Lutcher, Louisiana), listed on the NRHP in St. James Parish, Louisiana
- Longview, Mississippi, an unincorporated community in Oktibbeha County
- Longview, Missouri, an unincorporated community in McDonald County
- Longview Farm, Lee's Summit, Missouri; a farm
- Longview Lake, a reservoir in Jackson County, Missouri
- Long View Island (French: Ile Longue Vue), Thousand Islands, Saint-Lawrence River, New York State
- Longview School, Brewster, New York State
- Long View, North Carolina, a town in Burke and Catawba counties
- Long View Center, Raleigh, North Carolina; a historic church
- Longview Ranch Airport, Wheeler County, Oregon
- Longview (Nashville, Tennessee), an historic mansion
- Longview, Texas, a city in Gregg and Harrison counties
  - Longview metropolitan area, Texas
  - Longview Independent School District
  - Longview station, an Amtrak station
  - Longview High School
  - Longview Mall
- Longview, Washington, a city in Cowlitz County
  - Port of Longview, Washington; a seaport
  - Longview Bridge
  - Longview Public Schools, a school district
  - Longview Rail Yard (LVSW, a.k.a. Longview Switching); see List of rail yards
- Longview, Benton County, Washington, an unincorporated community
- Longview, West Virginia, an unincorporated community in Barbour County
- Longview Power Plant, Maidsville, West Virginia
- Longview Formation, Virginia; a geologic formation

== Music ==
- Longview (American band), an American bluegrass band
- Longview (British band), a British indie rock band
- "Longview" (song), by the band Green Day

== Groups, companies, organizations ==
- Longview Aviation Capital, a Canadian aviation holding company
- Longview Solutions, a BPM software company
- LongView Technologies, a software company
- Longview Switching, a rail subsidiary of BNSF; see List of common carrier freight railroads in the United States

== Other ==
- The Long View, a BBC Radio 4 history show presented by Jonathan Freedland
- Operation Longview (1942), a WWII landing operation at Amchitka during the Aleutian Islands campaign
- Longview (Transformers), several fictional characters
- Long View of London from Bankside, a panoramic etching made by Wenceslas Hollar in 1647
- USNS Longview (T-AGM-3), U.S. Navy Longview-class missile instrumentation ship
- Longview-class missile range instrumentation ship; see USNS Longview (T-AGM-3)

== See also ==
- Kelso-Longview Airport, Washington state, USA
- Longview–Marshall combined statistical area, Texas, USA
- Long View Farm, North Brookfield, Massachusetts, USA; a recording studio
- Longview race riot (1919), Longview, Texas, USA
- Longview Airport (disambiguation)
- Longview School District (disambiguation)
- Longue Vue (disambiguation)
