= Longview metropolitan area =

The Longview metropolitan area may refer to:

- The Longview metropolitan area, Texas, United States
- The Longview metropolitan area, Washington, United States

== See also ==
- Longview (disambiguation)
