= GTBR =

GTBR may refer to:

- Great Texas Balloon Race, an annual hot air balloon festival held in the vicinity of Longview, Texas, United States
- GTBR, the Delhi Metro station code for Guru Tegh Bahadur Nagar metro station, North West Delhi, India
