= East Texas A&M Lions =

Intercollegiate sports teams of East Texas A&M University

- University: East Texas A&M University
- Nickname: Lions
- NCAA: Division I
- Conference: Southland Conference
- Athletic director: Jim Curry
- Location: Commerce, Texas
- Varsity teams: 12
- Football stadium: Memorial Stadium (Capacity: 11,582)
- Basketball arena: The Field House (Capacity: 3,055)
- Softball stadium: John Cain Family Softball Field (Capacity: 800)
- Soccer stadium: Lion Soccer Field (Capacity: 500)
- Colors: Blue and gold
- Mascot: Lucky The Lion
- Fight song: "Texas A&M–Commerce Fight Song"
- Website: lionathletics.com

The East Texas A&M Lions (formerly the East Texas State Lions and Texas A&M–Commerce Lions) are the athletic teams that represent East Texas A&M University, located in Commerce, Texas, in NCAA Division I intercollegiate sports. The Lions compete as members of the Southland Conference for all 12 varsity sports. East Texas A&M previously played in the Lone Star Conference from 1931 to 2022.

== Sports sponsored ==
Men's sports	Women's sports
Basketball	Basketball
Cross country	Cross country
Football	Golf
Golf	Soccer
Track and field^{†}	Softball
	Track and field^{†}
	Volleyball
† – Track and field includes both indoor and outdoor

=== Men's basketball ===
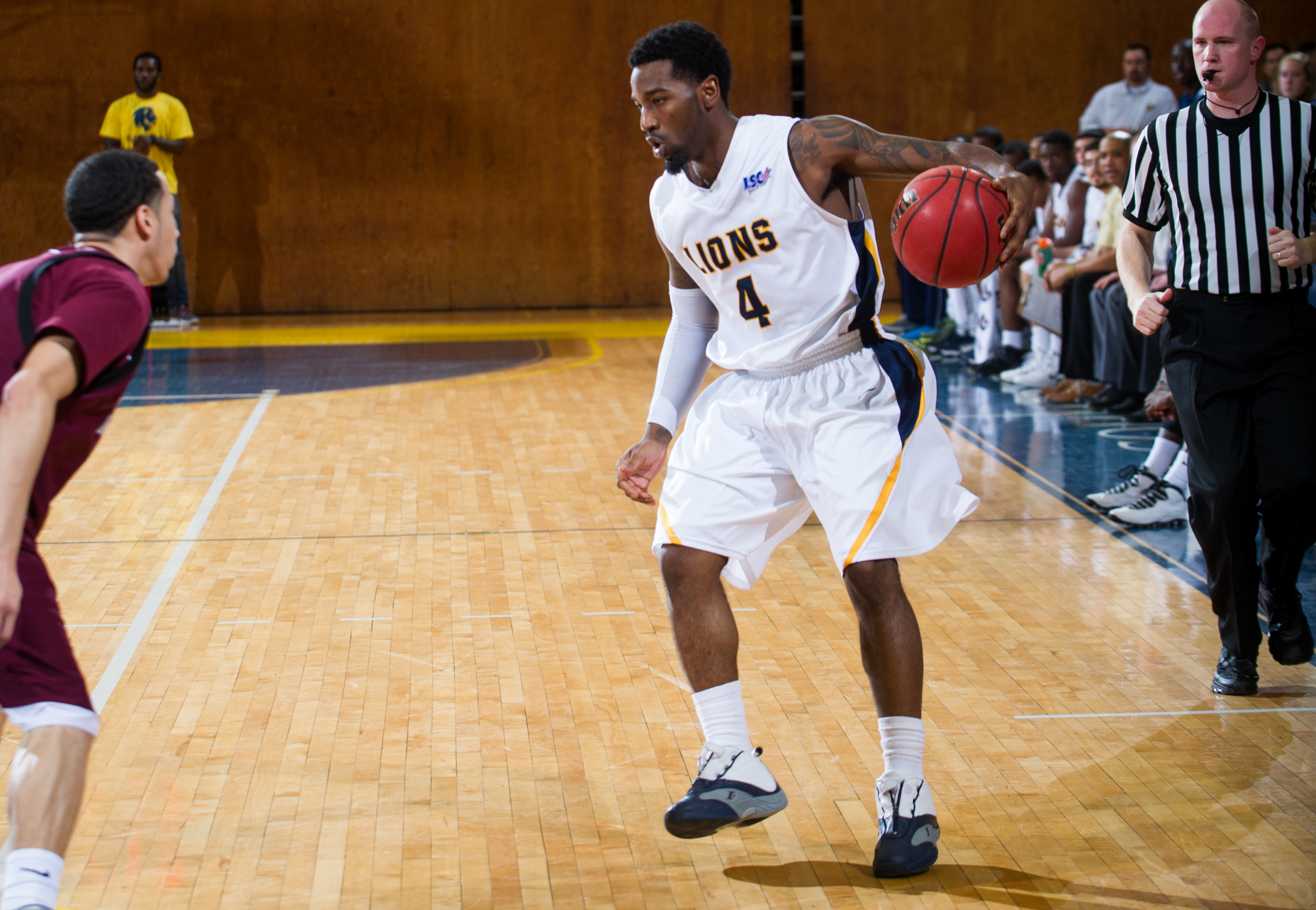
The TAMUE men's basketball team in action against West Texas A&M in 2014

- Head Coach-Jaret von Rosenberg

The men's basketball team has won almost 1,300 games in the program's history, 20 conference titles, and won the national championship during the 1954–1955 season. The team was featured as an opponent of Texas Western University's (now The University of Texas at El Paso) historic color barrier breaking team in the Walt Disney film Glory Road during the 1966 season. The game was shown as being played in Commerce as the arena it was shot in had very close resemblance to the University Fieldhouse, where the Lions play to this day. ETAMU continues to be one of the best programs in the Lone Star Conference for Men's Basketball.

=== Women's basketball ===
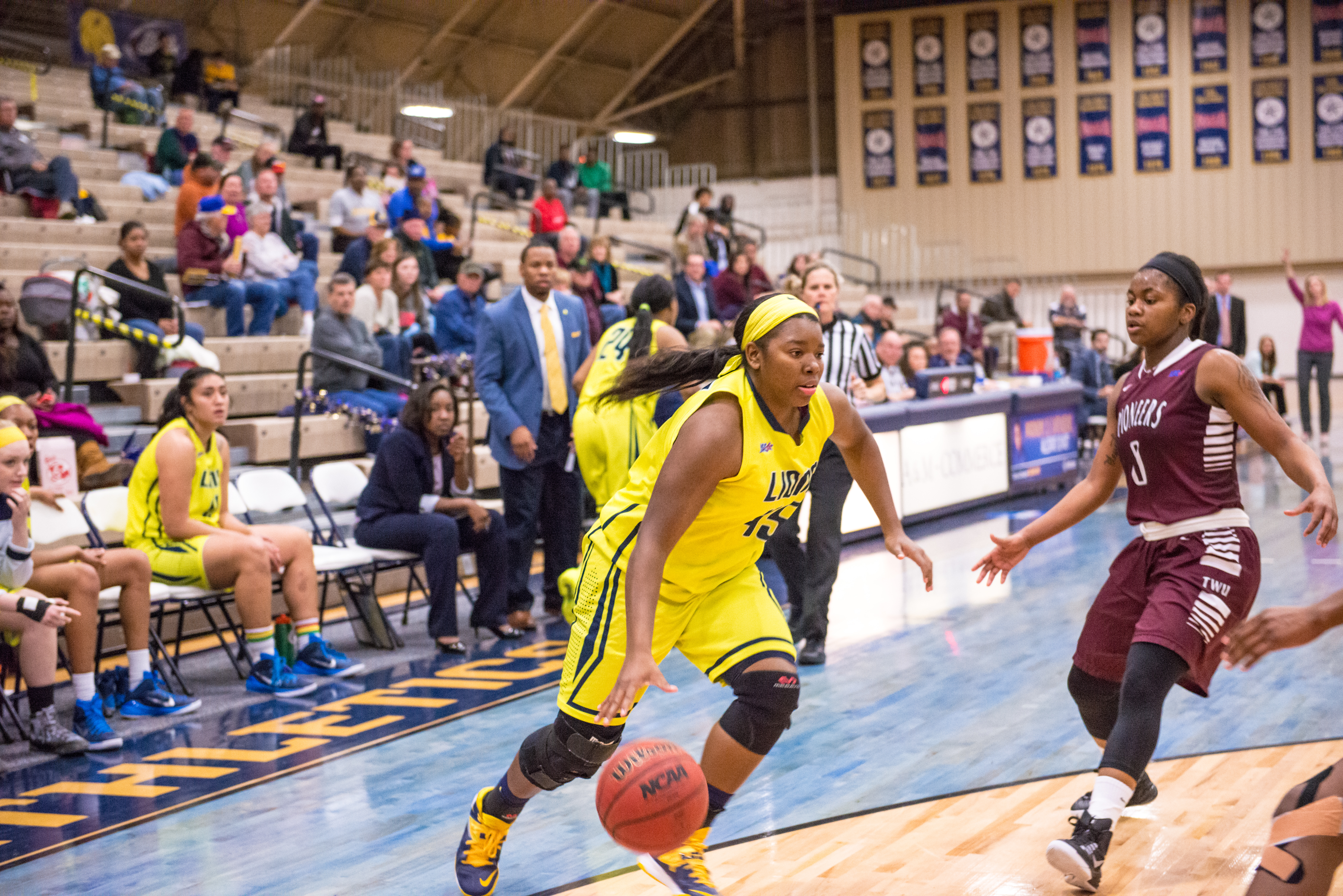
The ETAMU women's basketball team in action against TWU in 2015

- Head Coach-Valerie King

ETAMU's Lady Lions Basketball made a run at a national championship in 2006–07, finishing in the NCAA Division II Elite 8. That same year, they won their first and to date, only conference championship.

=== Football ===
- Head Coach-Clint Dolezel

The Lions have had 18 coaches in the program's history, and in the spring of 2013 announced the 19th coach in the program's history, naming Colby Carthel, a former assistant coach at conference rival West Texas A&M University to be head coach. The Lions have to their credit five collegiate Bowl Victories, two conference division titles, 22 outright conference titles, and two national championships in 1972 and 2017. The program has produced many NFL players and had also produced an above average number of professional standouts for a school its size. The Lions play their home games at Ernest Hawkins Field at Memorial Stadium in Commerce, Texas. ETAMU is one of the few schools in the conference who has an on-campus stadium that is owned and operated by the school and not the city in which it resides. The 2015 season marked the 100th season that the Lions have been playing college football.

The first coach in the history of the program was Marion Mayo, who coached one season, winning two games and losing one. The first game ever played in program history was Commerce High School Vs. East Texas Normal College (then the name of ETAMU), played at Commerce City Park. Mayo only stayed for one season. The next coach was B.H. Miller, who like Mayo, coached for one season, winning one game, and losing one game. The following coaches would later come to Commerce to coach, none staying longer than five seasons. The program struggled for most of the first 16 seasons. The coaches in the early days were Johnny Garrity (1916–17, 5–6–1 record), E.M. Tipton (1919, 4–1–1 record), Cecil Cushman (1920, 2–5–1 record), Russell Jernigan, (1921–23, 9–15–1 record), Joe Murphy (1924–1928, 8–31–3 record), and Will Hill-Acker (1929–30, 2–13–1).

In 1931, the Lone Star Conference was formed. The teams competing in the conference were East Texas State (now East Texas A&M), North Texas State (now University of North Texas), Sam Houston State University, Southwest Texas State (now Texas State University), and Stephen F. Austin State University. Before ETAMU moved to Division I FCS in 2022, it was the only charter LSC member still in the conference and Division II; the other schools moved up to FBS status (North Texas and Texas State) or FCS (SFA and Sam Houston; the latter has since moved to FBS). J.W. Rollins became the head coach in 1931, the first year in the league. It would not take long before the Lions established themselves as an LSC elite team. The first conference title was captured with Rollins 1933 squad, and he repeated the task in 1934. Rollins left after the 1934 season, and Robert "Bob" Berry became the head coach. Berry was immensely successful, posting a 72–34–8 record. Berry did not coach during World War II, though the Lions fielded a team in the 1942 season, with Dennis Vinzant as the coach, posting a 4–3–1 record. The Lions did not field a team from 1943 to 1945 during World War II. After the war years, Berry came back to coach the Lions from 1946 to 1950, leaving as by far the best coach in program history up to that point, winning four conference championships, and in the short 1942 season which Vinzant coached, the Lions also won the conference, laying the foundation for the next 50 years.

When Berry left Commerce, Milburn Smith became the head football coach. Smith was incredibly successful, winning 30 games in 3 seasons, only losing twice, and tying once and winning three conference titles. He got the Lions invited to the Tangerine Bowl in Orlando, Florida twice, Smith's Lions blew out Tennessee Tech 33–0 in the 1953 game, and tied Arkansas State 7–7 the next year. Smith however, left Commerce and moved back to his home area of East Texas, deciding to coach at Longview High School in Longview, Texas despite his immense success on the college level.

After Smith left, Jules V. Sikes became the head coach after being the head coach at the University of Kansas. Sikes decided to take the job as he had coached basketball at East Texas State from 1931 to 1935 and the ETSU job was very much coveted. Sikes returned to Commerce, coaching from 1954 to 1963, winning 5 conference championships and two more Tangerine Bowl games in 1957 and 1958. Sikes also put together teams that were based on the T-Formation running attack. Much of the success was due to ETSU's powerful running game against teams that were faster but smaller, allowing the Lions to grind the games to low scoring but winning affairs. Sikes had amassed a 63–34–4 record before dying in the spring of 1964.

ETSU then named Assistant Head Coach Ernest Hawkins, a former standout athlete at Texas Tech University as head coach. Hawkins kept a run heavy offense and a punishing defense as his mode of operation, but also became the first Lion coach to incorporate somewhat of a passing game to complement the strong running game. Hawkins would win 132 games from 1964 to 1985. In 1972, Hawkins led the Lions to a national championship with a 10–2 record. The 1972 team featured future NFL professionals such as Harvey Martin, Autry Beamon, Kenneth Parks, and Will Cureton. Hawkins was quoted in 2011 as saying he believed that with the amount of talent on the field he had that Lions could "have beaten any Division I school that year, especially that day we won the national title." The Lions made another run at a national title in 1980 behind future NFL-All Pro Quarterback Wade Wilson. The Lions won the conference again and defeated the University of Central Arkansas in the national quarterfinal round, but lost in the national semi-final game narrowly to eventual national champion Elon College. In 1984, Alan Veingrad was named Lone Star All-Conference, Lone Star Offensive Lineman of the Year and received Division II and national strength & conditioning All-American honors.

Hawkins retired at the end of the 1985 season, and Eddie Vowell, the defensive coordinator, was named head coach. The Lions struggled in Vowell's first two seasons but then in Vowell's third year, the Lions returned to LSC contender status. In 1990 the Lions won the LSC for the 23rd time and went to the NCAA playoffs, beating Grand Valley State in the first round, but lost to perennial Division II power Pittsburg State University in the national quarterfinals. The 1991 season saw the Lions get revenge on Pittsburg State during the regular season, snapping the Gorilla's 56 game winning streak, and win the LSC for the last time. Expectations were raised higher and higher after every game and many believed the Lions were the best team in the nation. However, the Lions faced off with PSU in the NCAA quarterfinals again, and the Gorillas avenged their loss 38–28 en route to a national championship. Despite bowing out in the quarterfinals, the Lions finished as the second best team in the country in Division II.

In 1995 the Lions made the playoffs finishing second in the conference. The Lions received a tough first round draw against a Tim Walsh led Portland State Vikings team. Walsh was an offensive minded coach who had kept the Mouse Davis implemented a run and shoot offense at Portland. The Lions fell behind early, never having faced a passing team like Walsh's Vikings, but the Lions had a balanced offense and ended up losing in a shootout that caused the Vikings to keep their starters in the game to beat the Lions, 56–35. Vowell coached the Lions until the 1998 season, having one losing season in his final three years. He left Commerce with a 72–72 record. Vowell is credited with the immense success the Lions had in the late 1980s until mid-late 1990s.

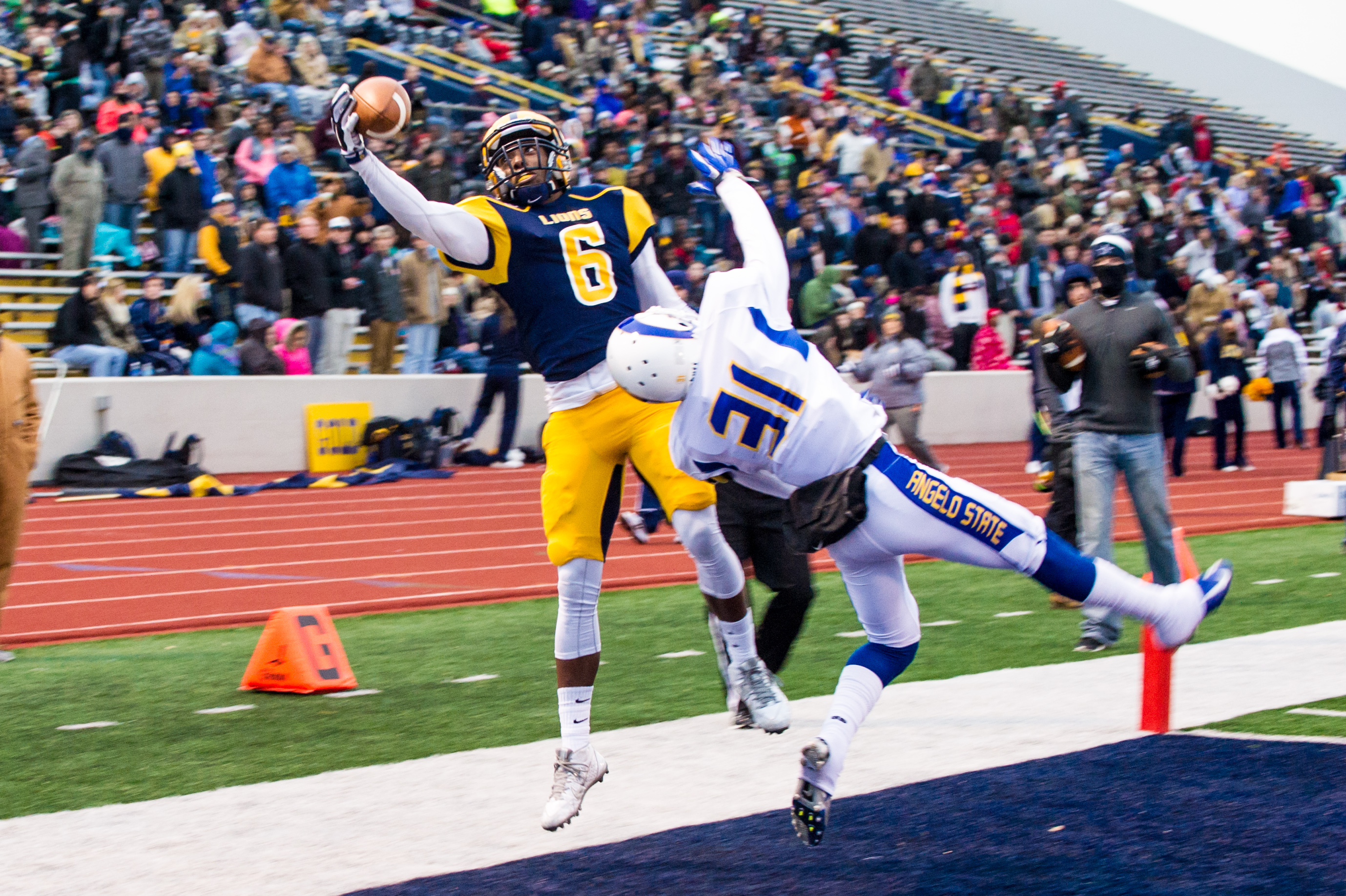
Vernon Johnson catching a pass against Angelo State in 2014

In 1996, East Texas State University was renamed Texas A&M University–Commerce. The previous year, the Texas A&M University System had purchased the university due to the desire of the A&M Board to have a strong education and smaller business school in its system. The first year that the Lions played under the A&M–Commerce moniker, the Lions had a solid 1996 season, and had to win their final two games of the year to make the playoffs again. However, in the next to last game of the year against a very weak Angelo State University team, A&M–Commerce lost a shocker and were left out of the playoffs. Since 1996, the Lions have not won a conference championship outright nor gotten to the playoffs, leading the student body to calling it the "A&M Curse."

After Vowell retired, the school hired Eddie Brister, the former offensive coordinator at Stephen F. Austin State University as the new head coach. Brister only lasted five seasons in Commerce and had only won winning record. Brister's first two years saw the Lions play Division I FCS schools and Division II powers, but finishing above average in the Lone Star conference, then the next two years, Brister scheduled smaller schools and the Lions rolled to a 7–4 season, but did not finish well in conference play. In his final two seasons, the Lions won 3 games combined and for the first time in school history went winless in LSC play in 2003.

In 2004, President Keith McFarland named A&M–Commerce alumnus Scott Conley head coach. Conley had won a national championship on the junior college level with Trinity Valley Community College and had served as an assistant at major programs like The University of Texas, The United States Naval Academy, Texas A&M, University of Arkansas, and Rice University. Conley's first season was a rebuilding year, but was made easier by the incoming transfer of Buster Faulkner, an All-American Quarterback from Valdosta State University who led the Lone Star Conference in passing, throwing for almost 3,000 yards in a 10-game season. Conley had two straight 5–5 seasons, but the Lions were improving.

In 2006, the Lions had a top 10 defense in all of Division II football, but a woeful offense and constant switching of quarterbacks led the Lions to a disappointing 5–5 season. The Lions were expected to break through in 2007, as the Lions returned their entire defense from the previous year and better offensive players. The Lions started the 2007 season and visited old playoff nemesis Pittsburg State in front of a national television audience and almost upset the Gorillas in a hard-fought 28–14 loss. Despite the loss, the Lions got a slot in the national poll at number 18. That ended as Ouachita Baptist came to Commerce and shocked the Lions on a last second field goal to win the game and knock the Lions out of the national picture. The Lions won the LSC North Division in 2007, but were left out of the playoff picture. Conley's final year was 2008, after going 5–5 for the fourth straight year, Conley was relieved of his duties and former Baylor University coach Guy Morriss was hired to replace Conley.

Morris brought several assistant coaches to Commerce with him that had Division I and NFL experience. Morriss was an All-American at TCU, had played in the NFL for the Philadelphia Eagles where he was an All-Pro lineman. Morriss has also coached at the University of Kentucky prior to Baylor and had coached under Hal Mumme, considered the father of the air raid offense, and current Washington State University coach Mike Leach. Morriss's father had also graduated from Texas A&M–Commerce and admitted a kinship for the school. In his first year, the Lions went 5–0 in Division play and won the North Division outright, and almost defeated long time rival Abilene Christian University at the Cotton Bowl in a rain soaked overtime game when ACU was No. 1 in the nation. However, Morriss regressed with each season, going 3–8 the next year, and 1–9 in each of his last two seasons. After the Lions final 2012 game, a 45–14 loss to West Texas A&M, Morriss announced his immediate resignation and that he would stay at Commerce working in the athletic department to raise funds and also enhance alumni relations.

In January 2013, University President Dr. Daniel Jones and new Athletic Director Ryan Ivey announced the hiring of Colby Carthel as the new head coach. Carthel had great success in his first season, winning seven games, defeating two ranked teams, and playing in the Live United Texarkana Bowl. The bowl game was the Lions' first postseason appearance in 18 years, finishing 7–5. The next season, the Lions would win the Lone Star Conference Championship outright for the first time since 1990. Despite missing out on the playoffs, the Lions were invited to the CHAMPS Heart of Texas Bowl where they soundly defeated the East Central University Tigers. In 2015, Colby Carthel led the lions to the national playoffs for the first time in 20 years. The Lions were eliminated in the opening round in a 48–30 loss to Ferris State. The team finished off with an 8–4 overall record and won the Lone Star conference title for the second year in a row.

=== Golf ===
- Men's Head Coach - Jason Eslinger
- Women's Head Coach - Michael Shedd

The Lion Men Golf Team won a national championship in the spring of 1965.

=== Women's soccer ===
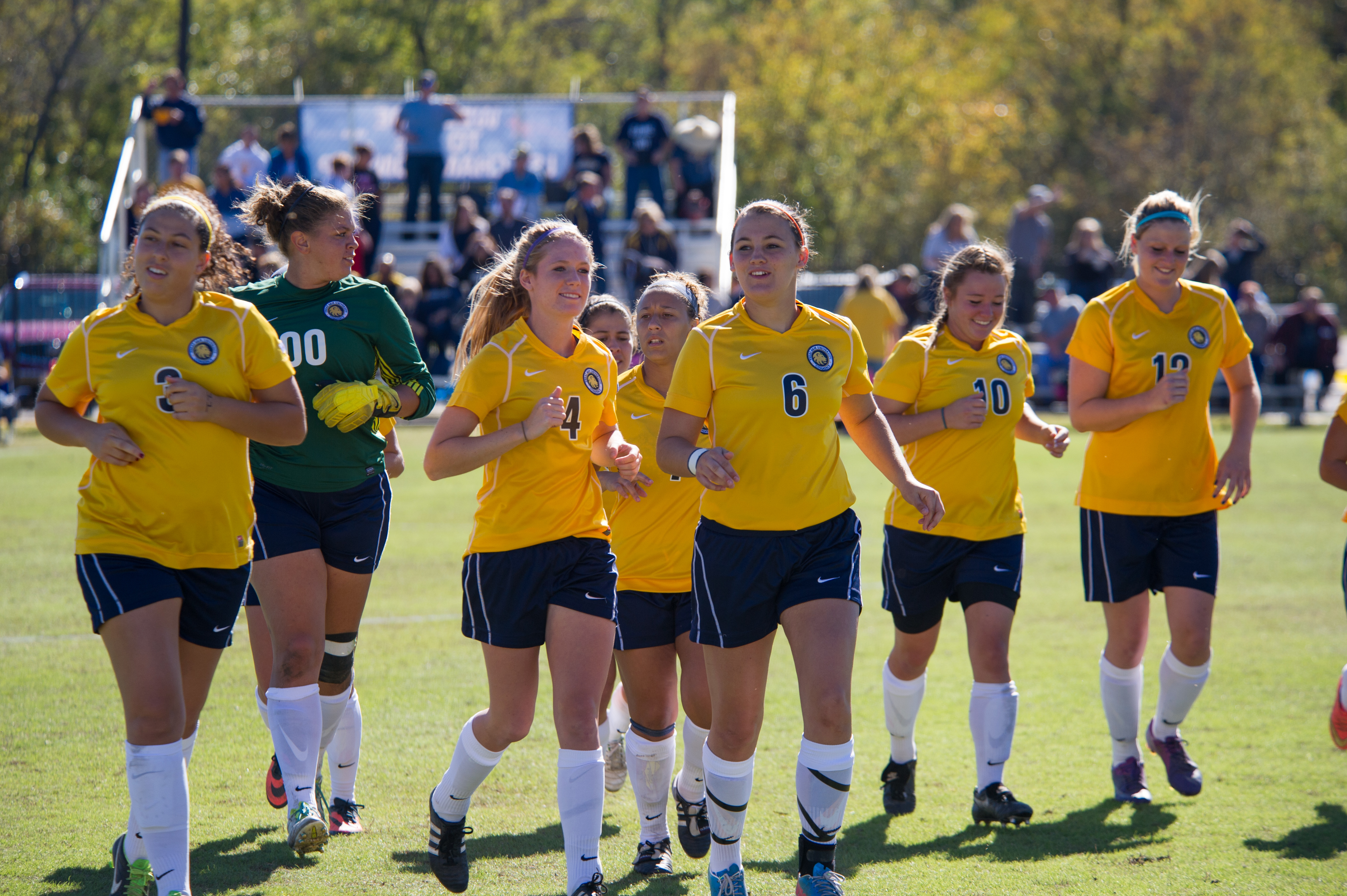
The ETAMU women's soccer team in 2014

- Head Coach-Ashley Gordon

The Lady Lion Soccer program is a conference power and a regional elite team. Since competition started in 1996, the Lady Lions have won the Conference Championship 4 times and have been to the NCAA Regional Soccer Championships four times.

=== Softball ===
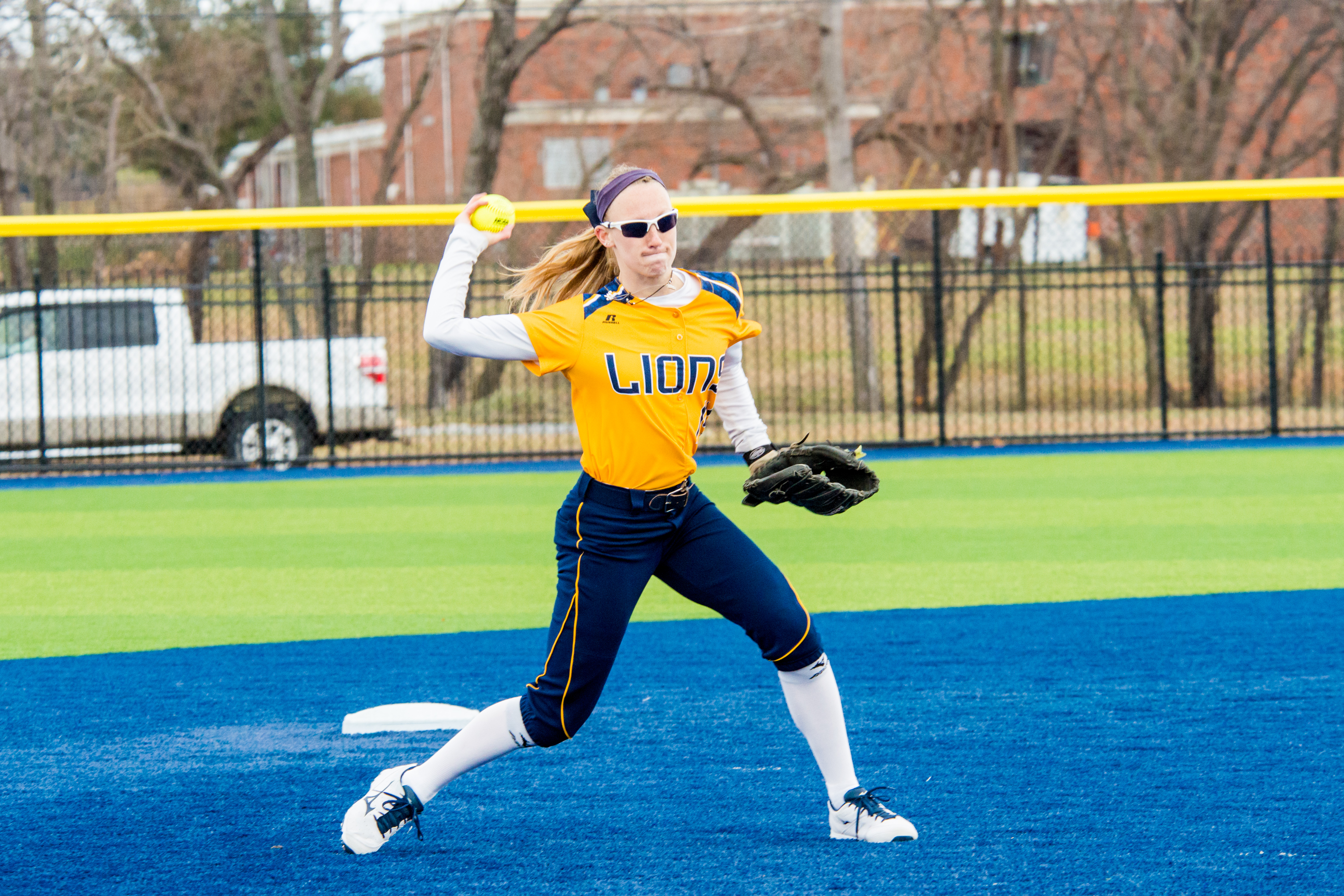
The ETAMU softball team in 2015

- Head coach-Rodney DeLong

The First ETAMU Softball team competed in the Spring of 2015. The ETAMU athletic department finished the construction of John Cain Family Softball Field, which features state of the art safe play turf, and is colored blue in the infield and has a Lion Head in the middle of the center field, identical to the logo in the middle of Memorial Stadium and the game court at the University Fieldhouse. The capacity is 800 at the softball stadium. It will also host UIL Texas State Softball playoff games and high school tournaments. The Lions made history as the first softball team in NCAA Division II history to reach the postseason in their second year of play. Lion softball has made the postseason in 2016, 2018, 2021, and 2022 and also won the Lone Star Conference Tournament in 2022.

=== Track and cross country ===
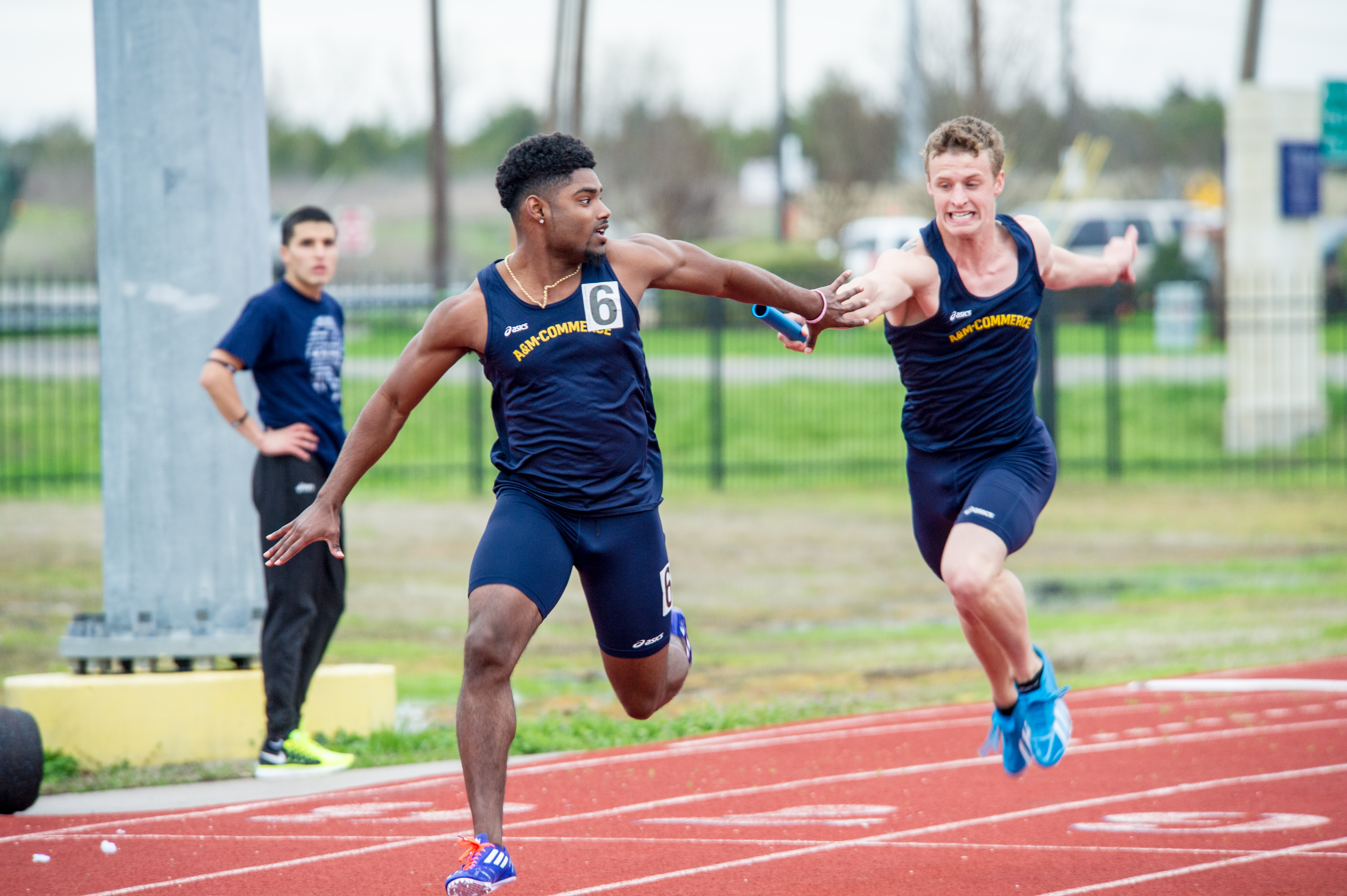
ETAMU men's track team at the Tarleton Dual Meet in 2015

- Head Cross Country and Track Coach - Rock Light

ETAMU has a rich tradition in Track and Field and also a strong Cross Country program. John Carlos, a world class sprinter ran at ETAMU as a member of the ETSU track team in the late 1960s and went to the Olympics in Mexico City where he, along with Tommy Smith, made the famous silent protest while accepting their medals. The Women's teams have also placed numerous All-American runners and athletes. ETAMU hosts an annual meet, the East Texas State Relays, named in honor of the name of the former school. The Cross Country programs have also strong traditions and have placed several athletes in the NCAA Championship meets. The Cross Country teams used to host a dual meet high school and collegiate meet in the Fall, named the Dr. Margo Harbison Invitational in honor of the former ETAMU Athletic Director, but was cancelled after the 2008 season.

=== Volleyball ===
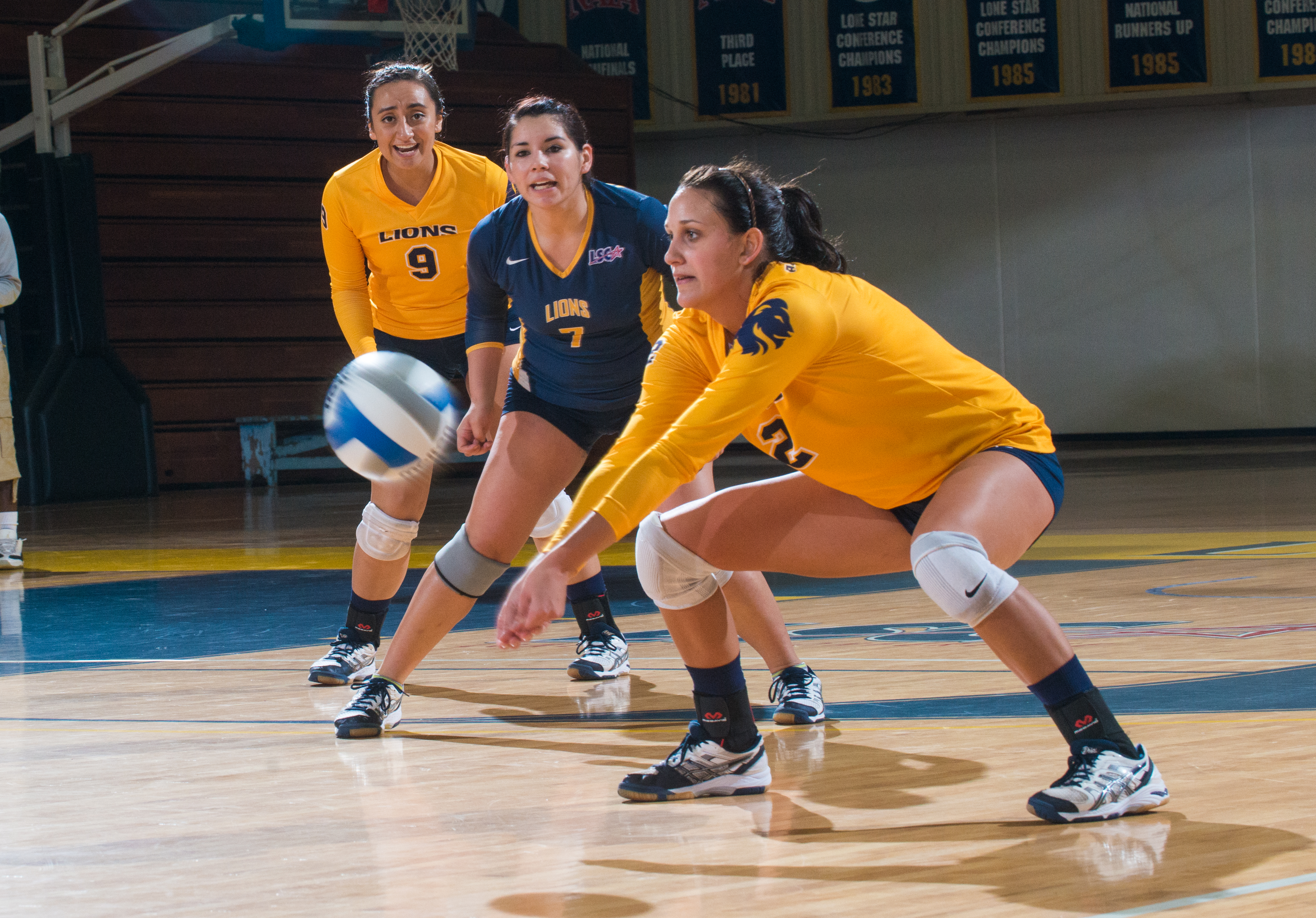
The ETAMU volleyball team in 2013

- Head Coach-Joe Morales

ETAMU's volleyball has been a consistently competitive program in the Lone Star Conference, frequently contending for conference championships. The team has produced numerous All-American players and holds a .600. During the 1980s, the program experienced a particularly strong period of success compared to many teams at the national level.

== Former sports ==
=== Baseball ===
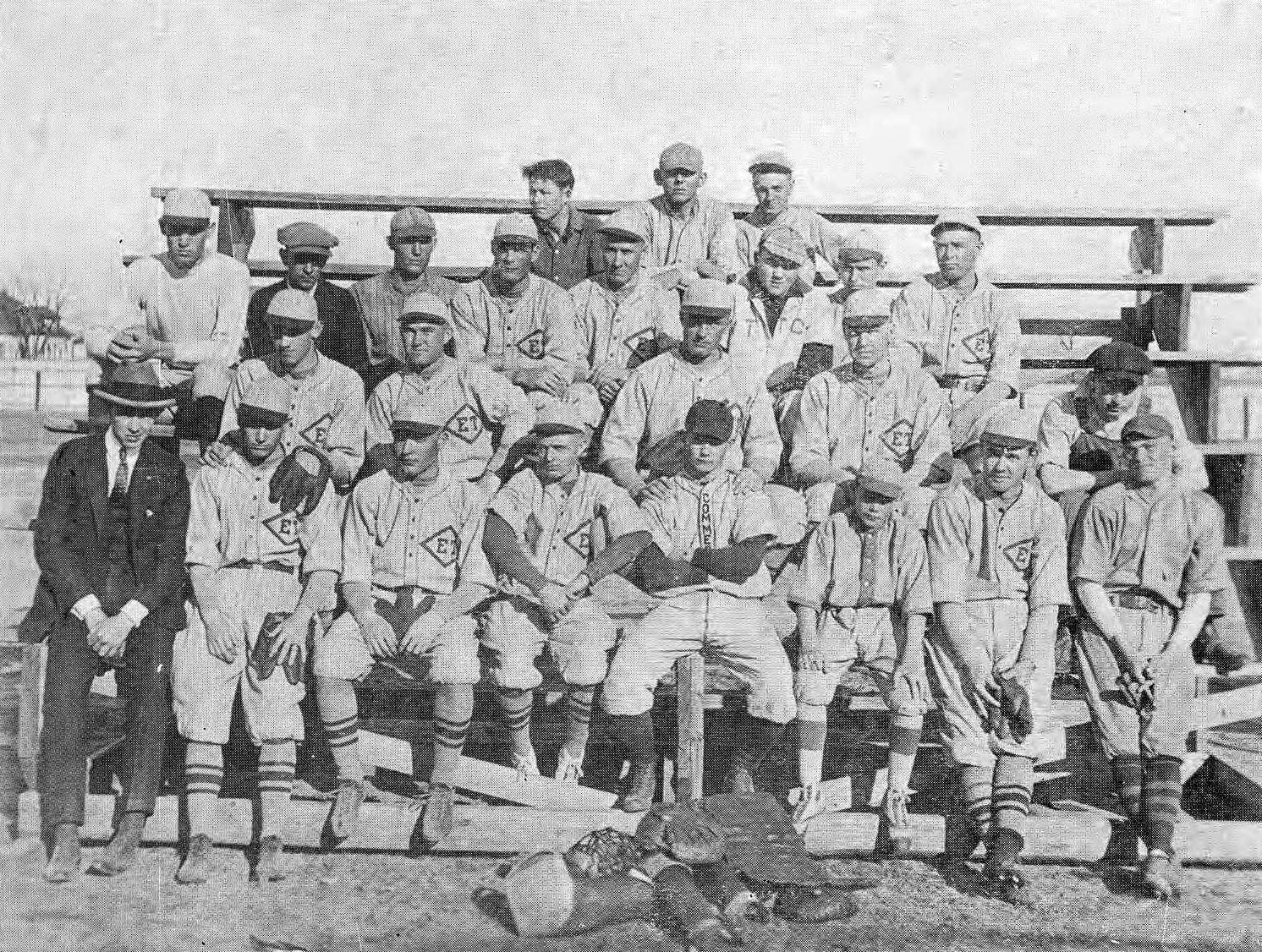
The 1922 baseball team

Back in the 1920s East Texas A&M had a baseball team that competed in the Texas Intercollegiate Athletic Association, and won several titles. The baseball team played against the Chicago White Sox in 1921 for spring training but lost 12 to 3.

By 1930, the university discontinued the baseball program due to financial issues.

=== Tennis ===
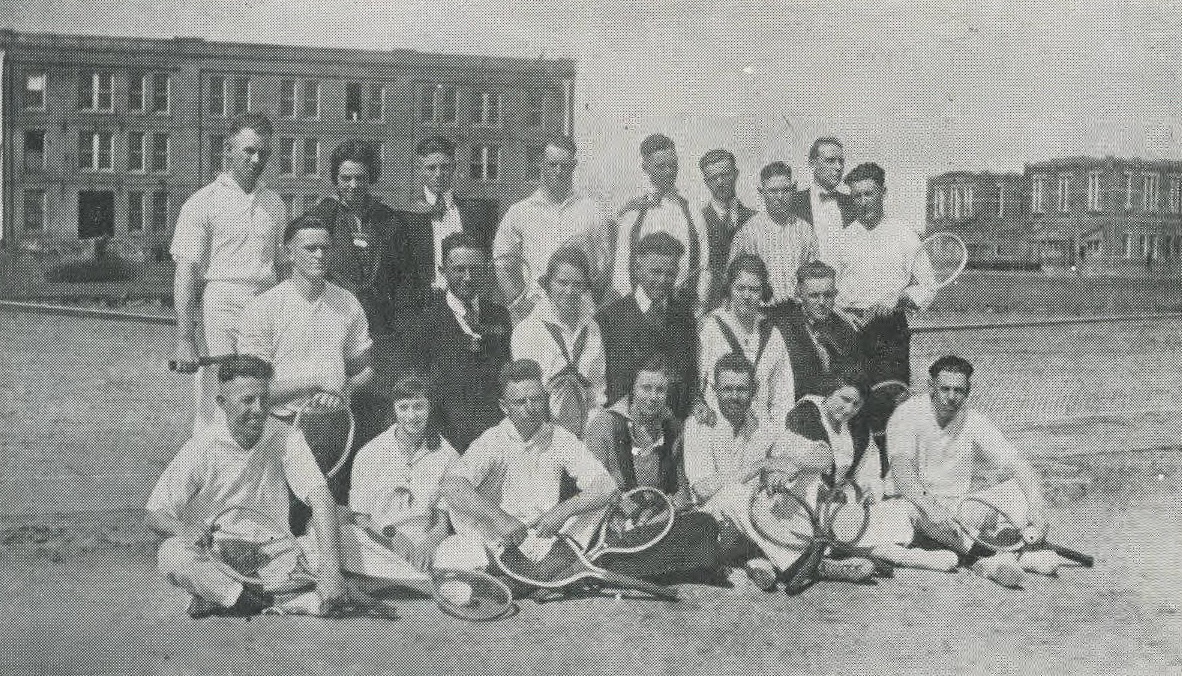
1920 tennis club

East Texas A&M no longer has a Tennis program for men or women due mainly to Title IX legislation that caused the university to make cuts to Men's sports to equally finance Women's sports. The tennis program was immensely successful, winning team national championships in 1972 and 1978 and numerous conference championships. Despite there being no team, there is still a top-of-the-line tennis facility that is directly across the street from the Morris Recreation Center that students use for private matches and also hosts high school tournaments and intrascholastic matches as well.

== Facilities ==
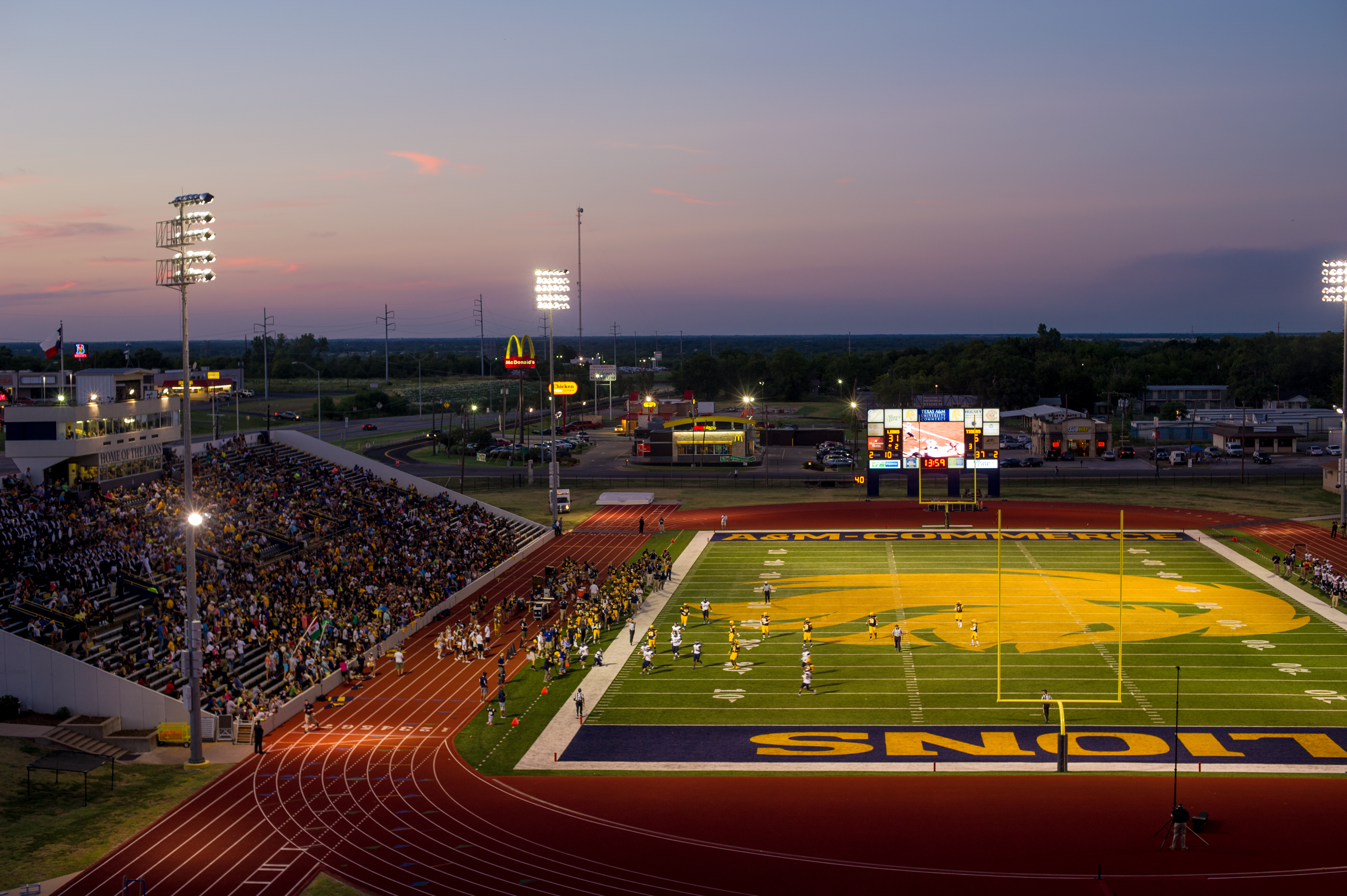
Ernest Hawkins Field at Memorial Stadium in 2014 during a football game between ETAMU and East Texas Baptist

Ernest Hawkins Field at Memorial Stadium is home to Lion Football, and the Men's and Women's track teams. ETAMU hosts its own invitational collegiate meet, in addition to hosting the conference championship meet on a regular basis. The Field House is home to Lady Lion Basketball, Lion Basketball, and Lady Lion Volleyball. Other athletic facilities are the Lady Lion Soccer Complex, one of the best in the Lone Star Conference, and the Cain Sports Complex, which is used for the campus intramural sports. The university recently got a softball team, home games will be held at the new John Cain Family Softball Field, the field is made entirely of turf and contains blue turf in the infield rather than traditional dirt, also a large lion head logo is located at center field similar to the logo seen at Memorial Stadium and the University Field House. The Cross Country program also hosts a dual collegiate and high school meet during the fall at Centennial Park in Commerce, the Dr. Margo Harbison Invitational.

The ETAMU athletic department also hosts the University Interscholastic League's Conference AAAA Region II Championships in Boys' and Girls' Track.

== Notable people ==
=== Notable alumni ===
- Wade Wilson, former NFL quarterback and former NFL quarterbacks coach for the Dallas Cowboys
- Harvey Martin, former All-Pro NFL defensive end and member of the NFL 1970s All-Decade Team
- Dwight White, former Pro Bowl NFL defensive end and member of the Pittsburgh Steelers' Steel Curtain defensive line
- Kevin Mathis, former NFL cornerback
- Lee Johnson, former NBA player
- Bob Carpenter, former NBA player
- Jake Carter, former NBA player
- Shelby Metcalf, member of 1954-55 men's basketball team that won the NAIA National championship, he coached the Texas A&M Aggies Men's Basketball team for 27 years.
- Mike Miller, current assistant coach of the Washington Wizards in the NBA
- Ross Hodge, current head coach of North Texas Men's Basketball Team
- Buck Fausett, former MLB player
- Dave Philley, former MLB player
- Herb Raybourn – former MLB player, scout, and New York Yankees Director of Latin American Operations
- Althea Byfield – Former professional basketball player and netball bronze medal winner for Jamaica
- Harry Fritz – Former professional tennis player, also was a member of East Texas State's men's tennis team that won the 1972 NAIA National championship
- Derrick Crawford, former Arena Football League defensive lineman
- Luis Perez, 2017 Harlon Hill Trophy winner and current quarterback for the New York Guardians. Previously also signed with the Birmingham Iron, Philadelphia Eagles, Detroit Lions and Los Angeles Rams
- Will Cureton, starting quarterback for the 1972 NAIA National Championship-winning Lions. Played for two seasons for the Cleveland Browns
- John Carlos, Olympic Medalist. Famed for raising his fist in protest during the medal ceremony following the men's 200m run in the 1968 Summer Olympics.
- Clint Dolezel, former Arena Football player for the Milwaukee Mustangs (1994–2001), Houston Thunderbears, Grand Rapids Rampage, Las Vegas Gladiators and Dallas Desperados. Won 3 Arena Bowl Championships combined as a player and later coach.
- Ricky Collins–CFL wide receiver for the Saskatchewan Roughriders
- Vernon Johnson–NFL wide receiver that is currently a Free agent
- Danny Mason–NFL linebacker for the Chicago Bears
- Charles Tuaau–NFL Nose tackle that is currently a Free agent
- Devondrick Walker– current professional basketball player for the Rockingham Flames
- Darrell Williams–Professional basketball player

== See also ==
- List of NCAA Division I institutions
