= Longview School District =

Longview School District may refer to:

- Longview Independent School District in Texas, USA
- Longview Public Schools in Washington State, USA

== See also ==
- Longview (disambiguation)
