= Longue Vue =

Longue Vue (English: Long View; French: telescope, spyglass, monocular) may refer to:

== Places ==
- Longue Vue Island, Thousand Islands, Saint-Lawrence River, New York State, USA
- Longue Vue Club and Golf Course, Penn Hills Township, Allegheny County, Pennsylvania, USA
- Longue Vue House and Gardens (a.k.a. "Longue Vue"), Lakewood, New Orleans, Louisiana, USA; an NRHP-listed site
- Longue Vue Manor, Clayton, Jefferson County, New York State, USA
- Longue Vue (estate), Hastings-on-Hudson, New York State, USA; the country home of William Howard Hoople
- Mont Longue-Vue, La Trinité-des-Monts municipality, Rimouski-Neigette Regional County Municipality, Bas-Saint-Laurent region, Quebec, Canada; a mountain and the source of the Brisson River (Rimouski River tributary)

== Literature ==
- Longue Vue (magazine), a magazine founded by Lélia Wanick Salgado
- La Longue-vue (1983), a work by Frédéric Musso
- Longue Vue (1993), a tale by Amélie Nothomb

== Other uses ==
- telescope (longue-vue), in 19th-century ship's nautical parlance

== See also ==
- Vue (disambiguation)
- Longview (disambiguation)
