= Longview Airport =

Longview Airport may refer to:

- East Texas Regional Airport, serving Longview, Texas
- Longview Ranch Airport, a private airport in Wheeler County, Oregon
- Southwest Washington Regional Airport, formerly known as Kelso-Longview Airport

== See also ==
- Longview (disambiguation)
