= East Mountain, Texas =

- City
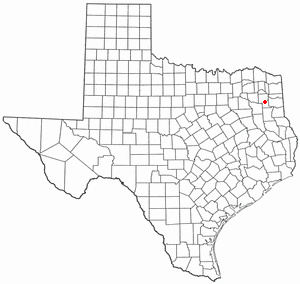
- Location of East Mountain, Texas

- Coordinates: 32°36′35″N 94°51′37″W
- Country: United States
- State: Texas
- County: Upshur, Gregg

Area
  - Total: 2.12 sq mi (5.50 km^{2})
  - Land: 2.12 sq mi (5.48 km^{2})
  - Water: 0.0077 sq mi (0.02 km^{2})
- Elevation: 436 ft (133 m)

Population (2020)
  - Total: 899
  - Density: 407.0/sq mi (157.14/km^{2})
- Time zone: UTC-6 (Central (CST))
  - Summer (DST): UTC-5 (CDT)
- ZIP code: 75644
- Area codes: 430, 903
- FIPS code: 48-22168
- GNIS feature ID: 2410388
- Website: www.eastmountaintx.com

East Mountain is a city in Upshur and Gregg Counties, Texas, United States. Its population was 899 at the 2020 census, an increase over the figure of 797 tabulated in 2010.

== Geography ==
East Mountain is located in southeastern Upshur County. Small portions of the city extend south along Gilmer Road and Coulter Road into Gregg County. The city limits extend northwest along Main Street and Medlin Road as far as East Mountain, a 660-foot (200 m) wooded summit overlooking the community.

East Mountain is 10 miles (16 km) northwest of Longview and 7 miles (11 km) northeast of Gladewater.

According to the United States Census Bureau, the city has a total area of 2.0 square miles (5.3 km^{2}), of which 0.01 sq mi (0.02 km^{2}), or 0.44%, is covered by water.

== Demographics ==
Historical population
Census	Pop.	Note	%±
1980	855		—
1990	762		−10.9%
2000	580		−23.9%
2010	797		37.4%
2020	899		12.8%
U.S. Decennial Census

=== 2020 census ===
As of the 2020 census, East Mountain had a population of 899, 356 households, and 250 families.

The median age was 42.9 years. 23.4% of residents were under the age of 18 and 20.1% of residents were 65 years of age or older. For every 100 females there were 106.7 males, and for every 100 females age 18 and over there were 102.6 males age 18 and over.

Of the 356 households, 33.1% had children under the age of 18 living in them. Of all households, 54.2% were married-couple households, 21.3% were households with a male householder and no spouse or partner present, and 20.5% were households with a female householder and no spouse or partner present. About 26.4% of all households were made up of individuals and 11.8% had someone living alone who was 65 years of age or older.

There were 396 housing units, of which 10.1% were vacant. The homeowner vacancy rate was 4.5% and the rental vacancy rate was 14.4%.

51.3% of residents lived in urban areas, while 48.7% lived in rural areas.

Racial composition as of the 2020 census
Race	Number	Percent
White	744	82.8%
Black or African American	15	1.7%
American Indian and Alaska Native	6	0.7%
Asian	3	0.3%
Native Hawaiian and Other Pacific Islander	0	0.0%
Some other race	61	6.8%
Two or more races	70	7.8%
Hispanic or Latino (of any race)	106	11.8%

=== 2000 census ===
As of the 2000 census, 580 people, 229 households, and 174 families were living in the city. The population density was 285.5 inhabitants per square mile (110.2/km^{2}). The 249 housing units had an average density of 122.6 per square mile (47.3/km^{2}). The racial makeup of the city was 94.14% White, 1.55% African American, 0.34% Native American, 0.17% Asian, 2.76% from other races, and 1.03% from two or more races. Hispanics or Latinos of any race were 3.45% of the population.

Of the 229 households, 28.8% had children under 18 living with them, 65.9% were married couples living together, 7.0% had a female householder with no husband present, and 24.0% were not families. About 20.1% of all households were made up of individuals, and 9.6% had someone living alone who was 65 or older. The average household size was 2.53 and the average family size was 2.91.

In the city, the age distribution was 24.7% under 18, 5.7% from 18 to 24, 25.5% from 25 to 44, 29.7% from 45 to 64, and 14.5% who were 65 or older. The median age was 41 years. For every 100 females, there were 91.4 males. For every 100 females 18 and over, there were 93.4 males.

The median income for a household in the city was $33,173, and for a family was $38,068. Males had a median income of $32,500 versus $21,827 for females. The per capita income for the city was $14,701. About 7.5% of families and 10.3% of the population were below the poverty line, including 15.3% of those under 18 and 3.3% of those 65 or over.

== Education ==
Almost all of East Mountain is in the Gilmer Independent School District, with a very small portion within the Union Grove Independent School District. The small portion of East Mountain in Gregg County is in the Longview Independent School District. Longview High School is that district's comprehensive high school.

Areas in Gilmer, Longview, and Union Grove ISDs are in the Kilgore Junior College service area.
