= Easton, Texas =

- City
- Seal

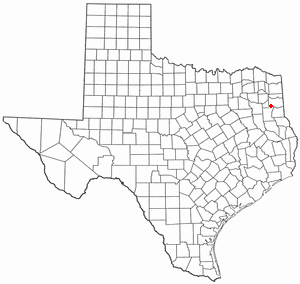
- Location of Easton, Texas

- Coordinates: 32°22′35″N 94°35′37″W
- Country: United States
- State: Texas
- Counties: Gregg, Rusk

Area
  - Total: 2.44 sq mi (6.33 km^{2})
  - Land: 2.44 sq mi (6.33 km^{2})
  - Water: 0 sq mi (0.00 km^{2})
- Elevation: 272 ft (83 m)

Population (2020)
  - Total: 499
  - Density: 204/sq mi (78.8/km^{2})
- Time zone: UTC-6 (Central (CST))
  - Summer (DST): UTC-5 (CDT)
- ZIP code: 75641
- Area codes: 903, 430
- FIPS code: 48-22192
- GNIS feature ID: 2410393
- Website: https://cityofeastontx.com/home

Easton is a city in Gregg and Rusk counties in the U.S. state of Texas. The population was 510 at the 2010 census, and 499 at the 2020 census.

== Geography ==
According to the United States Census Bureau, the city has a total area of 2.5 square miles (6.4 km^{2}), all land.

== Demographics ==
Historical population
Census	Pop.	Note	%±
1950	203		—
1960	220		8.4%
1970	297		35.0%
1980	333		12.1%
1990	401		20.4%
2000	524		30.7%
2010	510		−2.7%
2020	499		−2.2%
U.S. Decennial Census

=== Racial and ethnic composition ===
Easton city, Texas – Racial and ethnic composition Note: the US Census treats Hispanic/Latino as an ethnic category. This table excludes Latinos from the racial categories and assigns them to a separate category. Hispanics/Latinos may be of any race.
Race / Ethnicity (NH = Non-Hispanic)	Pop 2000	Pop 2010	Pop 2020	% 2000	% 2010	% 2020
White alone (NH)	89	56	59	16.98%	10.98%	11.82%
Black or African American alone (NH)	349	308	259	66.60%	60.39%	51.90%
Native American or Alaska Native alone (NH)	0	1	0	0.00%	0.20%	0.00%
Asian alone (NH)	0	7	0	0.00%	1.37%	0.00%
Native Hawaiian or Pacific Islander alone (NH)	0	0	1	0.00%	0.00%	0.20%
Other race alone (NH)	0	0	0	0.00%	0.00%	0.00%
Mixed race or Multiracial (NH)	4	0	7	0.76%	0.00%	1.40%
Hispanic or Latino (any race)	82	138	173	15.65%	27.06%	34.67%
Total	524	510	499	100.00%	100.00%	100.00%

=== 2020 census ===
As of the 2020 census, Easton had a population of 499. The median age was 41.1 years. 22.2% of residents were under the age of 18 and 13.0% of residents were 65 years of age or older. For every 100 females there were 94.9 males, and for every 100 females age 18 and over there were 81.3 males age 18 and over.

0.0% of residents lived in urban areas, while 100.0% lived in rural areas.

There were 188 households in Easton, of which 39.9% had children under the age of 18 living in them. Of all households, 46.3% were married-couple households, 14.9% were households with a male householder and no spouse or partner present, and 33.0% were households with a female householder and no spouse or partner present. About 21.8% of all households were made up of individuals and 9.6% had someone living alone who was 65 years of age or older.

There were 197 housing units, of which 4.6% were vacant. The homeowner vacancy rate was 0.0% and the rental vacancy rate was 0.0%.

Racial composition as of the 2020 census
Race	Number	Percent
White	62	12.4%
Black or African American	259	51.9%
American Indian and Alaska Native	8	1.6%
Asian	0	0.0%
Native Hawaiian and Other Pacific Islander	1	0.2%
Some other race	115	23.0%
Two or more races	54	10.8%

== Education ==
The Gregg County portion of Easton is served by the Longview Independent School District, while the Rusk County portion is served by the Tatum Independent School District.

Longview High School is the comprehensive high school of the Longview ISD part.

The service area of Kilgore College includes Longview ISD and the portions of Tatum ISD that are not in Panola County.

== Popular culture ==
"Easton, Texas" is the title of the fourth episode of the CBS Western television series Trackdown, starring Robert Culp as Texas Ranger Hoby Gilman. The episode aired on October 25, 1957.
