= East Texas A&M Lions women's volleyball =

American college volleyball team

- Founded: 1978; 48 years ago
- University: East Texas A&M University
- Head coach: Joe Morales (3rd season)
- Conference: Southland
- Location: Commerce, Texas, US
- Home arena: The Field House (capacity: 3,055)
- Nickname: Lions
- Colors: Blue and gold

AIAW/NCAA Regional Final
- 1986

AIAW/NCAA tournament appearance
- 1986, 1987, 1988, 2017, 2018, 2019

Conference tournament champion
- 1986, 2018

Conference regular season champion
- 1986, 1987

For information on all East Texas A&M sports, see East Texas A&M Lions

The East Texas A&M Lions women's volleyball team (formerly the East Texas State Lions and the Texas A&M–Commerce Lions) is the women's intercollegiate volleyball program representing East Texas A&M University. The school competes in the Southland Conference (SLC) in Division I of the National Collegiate Athletic Association (NCAA). For the first 44 years of existence, they competed in the Lone Star Conference of Division II. The East Texas A&M women's volleyball team plays its home games at the University Field House on the university campus in Commerce, Texas. The Lions have won two conference regular-season titles, an LSC tournament championship, and have appeared in the NCAA tournament on six occasions, three times during the tenure of head coach Kathy Goodlett (1983–89) and three under Craig Case.

The team is currently coached by Joe Morales.

== History ==
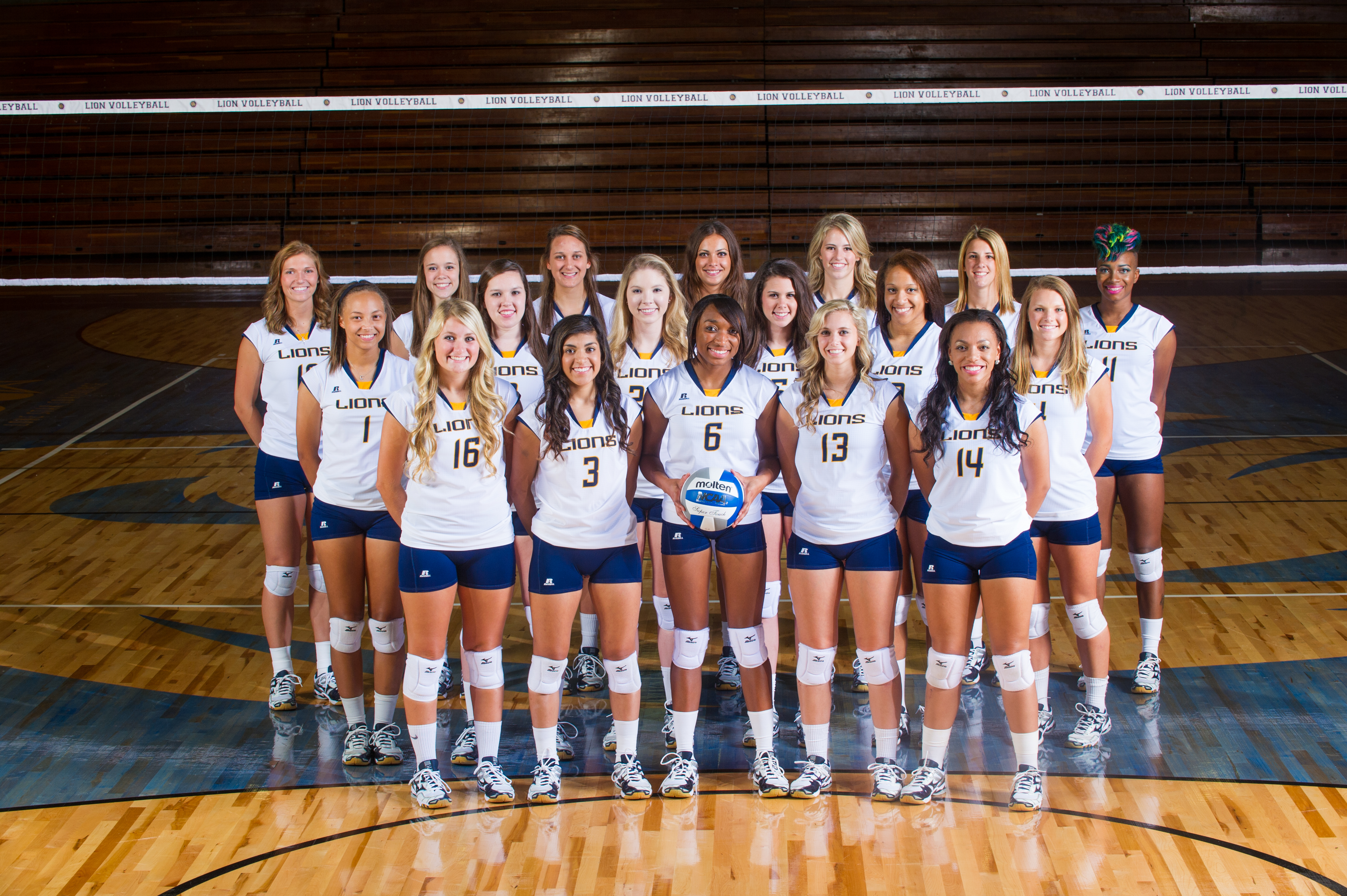
The 2014 A&M–Commerce women's volleyball team

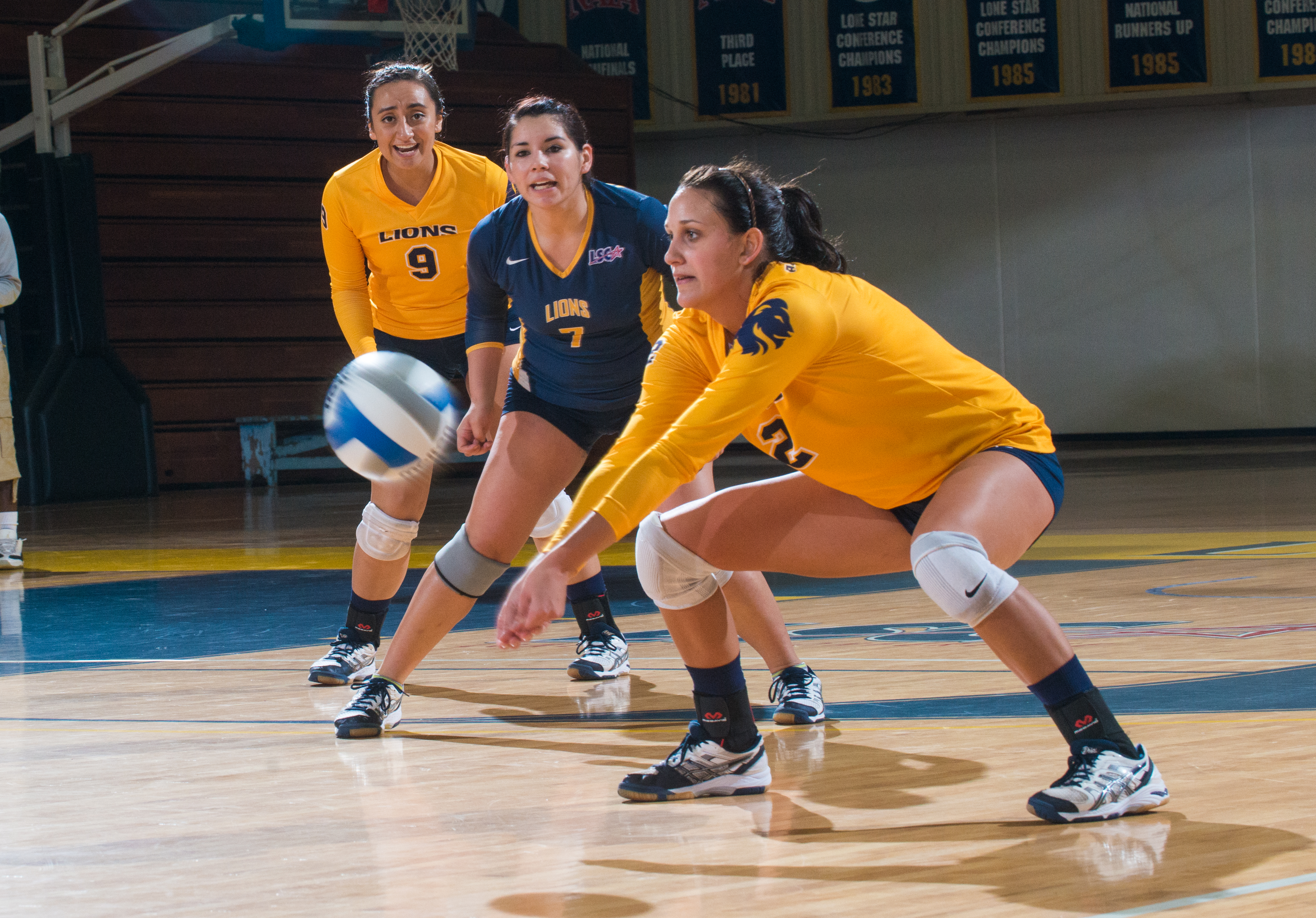
The 2013 team in action against the Texas A&M–Kingsville Javelinas

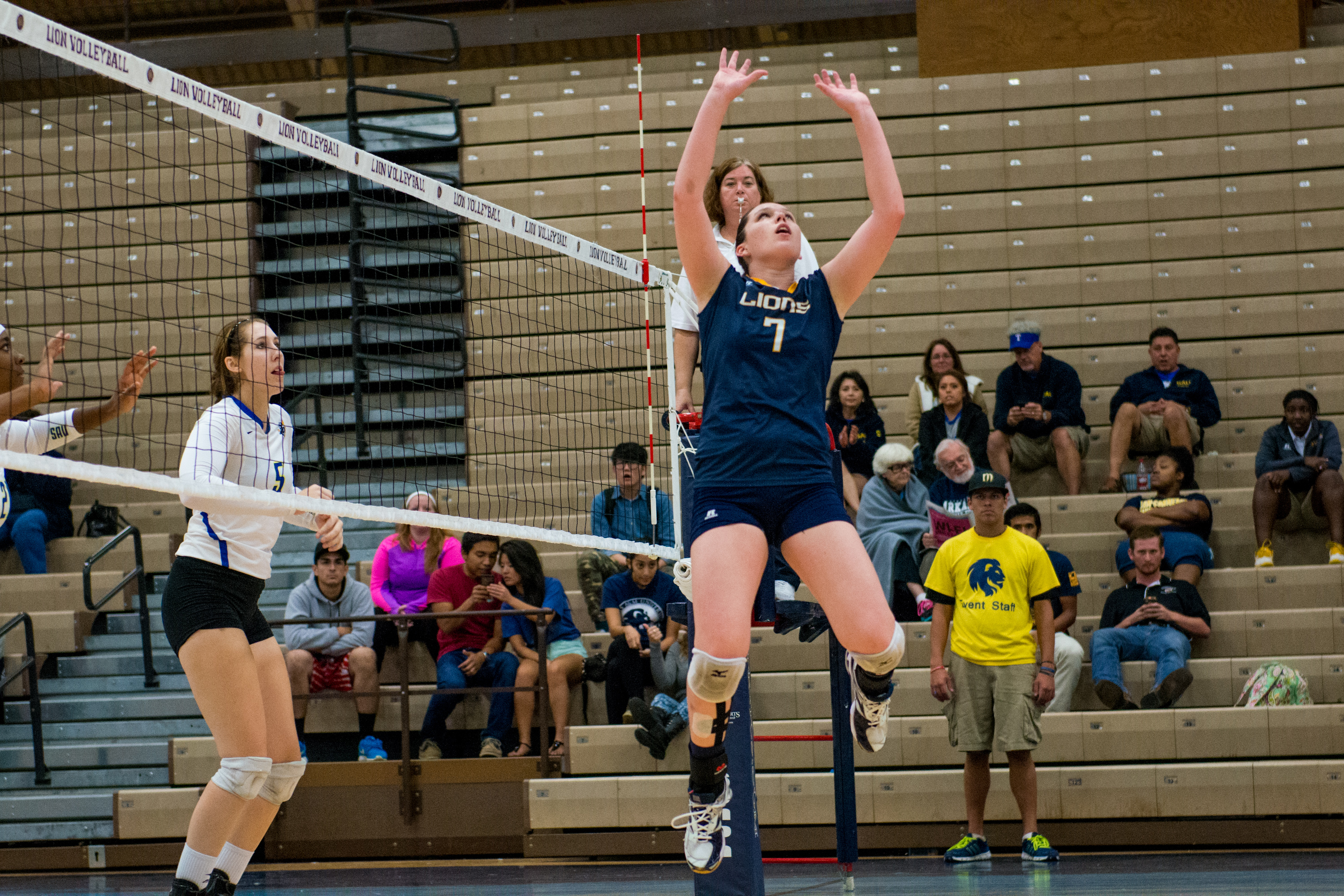
The 2014 team in action against the Southern Arkansas Muleriders

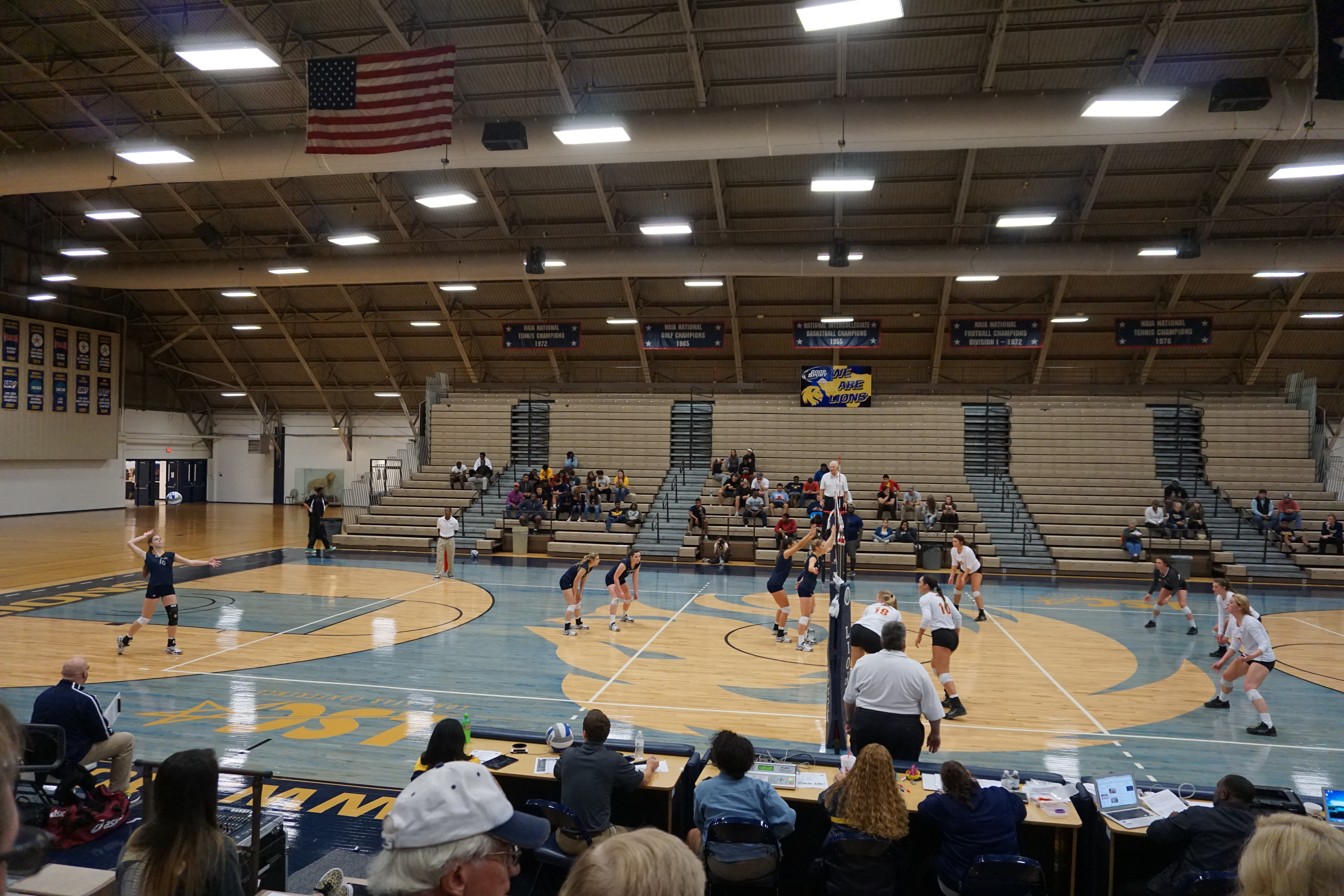
The 2015 team in action against the Midwestern State Mustangs

Women's volleyball has been a varsity sport at East Texas A&M (then East Texas State) since 1978, and the team has played in the LSC since it began sponsoring the sport in 1983. In 1980, the Lions finished the season as the National Association of Intercollegiate Athletics (NAIA) national runners-up. From its inception until 1982, the program competed in the NAIA under head coach Donna Tavener; that year, it began competing at the NCAA Division II level.

The Lions were one of the strongest teams in the LSC during the 1980s, never finishing below fourth place in the conference under the guidance of head coach Kathy Goodlett between 1983 and 1989, and winning the conference regular-season title in 1986 and 1987 as well as the LSC tournament in 1986. The team also reached the NCAA Division II tournament quarterfinals in 1987, and advanced to the second round of the national tournament in the two subsequent seasons, 1987 and 1988.

Since the end of Goodlett's coaching tenure in 1989, the A&M–Commerce women's volleyball program has failed to win a regular-season conference championship. From 1990 to 2022, the Lions have been coached by Terri Johnson (1990–95), Larry Blackwell (1996–2002), Gwen Weatherford (2003–07), Mark Pryor (2008–09), and Craig Case (2010–2022). Case would lead the Lions to a Lone Star Conference championship in 2018. Case also guided the Lions to three consecutive NCAA Tournament appearances in 2017, 2018, and 2019. On February 3, 2021, Case became the winningest coach in program history, earning his 186th victory.

During their first Division I season, the Lions endured their first losing season since 2014, going 11-23 overall and 6-12 in conference play. Despite this, the Lions still managed to qualify for the Southland Conference Tournament with a seventh place finish. There, they would defeat the New Orleans Privateers in the first round before falling to the McNeese State Cowgirls in the quarterfinal round.

After the season, Case stepped down after 13 seasons as the Lions' head coach on December 5, 2022. Joe Morales was hired as the program's eighth head coach on January 19, 2023.

In Morales' first season, the Lions endured another losing season, but still managed to qualify for the Southland Conference Tournament, clinching the final spot. They were eliminated in the first round by the Northwestern State Demons.

Morales' second season saw the Lions go 10-19 overall and 7-9 in conference play. They once again clinched the final spot in the Southland Conference Tournament, where they once again lost to Northwestern State in the first round.

In 2025, the Lions went 9-19 overall and 7-9 in conference play. They qualified for the Southland Conference Tournament for the fourth year in a row, but were eliminated in the opening round by the SFA Ladyjacks.

=== All-time record ===
Year	Head coach	Overall	Pct.	Conf.	Pct.	Place	Tourn.	Postseason
1978	Donna Tavener	23–22	.511	–	–	–	–	–
1979	Donna Tavener	11–18	.379	–	–	–	–	–
1980	Donna Tavener	26–16	.619	–	–	–	–	–
1981	Donna Tavener	20–18	.526	–	–	–	–	–
1982	Donna Tavener	28–11	.718	–	–	–	–	–
1983	Kathy Goodlett	34–12	.739	3–3	.500	3rd	–	–
1984	Kathy Goodlett	33–17	.660	8–2	.800	2nd	2nd	–
1985	Kathy Goodlett	25–25	.500	6–4	.600	4th	2nd	–
1986	Kathy Goodlett	22–2	.917	12–0	1.000	1st	1st	Quarterfinals
1987	Kathy Goodlett	31–6	.838	8–1	.889	1st	–	Second round
1988	Kathy Goodlett	23–10	.697	12–2	.857	2nd	–	Second round
1989	Kathy Goodlett	17–19	.472	10–6	.625	3rd	–	–
1990	Terri Johnson	12–16	.429	9–6	.600	4th	–	–
1991	Terri Johnson	8–22	.267	3–6	.333	6th	–	–
1992	Terri Johnson	18–17	.514	3–5	.375	5th	–	–
1993	Terri Johnson	15–21	.417	5–9	.357	7th	–	–
1994	Terri Johnson	21–12	.636	11–2	.846	2nd	2nd	–
1995	Terri Johnson	20–13	.606	10–6	.625	3rd	–	–
1996	Larry Blackwell	7–27	.206	5–13	.278	8th	–	–
1997	Larry Blackwell	17–16	.515	5–5	.500	4th (North)	–	–
1998	Larry Blackwell	16–19	.457	7–5	.583	4th (North)	–	–
1999	Larry Blackwell	13–20	.394	6–6	.500	4th (North)	–	–
2000	Larry Blackwell	24–13	.649	7–3	.700	3rd (North)	–	–
2001	Larry Blackwell	21–13	.618	7–3	.700	3rd (North)	–	–
2002	Larry Blackwell	24–13	.649	7–3	.700	2nd (North)	–	–
2003	Gwen Weatherford	15–16	.484	4–7	.364	4th (North)	–	–
2004	Gwen Weatherford	7–23	.233	3–7	.300	T4th (North)	–	–
2005	Gwen Weatherford	10–19	.345	2–8	.200	6th (North)	–	–
2006	Gwen Weatherford	11–19	.367	4–8	.333	6th (North)	–	–
2007	Gwen Weatherford	9–19	.321	3–9	.250	11th	–	–
2008	Mark Pryor	15–12	.556	6–7	.462	7th	T5th	–
2009	Mark Pryor	26–9	.743	9–4	.692	4th	T3rd	–
2010	Craig Case	14–15	.483	4–10	.286	T10th	–	–
2011	Craig Case	11–17	.393	6–14	.300	T9th	–	–
2012	Craig Case	20–11	.645	11–9	.550	5th	T5th	–
2013	Craig Case	23–9	.719	9–7	.563	4th	T3rd	–
2014	Craig Case	7–23	.233	4–12	.250	8th	T5th	–
2015	Craig Case	15–14	.517	7–9	.438	6th	6th	–
2016	Craig Case	19-13	.594	13-7	.650	5th	Quarterfinals	–
2017	Craig Case	21-12	.636	15-5	.750	2nd	Semifinals	Regional quarterfinals
2018	Craig Case	30-6	.833	17-3	.850	2nd	Champions	Regional finalist
2019	Craig Case	24-7	.774	16-2	.889	T1st	Quarterfinals	Regional quarterfinals
2020	Craig Case	7-7	.500	6-6	.500	2nd	Quarterfinals	–
2021	Craig Case	14-10	.583	12-5	.706	5th	First round	–
2022	Craig Case	11-23	.324	6-12	.333	7th	Quarterfinals	–
2023	Joe Morales	9-23	.281	5-13	.278	8th	First Round	–
2024	Joe Morales	10-19	.345	7-9	.438	8th	First Round	–
2025	Joe Morales	9-19	.321	7-9	.438	8th	Quarterfinals	–

Year-by-year results through the end of the 2025 season

== Arena ==
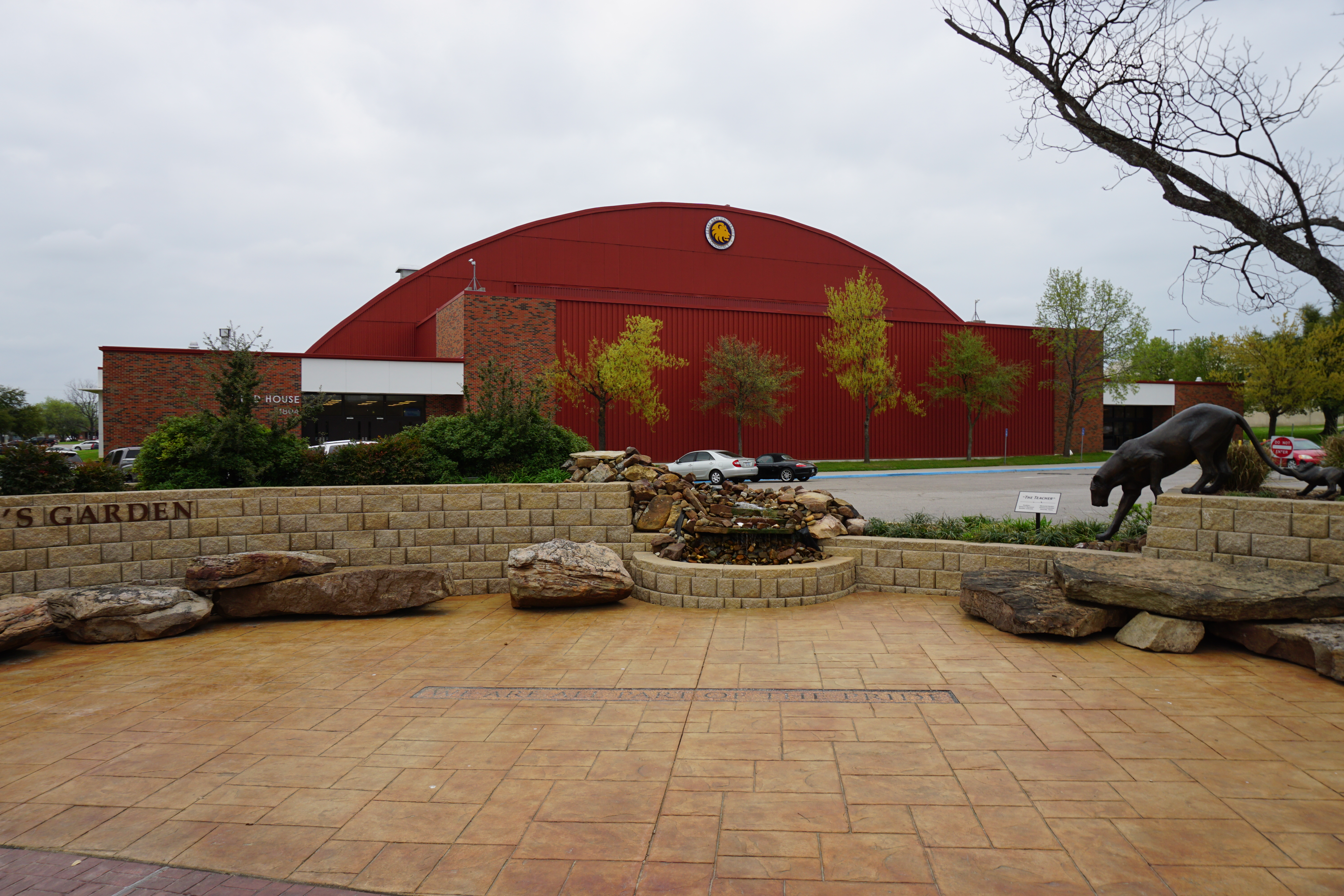
The Field House as it appeared in 2015

The Lions women's volleyball program has played at the University Field House since the inception of the program in 1978, although the arena itself was built in 1950 and dedicated in January 1951 as the home of the school's men's basketball program. The Field House has a capacity of 3,055 for both volleyball and basketball contests. The building as a whole measures a total of 69,000 square feet (6,400 m^{2}), enabling it to host the offices of numerous A&M–Commerce sports (including cross country, track and field, soccer, and softball in addition to basketball and volleyball) and university departments (the Athletic Department, Athletic Training, Health and Human Performance, and the James Thrower Academic Center). The arena has also been the host to numerous athletic camps and concerts.

Designed by George Dahl, the Field House was intended to resemble an airplane hangar, with an arched roof topping out at 58 feet (18 m) that is supported by steel beams. In 1949, school president James Gee announced plans for the building's construction along with Memorial Stadium at a combined cost of $325,000. Since its opening in 1951, the Field House has been renovated on numerous occasions: in 1969 (adding classrooms, offices, and dressing rooms), 1991 (replacing bleachers, hardwood playing surface, the HVAC system, and scoreboards), and 2014 (again replacing the playing surface).
