= The Field House (East Texas A&M) =

Arena in Commerce, Texas

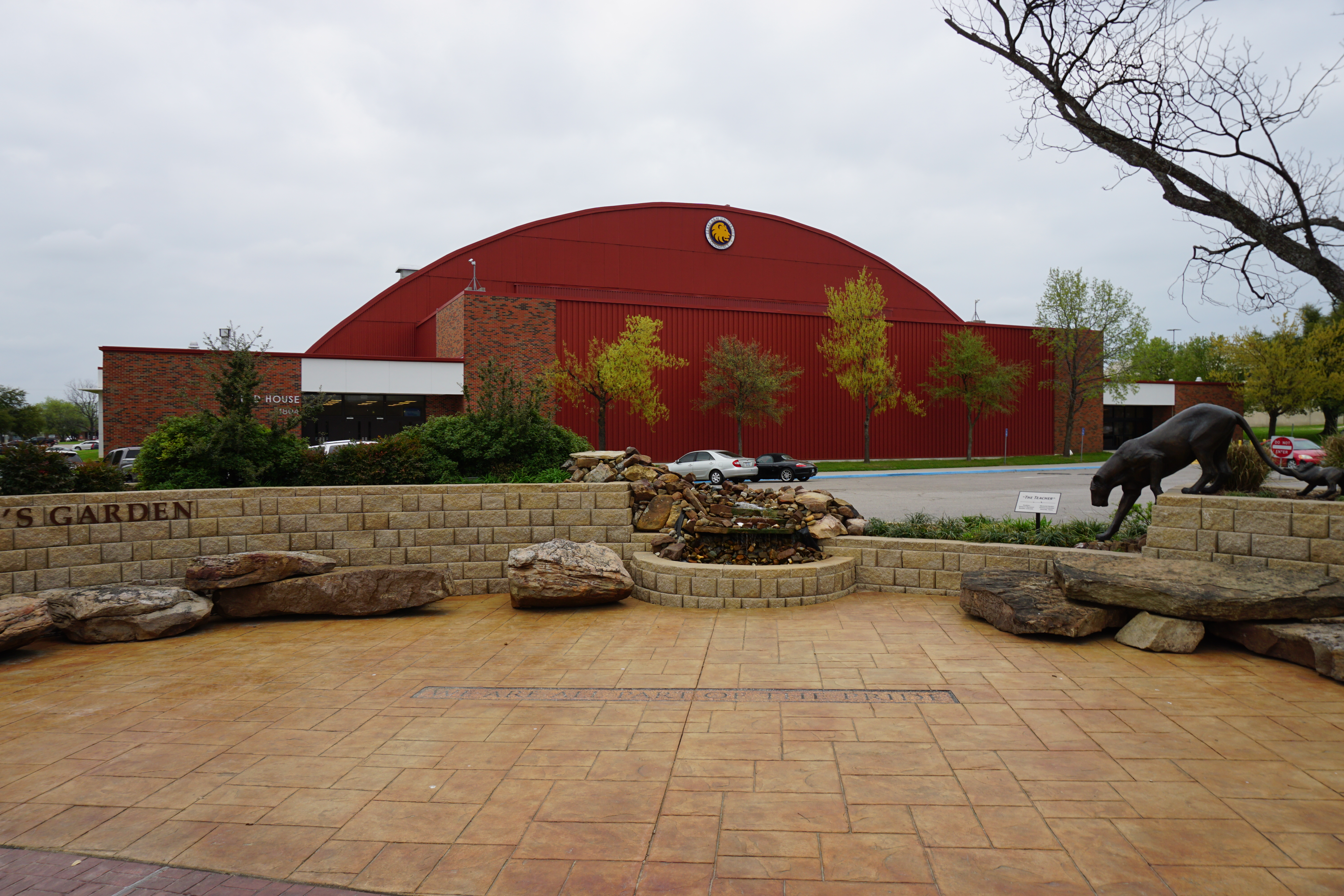
- The Field House in March 2015
- Interactive map of The Field House
- Location: 2600 South Neal Street, Commerce, Texas, 75428 U.S.
- Coordinates: 33.245337°N 95.907619°W
- Owner: East Texas A&M University
- Operator: East Texas A&M University
- Capacity: 3,055
- Surface: Hardwood
- Record attendance: 2,446

Construction
- Groundbreaking: 1949
- Opened: September 1, 1950
- Renovated: 1969, 1991, 2009
- Expanded: 1969
- Cost: $325,000 (1950) (Costs would be roughly $4.25 million in 2010)
- Architect: George L. Dahl

Tenants
- East Texas A&M Lions (NCAA); Men's basketball (1950–present); Women's basketball (1971–present); Women's volleyball (1978–present)

The Field House or University Field House is a 3,055-seat multi-purpose arena on the campus of East Texas A&M University in Commerce, Texas. It was built in 1950 when the school was known as East Texas State Teachers College. It is the home of the East Texas A&M Lions men's and women's basketball teams, as well as home to Lions volleyball. The Field House is also used as the location for the university's commencement exercises.

== History ==
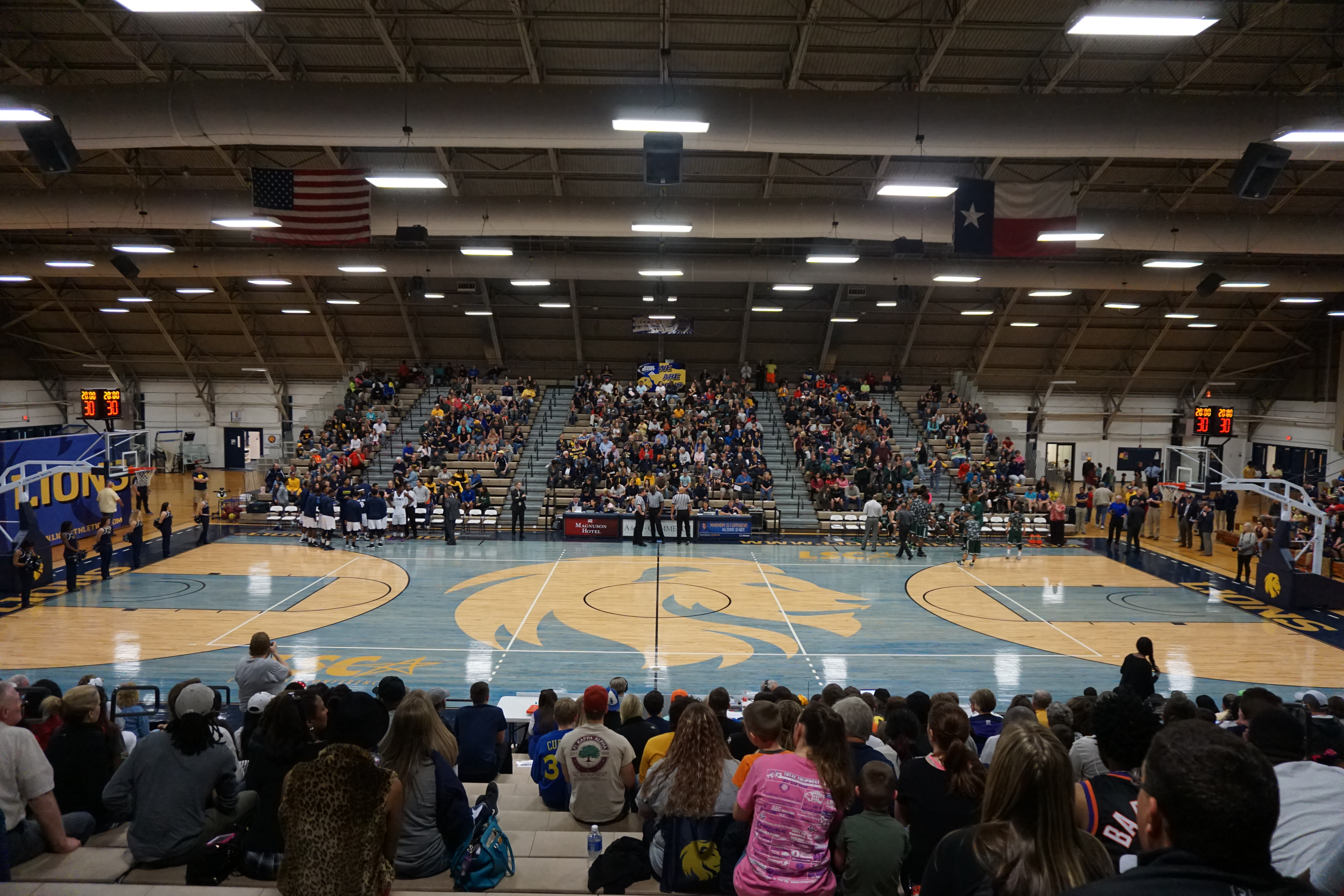
The Field House before a basketball game against the Eastern New Mexico Greyhounds in 2016

In the fall of 1949, East Texas State president James Gee first announced the construction of the Field House and Memorial Stadium. At a cost of $325,000, the crews of George L. Dahl were able to complete the project in just over a year. Since the original structure was built, there was a renovation in 1969 that included a two-story addition for classrooms and offices, a dressing room and a storage area. A third renovation came in 1991 to include the installation of new bleachers, scoreboards, heating and ventilation and a refurbishment of the one-acre maple hardwood floor. In 2009, the Field House received its most modern renovations with a brand new playing floor, digital scoreboards, new ventilation and heating, more efficient lighting, renovations to offices and classrooms, new basketball goals with digital shot-clocks.

=== Men's basketball attendance ===
Rk.	Date	Opponent	Attendance	Result
Highest attendance
1	November 29, 2018	Angelo State	2,446	W 81–72
2	January 21, 2017	West Texas A&M	2,368	W 104–103 (2 OT)
3	December 7, 2017	Eastern New Mexico	2,213	W 85–78
4	February 20, 2016	Eastern New Mexico	2,153	W 81–73
5	December 6, 2021	Harding	2,021	W 94–83

Attendance records available 2011–present

== Building features and structure ==
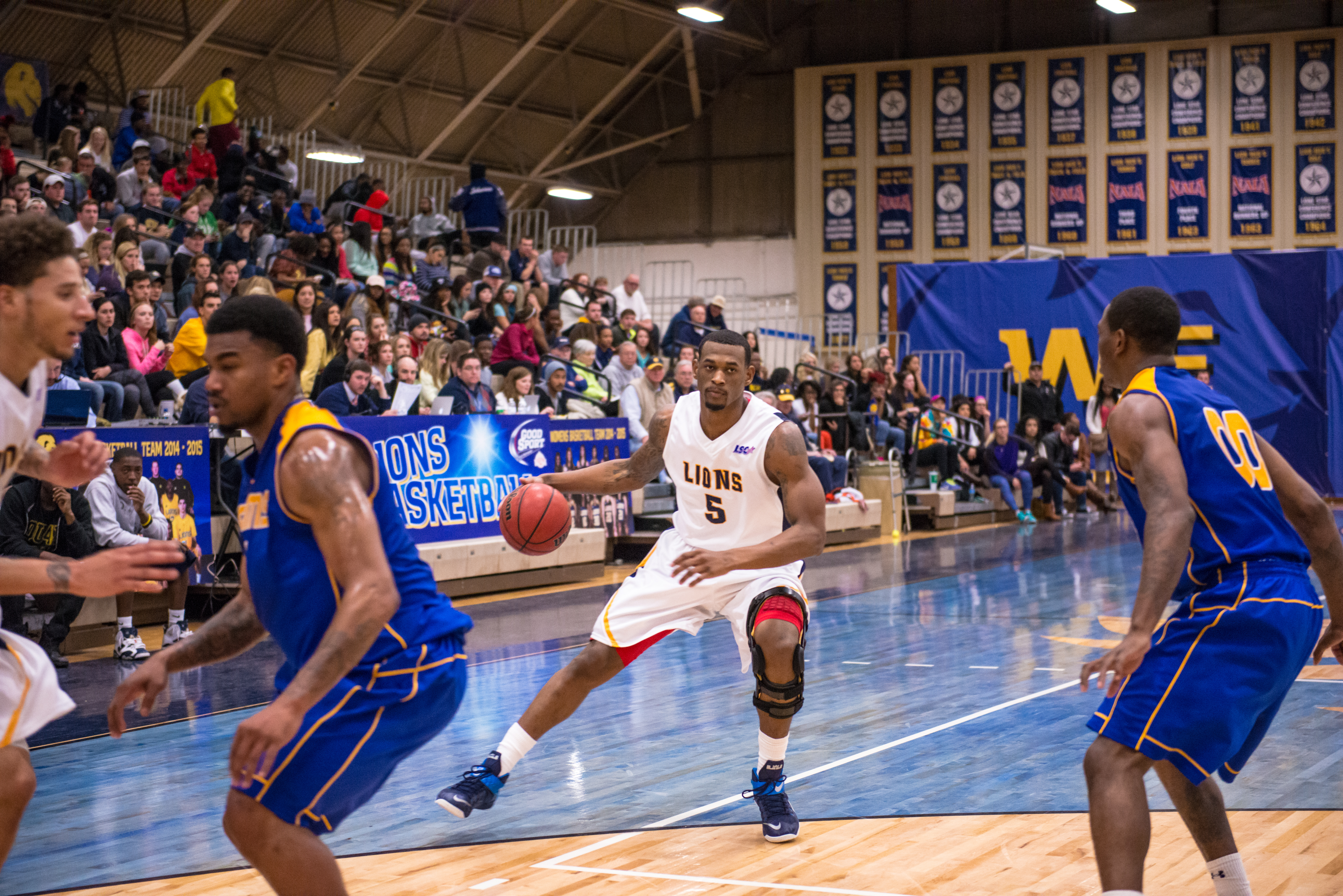
A basketball game between the Lions and the Angelo State Rams at the Field House in 2015

The Field House covers 69,000 square feet and will seat 3,055 people for either a volleyball or basketball contest. The facility is also the host to the University's Athletic Administration staff, the Sports Medicine Department and the Health and Human Performance Department; in addition to the offices for the basketball, cross country and track and field, golf, soccer, softball and volleyball teams.

The Field House is shaped like an airplane hangar and has space for three basketball courts crossways. The floor allows three games to be played at the same time under one roof. The one lengthwise court is reserved for East Texas A&M basketball and volleyball games. With an arched roof, 58 feet from the ground at the highest point, is supported on steel beams that are stationed at one end.

== Usage ==
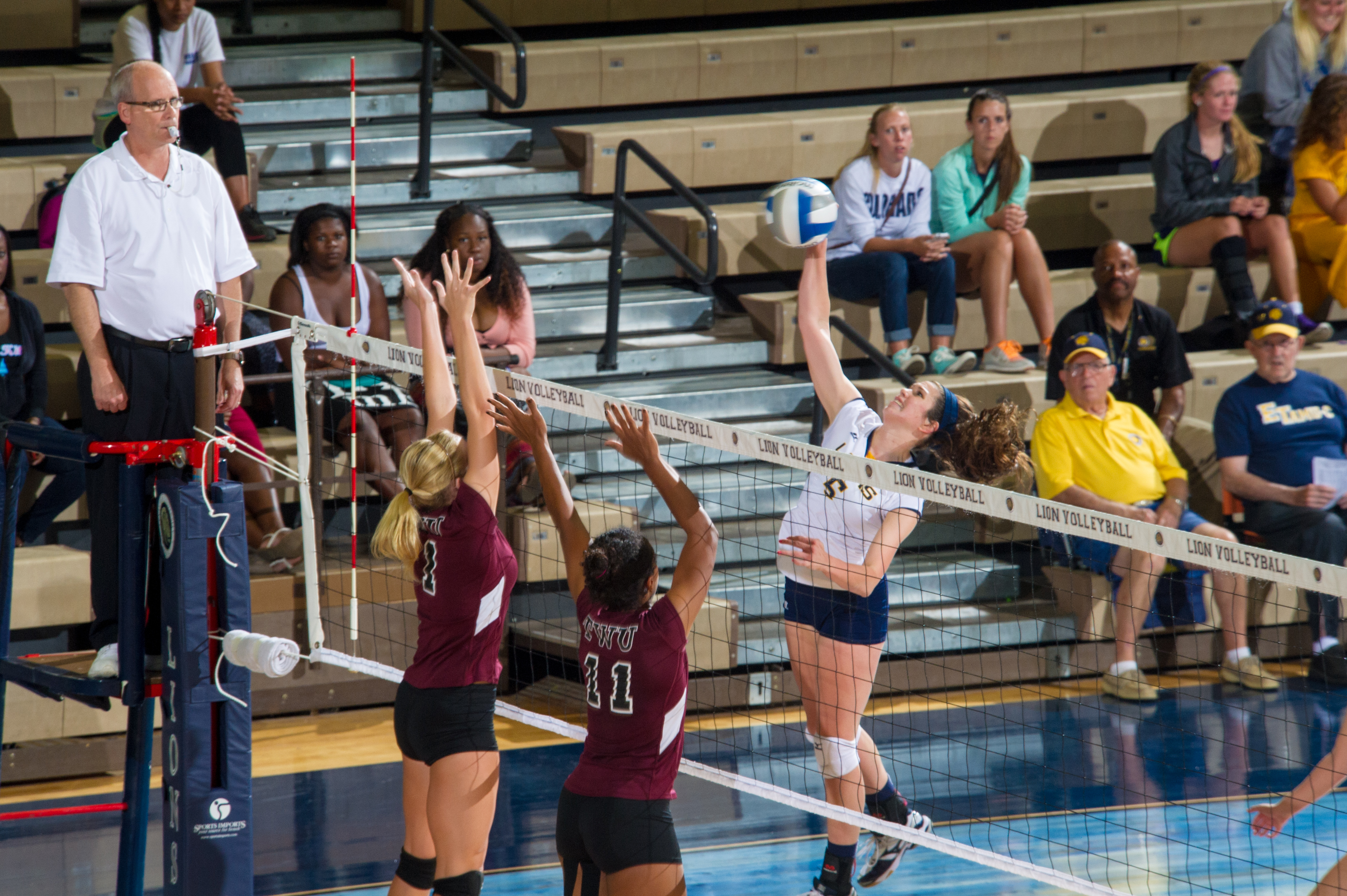
A volleyball match at the Field House between the Lions and TWU Pioneers in 2014

In addition to being used for East Texas A&M basketball and volleyball, the ETA&M intrascholastic intramural sports basketball championships for both men and women are played at the Field House.

== See also ==
- List of NCAA Division I basketball arenas
