= Lakeport, Texas =

- City
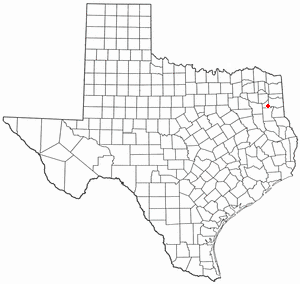
- Location of Lakeport, Texas

- Coordinates: 32°24′18″N 94°42′37″W
- Country: United States
- State: Texas
- County: Gregg

Area
  - Total: 1.59 sq mi (4.12 km^{2})
  - Land: 1.59 sq mi (4.12 km^{2})
  - Water: 0 sq mi (0.00 km^{2})
- Elevation: 305 ft (93 m)

Population (2020)
  - Total: 976
  - Density: 614/sq mi (237/km^{2})
- Time zone: UTC-6 (Central (CST))
  - Summer (DST): UTC-5 (CDT)
- ZIP code: 75603
- Area codes: 903, 430
- FIPS code: 48-40696
- GNIS feature ID: 2411610
- Website: City of Lakeport

Lakeport is a city in Gregg County, Texas, United States. The population was 974 at the 2010 census, up from 861 at the 2000 census; in 2020, its population was 976.

== Geography ==
Lakeport is located in southeastern Gregg County. Texas State Highway 149 (Estes Parkway) forms the northeastern border of the city, and leads north 7 miles (11 km) to Longview and southeast 13 miles (21 km) to Tatum. Texas State Highway 322 passes through the west side of Lakeport, starting at Highway 149 and leading south 20 miles (32 km) to Henderson. The city is bordered to the south by East Texas Regional Airport.

According to the United States Census Bureau, Lakeport has a total area of 1.6 square miles (4.1 km^{2}), all land. The Sabine River forms part of the northwestern border of the city.

== Demographics ==
Historical population
Census	Pop.	Note	%±
1970	411		—
1980	835		103.2%
1990	710		−15.0%
2000	861		21.3%
2010	974		13.1%
2020	976		0.2%
U.S. Decennial Census

=== Racial and ethnic composition ===
Lakeport city, Texas – Racial and ethnic composition Note: the US Census treats Hispanic/Latino as an ethnic category. This table excludes Latinos from the racial categories and assigns them to a separate category. Hispanics/Latinos may be of any race.
Race / Ethnicity (NH = Non-Hispanic)	Pop 2000	Pop 2010	Pop 2020	% 2000	% 2010	% 2020
White alone (NH)	389	295	227	45.18%	30.29%	23.26%
Black or African American alone (NH)	413	515	491	47.97%	52.87%	50.31%
Native American or Alaska Native alone (NH)	5	4	4	0.58%	0.41%	0.41%
Asian alone (NH)	2	8	17	0.23%	0.82%	1.74%
Native Hawaiian or Pacific Islander alone (NH)	0	0	0	0.00%	0.00%	0.00%
Other race alone (NH)	0	2	0	0.00%	0.21%	0.00%
Mixed race or Multiracial (NH)	4	15	27	0.46%	1.54%	2.77%
Hispanic or Latino (any race)	48	135	210	5.57%	13.86%	21.52%
Total	861	974	976	100.00%	100.00%	100.00%

=== 2020 census ===
As of the 2020 census, Lakeport had a population of 976, with 379 households and 326 families residing in the city. The median age was 40.2 years, with 25.0% of residents under the age of 18 and 15.0% of residents 65 years of age or older. For every 100 females there were 96.8 males, and for every 100 females age 18 and over there were 94.2 males age 18 and over.

97.3% of residents lived in urban areas, while 2.7% lived in rural areas.

There were 379 households in Lakeport, of which 35.6% had children under the age of 18 living in them. Of all households, 44.3% were married-couple households, 20.3% were households with a male householder and no spouse or partner present, and 29.8% were households with a female householder and no spouse or partner present. About 22.4% of all households were made up of individuals and 8.5% had someone living alone who was 65 years of age or older.

There were 412 housing units, of which 8.0% were vacant. The homeowner vacancy rate was 2.8% and the rental vacancy rate was 10.4%.

Racial composition as of the 2020 census
Race	Number	Percent
White	255	26.1%
Black or African American	495	50.7%
American Indian and Alaska Native	4	0.4%
Asian	17	1.7%
Native Hawaiian and Other Pacific Islander	0	0.0%
Some other race	129	13.2%
Two or more races	76	7.8%
Hispanic or Latino (of any race)	210	21.5%

In 2020, the median household income grew to $61,500 with a mean household income of $70,444.

=== 2000 census ===
According to the census of 2000, there were 861 people, 352 households, and 255 families residing in the city. The population density was 555.0 inhabitants per square mile (214.3/km^{2}). There were 373 housing units at an average density of 240.5 per square mile (92.9/km^{2}). The racial makeup of the city was 47.27% White, 47.97% African American, 0.58% Native American, 0.23% Asian, 3.37% from other races, and 0.58% from two or more races. Hispanic or Latino of any race were 5.57% of the population.

In 2000, the median income for a household in the city was $33,125, and the median income for a family was $45,000. Males had a median income of $35,329 versus $22,250 for females. The per capita income for the city was $18,646. About 9.8% of families and 11.0% of the population were below the poverty line, including 8.9% of those under age 18 and 18.3% of those age 65 or over.

== Transportation ==
The East Texas Regional Airport is in an unincorporated area, adjacent to Lakeport, at the city's southern boundary.

== Education ==
The Longview Independent School District is the relevant school district. Longview High School is the comprehensive high school.

The service area of Kilgore College includes Longview ISD.
