= Great Texas Balloon Race =

Coordinates: 32.492°N 94.739°W

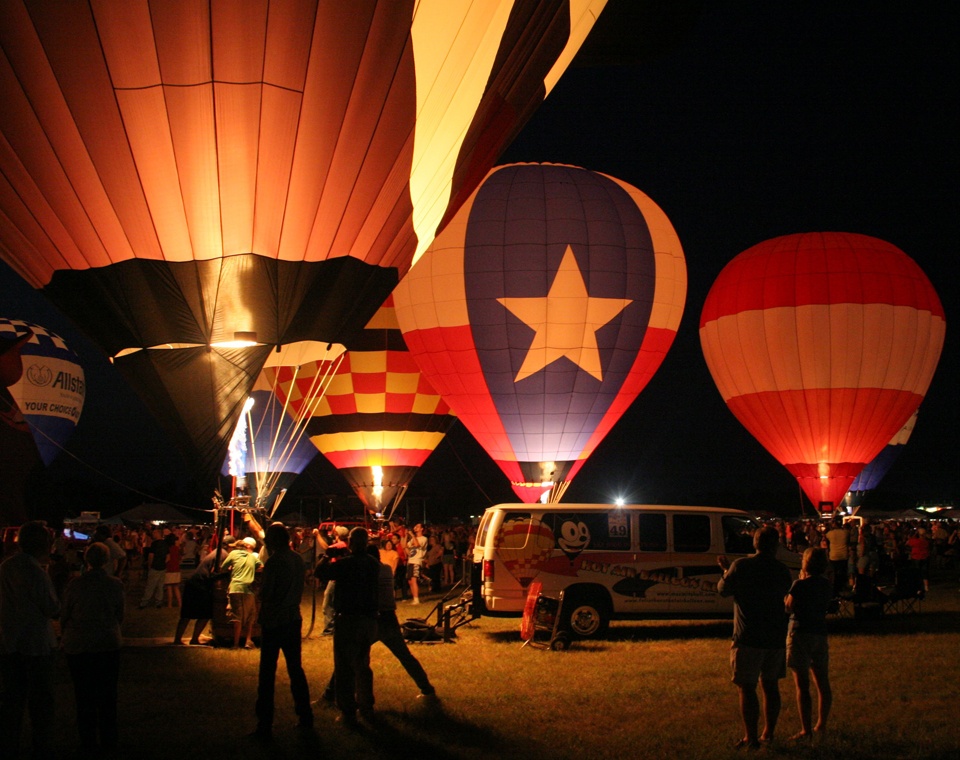
- The Balloon Glow was first performed at the Great Texas Balloon Race
- Genre: Hot air balloon festival
- Dates: July (Annually)
- Frequency: Annual
- Location: Near Longview, Texas United States
- Years active: 48
- Participants: Varies (up to 50 hot-air balloons)
- Attendance: Approx. 100,000+
- Website: Official Website

The Great Texas Balloon Race is an annual hot air balloon festival held in the vicinity of Longview, Texas, specifically near the East Texas Regional Airport (also known as Gregg County Airport). Established in 1978, it is "The longest running hot-air balloon event in Texas," attracting a crowd of over 100,000 spectators annually.

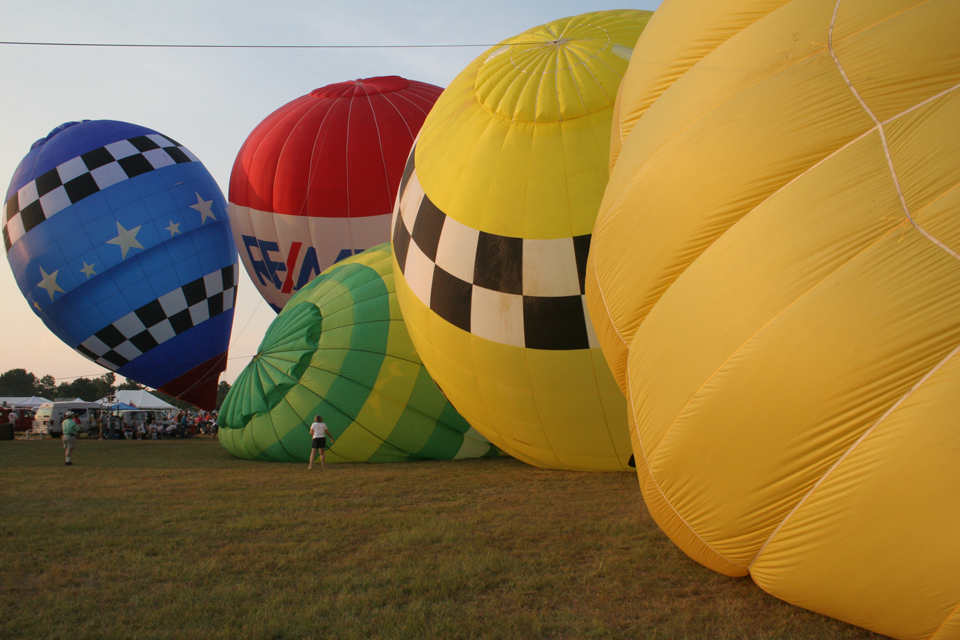
Balloons Inflate at the Great Texas Balloon Race

== History ==
The Great Texas Balloon Race was founded in 1978, making it a Texas tradition. It originally started as a small regional event, but over the years, it has grown to become one of the largest and most prestigious balloon festivals in the United States.

Each year, hot-air balloon pilots from around the world converge on the East Texas region for this event. The race itself involves balloon pilots competing in various challenges, including the famous "Hare and Hound" competition, where one balloon serves as the target and others try to land their sandbags closest to it.

The event is not just about the race, but also features a Balloon Glow in the evening before the race. During the Balloon Glow, hot air balloons are illuminated by their burners as they remain tethered to the ground, creating a colorful and awe-inspiring spectacle.

== Activities ==
Aside from the main race, the Great Texas Balloon Race offers a variety of entertainment for all ages. There is live music, food and drink, family-friendly activities, and arts and crafts vendors. One of the highlights of the festival is the "Balloon Glow" where the vibrant colors of the balloons are showcased in the evening.

The event also includes a concert series and opportunities for spectators to interact with balloon pilots, providing a unique and educational experience for families and visitors of all ages.

== Current Status ==
Today, the Great Texas Balloon Race remains a cornerstone of Texas summer festivities, with continuous growth in both attendance and participants each year. The event’s strategic location near Longview and Kilgore allows for easy access, attracting both locals and visitors from across the United States.

== COVID-19 Impact ==
The 2020 edition of the Great Texas Balloon Race was canceled due to the COVID-19 pandemic. However, the event successfully resumed in 2021, attracting ballooning enthusiasts and spectators back to East Texas.
