= St Aubyn Centre =

Psychiatric hospital in Colchester, Essex, England

Coordinates: 51.9181°N 0.8926°E

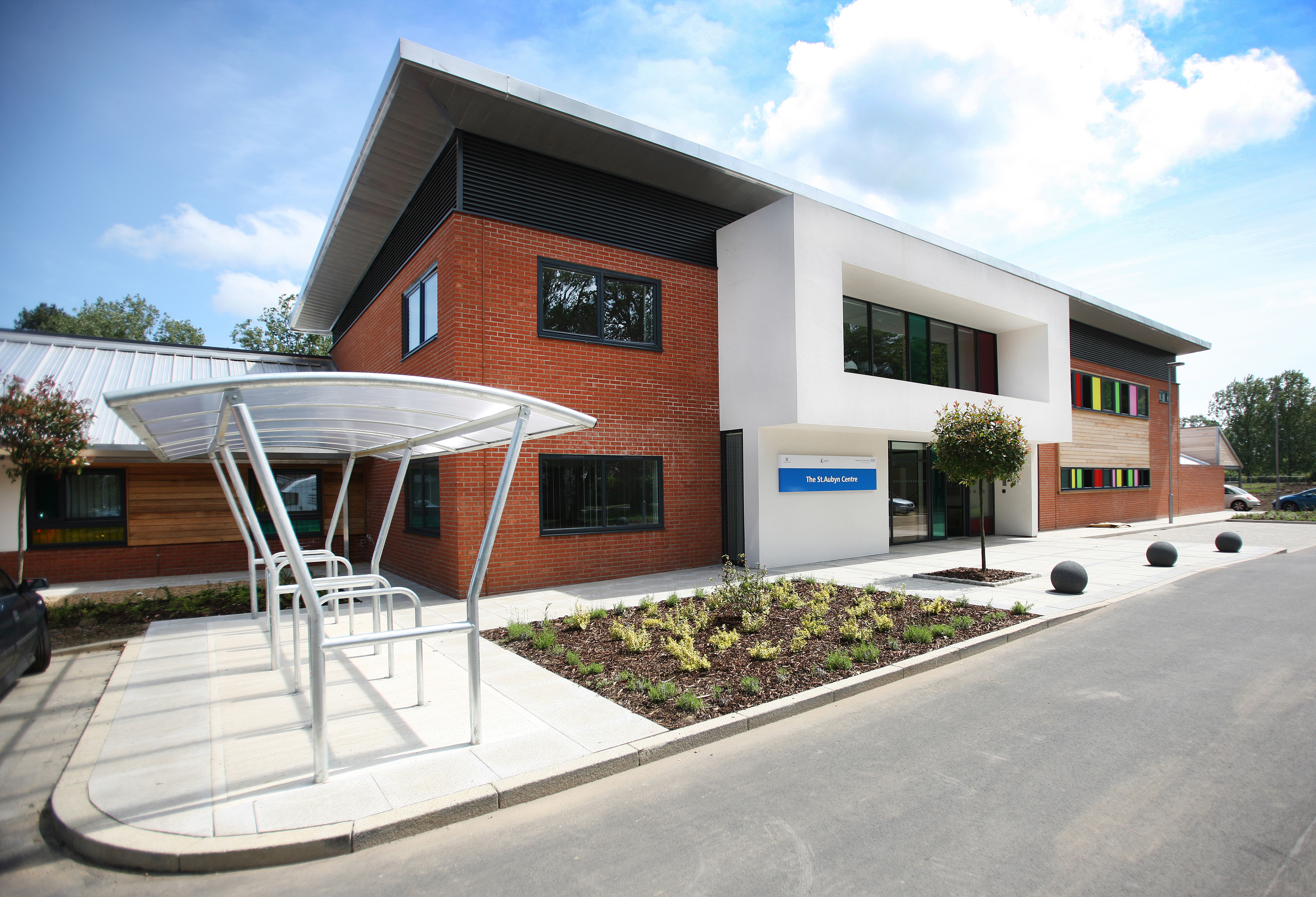
St Aubyn Centre

The St Aubyn Centre is a mental health facility at Stuart House, 2 Boxted Road, Mile End, Colchester, Essex. It has two wards: (i) Longview Ward which is a General Adolescent unit which provides care and treatment for young people with mental health difficulties between the ages of 13 and 18 and (ii) Larkwood Ward which is a Psychiatric Intensive Care Unit (PICU) caring for children of the same age group. Larkwood is the only Psychiatric Intensive Care Unit in the NHS East of England region for young people.

== See also ==
- Healthcare in Essex
- List of hospitals in England
