= Vue =

Vue or VUE may refer to:

== Places ==
- Vue, Loire-Atlantique, a commune in France
- The Vue, a skyscraper in Charlotte, North Carolina

== Arts, entertainment and media ==
- Vue (band), a rock and roll band from San Francisco, California
- Vue International, a cinema company in the United Kingdom
- Vue Weekly, an alternative newspaper in Edmonton, Canada
- PlayStation Vue, a former American streaming service from Sony

=== Television stations ===
- KVUE, the ABC TV affiliate for Austin, Texas, US
- WVUE (Wilmington, Delaware), a defunct TV station in Wilmington, Delaware, US
- WVUE-DT, the Fox TV affiliate for New Orleans, Louisiana, US

== Brands and enterprises ==
- Pearson VUE, an electronic testing company
- Saturn Vue, a sport utility vehicle
- Vue International, a multinational cinema holding company based in the UK
- Vue Pack, single-serve coffee system by Keurig
- Vivendi Universal Entertainment, a former entertainment company owned by Vivendi Universal

== Science and technology ==
- Villitis of unknown etiology, a placental injury

=== Software ===
- E-on Vue, 3D landscape generation software from e-on software
- Visual Understanding Environment, a concept mapping tool
- Visual User Environment, Hewlett-Packard's graphical interface for the X Window System
- Vue (programming language), used with ProbeVue
- Vue.js, open-source reactive web application framework

== Other uses ==
- Vue, a clan name of the Hmong people related to the name Wu
