= East Texas Regional Airport =

Airport in Texas, US

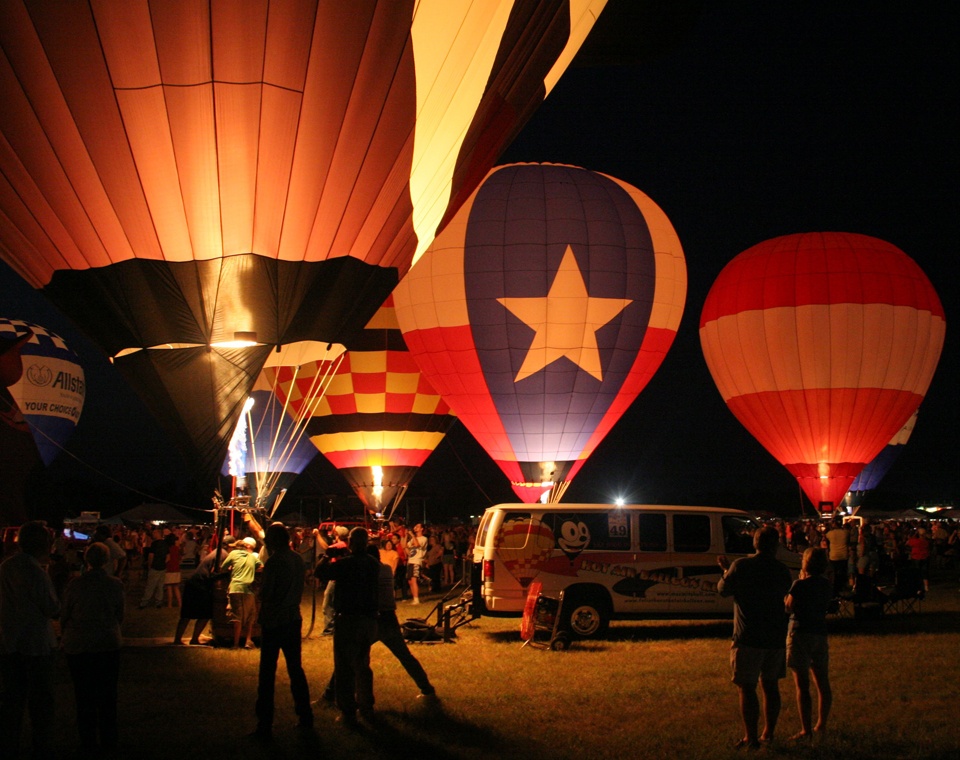
- The Balloon Glow was first performed at the Great Texas Balloon Race
- IATA: GGG; ICAO: KGGG; FAA LID: GGG

Summary
- Airport type: Public
- Owner: Gregg County
- Serves: Kilgore, Texas, Longview, Texas, and the greater East Texas region
- Location: Lakeport, Texas
- Elevation AMSL: 365 ft (111 m)
- Coordinates: 32°23′02″N 094°42′41″W
- Website: Official website

Map
- Location within Texas Location within the United States

Runways
Direction	Length		Surface
Direction	ft	m	Surface
13/31	10,000	3,048	Asphalt
18/36	6,110	1,862	Asphalt

Statistics (2023)
- Aircraft operations (year ending 4/30/2023): 85,989
- Based aircraft: 112
- Source: Federal Aviation Administration

East Texas Regional Airport (IATA: GGG, ICAO: KGGG, FAA LID: GGG) is an airport located in an unincorporated area, in Gregg County, Texas, United States. The airport is just south of the city of Lakeport, and is 9 mi (7.8 nmi; 14 km) south of Longview. Its IATA identifier GGG comes from its prior name, Gregg County Airport. The airport is used for general aviation and military training; it has scheduled flights to Dallas/Fort Worth on American Airlines/American Eagle.

Federal Aviation Administration records say the airport had 24,835 passenger boardings (enplanements) in calendar year 2008, 24,944 in 2009 and 21,830 in 2010. The National Plan of Integrated Airport Systems for 2011–2015 categorized it as a primary commercial service airport (more than 10,000 enplanements per year).

East Texas Regional is home to LeTourneau University's School of Aeronautical Science. LeTourneau constitutes a very large portion of the airport's traffic and has a fleet of airplanes ranging from Cessna 172s to Citabrias and Piper PA-44 Seminoles. Most LeTourneau aircraft have tail numbers ending in L or LU. All use the call sign "Jacket" (three letter- JKA).

Each summer the airport hosts the Great Texas Balloon Race, a volunteer-run weekend event held annually since 1980.

== History ==
Construction of the Gregg County Airport and terminal was completed and the airport opened on 15 July 1947. Once open, Mid-Continent and Delta Air Lines serviced the airport with commercial flights. Many improvements happened over the years, including runway lights, approach lights, and an instrument landing system. Big changes came in 1970, when the 10,000 ft (3,000 m) paved runway 13/31 was completed, and in 1976 when a new air traffic control tower was built. In 2002, the airport was renamed the East Texas Regional Airport. In 2007 the airport was awarded a $6.5 million Airport Improvement Program grant to accomplish major updates to the facility. Included among the projects were the resurfacing of Runway 13/31, as well as the relocation of the ILS glideslope and MALSR due to the creation of an 800' displaced threshold on Runway 13 to comply with FAA runway safety area standards. Former taxiway H (at the intersection of 18/36 and 13/31) was demolished after being identified as a potential hot spot for runway incursions. The improvements were completed in 2009.

On 8 October 1992, the airport was the first of two stops for Ferry Flight 58 of Space Shuttle Atlantis between the Kennedy Space Center and Palmdale, California, where Atlantis was sent for orbiter maintenance.

== Facilities ==
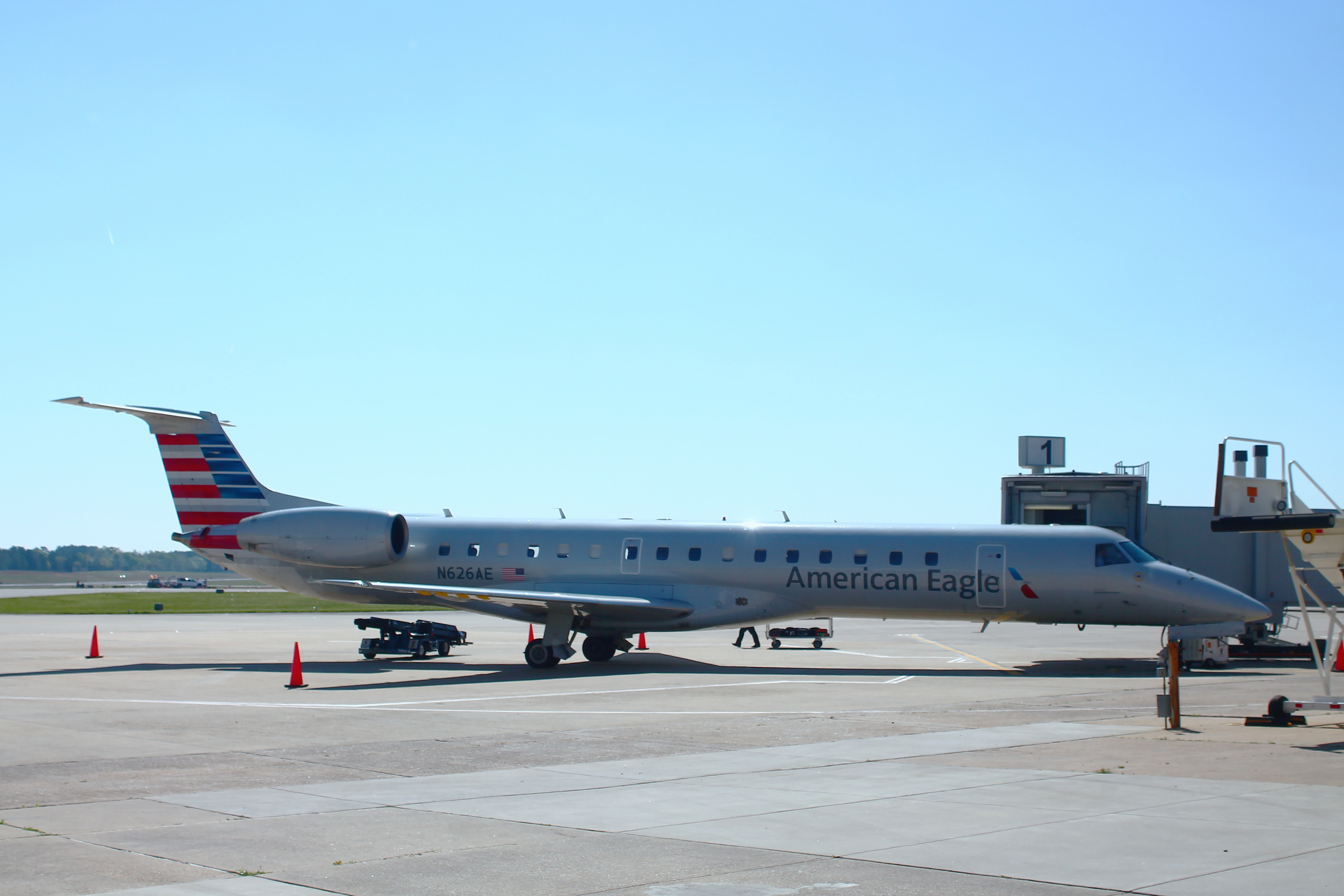
American Eagle

East Texas Regional Airport covers 1,300 acres (530 ha; 5.3 km^{2}) at an elevation of 365 ft (111 m). It has two asphalt runways:

- 13/31 is 10,000 by 150 ft (3,048 by 46 m)
- 18/36 is 6,110 by 150 ft (1,862 by 46 m)

In the year ending April 30, 2023, the airport had 85,989 aircraft operations, average 235 per day: 74% general aviation, 10% military, 15% air taxi, and <1% airline. 112 aircraft were then based at this airport: 50 single-engine, 29 multi-engine, 32 jet, and 1 helicopter.

Two fixed-base operators (FBOs) are on the field: Stebbins Aviation and Jet Center.

== Airline and destination ==
Airlines	Destinations
American Eagle	Dallas/Fort Worth

Destination map
Destination from East Texas Regional Airport

== See also ==
- List of airports in Texas
- Transportation in Texas
