= Longview Independent School District =

School district in Texas, United States

Longview Independent School District is a public 5A independent school district (ISD) based in Longview, Texas, United States.

In addition to serving most of Longview, the ISD serves the city of Lakeport, most of Easton, a portion of Lake Cherokee, a very small portion of East Mountain, and rural areas in eastern Gregg County.

== History ==
The Longview ISD was under a desegregation order from the federal judiciary beginning in 1970, when a judge mandated racial integration by closing some majority Black schools and other changes intended to help African-American students. The order lasted until June 2018, when a judge released it from the order. The LISD board passed measures to keep desegregation programs in place that year.

== Schools ==
- Longview High School (grades 9-12)
- Forest Park Magnet School of Global Studies (grades 6-8) - 1994-96 National Blue Ribbon School
- Foster Middle School (grades 6-8)
- Judson Middle School (grades 6-8)
- LISD Montessori Learning Academy (grades 6-8)
- Bramlette Elementary School (prekindergarten-grade 5)
- J.L. Everhart Magnet Academy of Cultural Studies (prekindergarten-grade 3)
- G.K. Foster Montessori Magnet School (prekindergarten-kindergarten)
- Hudson PEP Elementary School (grades 1-5) - 2003 National Blue Ribbon School
- Johnston-McQueen Elementary School (prekindergarten-grade 5)
- McClure Magnet School of International Studies (grades 4-5)
- Clarence W. Bailey Elementary School (prekindergarten-grade 5)
- Ned E. Williams Elementary (prekindergarten-grade 5)
- Ware Elementary School (prekindergarten-grade 5)
- LEAD Academy (alternative, grades 9-12)
- Benny J. Dade Center (alternative, grades 5-12)
