= Longview High School =

Public school in Longview, Texas, US

Coordinates: 32.5423°N 94.74355°W

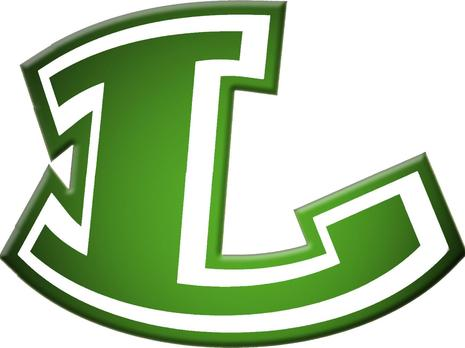

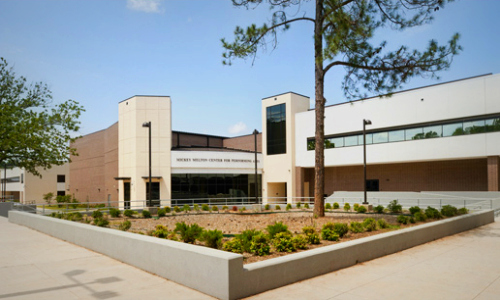

Location
- 201 East Tomlinson Parkway; Longview, Texas 75605-3268; United States

Information
- School type: Public high school
- Motto: Believe in Excellence
- Established: 1874
- School district: Longview Independent School District
- Principal: Shameika Allen
- Teaching staff: 164.33 (FTE)
- Grades: 9–12
- Enrollment: 2,272 (2024–2025)
- Student to teacher ratio: 13.83
- Colors: Green & White
- Athletics conference: UIL Class 6A
- Mascot: Lobos/Lady Lobos
- Rival: Lufkin High School
- Newspaper: The Long-View
- Yearbook: The Lobo
- Website: lhs.lisd.org

Longview High School (colloquially known as LHS) is a public high school located in the city of Longview, Texas, in Gregg County, United States and classified as a 6A school by the UIL. It is a part of the Longview Independent School District located in eastern Gregg County. The school was founded in 1874 as the Longview Male and Female Institute, and the first permanent structure was established in 1885. In 2017, the school earned 7-out-of-7 distinctions from the Texas Education Agency.

In addition to including most of Longview, the district serves the city of Lakeport, most of Easton, a portion of Lake Cherokee, a very small portion of East Mountain, and rural areas in eastern Gregg County.

== Athletics ==
The athletic mascot is the Lobos (Spanish for "Wolves"). The school competes in baseball, basketball, cross country, football, golf, powerlifting, soccer, softball, swimming and diving, tennis, track and field, and volleyball.

=== State Titles ===
- Boys Basketball
  - 1992(5A)
- Girls Basketball
  - 1984(5A)
- Football
  - 1937(All)
  - 2018(6A/D2)
- Tennis
  - 1990(5A Boys Singles)

== Notable alumni ==
- Willie Andrews, former NFL safety for the New England Patriots
- Chris Davis, MLB All-Star first baseman for Texas Rangers and Baltimore Orioles
- Travin Howard, NFL linebacker for the Los Angeles Rams
- Chris Ivory, former NFL running back for the Jacksonville Jaguars, New York Jets, New Orleans Saints and Buffalo Bills
- Malcolm Kelly, former NFL wide receiver for the Washington Redskins
- Haynes King, college football quarterback
- Matthew McConaughey, Academy Award-winning film actor
- Roughriders
- Broderick Washington Jr. - Baltimore Ravens defensive tackle
- Rickey Watts - former NFL wide receiver for the Chicago Bears
- David Wesley - former NBA guard
- Trent Williams - NFL offensive tackle for the San Francisco 49ers
