= History of Texas A&M University–Commerce (1996–present) =

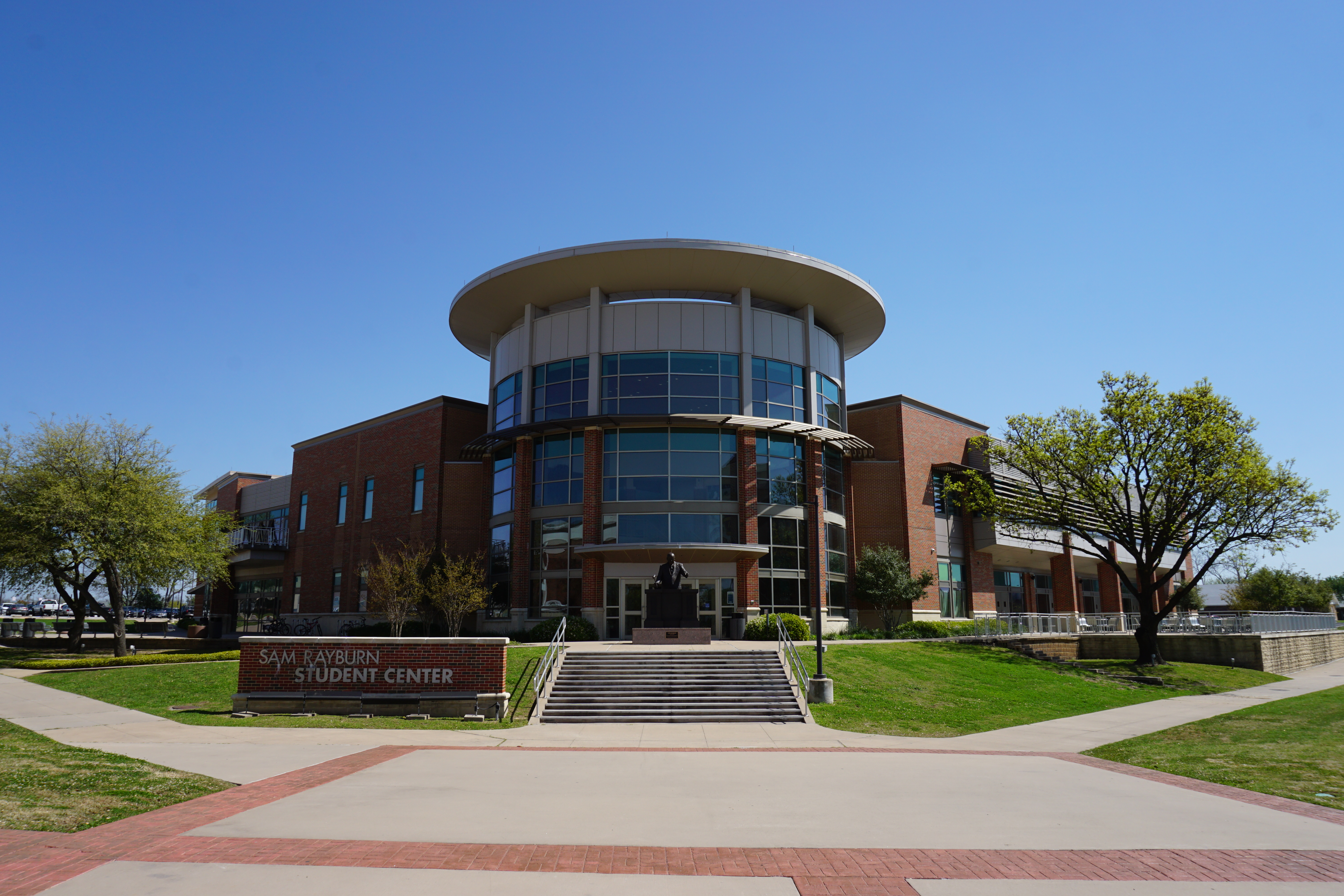
Rayburn Student Center in 2016

The history of Texas A&M University–Commerce (A&M–Commerce) since 1996 comprises the history of East Texas A&M University since East Texas State University (ETSU) was renamed and admitted into the Texas A&M University System. In this period, A&M–Commerce has been led by four presidents: Jerry D. Morris, Keith D. McFarland, Dan R. Jones, and Ray M. Keck, and has seen the number of students increase from 7,400 in 2000 to 13,000 in 2015. A number of new buildings have been added since 1996, most notably the Morris Recreation Center (opened in 2003), the Keith D. McFarland Science Building (2006), the Rayburn Student Center (2009), and the Music Building (2011). In 2016, the university's Carnegie Classification was upgraded to "Doctoral University-Higher Research Activity" (R2), due in part to an Air Force Research Laboratory (AFRL) Summer Faculty Fellowship and Fulbright Scholarships awarded to its faculty.

A&M–Commerce has become increasingly diverse during this period, most notably in terms of Hispanic students, who have grown from approximately 7% of the student body in 2008 to about 18% in 2015, which has allowed the university to be designated an "emerging" Hispanic-serving institution (HSI) in 2014. A&M–Commerce has also created an Honors College, a related Regents' Scholars Program, and a nursing program since 1996. Additionally, the university collaborates with area junior colleges such as Eastfield College, Navarro College, Paris Junior College, and Tyler Junior College.

== Transition to the Texas A&M University System ==
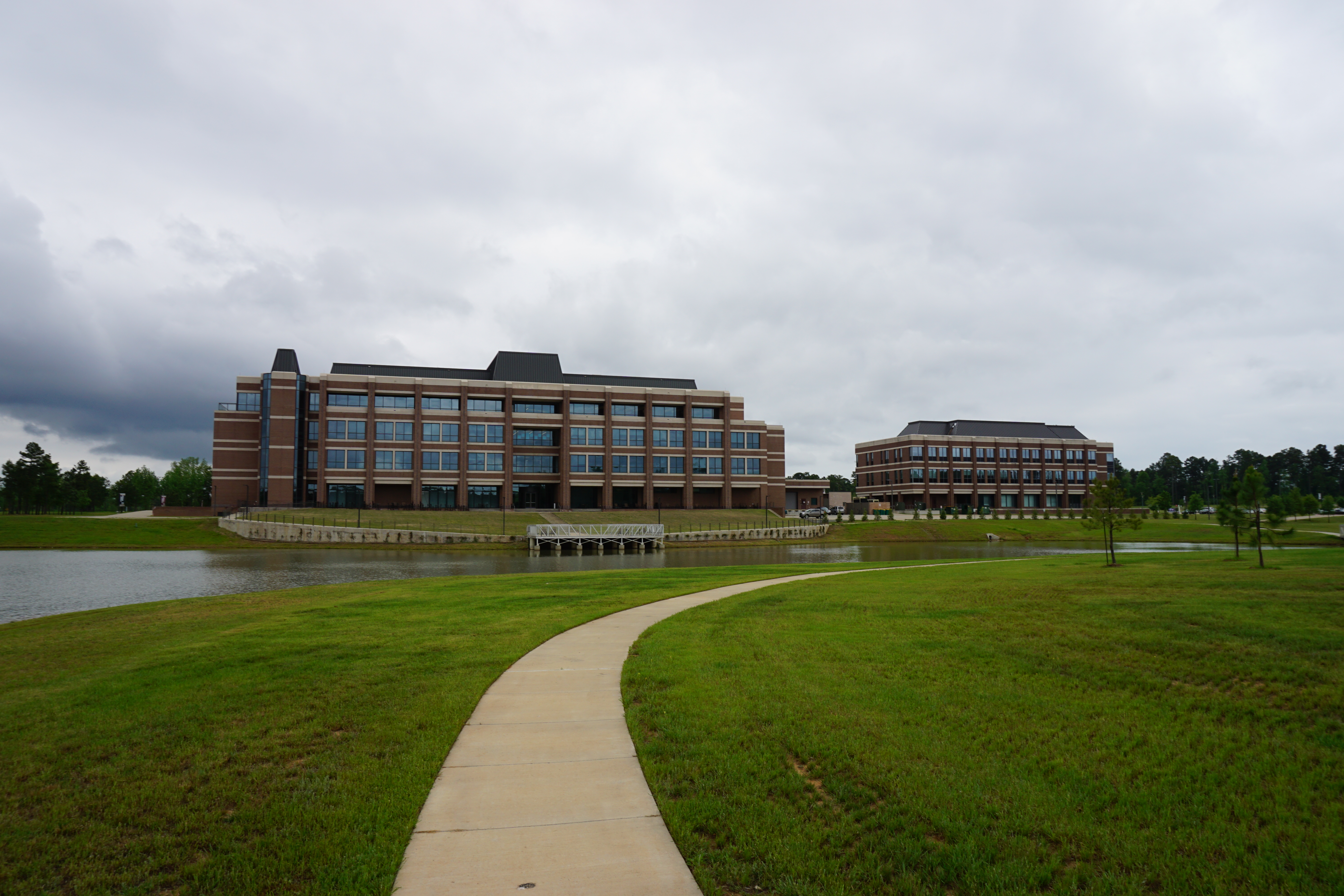
Texas A&M University–Texarkana campus in 2016

East Texas State University (ETSU) was renamed Texas A&M University–Commerce (A&M–Commerce) in 1996 when it joined the Texas A&M University System (TAMUS), during the tenure of President Jerry D. Morris. ETSU's main campus in Commerce was one of three institutions to join TAMUS that year, along with its branch campus in Texarkana (renamed Texas A&M University–Texarkana) and Baylor College of Dentistry in Dallas. In 2012, then-President Dan R. Jones credited joining TAMUS with accelerating the growth and beautification of the A&M–Commerce campus.

== McFarland presidency ==
In 1998, graduate school dean Keith D. McFarland was named the 10th president in the history of A&M–Commerce. By 1999, the university was offering classes at its Metroplex Center in Mesquite, the Universities Center at Dallas (through the Federation of North Texas Area Universities), and at Navarro College in Corsicana, in addition to at its main campus. It also began holding commencement exercises in Corsicana in 2001, graduating over 2,000 students there by 2015. During the fall semester in 1999, the university counted 7,762 students and 235 faculty, and was divided into three colleges: the College of Arts and Sciences, the College of Business and Technology, and the College of Education. Total enrollment grew from 7,400 in 2000 to nearly 9,000 in 2007.

In 2002, a former A&M–Commerce cafeteria was repurposed and reopened as the Northeast Texas Children's Museum. In 2004, the university inaugurated a new Equine Program. A&M–Commerce founded the Bill Martin Jr Memorial Symposium in 2005, which honors children's author Bill Martin, Jr. and focuses on teaching reading to children. Since the inaugural event, its keynote speakers have included Brod Bagert, Gloria Houston, Steven Kellogg, Jerry Pallotta, Brian Pinkney, and Jane Yolen. In 2005, the university remodeled its Wathena Temple Home Economics Building into the Wathena Temple Fine Arts Building, as a replacement for the Creative Arts Village that had existed since the 1970s.

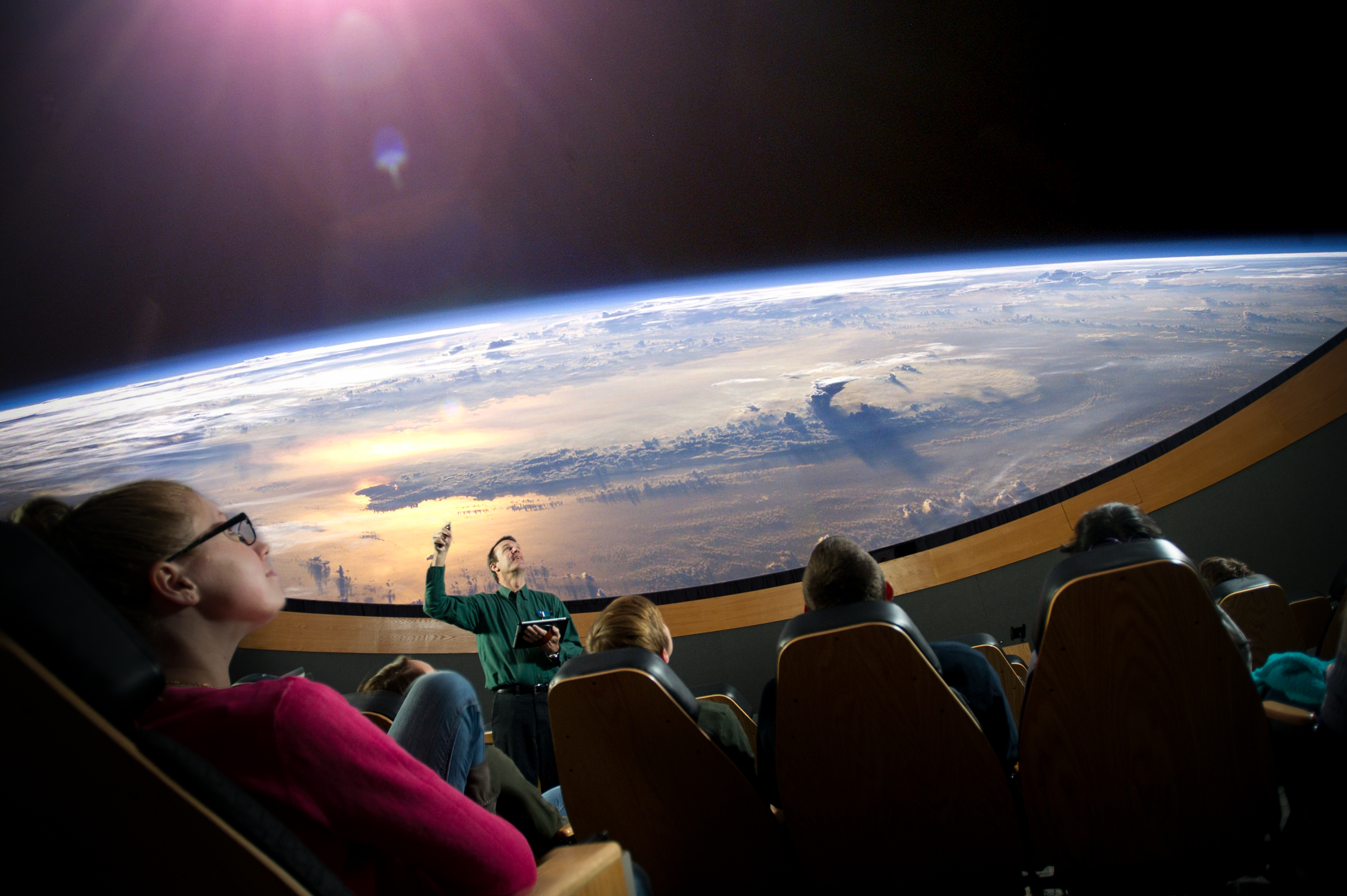
University planetarium in 2014

The National Science Foundation has supported research at A&M–Commerce with its Research Experiences for Undergraduates program since 2005, including a $300,000 award for chemistry research spanning from 2013 to 2016. The university opened a new science building in 2006, which is home to its Biology and Environmental Sciences, Chemistry, and Physics and Astronomy departments, as well as 29 research laboratories and an 87-seat planetarium. The planetarium hosted 28,000 visitors for its shows during the first year of its operation, nearly doubling its goal of 15,000 patrons for that year; by its second year, it had hosted over 60,000 people, the majority of whom were schoolchildren. In 2009, the planetarium celebrated the International Year of Astronomy by hosting a public observing night at the university's observatory and shows documenting Galileo and the history of the telescope.

Starting in 2006, A&M–Commerce has hosted the annual Cotton Belt Regional Railroad Symposium to document and preserve the history and legacy of the St. Louis Southwestern Railway, commonly referred to as the "Cotton Belt Route", and other former and current railroads in Arkansas, Louisiana, and Oklahoma as well as Texas. Also in 2006, musician and Fannin County native Ruby Allmond's music collection was donated to the university's James Gee Library by her longtime friend and musical collaborator, Audra Brock, after Allmond's death.

In 2007, A&M–Commerce established its Honors College, which provides full-ride scholarships, full fees, and free apartment housing for approximately 50 students each cohort. All Honors College students are required to maintain a grade point average (GPA) of 3.3 or higher, take 30 credit hours of honors-level courses, complete 96 hours of service, and successfully defend an honors thesis. The first cohort of 21 Honors College students graduated in May 2011. In fall 2010, the related Regents' Scholars Program was established, which annually awards 30 freshmen with a four-year scholarship that covers 70% of their tuition, fees, and room and board costs. The program emphasizes awareness of cultural and international issues, leadership, and traveling experiences.

In March 2007, A&M–Commerce library employees began conducting oral history interviews with area veterans of World War II, the Korean War, and the Vietnam War, collecting approximately 170 such interviews by July 2008. The resulting digital content was first made available to the public on Veterans Day in 2007, and by July 2008 25 oral history interviews could be accessed online from the library's website. Also during the 2007–08 academic year, the university demolished three former residential buildings: the Century House apartments, Hubbell Hall, and Mayo Hall, the latter two of which were men's dormitories.

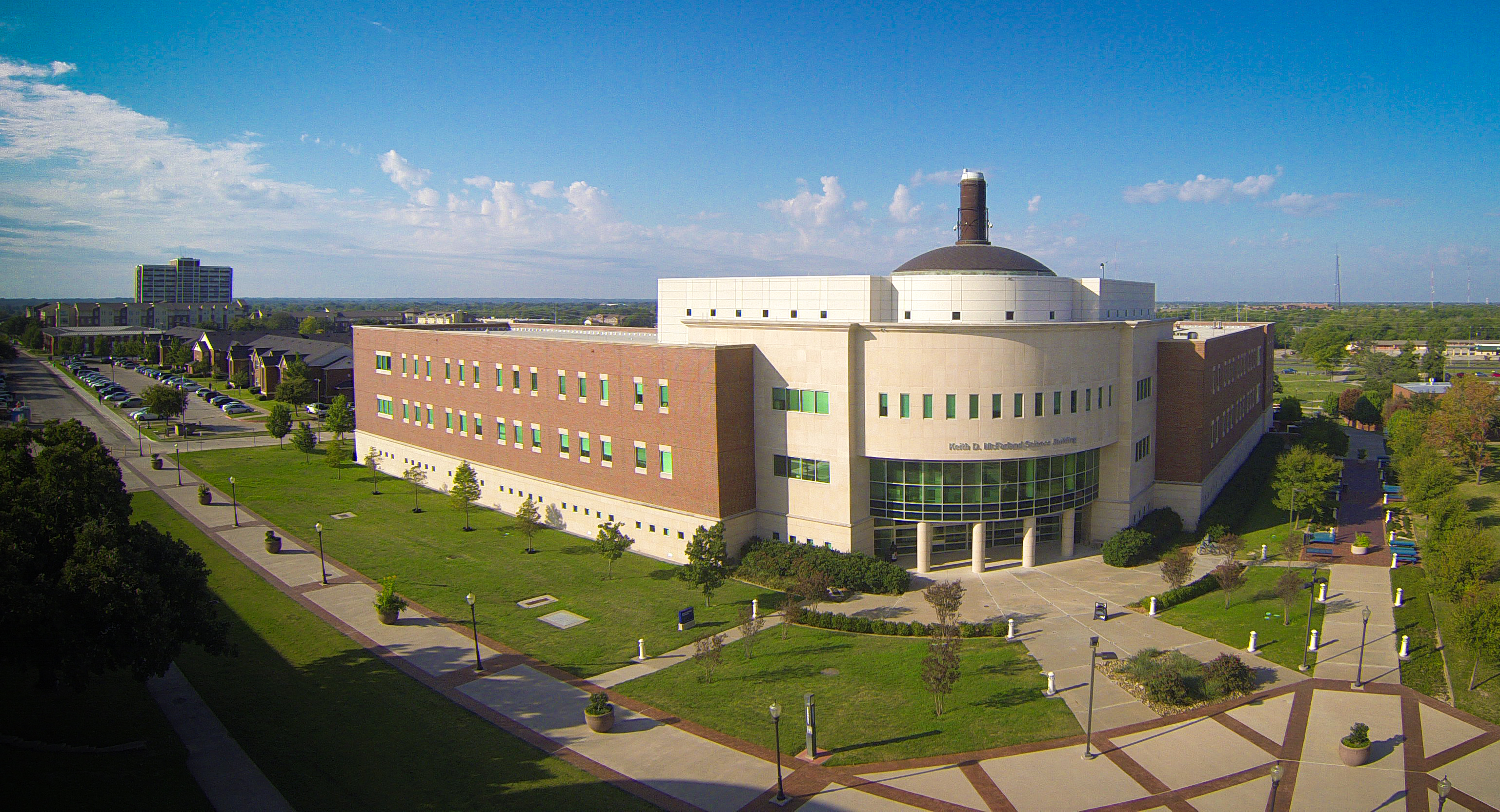
McFarland Science Building in 2013

In 2008, after broadcasting from the Performing Arts Center since 1977, campus radio station KETR moved into a new studio in Binnion Hall. In July of that year, the university announced needs-based $1,000 "Rising to the Challenge" scholarships for students at Grayson College, Navarro College, Paris Junior College, and the Eastfield campus of Trinity Valley Community College who were planning to transfer to A&M–Commerce. Also in 2008, President McFarland retired, although he later served as interim provost at Texas Woman's University in 2010 and then acting president of Texas A&M University–Texarkana in 2012. Also in 2012, A&M–Commerce renamed its science building as the Keith D. McFarland Science Building in his honor, which was formally marked with a renaming ceremony held in March 2013.

== Jones presidency ==
In July 2008, Dan R. Jones was named the 11th president of A&M–Commerce after serving as provost and vice president at fellow TAMUS member Texas A&M International University in Laredo for the previous five years. When Jones began as president in Commerce in 2008, Hispanic enrollment was approximately at 7% of the student body, although during his tenure it rose markedly, to about 18% by fall 2015. In spring 2009, the university created an Office of Hispanic Outreach as part of its efforts to become a Hispanic-serving institution (HSI). By spring 2014, it gained "emerging" HSI status as its full-time equivalent enrollment for Hispanic students surpassed 15%. In his first address to the university community in August 2008, Jones outlined three of his initiatives for demonstrating the value of the institution: strengthening "the link between strategic planning and the budget", implementing a "strategic enrollment management team", and focusing on service, both "to students and to one another".

In 2009, the university opened a student services-oriented "One Stop Shop" and a new student union, named the Rayburn Student Center after alumnus Sam Rayburn, which was expanded by 28,000 square feet (2,600 m^{2}) in 2014. By 2010, the growing university had an additional campus in Midlothian and also held classes at the Collin County Community College District and Northeast Texas Community College, in addition to in McKinney. That year also marked the inaugural Block Party, a concert for students held at the beginning of the fall semester. The university additionally purchased and began operating the 14-acre (5.7 ha) Twin Oaks Blueberry Farm, which is located south of campus in Campbell, in 2010. Also in 2010, A&M–Commerce's Children's Learning Center, which provides on-campus child care for parents who are students, staff, or faculty at the university, was awarded the prestigious "Texas Rising Star" distinction for "exceeding state licensing requirements". Additionally that calendar year, the university created the African American Male Mentor Program (AAMMP), which has the goal of providing its participants "with a rich, well-rounded university experience while strengthening their confidence, academic abilities, and self-esteem".

During the 2010–11 academic year, A&M–Commerce produced more teachers than any other university in TAMUS. By 2010, the university's enrollment exceeded 10,000 for the first time in its history. In 2011, enrollment eclipsed 11,000, and in 2012 it surpassed 12,000. In fall 2014, the trend continued as the university's enrollment set an all-time record at 12,321, while during fall 2015, it broke the 13,000-student mark for the first time.

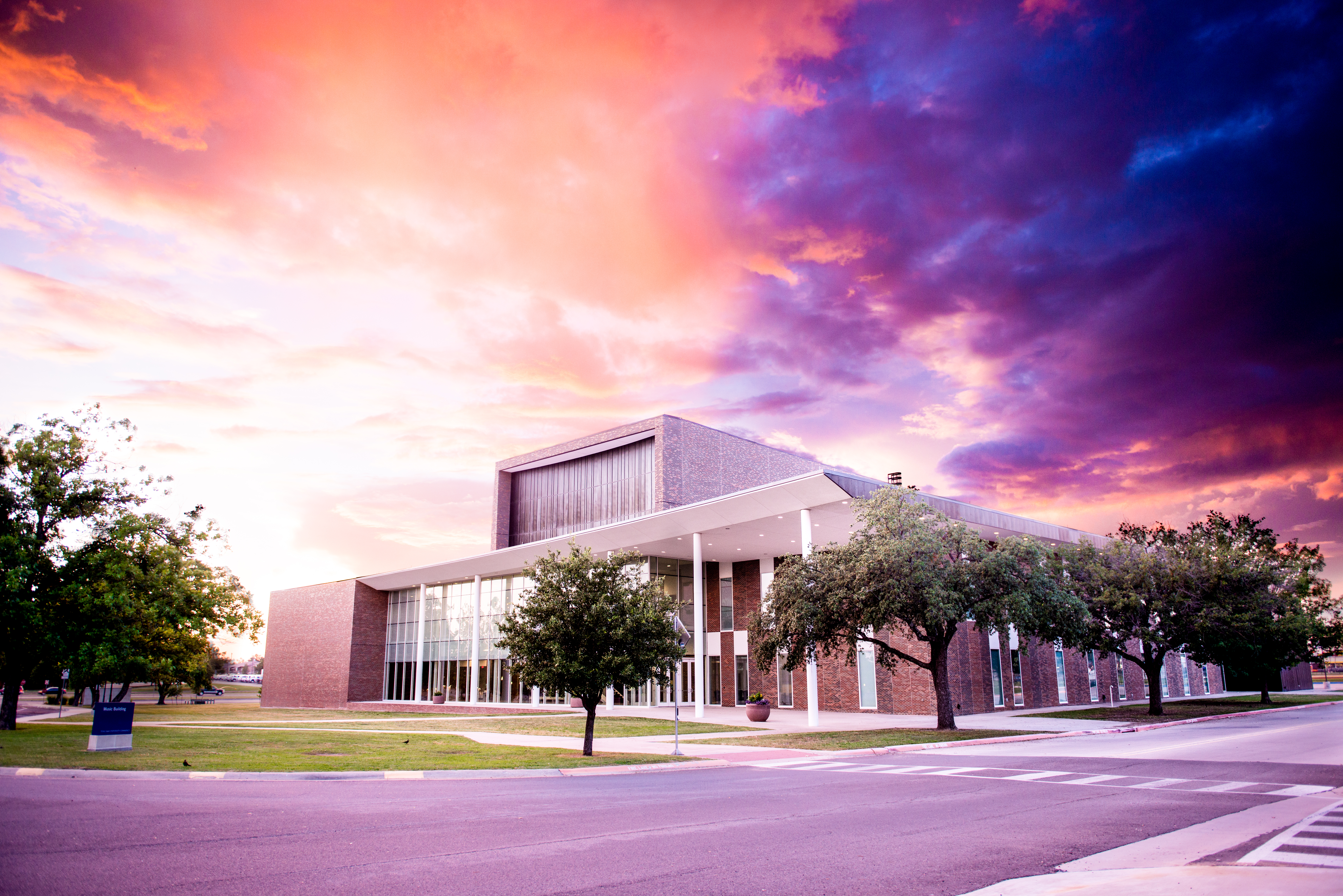
Music Building in 2014

In 2011, A&M–Commerce opened a new Music Building at a cost of $29 million that features a concert hall able to accommodate 600 people as well as a 75-seat recital hall and five rehearsal halls. That year the university also opened a then-unnamed, three-story residence hall (later christened Pride Rock), which cost $14 million to build and can house 258 students. Additionally, Fulbright Scholarships were awarded to history professor William Kuracina in 2011 (for conducting research in India), to Curriculum and Instruction doctoral student Diana L. Hopes in 2013 (Guatemala), and physics and astronomy professor Carlos Bertulani in 2015 (Brazil).

In 2012, A&M–Commerce's Wind Ensemble and Chorale performed in a show called "Deep in the HeART of Texas" at Carnegie Hall in New York City. Also in 2012, 44% of the university's operating budget was provided by tuition and fees, 32% by state appropriations, and the remaining 24% via other means. In October of that year, the university joined the Southeastern Association for Research in Astronomy consortium. New degrees and programs created by the university that year included a Bachelor of Science in Nursing degree program (which would be accredited by the Commission on Collegiate Nursing Education in December 2014) and an entirely online Master's of Science degree in biological science. A&M–Commerce also opened an off-campus instructional site in Rockwall in 2012, which the university announced would be closed in 2017 due largely to low enrollment. The university also began a credit-transfer partnership with Paris Junior College in 2012, and then secured similar partnerships with Tyler Junior College in 2013 and Navarro College as well as Eastfield College in 2015. In addition, the university built an amphitheater in 2012.

In 2013, Congressman Ralph Hall donated his personal papers and various memorabilia to the university library. Beginning that year, and every summer since, A&M–Commerce has sponsored a Civil Rights Movement educational trip to Alabama for students. In fall 2013, it finished construction on an enclosed Equine Pavilion at its Equine Center, which was renamed the Mary Bonham Equine Pavilion for university alumna and benefactor Mary Bonham in December 2014.

In 2014, A&M–Commerce celebrated its 125 anniversary. That year, The Chronicle of Higher Education named it the 17th fastest-growing university in the nation in its Almanac of Higher Education 2014, noting that its enrollment had grown by 39% between 2002 and 2012. In fall 2002, university enrollment was 8,542, compared to 11,871 in fall 2012. Also in 2014, A&M–Commerce collaborated with the University of Texas at Tyler on a teacher residency program that was awarded $1.29 million by the Texas Higher Education Coordinating Board. The university created the Texas Affordable Baccalaureate Program in 2014 as well; it is a competency-based degree that emphasizes organizational leadership and promises that an incoming student with no prior college credits can complete it in three years for no more than $15,000 total. By October 2016, the average cost of the program was just under $4,500. In November 2014, the university hosted its first Benefit Powwow to sponsor a scholarship.

In January 2015, A&M–Commerce began leasing Pacific Place in downtown Dallas, adjoining to and supplementing its existing presence in the city at the Universities Center at Dallas. Economics and Finance professor Srinivas Nippani and Chemistry professor Ben Jang were both awarded the Regents Professor Award in 2015, given by TAMUS to outstanding faculty who "have made exemplary contributions to their university or agency and to the citizens of Texas". Business Administration professor Edgar J. Manton won the same award during the 2009–10 academic year. Also in 2015, A&M–Commerce's theatre program became newly independent as the Department of Theatre. In September 2015, the university opened a new Serving Engaged Empowered & Diverse Students (S.E.E.D.S.) office to encourage diversity and inclusiveness on campus.

In spring 2016, A&M–Commerce's College of Humanities, Social Sciences and Arts implemented a "Low-Cost Textbook Initiative", offering select courses with total textbook costs not exceeding $25. In March 2016, the university's Carnegie Classification was upgraded to "Doctoral University-Higher Research Activity" (R2), from "Doctoral University-Moderate Research Activity" (R3). On April 29, 2016, President Jones died unexpectedly, in what university police later reported was a suicide.

== Keck presidency ==
On May 6, 2016, Ray M. Keck was named interim president of A&M–Commerce. He had previously served as president of Texas A&M International University in Laredo, where he had worked closely with Jones, who had been Keck's provost. In October 2016, A&M–Commerce and Collin College signed a partnership that offers university classes on the college's Preston Ridge Campus in Frisco. Also in October, the university officially dedicated the refurbished grave site of founding President William Mayo. On November 10, 2016, Keck was officially named the permanent president of A&M–Commerce.

== Student life ==
In fall 2010, the university's Fraternity and Sorority Life counted 15 chapters and 338 individuals as members, which grew to 20 chapters and almost 500 members by fall 2015.

Numerous university alumni have achieved distinction in the A&M–Commerce era. ETSU graduate Barry B. Thompson served as president of Tarleton State University in the 1980s before serving as chancellor of TAMUS from 1994 to 1999. 1999 A&M–Commerce graduate Sherilyn Emberton was elected the first female president of Indiana's Huntington University in 2013. In 2015, university alumna Beverlee J. McClure was named president of Adams State University in Colorado.

Photographer Erin Trieb graduated from A&M–Commerce in 2004. Other noted alumni of the university during the A&M–Commerce era include author NoViolet Bulawayo and photographer Mark Seliger. In 2015, university student Hannah Kirby participated as a contestant on the NBC television show The Voice.

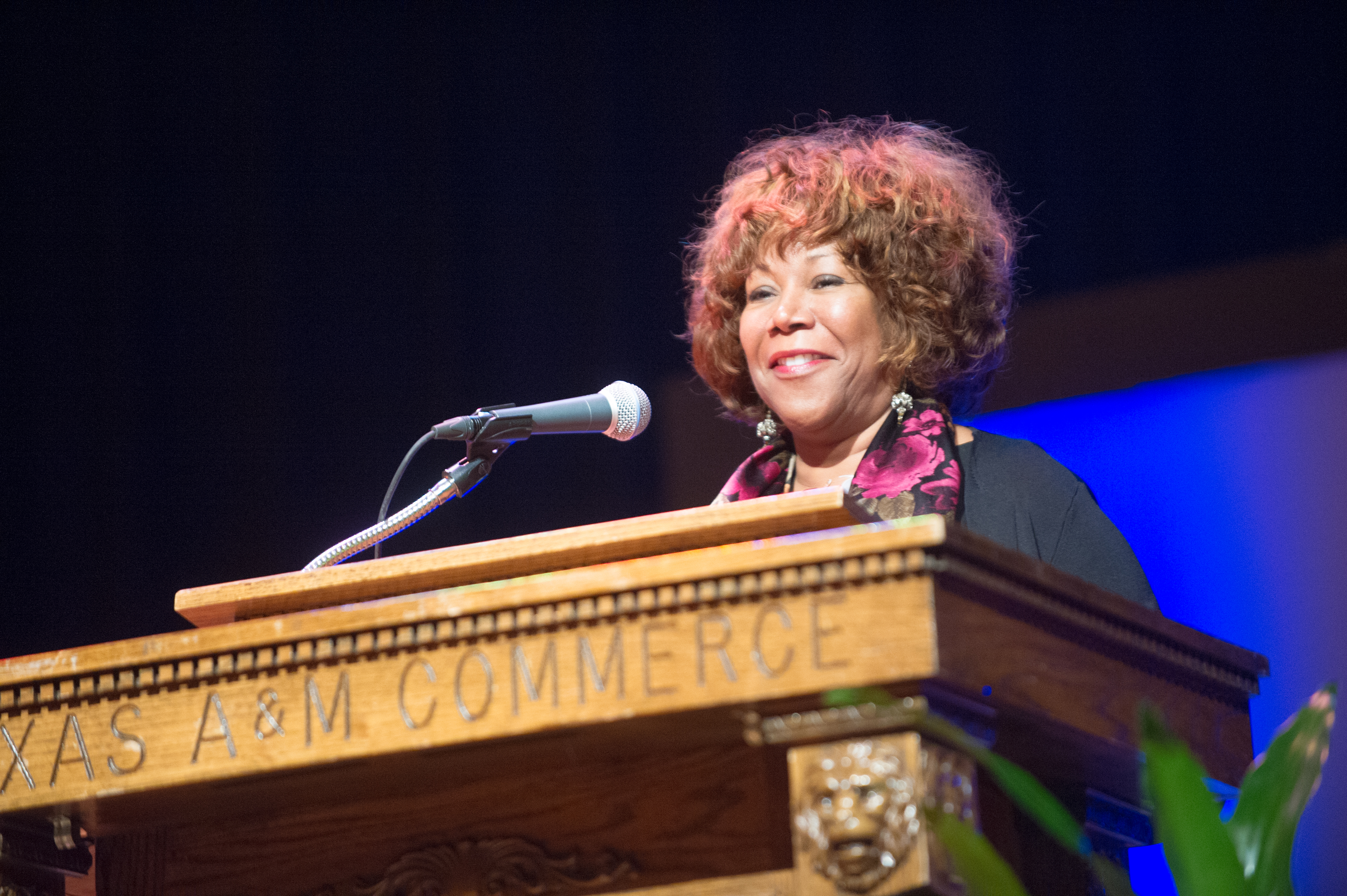
Ruby Bridges speaking on campus in 2015

Since 2011, a number of notable personalities have spoken at the university. As part of the William L. Mayo Prestigious Speaker Series, the campus has been visited by musician India Arie, civil rights activist Ruby Bridges, Ben & Jerry's co-founders Ben Cohen and Jerry Greenfield, SportsCenter anchor Linda Cohn, boxers Curtis Cokes, Troy Dorsey, Victor Ortiz, and John Ruiz, Olympians Ryan Lochte and Misty May-Treanor, actor RJ Mitte, and journalist Dan Rather. As part of the grant-funded Latino Americans: 500 Years of History series, between fall 2015 and spring 2016 the campus hosted talks by cartoonist Lalo Alcaraz, comic book artists Jaime and Gilbert Hernandez, and ethnic studies professor David Montejano. Resumed in fall 2016, the Sam Rayburn Speaker Series brought other notable people to campus, including history professor Jeremy Adelman and philosopher Cornel West. Other personalities of note to speak on campus include basketball player Bruce Bowen, athlete (and former ETSU student) John Carlos, author Rachel Cruze, astronaut and scientist Mae Jemison, athlete Kyle Maynard, football player Nate Newton, poet Tim Seibles, writer Will Self, and Tuskegee Airman Calvin J. Spann. Additionally, prominent concerts at the university were given by the United States Navy Band in February 2014 and the United States Marine Band in October 2015.

== Athletics ==
Margo Harbison served as athletic director of ETSU and A&M–Commerce from 1988 to 1999, and also served as a member of the NCAA Division II Restructuring Committee and Postgraduate Scholarship Committee. Carlton Cooper served as athletic director from 2007 to 2012. Ryan Ivey was his replacement, from January 2013 until his resignation in August 2015 to accept the same position at Austin Peay. Ivey's permanent replacement, Tim McMurray, was introduced as athletic director in October 2015. During the 2015–16 academic year, the university's athletics department celebrated its 100th anniversary.

Wide receiver James Epps set a school record for the Lions football team by recording 1,058 yards receiving in 1996. In 2001, the Lions posted their last winning season and last win over a ranked team until 2013, and their last appearance in the Division II top 25 until 2014. The team appeared for the first time on national television in 2007, and made its second such appearance on CBS Sports Network's Division II National Football Game of the Week in 2012, when it played Midwestern State University in the Lone Star Classic Football Festival at Cowboys Stadium in Arlington for the second year in a row. Former Kentucky and Baylor head coach Guy Morriss coached the Lions between 2009 and 2012.

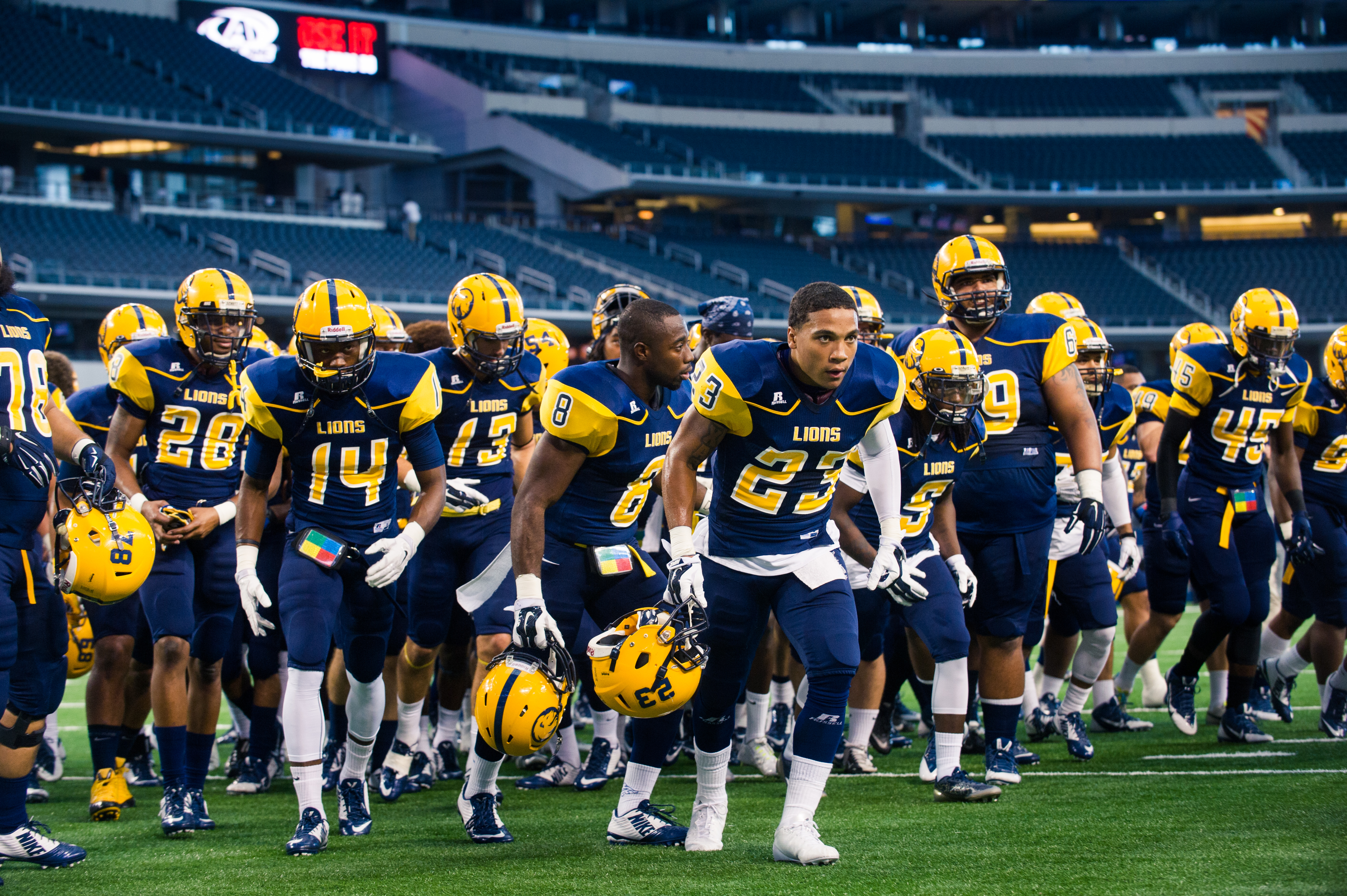
2014 football team

Colby Carthel, who had played linebacker for the Angelo State Rams from 1996 to 1999, was named the A&M–Commerce head coach in January 2013, following the resignation of Morriss in November 2012. During the 2013 season, the team upset NCAA Division I FCS team Houston Baptist, 55–21. In December 2013, three Lions football players were named to the All-Super Region Four team: defensive end Charles Tuaau (first team), as well as wide receiver Vernon Johnson and defensive end Tevin Moore (second team). Darvin Peterson and Tuaau were the fifth and sixth Lions to be named to the AFCA All-America first team when they accomplished the feat in 2006 and 2013, respectively. During the 2014 season, the Lions set a Division II record for total offense when they accumulated 986 yards against East Texas Baptist in a 98–20 win. Lions football players of this era who went on to play in the National Football League include Cedric Bonner, who signed with the Atlanta Falcons in 2005, and 2012 Lone Star Conference (LSC) Linebacker of the Year Danny Mason, who signed with the Denver Broncos in 2015.

The men's basketball team won the 1996 LSC championship and qualified for three straight NCAA Division II tournaments between 1996 and 1998. During the 2004–05 season, it won the LSC title again and advanced to the Regional Finals of the NCAA tournament. It would be another decade before it would win its next conference tournament championship in 2015.

Nicole Anderson coached the women's basketball team from 2009–10 to 2013–14, compiling an overall record of 26–106 and 16–68 in the LSC. In June 2014, two of the team's players, Aubree Butts and Devin Oliver, were killed in a car crash that also injured their teammates La'Tisha Hearne and Zenobia Winbush. Additionally in 2014, 1998 A&M–Commerce graduate Miranda Serna, who was at the time working as an assistant coach for the Oklahoma State Cowgirls basketball team, was killed in a plane crash.

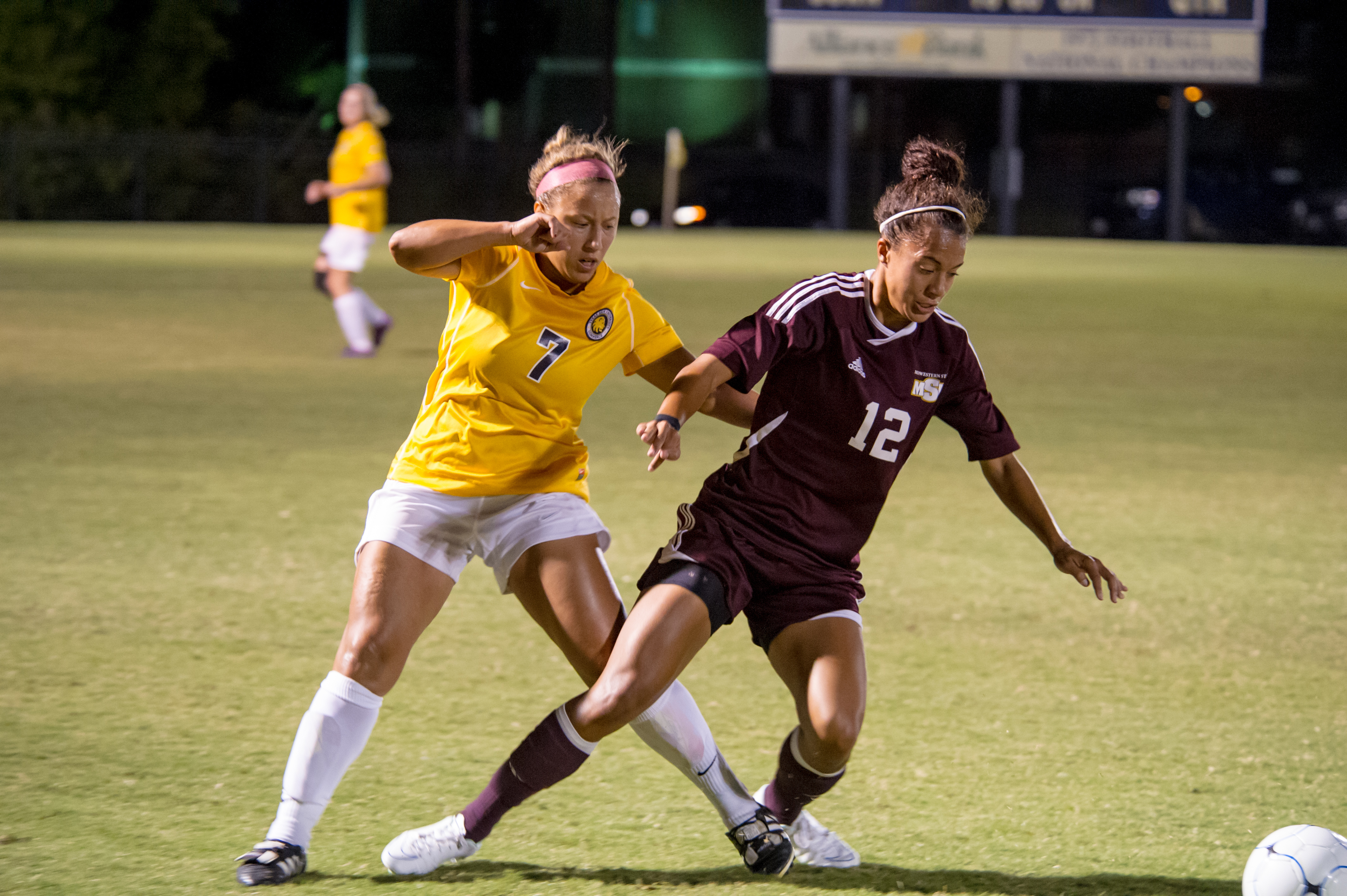
2014 women's soccer team vs. the Midwestern State Mustangs

The women's soccer team was established in 1995, and after competing as an independent for one season, it began play as an LSC member when the conference began officially sponsoring the sport in 1996. After beginning as an assistant for the 1997 season, Neil Piper was named head coach of the team for 1998. The Lions proceeded to win the LSC conference tournament in 1999, 2004, and 2014 under Piper, as well as finishing as runners-up in 2003, 2006, and 2008. The team also qualified for the NCAA Division II tournament in 2008 and 2013.

Under head coach Mark Copeland, himself a four-year football letter winner while a student-athlete at ETSU, the men's golf team led the nation in scoring average in 1997 and won the LSC title in 1998. The A&M–Commerce men's track and field team qualified one relay team and four individual athletes for the 2005 NCAA Division II Track and Field Championships in Abilene. In May 2015, the Lions men's track and field team won its first LSC championship in 48 years and earned a #1 national ranking in Division II.

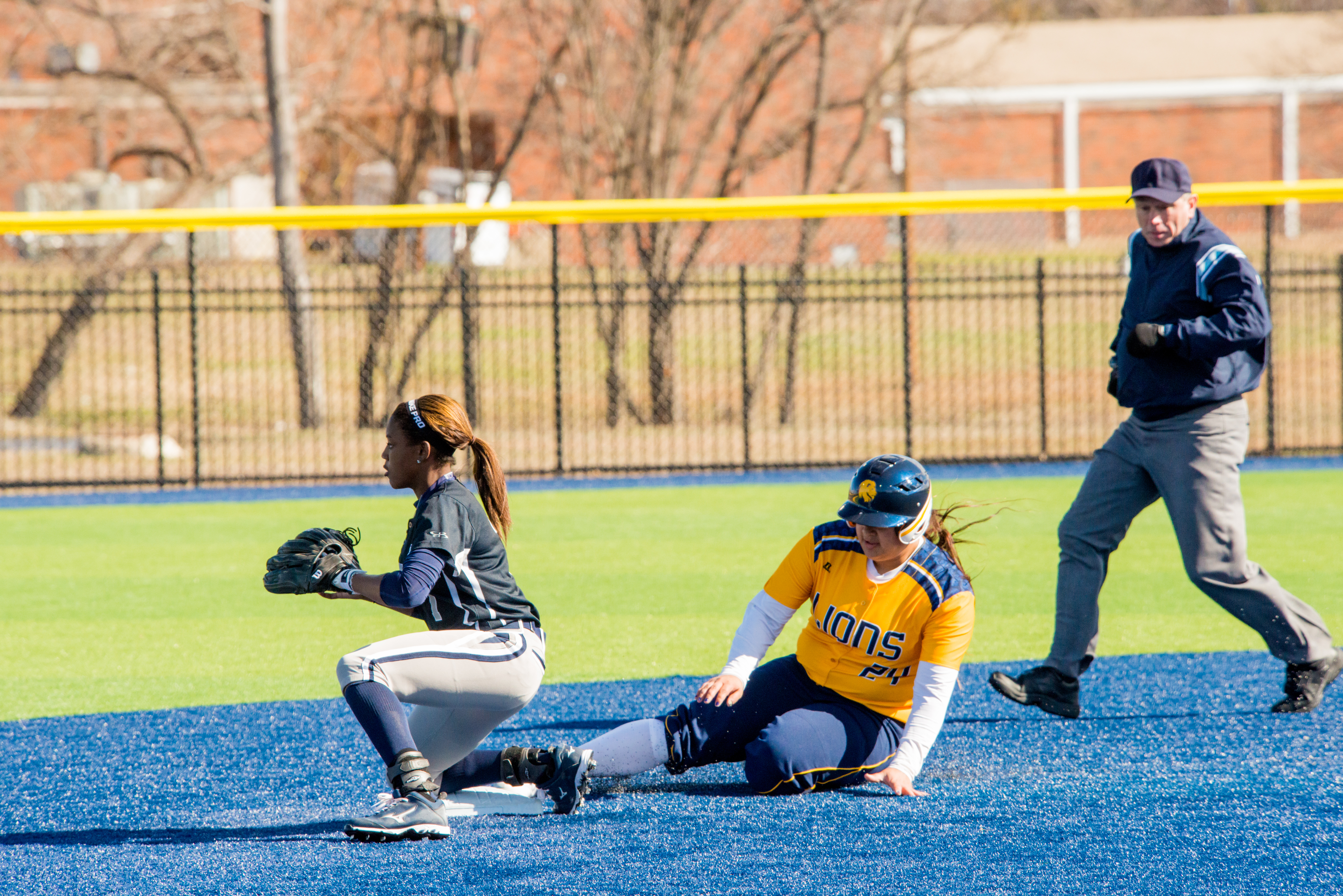
2015 softball team vs. the St. Edward's Hilltoppers

After the creation of the program was announced in May 2013 and former Henderson State University and Texas Woman's University coach Richie Bruister was signed as its inaugural head coach in July 2013, the Lions softball team began play in spring 2015. In 2016, in just its second season, the team qualified for the NCAA Division II tournament.

In 2015, the university created a new intercollegiate equestrian team that competes in the Intercollegiate Horse Show Association.

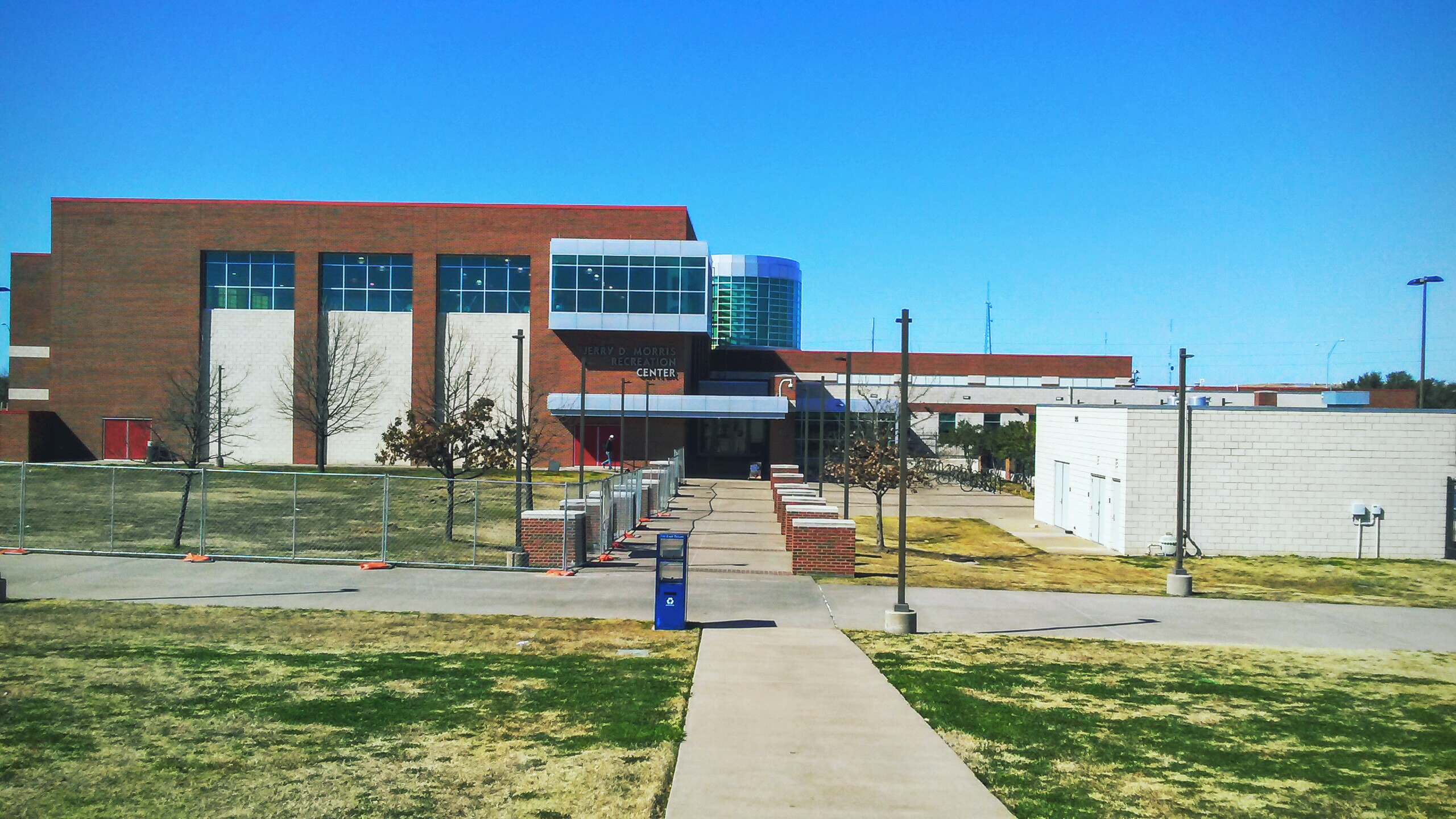
Morris Recreation Center in 2016

A&M–Commerce built the Morris Recreation Center (MRC) in 2003, featuring two basketball courts, bouldering and climbing walls, an indoor jogging track, an outdoor swimming pool, racquetball courts, and facilities for weight training. In 2013, university students and Climbing Society members set two Guinness World Records on its climbing walls, for "Greatest Vertical Distance Climbed in 6 Hours by a Team" (12,340 meters (40,485 ft 7 in)) and "Fastest Time to Climb Everest on an Indoor Climbing Wall (Team)" (4 hours, 24 minutes, and 33 seconds). In fall 2015, the MRC raised its semester fees after 70% of students voted for the increase in a referendum; among the resulting improvements were a new outdoor multi-activity court and an expansion providing more space for cardio and weight training equipment, fitness programing, personal training, rock climbing, and student activities.
