= East Texas A&M University =

Public research university in Commerce, Texas, US

- Former names: East Texas Normal College (1889–1917); East Texas State Normal College (1917–1923); East Texas State Teachers College (1923–1957); East Texas State College (1957–1965); East Texas State University (1965–1996); Texas A&M University–Commerce (1996–2024)
- Motto: Ceaseless Industry, Fearless Investigation, Unfettered Thought, Unselfish Service to Others.
- Type: Public research university
- Established: 1889
- Endowment: $33.2 million (2022)
- President: Mark J. Rudin
- Academic staff: 603
- Students: 11,500 (fall 2023)
- Undergraduates: 8,134 (fall 2023)
- Postgraduates: 3,366 (fall 2023)
- Location: Commerce, Texas, United States; 33°14′32″N 95°54′28″W
- Campus: Rural, 2,203 acres (8.92 km^{2})
- Colors: Blue and gold
- Nickname: Lions
- Sporting affiliations: NCAA Division I - Southland Conference
- Mascot: The Lions
- Website: etamu.edu

East Texas A&M University (ETAMU; formerly Texas A&M University–Commerce) is a public research university in Commerce, Texas, United States. With an enrollment of over 12,000 students as of fall 2017, the university is the third-largest institution in the Texas A&M University System. Founded in 1889, the institution is also the fifth-oldest state university or college in the State of Texas. The university is classified among "R2: High Research Spending and Doctorate Production".

Located on the northeastern edge of the Dallas-Fort Worth metroplex, approximately 65 miles (105 km) from downtown Dallas, the university attracts traditional resident students from the Metroplex and also from the smaller communities of Northeast Texas. In addition to the main campus in Hunt County, the university has satellite campuses in downtown Dallas and Mesquite; it also offers courses in Corsicana and Midlothian in partnership with Navarro College and in Frisco and McKinney with Collin College.

== History ==
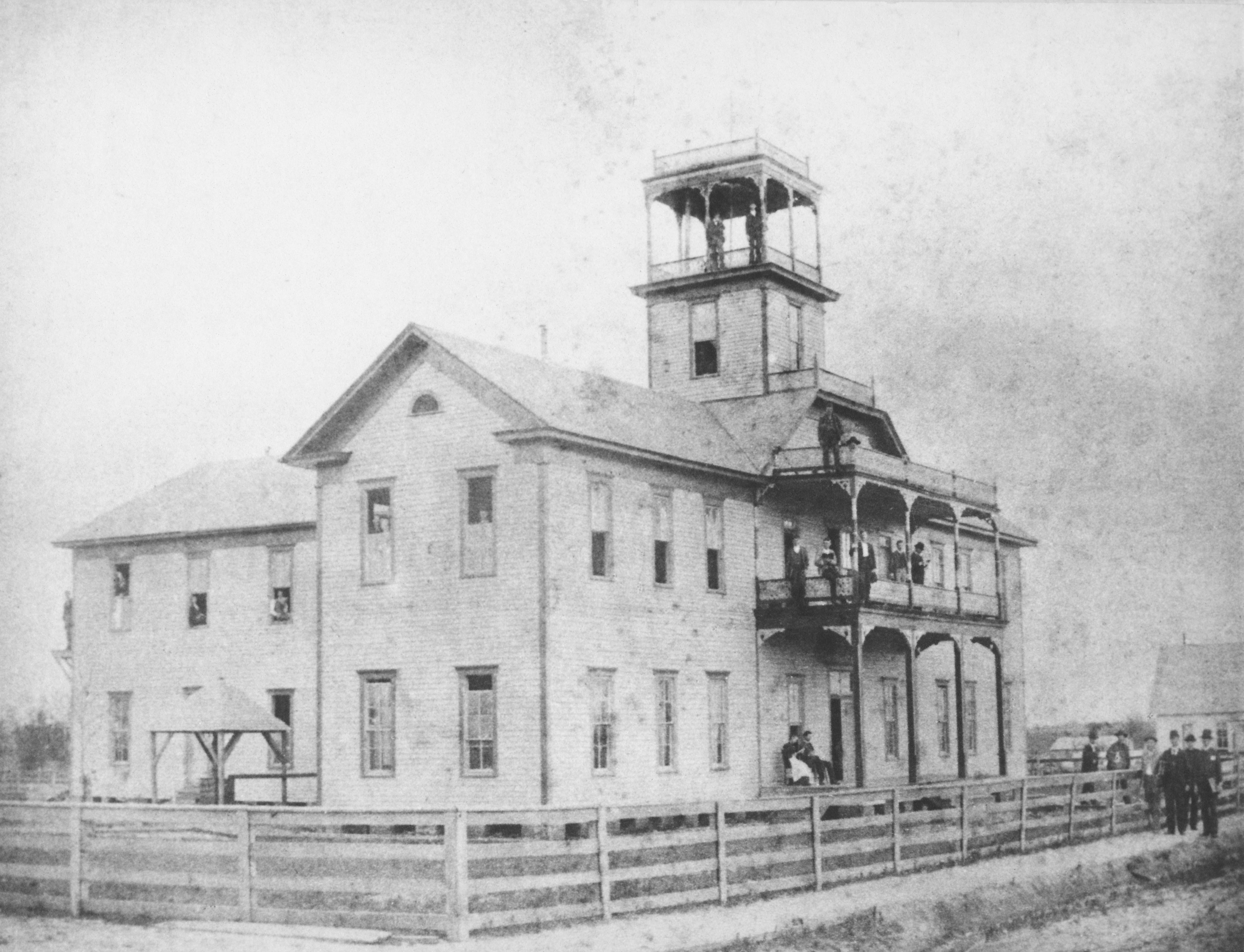
Original ETNC campus in Cooper in 1890

The history of East Texas A&M University commenced in 1889 with its establishment as East Texas Normal College (ETNC) in Cooper by Kentucky native William L. Mayo as a private teachers' college based on Normal principles. ETNC relocated to Commerce after its original campus was destroyed in a fire in July 1894. One of Commerce's chief advantages was that it was well connected by rail, boasting regular service on the St. Louis Southwestern Railway of Texas ("Cotton Belt") to Dallas, Sherman, and Texarkana and on the Texas Midland Railroad to Paris, Ennis, and Houston.

ETNC was renamed East Texas State Normal College in 1917 after it was acquired by the State of Texas and transformed into a public college. In 1923, it was renamed East Texas State Teachers College to define its purpose "more clearly", and in 1935, it began its graduate education program.

The institution was renamed East Texas State College in 1957, after the Texas Legislature recognized its broadening scope beyond teacher education. Following the inauguration of the institution's first doctoral program in 1962, its name was changed to East Texas State University (ETSU) in 1965. It integrated in 1964 when ordered to do so by the board of regents. ETSU obtained a separate board of regents in 1969, and the approval to open a branch campus in Texarkana in 1971.

While the student body shrank in size in the late 1970s and early 1980s, it became increasingly diverse as older nontraditional students, ethnic and racial minorities, and international students all grew in numbers. The economic downturn in Texas in the mid-1980s seriously threatened the university, leading to proposals to close it entirely before a bus trip with 450 supporters trekked to the State Capitol in a show of support that ultimately secured its continued existence. In 1996, ETSU was admitted into the Texas A&M University System (TAMUS) and renamed Texas A&M University–Commerce (A&M–Commerce). ETSU's former branch campus in Texarkana was renamed Texas A&M University–Texarkana and admitted into TAMUS as a separate university.

Former logo under Texas A&M University–Commerce

During the summer of 2024, the university administration along with the Texas A&M University System began discussions regarding the possibility of another name change for the University that would "more accurately brand the school and reflect the university's mission to recruit future college students in the Dallas–Fort Worth Metroplex as well as Northeast Texas." The first proposal was to change the university's name to Texas A&M University–Dallas to establish stronger ties to Dallas County and the DFW Metroplex, where most of the school's students come from. However, that idea was met with strong opposition from graduates, alumni, and community members, with many suggesting if there was to be a name change, it should to be to East Texas A&M University. On August 7, 2024, university president Dr. Mark Rudin announced via social media that he "could not support the option of changing the name to Texas A&M University–Dallas not now, nor in the future." This caused a groundswell of support to change the name to East Texas A&M, which was the name that had been voted on by the students and alumni when the university joined the Texas A&M University System in 1996. Rudin announced his support for the name change to East Texas A&M University and announced he would be taking the motion to rename the university to the A&M System Board of Regents during their November meeting. Rudin took the motion to the board on November 7, 2024, and the university was renamed to East Texas A&M University the same day.

=== University presidents ===
1. William Leonidas Mayo (1889–1917)
2. Randolph Binnion (1917–24)
3. Samuel Henry Whitley (1924–46)
4. Arthur C. Ferguson (1947, interim)
5. James Gilliam Gee (1947–66)
6. D. Whitney Halladay (1966–72)
7. F.H. McDowell (1972–82)
8. Charles J. Austin (1982–87)
9. Jerry D. Morris (1987–97)
10. Keith D. McFarland (1997–2008)
11. Dan R. Jones (2008–16)
12. Ray Keck (2016–18)
13. Mark J. Rudin (2018–present)

== Colleges and schools ==
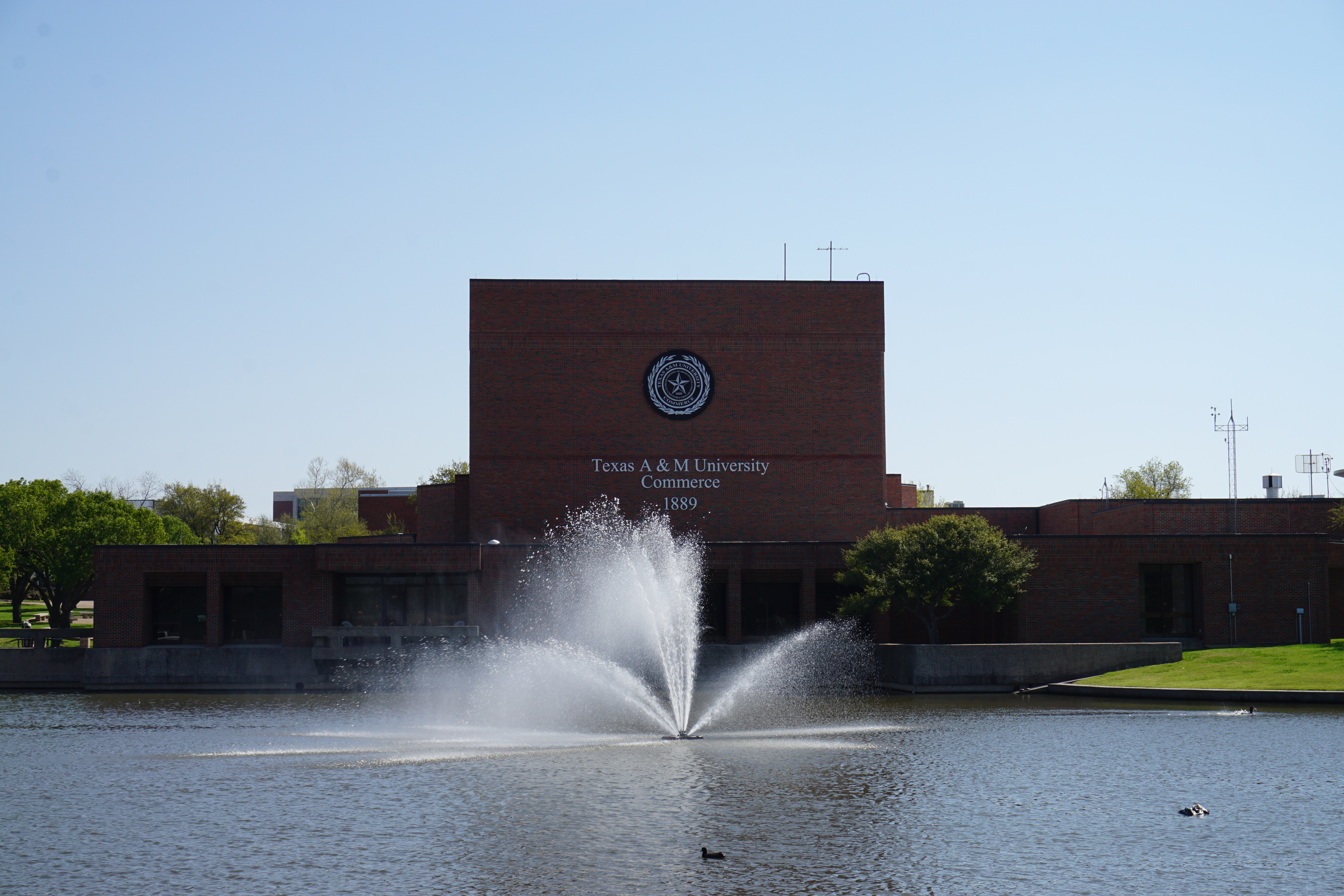
Garvin Lake at East Texas A&M

East Texas A&M comprises six academic colleges awarding degrees in more 100 diverse disciplines.

The College of Education and Human Services has produced numerous notable teachers and school administrators. East Texas A&M has agreements with multiple school districts in the DFW area and Northeast Texas to send their undergraduates to student-teach, as well as a graduate school for those pursuing advanced degrees, including a doctoral program for a PhD in education. East Texas A&M is a Level II Doctoral Research University, classified by the Carnegie Foundation for the Advancement of Teaching. The College of Education and Human Services at East Texas A&M was ranked number one in Texas for teaching education among all universities, public and private, and 13th in the entire nation, by the Directory of U.S. Colleges Database Online Magazine in the summer of 2013.

Academic rankings

National
- U.S. News & World Report: 293-381

The College of Business (CB) has over the past three decades become a Tier II business school in Texas and beyond. The CB offers graduate and undergraduate degrees in accounting, finance, general business administration, management, marketing, applied arts and sciences, and business analytics. The CB has been recognized for its MBA program, and was ranked as the fifth-best program overall in the 2012 edition of U.S. News & World Report's annual "Best Graduate School" issue. Both the MBA and the undergraduate accounting programs were mentioned in both Forbes and the Wall Street Journal as best buys for programs offered by Tier II schools in Texas. The college also has a large number of professors with tenure and emeritus status, who provide lectures and speaking engagements nationally and internationally, which reflects the quality of business-oriented educational opportunity that East Texas A&M has to offer.

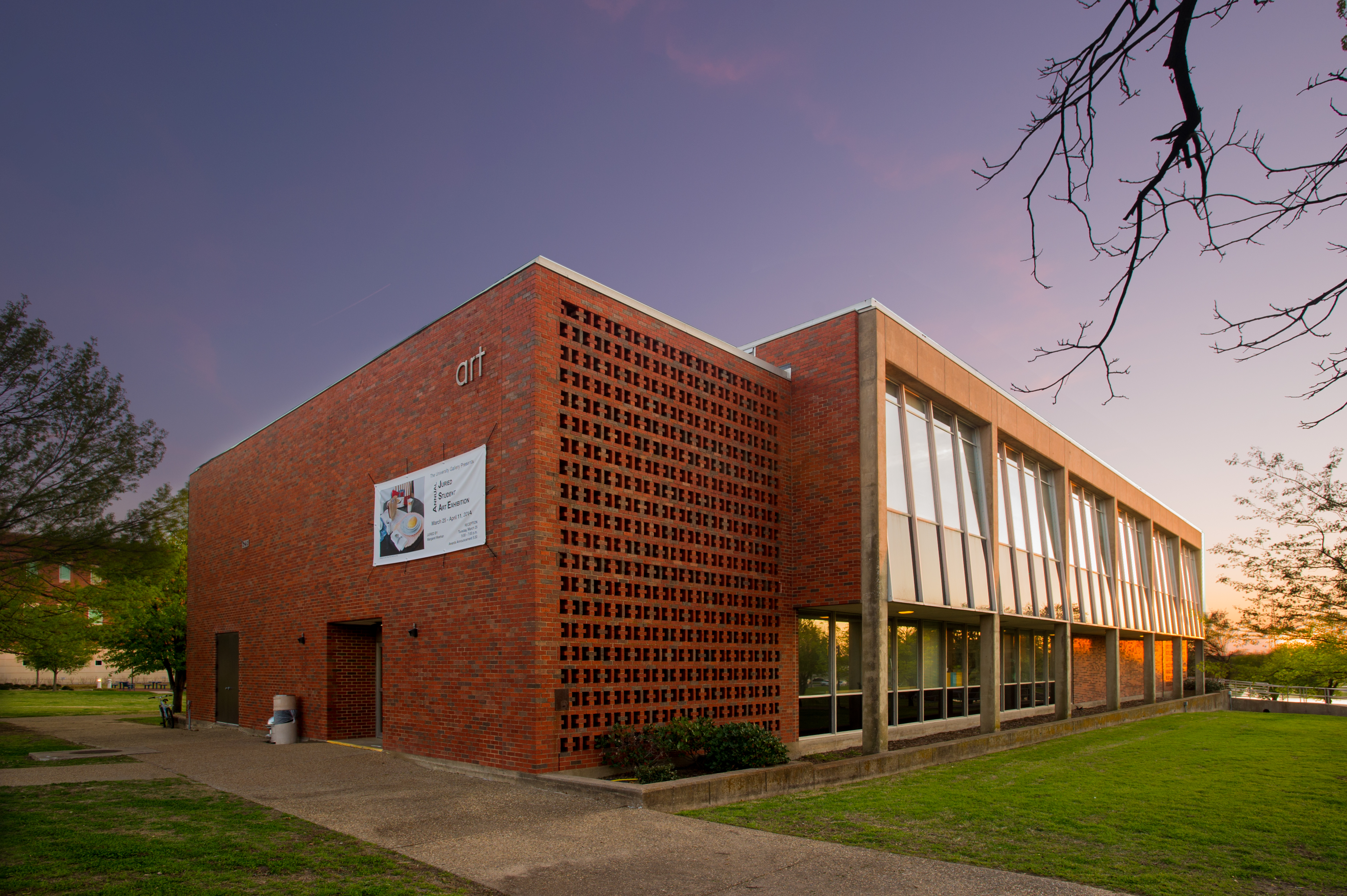
Art Building

The College of Humanities, Social Sciences, and Arts offers degree programs for most liberal-arts programs offered at East Texas A&M. Degrees and courses of study offered in this college include liberal arts, history, performing arts, music and music education, literature and language, mass media and communications, theatre, political science, and sociology and criminal justice. The college also offers undergraduates who are pursuing a political science degree who wish to attend law school for postgraduate work, a career in a law-preparatory program, as well as LSAT test preparation that is also administered on campus. Students who major in broadcast journalism and mass media are given the opportunity to join the staff for the school newspaper, and also use and perfect skills working for KKOM, KETV-3, and the region's source for public broadcasting radio news and information, KETR.

The College of Science and Engineering is the most recent academic addition at East Texas A&M. This college offers degrees in biology, environmental sciences, chemistry, computer science and information systems, computational science, mathematics, engineering technology, physics, and astronomy. The physics and astronomy department has an award-winning planetarium located within the McFarland Science Building, attracting students from area schools and interested visitors, as well.

The College of Agricultural Sciences and Natural Resources The School of Agriculture was renamed the College of Agricultural Sciences and Natural Resources in April 2018. Majors include agribusiness, agricultural sciences, agricultural science and technology, animal science, wildlife and conservation science, and equine studies. The college operates an educational farm and ranch about 5 miles south of Commerce on Texas State Highway 24, where students are able to engage in a hands-on approach to agriculture sciences and animal handling.

The College of Innovation and Design The college of innovation and design (CID) was formed in the fall of 2019. The purpose was to give an innovative experience to students while allowing them to study multiple disciplines. Currently, the CID offers eight degree plans.

== Campus ==
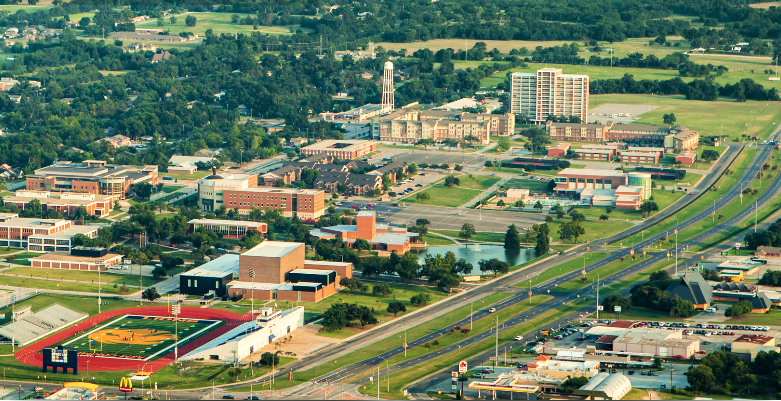
Aerial shot of East Texas A&M

The campus is located 15 minutes from Interstate 30 and an hour drive from Dallas, Texas State Highway 24 intersects the campus into two separate sections. The majority of the campus is located on the east side of Highway 24, and a smaller portion is located on the west side. A picturesque lake is located near the main campus entrance. The campus has a range of newer and older buildings, with the oldest building being Ferguson Social Sciences Building, which opened in 1926 with classrooms and a large auditorium. One of the newer buildings on campus is the Nursing and Health Sciences Building which was opened in 2020. The university also owns and operates an 1,800-acre farm and ranch with an equine center located near the main campus. A new music building was recently constructed that includes a state of the art concert hall for various musical performances.

=== Waters Library ===
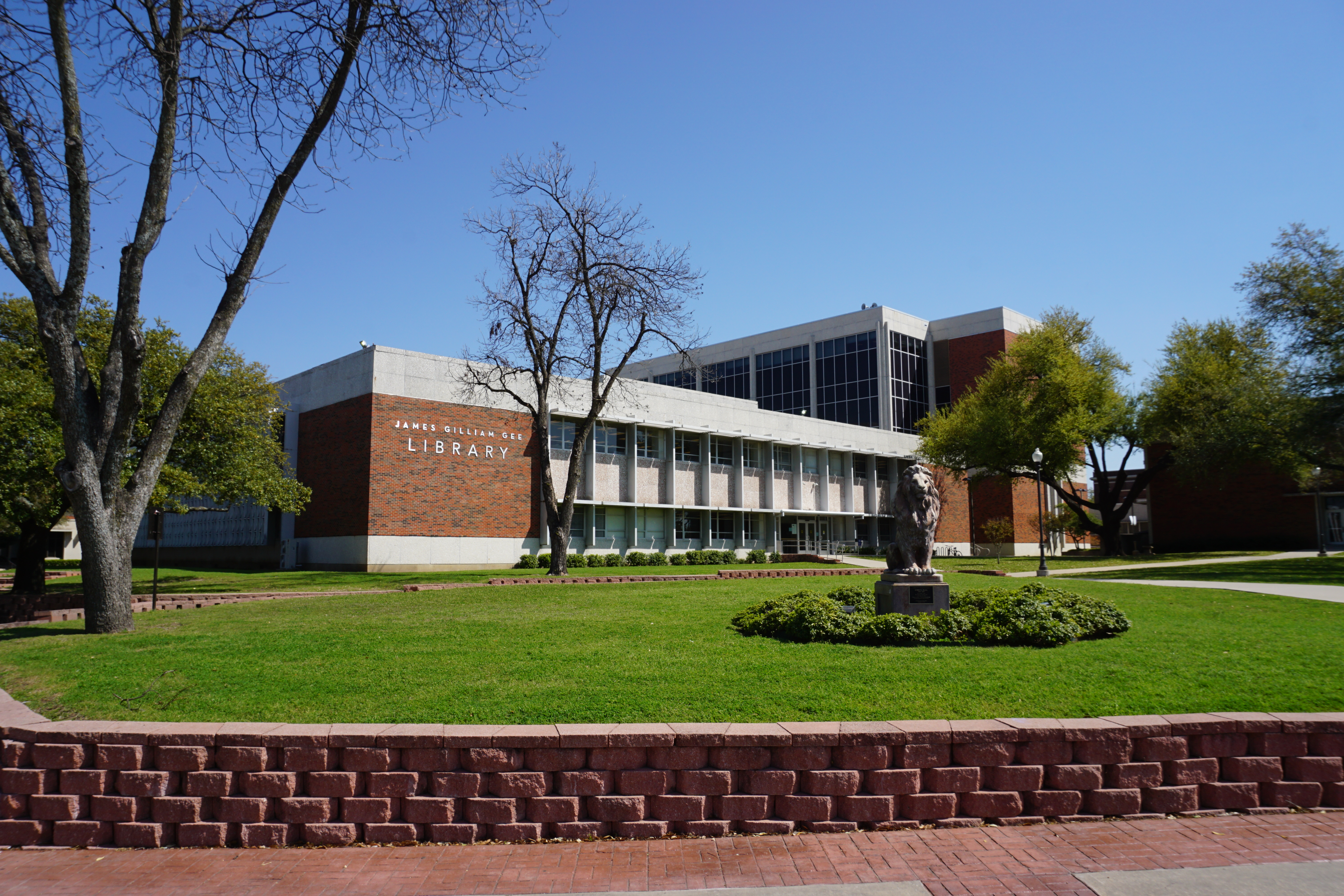
Waters Library

Velma K Waters Library is named in honor of the first undergraduate African American student to enroll at ETAMU. She graduated with a Bachelor of Science degree from the university in 1968 and taught in Carthage, Texas. The library was previously named in honor of James Gilliam Gee, a former president of the university who served from 1947 to 1966, but was renamed in August 2020. A laptop kiosk in the library allows students to check out laptops for their studies. Many services for students and faculty are available in the library, including book renewal, a 24-hour computer-study area known as the nexus, research assistance, and study carrels providing quiet study areas for students.

=== Morris Recreation Center ===
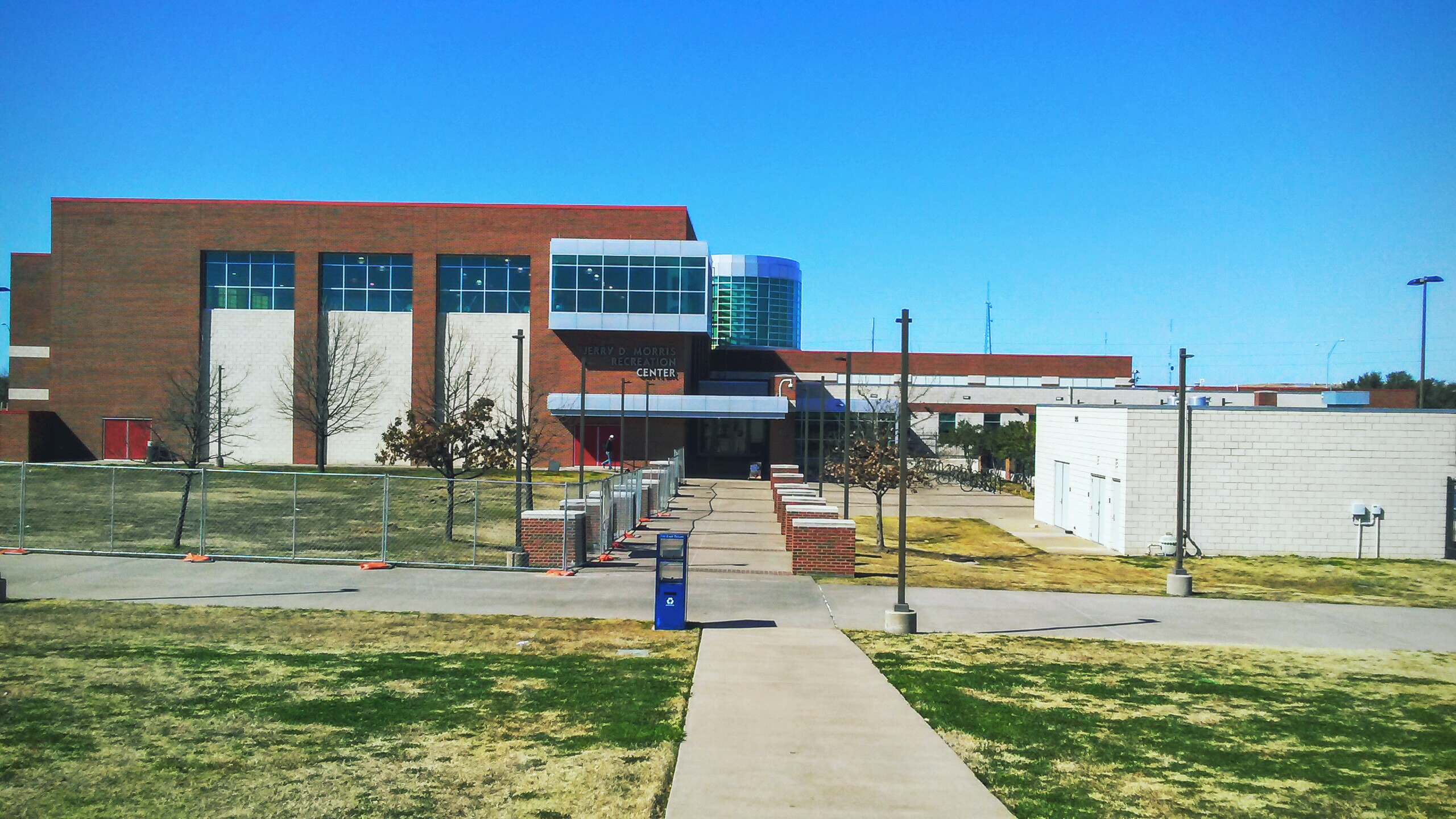
Morris Recreation Center

The Morris Recreation Center (MRC) opened in 2003. The center is named in honor of Jerry D. Morris, who served as the president of the university from 1987 to 1997. The university's intramural sports programs are organized by the staff of the center. The inside of the center features a 45-foot climbing rock, a three-lane jogging track, four racquetball courts, two basketball courts, a large fitness room with cardiovascular and weight equipment, an aerobics room, classrooms, a snack area, and locker rooms. Outside the center are a pool, two basketball courts, and two sand-volleyball courts. An outdoor futsal court is on the grounds of the MRC.

The center also operates the Cain Sports Complex for intramural sports. The complex includes four multipurpose sports fields, multipurpose green space, horseshoe pits, barbecue grills, and picnic tables. Outdoor Adventure operates the rock wall inside the center and the outdoor adventure facilities on the west side of campus. Many trails for hiking are available near the campus for outdoor adventure, as well an 18-hole disc golf course. A challenge course is available on the grounds of Outdoor Adventure.

=== Rayburn Student Center ===
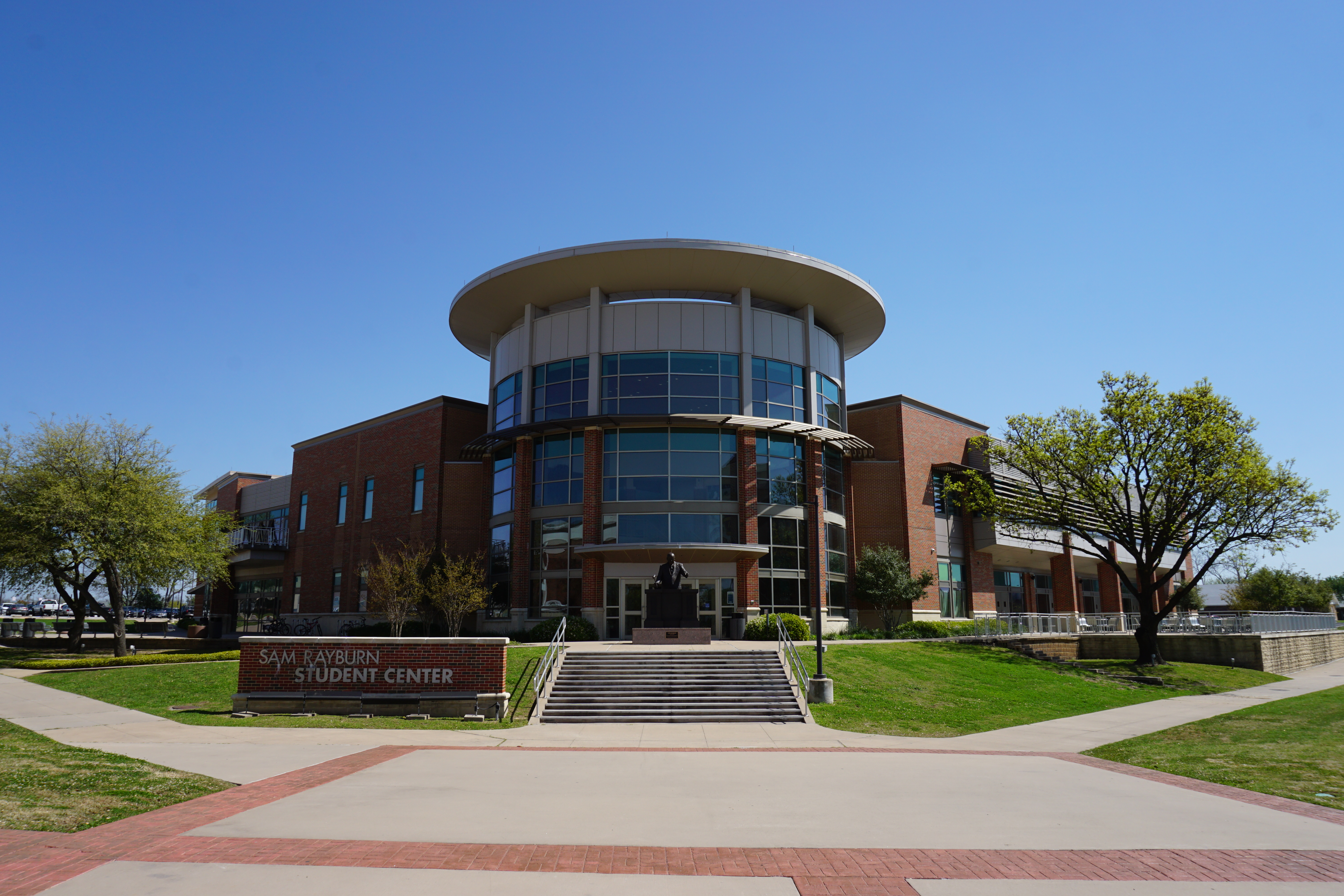
Sam Rayburn Student Center

The Rayburn Student Center (RSC) serves as a focal site for activities and events on campus. Many university organizations are located in the RSC. The RSC also includes the primary student dining facility that was recently improved and expanded. Also, a bookstore located on the first floor of the building offers supplies, school themed spirit merchandise, and other items related to the university. The Club, an entertainment/gathering area, is where various student-oriented events take place. The Club features a drink and snack bar, a game room, and a stage with a panoramic television screen. The RSC is named in honor of the Honorable Sam Rayburn, the longest-tenured Speaker of the United States House of Representatives in U.S. history and a distinguished university alumnus (class of 1903). A statue of Rayburn is situated on the front entry terrace to the RSC standing in a familiar setting in front of the Speaker's rostrum that was an integral part of the House of Representatives legislative chamber in the United States Capitol Building.

== Financials ==
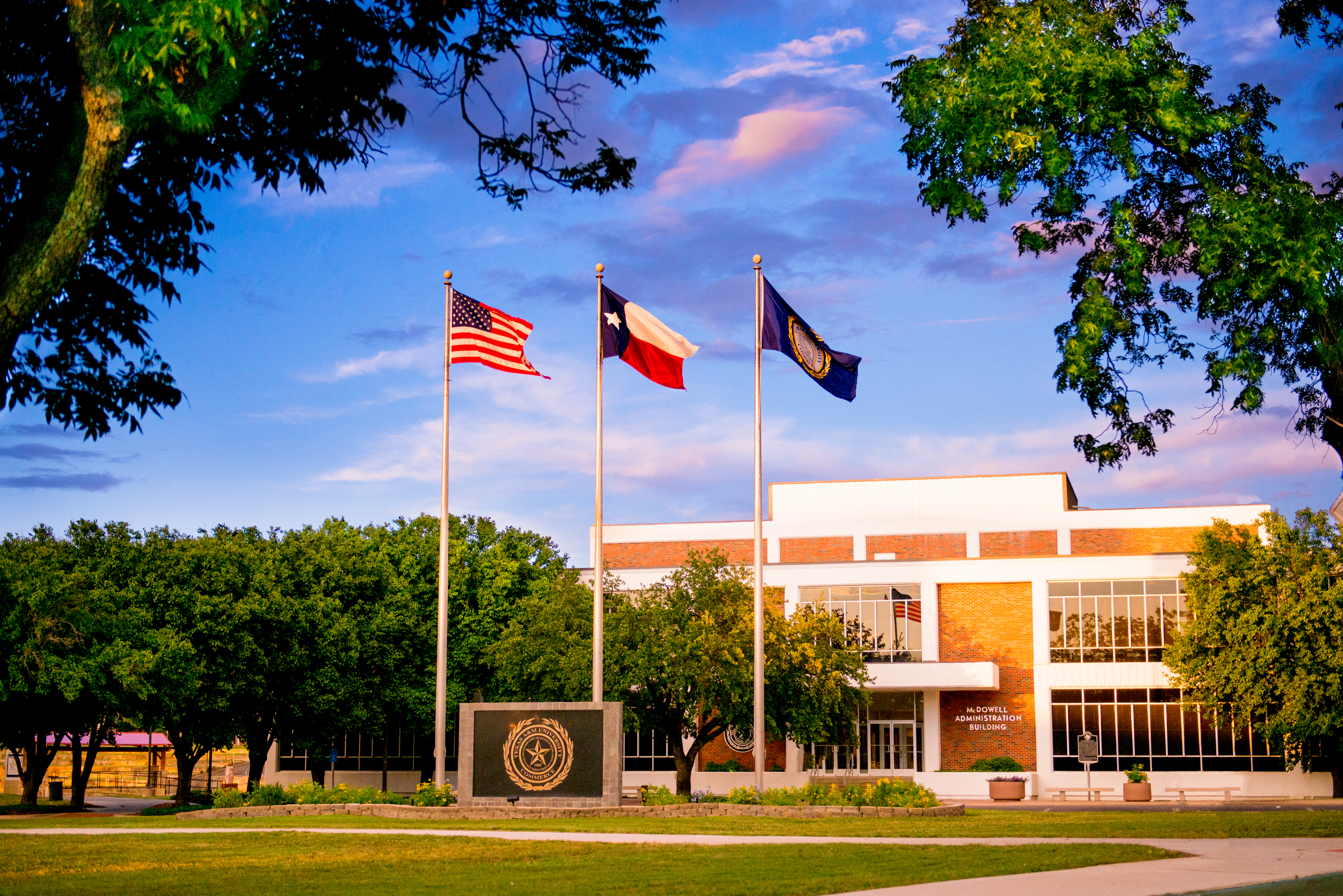
McDowell Administration Building

ETAMU is historically committed to making higher education accessibility affordable to those in need. The university has established an "in tuition" program, allowing students to "lock-in" their incoming freshmen tuition rates for the duration of their undergraduate study, regardless of potential future tuition increases. The university stands as the least expensive research institution in the Dallas–Fort Worth metroplex, as well as one of the least expensive universities in the State of Texas. For the 2014–2015 academic year, in-state tuition rates for freshmen students taking 15 credits each semester typically were about $7000 per year or $236 per credit hour. As of 2019, the university has an endowment of $33 million.

== Student body ==
Located an hour's drive from downtown Dallas, East Texas A&M attracts a majority of its students from the Dallas/Fort Worth Metroplex; as of fall 2016, over 500 students each from Collin, Dallas, Hunt, Rockwall, and Tarrant counties attended the university, but in the last decade, the number of out-of-state students has grown considerably; while nearby Oklahoma, Arkansas, and Louisiana are the most common states of origin, East Texas A&M has attracted a substantial number of students from geographically distant states such as Illinois, Michigan, and Ohio. In recent years, many of the university's student athletes originate from California.

As part of a quality-enhancement plan, the university has focused on diversifying its student body with a goal of becoming a more globally competitive university. As a result, persons from all racial backgrounds and many ethnic groups attend ETAMU. The university has a strong Indian community and a large Korean presence. The institution has also seen a substantive growth in its Nigerian students. In the fall of 2016, international students comprised 6.8% of the student body. In the fall of 2015, the university's acceptance rate was 45%.

=== Demographics ===
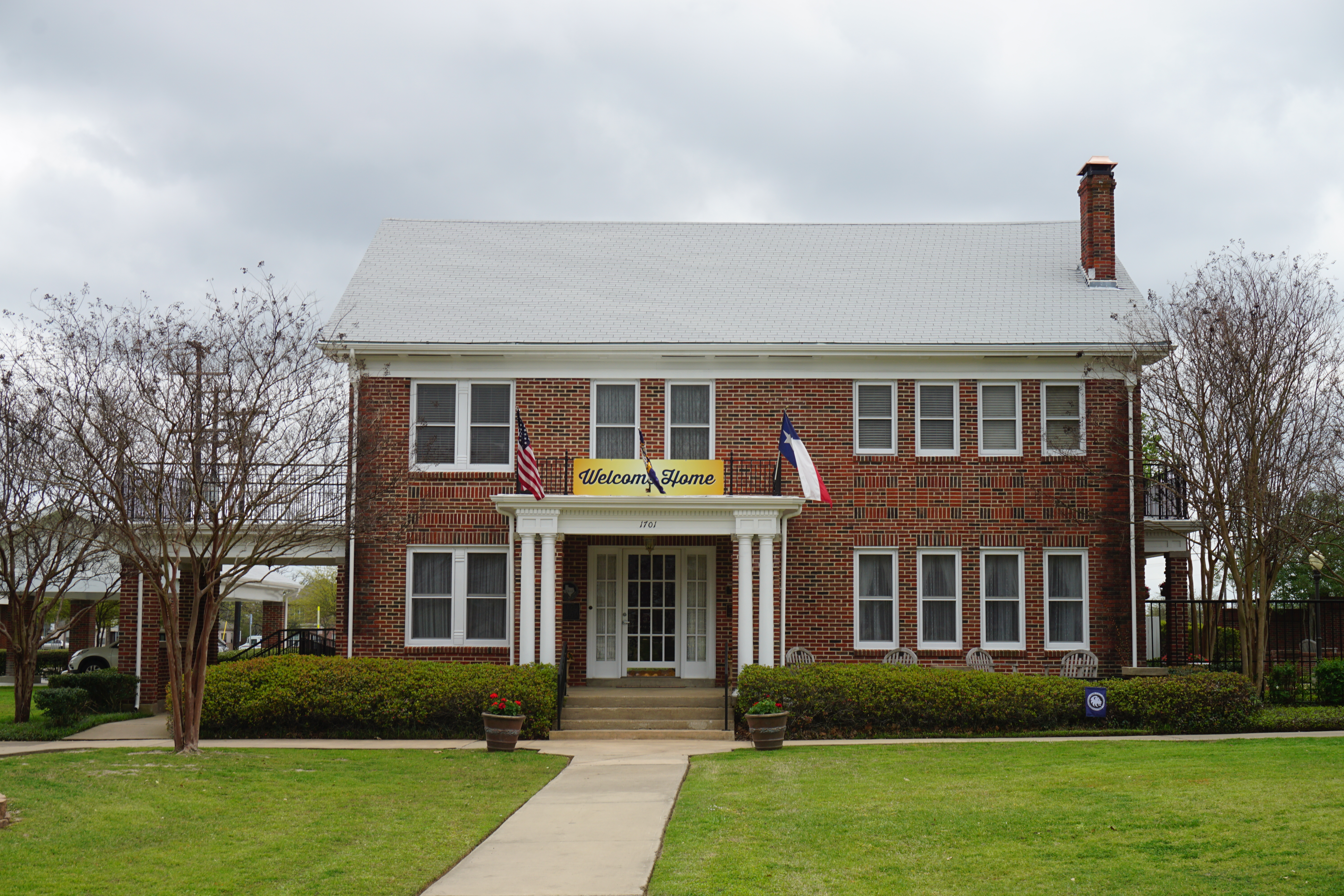
Heritage House (Presidents' residence) on the campus of East Texas A&M

Ranked from highest to lowest.

Gender

- Female: 62.47%
- Male: 37.53%

Race

- White: 43.96%
- Hispanic: 20.65%
- Black or African American: 20.39%
- Asian 2.84%
- International: 5.68%
- Not specified: 1.87%
- Other: 4.62%

Note: Based on fall 2021 enrollment

== Student life ==
Undergraduate demographics as of Fall 2023
Race and ethnicity	Total
White	40%
Hispanic	26%
Black	19%
Unknown	6%
Two or more races	5%
Asian	2%
International student	1%
Economic diversity
Low-income (Note: The percentage of students who received an income-based federal Pell grant intended for low-income students.)	41%
Affluent (Note: The percentage of students who are a part of the American middle class at the bare minimum.)	59%

Due to the growth in student enrollment experienced over the last decade, the university has witnessed a substantial increase in the number of student organizations. Currently, over 150 student groups and organizations are registered on campus. Each year, the various organizations host an array of events to include art displays, cultural shows, dance-offs, concerts, comedy shows, taste fests, poetry readings, and step shows, to name a few.

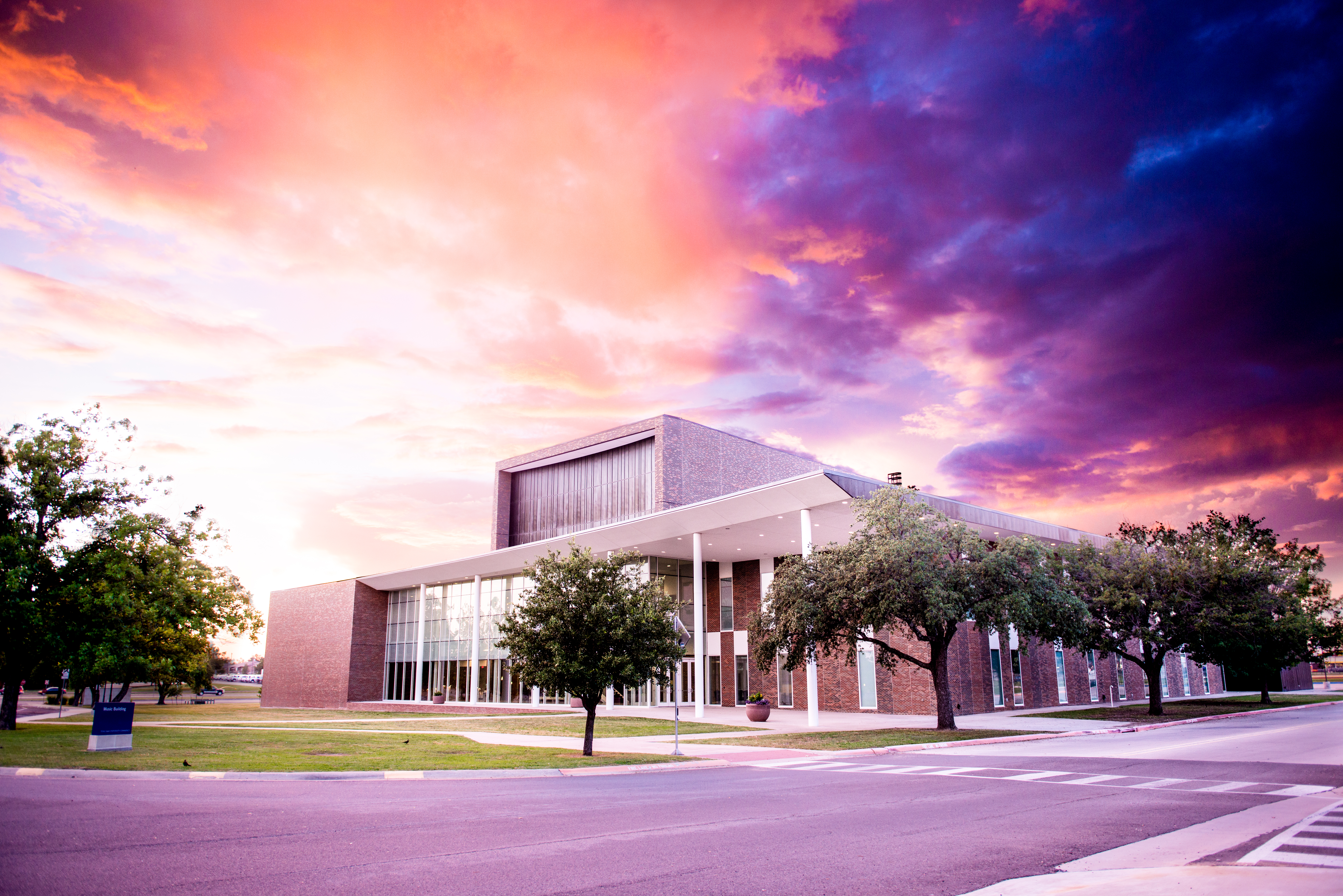
Music Building

Numerous honor societies and scholastic fraternities have members based on major or course of study. Furthermore, social fraternities and sororities are active at East Texas A&M, with 11 registered fraternities and 10 sororities.

Many religious organizations also call the campus home, such as the Baptist Student Ministry, Wesleyan Ministry, Catholic Student Association, Episcopal Student Association, Lions for Christ, Chi Alpha Christian Fellowship, and Muslim Student Association, among others.

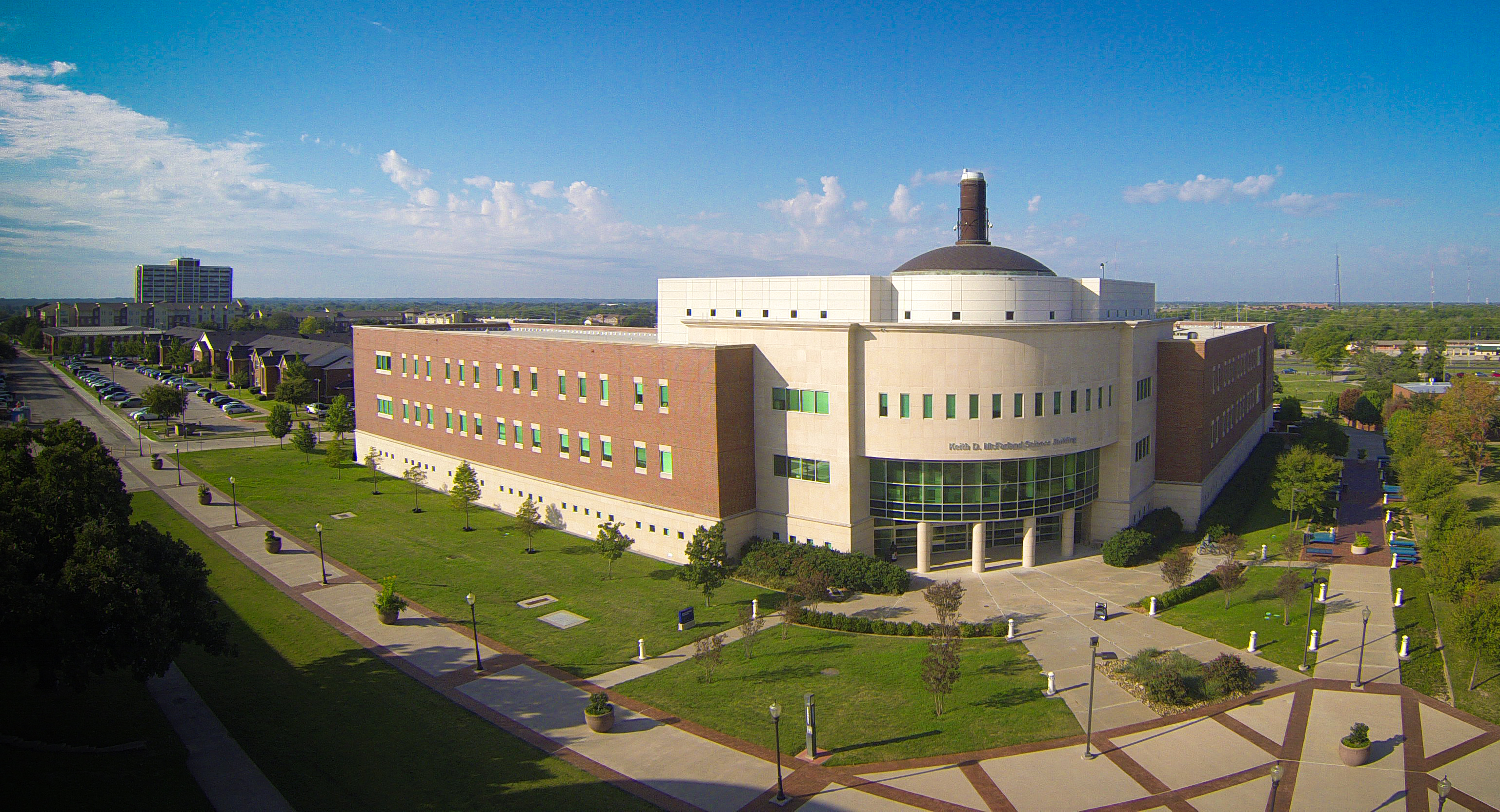
McFarland Science Building

In the state-of-the-art planetarium within the science building, students, faculty and visitors may view movies and astronomical programs on the planetarium ceiling while seated almost fully reclined. The planetarium is considered one of the most significant and modern planetariums on a university campus in the Southwestern United States.

=== Media ===
An FM public radio station, KETR, is licensed through the university. Founded in 1974, KETR serves the communities of Northeast Texas and ETAMU. The station offers a variety format, and broadcasts locally hosted presentations of National Public Radio news programs, Morning Edition and All Things Considered. During middays, KETR broadcasts Notably Texan, a multigenre music program featuring new releases from Texas musicians or music with a Texas connection. KETR also broadcasts ETAMU football and basketball games, as well as football games for Commerce High School.

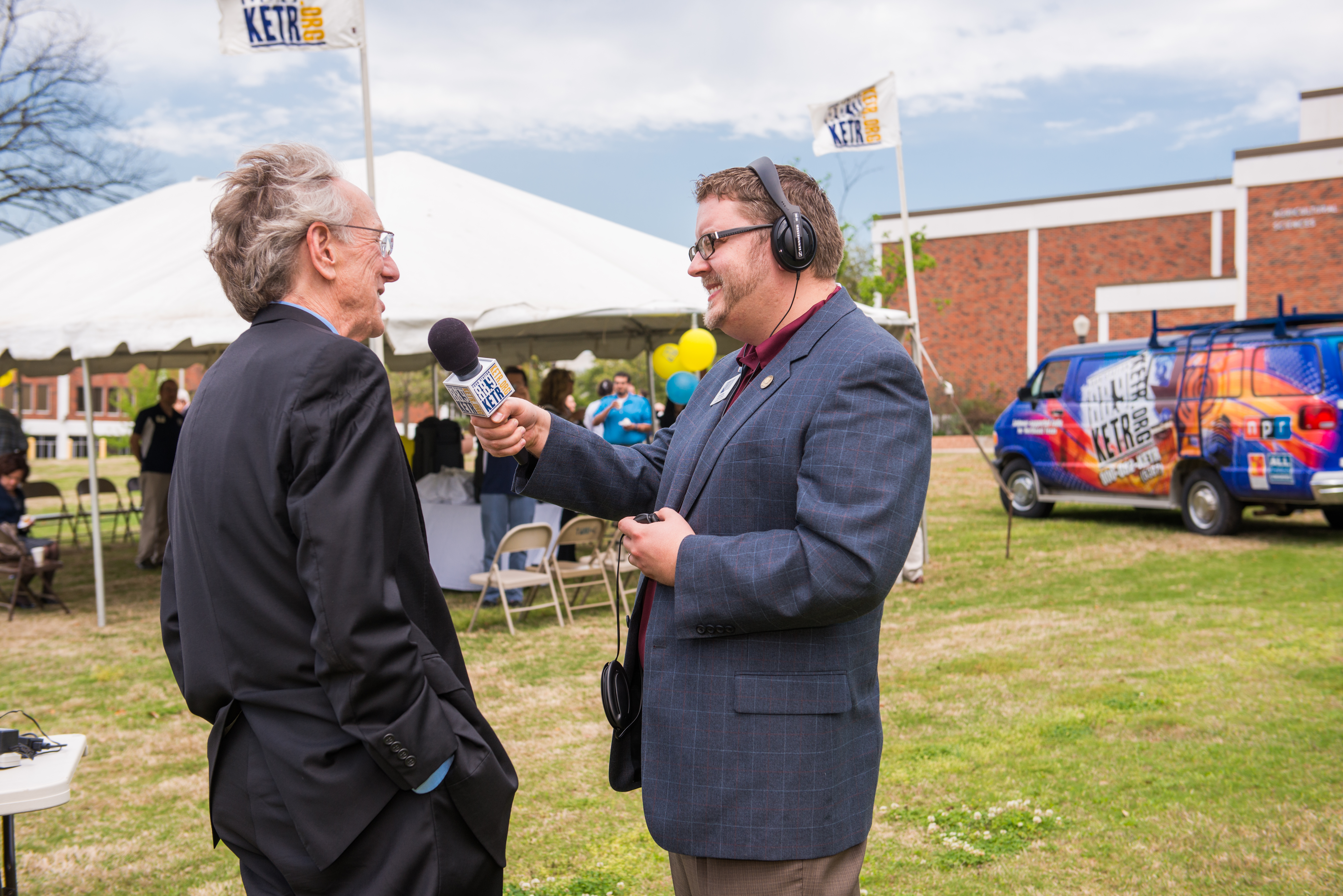
KETR's 40th anniversary celebration in April 2015

The East Texan was the weekly student newspaper for East Texas A&M and was ranked one of the top-10 college newspapers in Texas at the Texas Intercollegiate Press Association (TIPA) meeting in April 2015. Established in 1915, "The East Texan" was one of the oldest student collegiate publications in the nation. The newspaper moved to an online-only format in September 2020 and ceased publication in 2021.

Newscenter 3 is a weekly news broadcast produced by the students of radio and television.

=== Housing and dining services ===
East Texas A&M offers housing to students year round with affordable rates. Every residence hall and campus apartment is coeducational with the exception of F-Halls, which are the women and sorority housing on campus. In an effort to increase the university's student-retention rate, traditional freshmen sign a contract to stay on campus for a minimum of two years or four semesters. Sodexo serves as the student dining vendor for students, with meal plans and at athletic events and a number of catered events on campus throughout the year. The university has shuttle services available to students on campus, to augment student mobility on campus and points nearby.

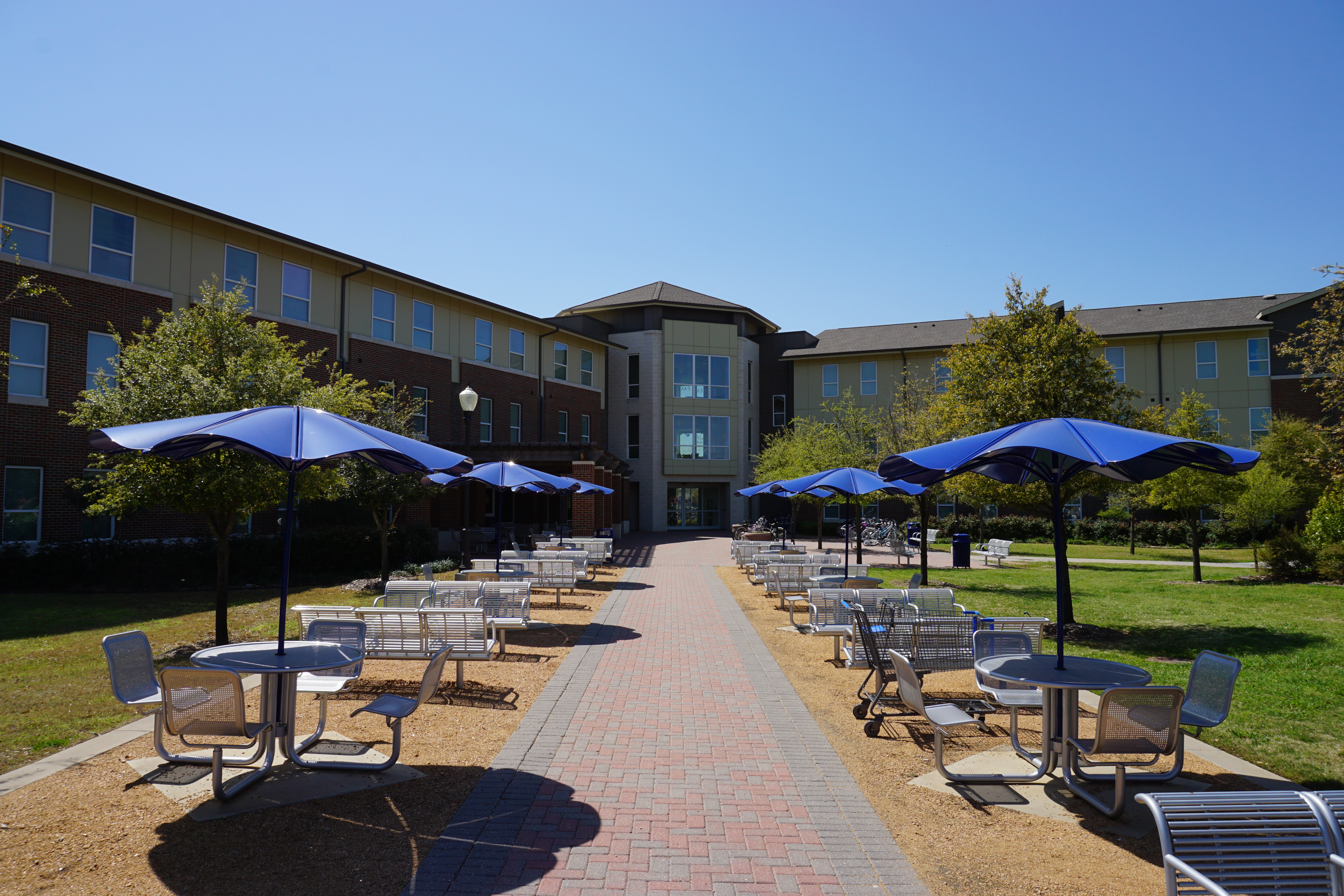
Pride Rock residence hall at East Texas A&M

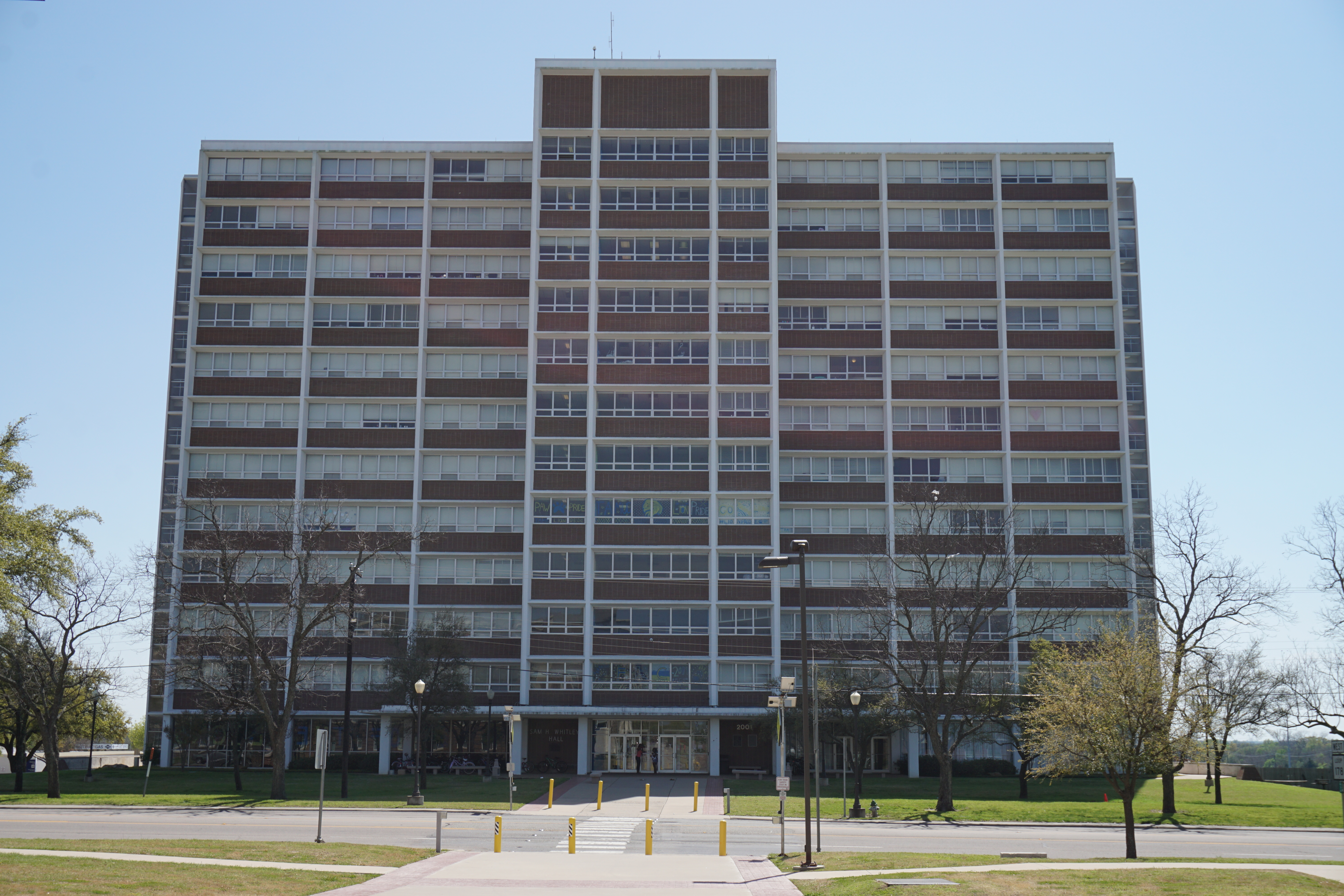
Samuel H. Whitley Hall

- Residence halls
  - Pride Rock
  - Phase II (partially serves Honors College students)
  - Phase III
  - Whitley
- Campus apartments:
  - New Pride
- Other university-operated residences:
  - F-Halls (restricted to sorority housing and living and learning community students)
  - Prairie Crossing (restricted to Honors College students and upperclassmen)

==== Samuel H. Whitley Hall ====
The most visible landmark of the university is Samuel H. Whitley Hall, a 12-story (146-foot-tall) building named after former University President Samuel Whitley (1924–1946). Whitley Hall serves as a dormitory for students residing on campus.

== Athletics ==
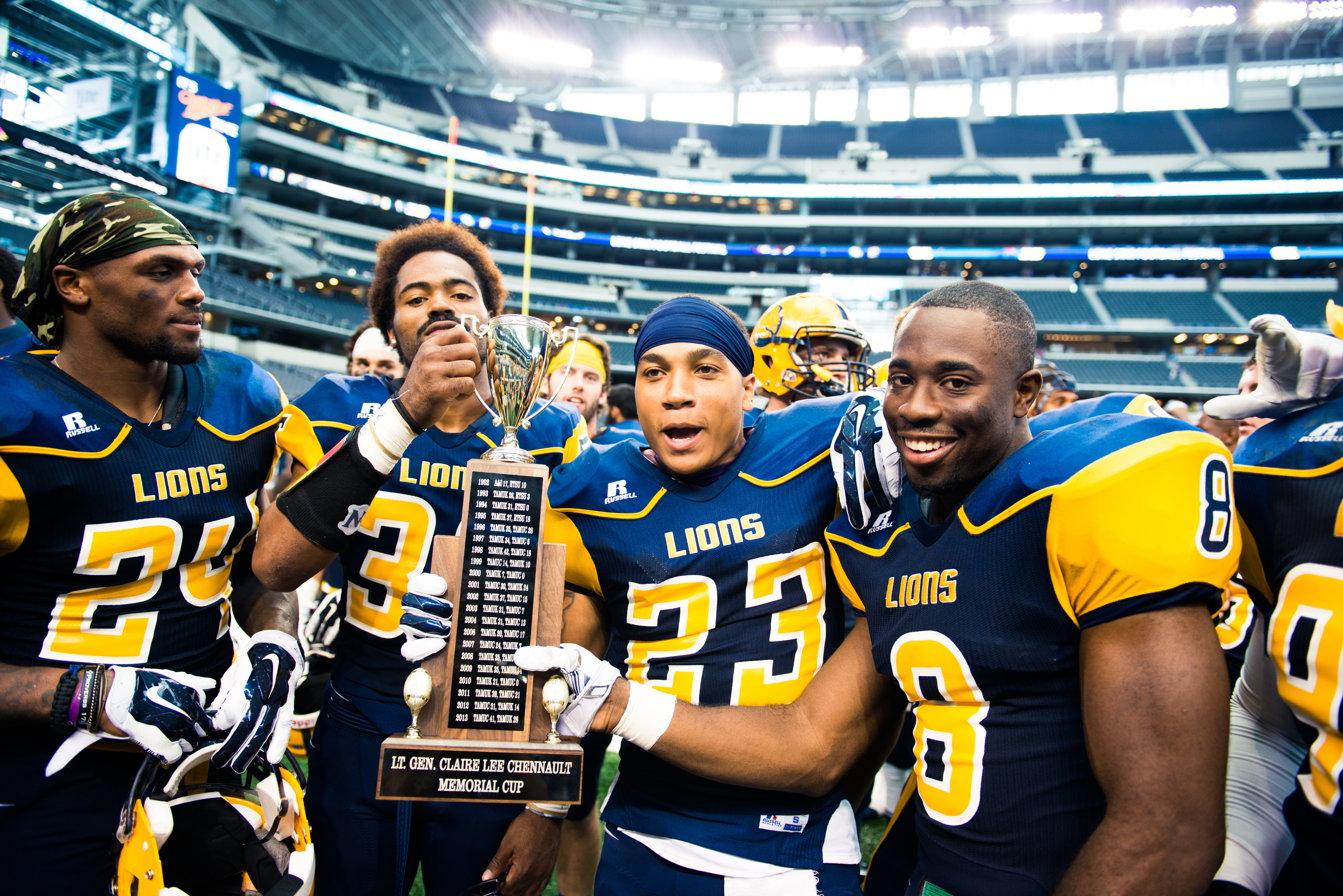
TAMUC football players pose with the Chennault Cup in 2014 after defeating TAMUK in the Lone Star Conference Football Festival.

East Texas A&M (ETAMU) athletic teams are the Lions. The university is a member of the Division I level of the National Collegiate Athletic Association (NCAA), primarily competing in the Southland Conference. Previously, the Lions participated in the Lone Star Conference (LSC) from 1931–32 academic year until the 2021–22 season.

East Texas A&M competes in 12 intercollegiate varsity sports: Men's sports include basketball, cross country, football, golf and track & field; while women's sports include basketball, cross country, golf, soccer, softball, track & field and volleyball.

=== Accomplishments ===
East Texas A&M has won two national football championships; 2017 NCAA Division II Championship and 1972 NAIA Championship. They also won the national championship as members of the NAIA in men's basketball during the 1954–55 season, men's team golf in 1965, and men's team tennis in 1972 and 1978. Additionally, several track and field athletes have won individual national championships as recently as 2019.

== Alumni association ==
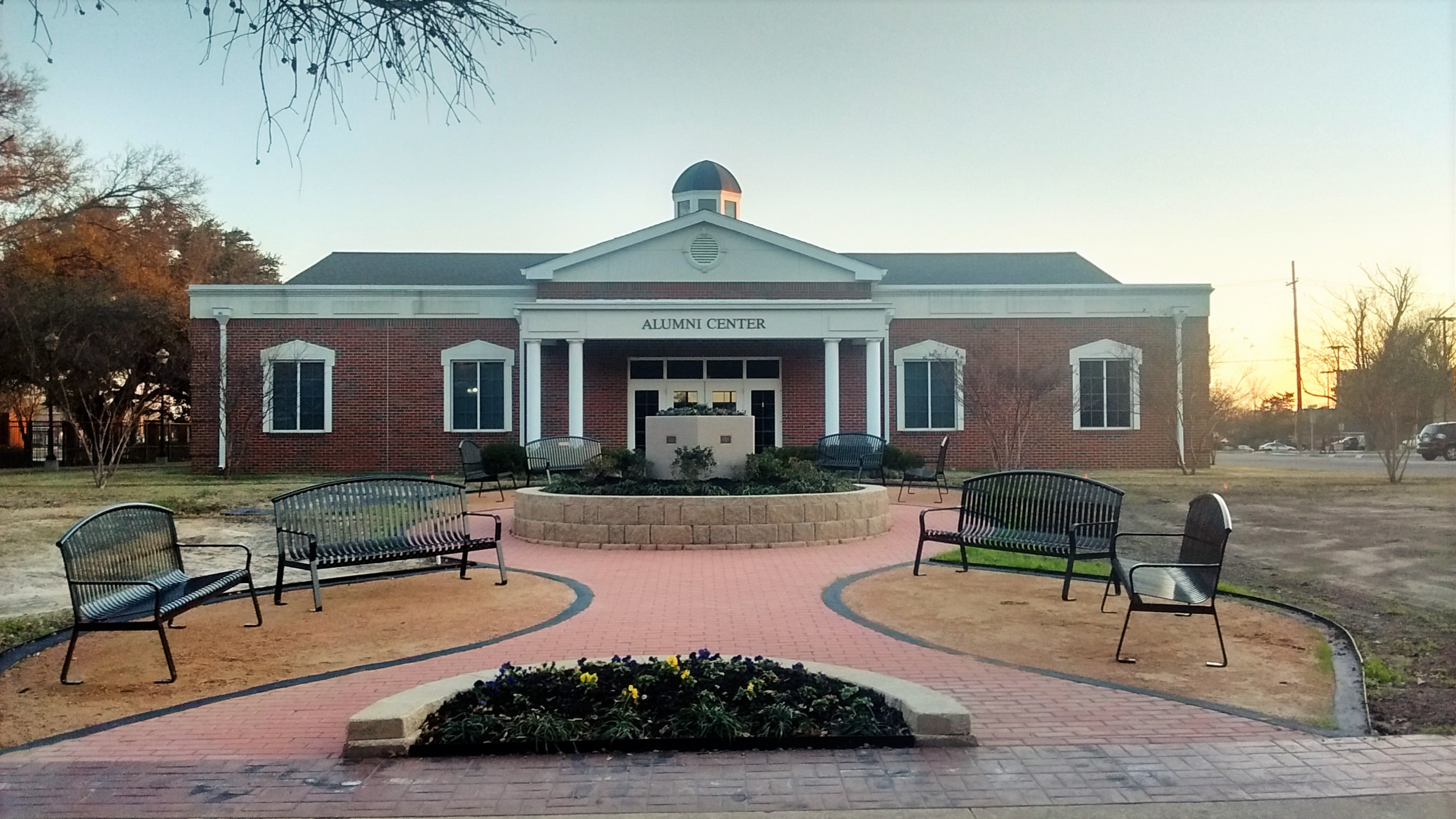
The Alumni Center at ETAMU

The alumni association for East Texas A&M, having been organized only one year after the founding of the university in 1890 and called the Alumnal Association at that time, now serves as a liaison between the university and over 100,000 alumni and friends. Each year, the nonprofit organization hosts various workshops, seminars, and other events designed to advance the mission and membership of the Association in addition to programs with the purpose of enhancing job prospects of ETAMU students and graduates. The East Texas A&M Alumni Association is housed in the new Alumni Center completed in 2009.

== Notable alumni and faculty ==
- List of East Texas A&M University people
