= KETR =

Radio station in Commerce, Texas

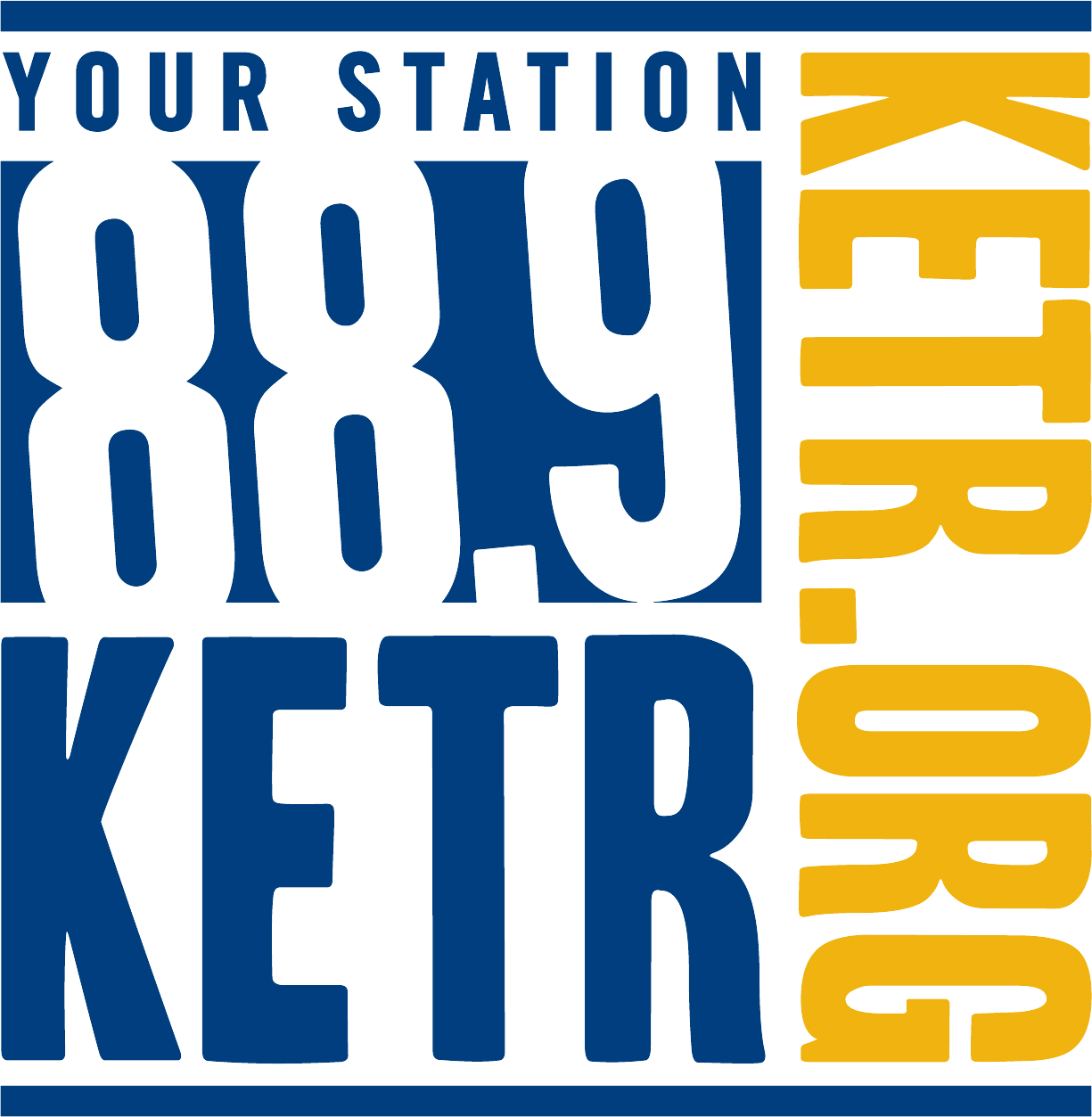
- Commerce, Texas; United States
- Frequency: 88.9 MHz (HD Radio)

Programming
- Format: Public radio
- Subchannels: HD2: Adult album alternative "XPoNential Radio"; HD3: Spanish variety "Radio Bilingüe"
- Affiliations: NPR; American Public Media; Associated Press

Ownership
- Owner: East Texas A&M University; (The Texas A&M University System Board of Regents)

History
- First air date: April 8, 1975; 51 years ago
- Call sign meaning: East Texas Radio (taken from East Texas State University, the former name of East Texas A&M University)

Technical information
- Licensing authority: FCC
- Facility ID: 18260
- Class: C1
- ERP: 100,000 watts
- HAAT: 116 meters
- Transmitter coordinates: 33°14′17″N 95°55′27″W

Links
- Public license information: Public file; LMS
- Website: ketr.org

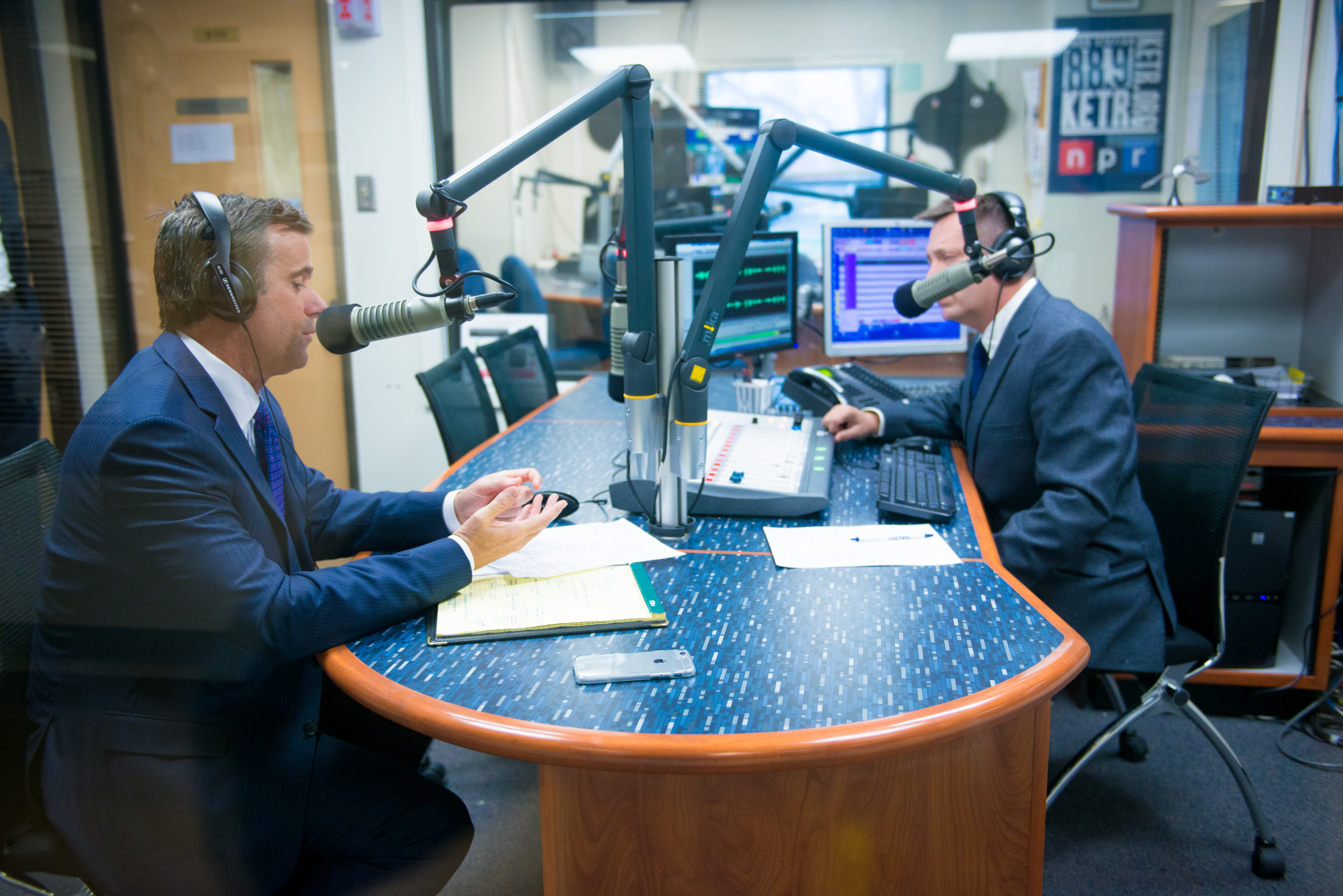
John Ratcliffe during an interview at KETR in February 2015

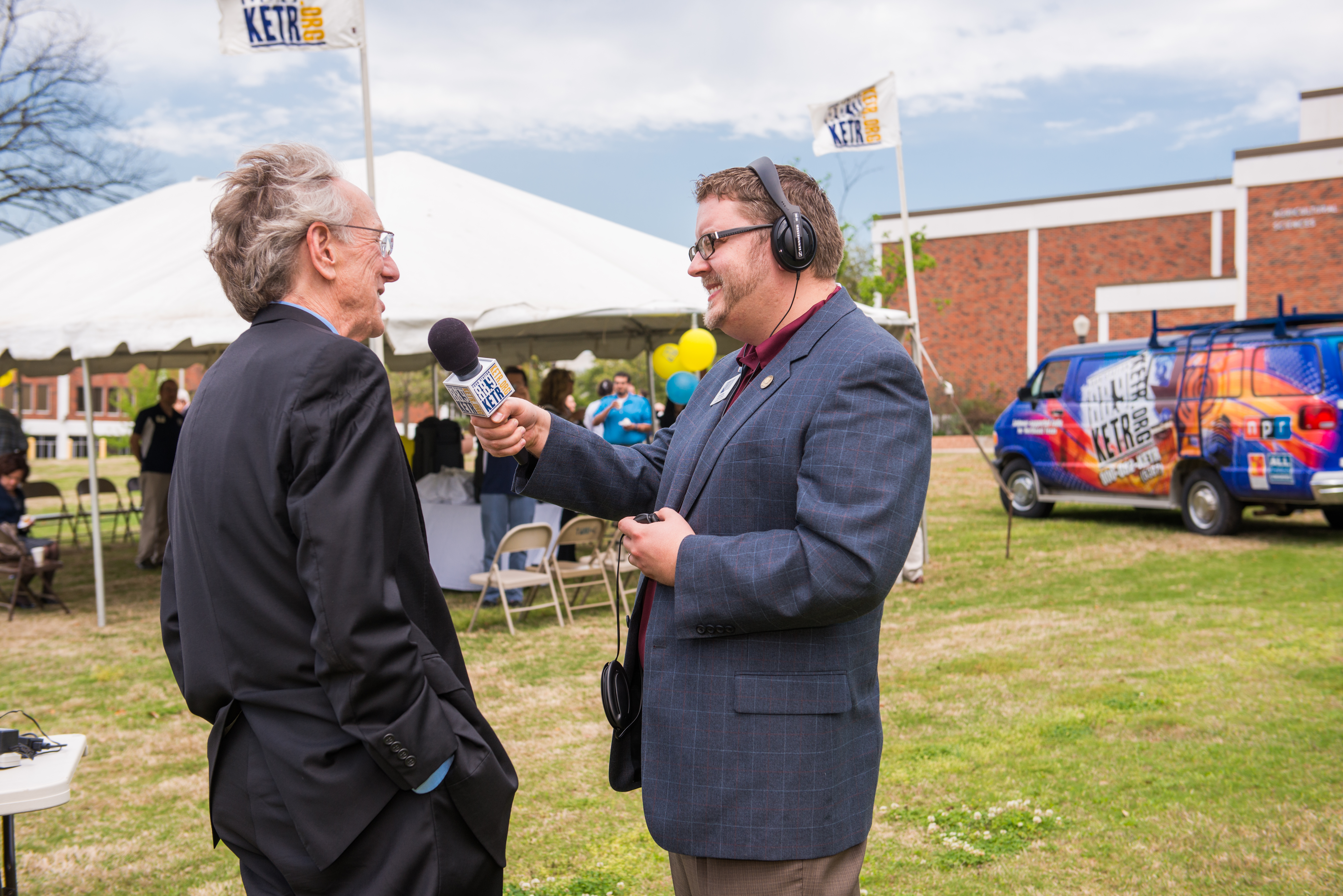
KETR's 40th anniversary celebration in April 2015

KETR (88.9 FM) is a non-commercial broadcast radio station operating in Commerce, Texas, licensed to East Texas A&M University. A member of the National Public Radio network, the station serves nearly 250,000 Northeast Texas homes. The staff is composed of radio professionals and East Texas A&M students who major in either journalism or mass communication studies. KETR also produces original long-form and short-form radio programming.

== History ==
KETR began in the early 1970s as the director of the East Texas State University radio-television program, Dr. David Rigney, developed an FCC application for an FM station that would be a teaching laboratory for students. KETR's first broadcast went on the air on April 7, 1975. The station operated in a former classroom on the first floor of the Journalism Building, with Phil Ebensberger, a veteran Texas commercial radio broadcaster, as general manager and morning-show host. The weekday programming originally emphasized local news, information, and middle-of-the-road music from early-morning sign-on to early afternoon; classical music in the early afternoon (this was soon replaced by jazz); National Public Radio's All Things Considered in the late afternoon; various public affairs programs in the early evening, including live broadcasts of Commerce City Commission meetings; and Freeform, a student-hosted rock music program from 9 pm to midnight. Weekend programs predominantly featured classical music or opera, such as the long-running Texaco Metropolitan Opera broadcasts.

In 1977, the station moved from its quarters in the Journalism Building to new studios in the Performing Arts Center, where it shared facilities with the Radio-TV program. KETR remained in the Performing Arts Center until it moved to new facilities in Binnion Hall in 2008. In the early 1980s, after Ebensberger departed, general manager Bill Oellermann obtained FCC approval and a grant to raise KETR's tower height and to increase power from about 10,000 watts to 100,000 watts. This increased the station's broadcast range from about 20 miles to 75 miles. After moving away from National Public Radio programming in the mid-1980s, KETR once again features All Things Considered and Morning Edition, among other NPR programs. KETR was one of the original stations carrying Morning Edition when it debuted in 1979.

== Local programs ==
KETR has several programs that focus on Commerce and the Northeast Texas area. Counties that are typically covered with local news in addition to Hunt County, where Commerce is located, are neighboring Rockwall, Collin, Fannin, Hopkins, Delta, and Rains Counties.

Among the local shows are:

- Notably Texan is focused on Texas music and Texas musicians with host Matt Meinke.
- North by Northeast is a weekly call-in show presenting "Stories that matter to Northeast Texas". Topics include development, education, health care, the environment, and the economy. Sports and fine arts are also featured.
- Outdoors With Luke Clayton, hosted by Hunter and Angler Luke Clayton, focuses on hunting, angling, and outdoor activity.
- Buried is a podcast created by host/reporter George Hale and KETR General Manager Jerrod Knight, a documentary-style podcast that uncovers details about the case of Carey Mae Parker, a young rural-Texas mother of three who disappeared 19 years before being reported missing.

== National and other nonlocal programs ==
- Morning Edition
- All Things Considered
- BBC World Service
- Sunday Baroque
- TED Radio Hour
- Texas Standard
- Texas Matters
- Bullseye with Jesse Thorn

== Sports programming ==
KETR sports programming began in the fall of 1975, with student-produced broadcasts of Commerce High School Tigers football. Ebensberger and former ETSU All-American quarterback Sam McCord served as the voices of ETSU Lions football. The first Commerce Tigers broadcast featured the Tigers playing at rival Honey Grove, with future ETSU All-American and NFL quarterback Wade Wilson leading the Commerce offense. The first college football broadcast was the Lions’ 42–10 win over Prairie View A&M in the Cotton Bowl. KETR also broadcast Commerce Tigers basketball and A&M-Commerce Lion basketball, continuing to this day. KETR followed the Lions to NAIA basketball tournament appearances in Kansas City in 1977 and 1978. KETR serves as the flagship station for the Lion Sports Network. The station covers Texas A&M-Commerce football, A&M-Commerce men's and women's basketball, and Commerce High School football. Longtime Texas sports Broadcaster Charlie Chitwood serves as play-by-play announcer and TAMUC alumnus Brock Callaway provides color commentary.

== Station coverage ==
The station is typically received well in an 80-mile radius in all directions. The station's signal can easily be heard west to Dallas, north into Hugo, Oklahoma, southeast to Canton, Texas, and east to Mount Vernon. The quality of the signal can sometimes be affected by topographical anomalies such as lakes or hills; areas north and west are typically not affected due to the generally flat topography. Too, the signal is simulcast globally via online stream at the station's website, which is accessible on most internet-connected devices.

== HD Radio ==
KETR launched HD Radio operations in July 2023, including a HD2 sub-channel called "The Lion" devoted to 24/7 Triple-A (adult album alternative) music playlist which is provided by XPoNential Radio.
