= List of East Texas A&M University people =

The following is a list of notable people associated with East Texas A&M University, formerly Texas A&M University–Commerce, located in the American city of Commerce, Texas.

== Notable alumni ==
=== Politics and government ===
- Lindley Beckworth – former judge of United States Customs Court
- Mary Lou Bruner – Republican candidate for a seat on the Texas State Board of Education; received a master's degree in Special Ed. from the Commerce campus (when it was called East Texas State University)
- Lanell Cofer – former politician and lawyer
- Mike Conaway – Republican member of the United States House of Representatives from Texas's 11th congressional district
- Phil Dyer – former mayor of Plano, Texas
- Marsha Farney (formerly Marsha Gonyaw) – Republican member of the Texas House of Representatives from Williamson County; received bachelor's and master's degrees in professional education from the Commerce campus in the early 1990s
- Brady P. Gentry – former politician
- Jimmy Hickey Jr. – Republican member of the Arkansas State Senate from Texarkana, Arkansas; obtained Bachelor of Business Administration from the Texarkana campus
- Justin Holland – Member of the Texas House of Representatives from the 33rd district
- Alphonso Jackson – former secretary of Housing and Urban Development under U.S. President George W. Bush
- Tom Price – judge of the Texas Court of Criminal Appeals, 1997–2015
- Sam Rayburn – Democratic representative for Texas's 4th congressional district and long-term Speaker of the United States House of Representatives
- Sam W. Russell – former lawyer and politician
- Hilda G. Tagle – senior judge of the United States District Court for the Southern District of Texas
- Jimmy Turman – former politician and educator, served in the Texas House of Representatives and also was speaker of the house until 1963
- Gary VanDeaver – former school superintendent for the New Boston Independent School District and incoming Republican member of the Texas House of Representatives; received doctorate in education from TAMU-Commerce

=== Media and arts ===
- Duane Allen – lead singer of The Oak Ridge Boys
- Tia Ballard – actress for Funimation Entertainment
- Linda Brookover – screenwriter, film producer, essayist on film topics
- Will Creedle – novelist and thought leader in the field of website ADA compliance
- Jim Fiscus – photographer specializing in editorial and advertising photography, including several campaigns for the Showtime series Dexter
- Morgan Garrett – voice actress
- Adrian Hall – former theater director
- Trenton Doyle Hancock – fine artist
- Colleen Hoover – New York Times bestselling author
- Sheryl Leach – author and co-creator of Barney & Friends
- Staley T. McBrayer – newspaper publisher and inventor of the Vanguard web offset press for newspaper printing
- John Charles Norman – advertising executive and graphic designer, chief creative officer, TBWA Chiat Day, Los Angeles
- Bill O'Neal – author who has written more than 30 books and 300 articles and book reviews on the American West
- Robyn O'Neil – artist known for large-scale graphite on paper drawings
- William A. Owens – author, folklorist and educator
- Gary Panter – illustrator and set designer of Pee Wee's Playhouse
- Jeff Parrott – painter
- Key Poulan – composer
- Michael Sampson – New York Times best-selling author
- Michael Schwab – graphic designer and illustrator, attended 1970–1972
- Mark Seliger – photographer noted for his portraiture; regular front-page photographer for Rolling Stone, where he began working in 1987
- Jordan Randall Smith – founder and music director of Symphony Number One
- Erin Trieb – photographer
- Lester Van Winkle – sculptor
- Renée Witterstaetter – comic book colorist, editor, and writer
- Ralph C. Wood – scholar of theology and English literature
- Susan Wood – poet
- John Clifton Wright – author

=== Athletes and coaches ===
- Autry Beamon – former NFL player
- Bobby Bounds – former Arena League Football player
- Chad Brown – NFL official, refereed Super Bowls XXXV and XLV
- Marv Brown – former Detroit Lion
- Curtis Buckley – former NFL player
- Althea Byfield – former professional basketball player and netball bronze medal winner for Jamaica
- John Carlos – former sprinter; professional football player; human rights activist
- Bob Carpenter – former NBA player
- Jake Carter – former NBA player
- Rob Childress – former college baseball coach at Texas A&M
- Tim Collier – former NFL cornerback
- Ricky Collins – former CFL wide receiver
- Derrick Crawford – former Arena Football League player
- Will Cureton – former starting quarterback for the Cleveland Browns
- Clint Dolezel – former Arena Football League all-star quarterback; head coach for the Philadelphia Soul in the AFL
- Buck Fausett – former MLB player
- Harry Fritz – former professional tennis player, also was a member of East Texas State's men's tennis team that won the 1972 NAIA National championship
- Bill Gaines – former professional basketball player
- Jon Gilliam – former Kansas City Chiefs player, played in Super Bowl I
- Ernest Hawkins – Winningest football coach in Texas A&M-Commerce athletic history, also lead the team an NAIA National Championship title in 1972
- Scott Highsmith – football coach currently serving as an offensive analyst for Southern Miss, previously served as head coach at Belhaven and East Texas Baptist
- Ross Hodge – current head coach for the West Virginia men's basketball team
- Rich Houston – American football player
- Lee Johnson – former NBA player
- Vernon Johnson – former professional football player
- Bo Kelly – former Arena League Football player for the Arizona Rattlers
- Kader Kohou – Ivorian NFL cornerback for the Miami Dolphins
- John Lotz – former men's basketball coach at Florida
- Dee Mackey – former NFL player for the San Francisco 49ers
- Kyle Mackey – former NFL quarterback for the New York Jets and Miami Dolphins
- Harvey Martin – former defensive end in the National Football League and Super Bowl XII MVP
- Danny Mason – current CFL Defensive End for the Ottawa RedBlacks
- Kevin Mathis – former starting cornerback for the Super Bowl Champion Dallas Cowboys
- Durwood Merrill – former MLB umpire
- Shelby Metcalf – former head coach of men's basketball at Texas A&M
- Mike Miller – former head coach of the Eastern Illinois Panthers men's basketball team, current assistant coach for the Washington Wizards
- Larry Nemmers – former NFL official
- Rex Norris – former defensive coordinator at the University of Oklahoma
- John Pearce – former football coach at Stephen F. Austin State University
- Luis Perez – quarterback for the Arlington Renegades of the XFL
- Dave Philley – former MLB player
- Ron Poe – former high school football coach, one of the winningest high school football coaches in Texas history and state champion in 1979
- Herb Raybourn – former MLB player, scout, and New York Yankees director of Latin American Operations
- Bryn Roy – professional Canadian football player
- Wes Smith – former NFL player for the Green Bay Packers
- Aundra Thompson – former NFL player for the Green Bay Packers
- Michael Trigg – former ArenaBowl-winning player and head coach
- Charles Tuaau – former professional football player
- Darrell Tully – former NFL player; superintendent of schools at Spring Branch ISD in the Houston area
- Alan Veingrad – NFL football player
- Devondrick Walker – professional European basketball player
- Sam Walton – NFL football player
- Kaliesha West – boxer and International Women's Boxing Hall of Fame inductee
- Curtis Wester – former Canadian Football League player
- Dwight White – Hall of Fame NFL player for the Pittsburgh Steelers, Super Bowl Champion
- Darrell Williams – former professional basketball player
- Antonio Wilson – former professional football player for the Minnesota Vikings and the Edmonton Eskimos of the Canadian Football League
- Wade Wilson – former NFL quarterback

=== Military personnel ===
- Chris Adams – United States Air Force officer and author

=== Other ===
- Ali Abdullah Al-Daffa – mathematician and scientist
- Mark Busby – professor of English at Texas State University
- T. Don Hutto – co-founder of Corrections Corporation of America (CCA)
- Ronny Woodruff – biologist and zoologist

== See also ==
- List of people from Texas
- Texas A&M University-Commerce
