= History of East Texas State University =

Early history of Texas A&M University–Commerce

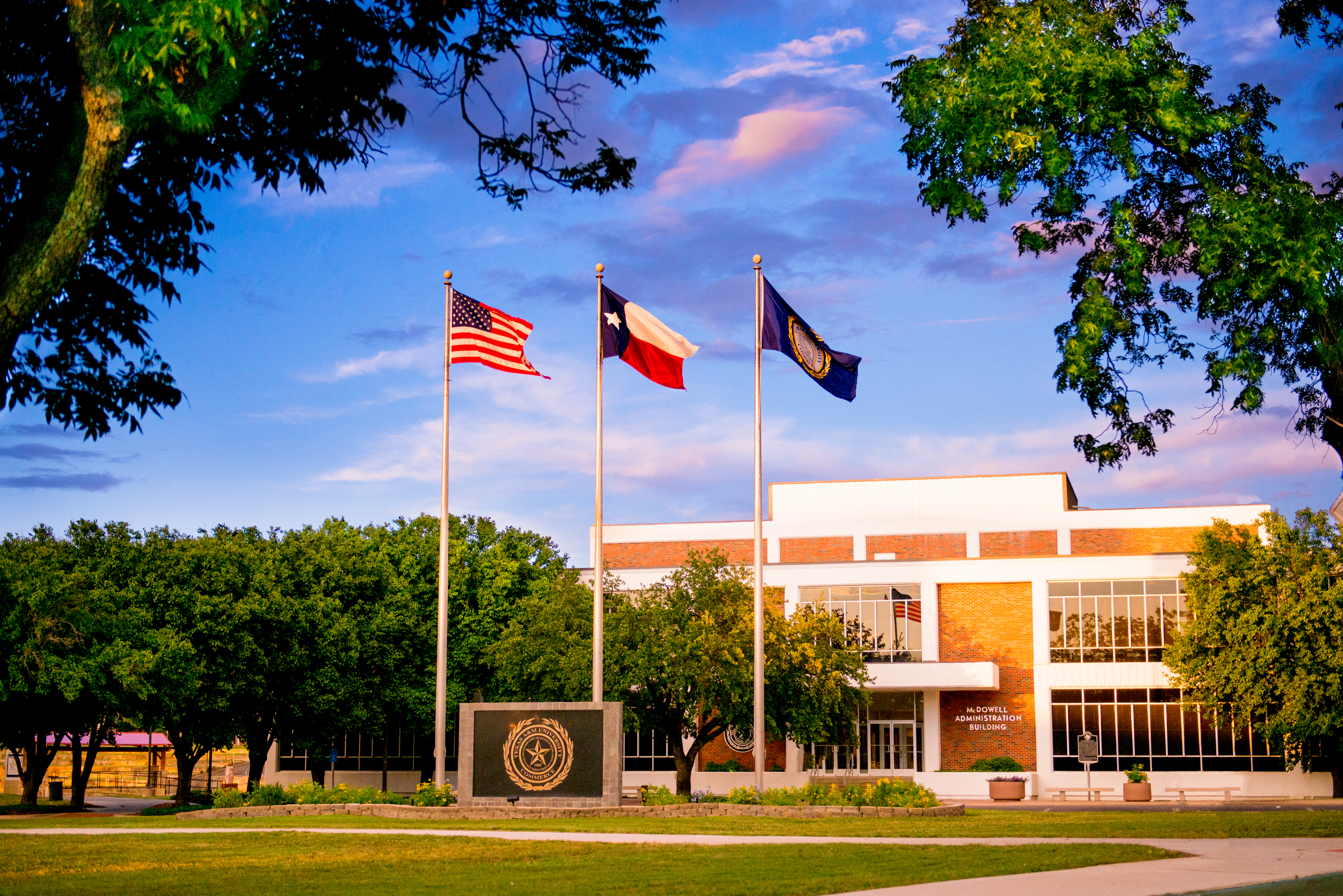
The McDowell Business Administration Building, built during the presidency of D. Whitney Halladay

The history of East Texas State University (ETSU) comprises the history of the university now known as East Texas A&M University from its renaming as East Texas State University in 1965 (after the establishment of its first doctoral program) to its admission into the Texas A&M University System and renaming as Texas A&M University–Commerce in 1996. During this era, ETSU was led by five different presidents: James Gilliam Gee, D. Whitney Halladay, F. H. "Bub" McDowell, Charles J. Austin, and Jerry Morris. The ETSU period witnessed substantial swings in student enrollment, which grew from 8,890 in 1968 to 9,981 in 1975 before falling to 6,867 in 1985 and partially recovering to 8,000 in 1992. The university's physical plant expanded steadily throughout the period, from 87 buildings on 150 acres (61 ha) valued at $19 million in 1965 to a campus spanning 1,883 acres (762 ha) worth approximately $150 million by the 1990s.

Major structural changes to the university during the ETSU era included the creation of a separate ETSU board of regents in 1969 and the approval to open a branch campus in Texarkana in April 1971. While at times accused of cronyism and wasteful spending, the university administration pursued innovative programs that provided counseling and tutoring to disabled and minority students, supported disadvantaged local minority high school students, and joined consortia such as the Federation of North Texas Area Universities. The administration first lowered ETSU's academic standards for admission before raising them in successive efforts to end its enrollment crisis. The most serious threat to face ETSU stemmed from the economic downturn in Texas in the mid-1980s, which led to proposals to close the school entirely before a bus trip with 450 supporters trekked to the State Capitol in a show of support that ultimately secured the school's continued existence.

As the student body shrank in size in the late 1970s and early 1980s, however, it became increasingly diverse as older non-traditional students, minority students, and international students all grew in numbers. Through the African-American Student Society at East Texas (ASSET), the university's African American students advocated their demands for equal treatment in housing, course offerings in African American history and literature, and the employment of African American faculty members. Their efforts ultimately resulted in the first African American faculty member and administrator being hired in 1968 and 1972, respectively. Similarly, the proportion of female faculty members grew from 20% in 1975 to almost 26% in 1990, and the first woman to hold a high-level academic office was promoted in 1987.

ETSU's Five Star Series brought many prestigious artists and creative minds to campus, including author Alex Haley as well as actors Larry Linville and Vincent Price. Its Sam Rayburn Symposium likewise featured prominent politicians and scholars, including Lady Bird Johnson, former Speaker of the United States House of Representatives John William McCormack, Congressman Ray Roberts, and Speaker of the House Jim Wright. The football team won the NAIA national championship in 1972, while Lion football players such as Autry Beamon, Harvey Martin, Dwight White, and Wade Wilson went on to star in the National Football League (NFL). The men's tennis team won the 1972 and 1978 NAIA national championships, while future Olympian John Carlos competed for the men's track team in 1966–67. After the passage of Title IX in 1972, ETSU fielded women's teams in basketball, tennis, track, and volleyball, with the volleyball team achieving the most success during the period.

== Continued growth ==
East Texas State College (ETSC) was renamed East Texas State University (ETSU) with authorization from the Texas Legislature in 1965, after it began its first doctoral program in 1962. ETSU was also reorganized into three schools at this point, one each for the arts and sciences, education, and its graduate program. In 1965, the main ETSU campus included 87 buildings on 150 acres (61 ha), while its college farm spanned 1,052 acres (426 ha) and consisted of 25 buildings. That year the total value of the physical plant was $19 million, compared to $2.328 million in 1947 and $175,000 in 1917. The university's budget for 1965 totaled $6 million, which funded 25 academic departments offering 69 undergraduate majors and 30 specializations for master's degrees.

After President James G. Gee retired in 1966, he was replaced by D. Whitney Halladay, a native Californian who was educated at Claremont College and Columbia University. He served in the United States Army during World War II and the Korean War and worked for the University of Arkansas as its dean of students starting in 1955. Enrollment growth continued during the first years of the ETSU era, albeit at a slower rate: it slowly tailed off from 28% in 1965 to 6.74% in 1968, when total enrollment reached 8,890. Despite this trend of slowing growth and national factors such as the declining overall birthrate, the newly established Texas College Coordinating Board predicted that ETSU's fall 1971 enrollment would reach 12,200, a prognostication that Halladay "fully accepted".

The projected growth encouraged expansion and reorganization of the university's administration in the late 1960s, most notably the creation of the College of Business in 1968, which joined the two extant academic colleges: Arts and Sciences, and Education. The next year, the Texas Legislature established a separate ETSU board of regents when it passed House Bill 242, which historian Donald E. Reynolds termed the "most important administrative change" because it allowed the university to "pursue goals tailor-made for [its] best interests". In 1969, the Department of Social Sciences was split into two new departments: the Department of Political Science and the Department of Sociology/Anthropology. 1971 witnessed the creation of the Department of Computer Science, a discipline previously taught in the Department of Mathematics. ETSU's bachelor's degree in the field was the first offered anywhere in Texas.

The ETSU Foundation and the Office of Alumni Affairs, which addressed the pressing priorities of fundraising and connecting with graduates, were founded early during Halladay's administration and then transferred from the jurisdiction of the president's administrative assistant to the Division of Student and University Advancement by 1970.

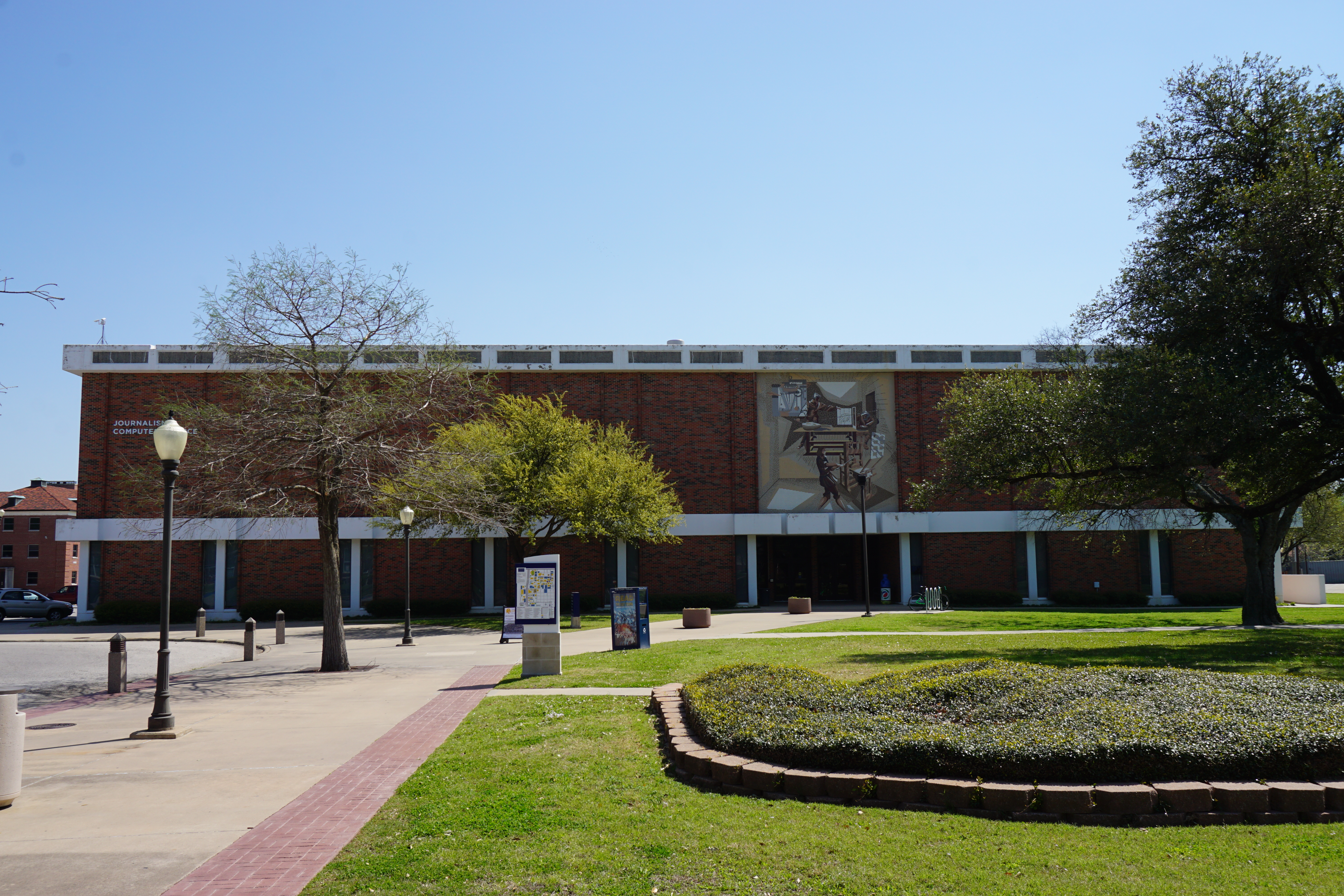
The Journalism Building in 2016

By 1972, Halladay's building campaign, which followed on the heels of Gee's highly successful expansion of the physical plant, had invested $16 million in construction and resulted in numerous new buildings. Among these were the Administration/Business Administration Building (later named for President F. H. McDowell), three major dormitories (Hubbell, Smith, and Whitley Halls), the Journalism/Graphic Arts Building, a new president's house (a new, larger residence south of campus on Texas State Highway 50 opened in 1968), the Student Affairs Building (later named for Halladay), and a variety of farm and maintenance buildings. Halladay's building campaign also resulted in significant additions to the Field House, Gee Library, the Science Building, and the Student Center. The library's 1969 addition expanded it by 31,000 square feet (2,900 m^{2}) and increased its capacity to 750,000 volumes; over 30,000 books, microforms, and other cataloged items were added to its holdings during 1969 alone. In 1971, a comprehensive campus plan was developed by an outside engineering firm for ETSU, and while it was not entirely implemented due to an unexpected decline in students that occurred during the 1970s, it did result in the closing of Bryan Street and College Drive and their replacement with pedestrian malls.

After the creation of East Texas State's doctoral program in 1962, the Coordinating Board announced its intention to phase it out in 1966. This was part of an effort by Governor John Connally to reduce "wasteful duplication of programs" that resulted in the creation of a list of approved doctorate-granting state universities, on which ETSU was not included. However, due largely to the influence of State Senator A. M. Aikin Jr. of Paris, State Representative Ralph Hall of Rockwall, and university comptroller F. H. "Bub" McDowell, the Coordinating Board reversed course in 1967 and reinstated ETSU's doctoral program with minor changes, most notably the replacement of the Ph.D. degree with the Ed.D. The revived program accepted new students from 1968–69. The Coordinating Board also granted ETSU approval to open a branch campus in Texarkana in April 1971, which without a physical campus of its own shared facilities with Texarkana College, a junior college. ETSU Texarkana developed "almost as a separate entity", according to Reynolds, sharing a system of governance with the main campus in Commerce but enjoying significant independence in regard to budget, curriculum, and faculty.

The size of the faculty at ETSU continued to grow: during his final year as president in 1965–66, Gee had hired an "unprecedented" 50 new professors, a feat equaled by Halladay the very next year. Full-time faculty members grew from 208 in 1965 to 331 in 1968–69, although the percentage of them who held doctorates slumped during this span from 58% (in 1965) to 49% (in 1968–69). Compensation and benefits for faculty also increased noticeably during this period: the average salary more than doubled between 1958 and 1968 (from $4,710 to $10,938), the standard teaching load was reduced from 15 hours to 12 in 1966, a tenure policy was approved in 1968, and a Faculty Senate was established in 1970. According to Reynolds, however, the Faculty Senate was more an effort by the administration to meet Southern Association of Colleges and Schools guidelines than it was "any real commitment to the principle of shared governance".

Halladay's relative lack of charm and the "mutual distrust" that existed between him and the faculty led to many of them feeling indifferent towards him, in contrast with Gee's more personal yet also more polarizing style. A former dean recalled his belief that Halladay "did not like confrontation", and that his often ambiguous style resulted in misunderstandings in communication. Halladay, who had a background in student services, generally related better to the students and he described himself as "essentially student-oriented". He attended numerous student events, ate frequently in the university cafeteria, and enjoyed interacting with students in informal settings.

== Declining enrollment and increasing diversity ==
Despite projections for continuing growth made by the Coordinating Board in 1968, student enrollment started to slow significantly in the early 1970s. Its 1971 enrollment was 8,805, slightly less than in 1968. It rebounded to 9,981 in 1975, although this was significantly lower than the Coordinating Board's projection of 13,500 for that year. By spring 1986 it had fallen to its low point: 6,342, a 36% loss over the past 11 years. The number of on-campus students similarly dropped rapidly during this period. In fall 1980, enrollment figures likewise revealed that off-campus enrollment had slumped by 26%. The cause of the decline was multifaceted: declining birthrates, the Coordinating Board's "crack down on the off-campus offering of universities", and an emphasis by ETSU on graduate programs at the expense of their undergraduate counterparts all contributed to the trend.

As ETSU's enrollment declined in the late 1970s and early 1980s, however, its student body became increasingly diverse: older non-traditional students, ethnic and racial minority students, and international students all grew in numbers. African Americans constituted the largest minority group on campus: after first being admitted to ETSU after it integrated in 1964 and numbering just 300 in 1968, by 1975 there were 1,400 African American students on campus. They accounted for more than 14% of the student body that year, before peaking at over 16% of total enrollment in 1976. Hispanic Americans constituted the second largest minority group during the ETSU era, with the majority of them heralding from South Texas. The principal countries of origin for international students during this period were India, Iran, Micronesia, Nigeria, Taiwan, and Thailand.

Reynolds argues that racial tensions on campus "reached a peak in the spring of 1968", after the assassination of Martin Luther King Jr. While there were no demonstrations or riots on campus, ETSU's African American students formed the African-American Student Society at East Texas (ASSET), which advocated their demands for equal treatment in matters of housing, course offerings in African American history and literature, and the employment of African American faculty members. President Halladay responded to the demands by hiring guidance and counseling professor David Talbot, a native of British Guyana and a Ph.D. from Columbia University, as the university's first African American faculty member. While Talbot was warmly received by most faculty and students, Reynolds notes that one campus security officer persistently addressed him as "boy" and that "for too long Dr. Talbot was the only black faculty member".

In 1969, one year after Talbot joined the faculty, J. Mason Brewer was hired as the first African American professor in ETSU's English Department. Author Carolyn Fiedler Satterwhite described him as the state's "most prominent black writer and one of the nation's top black folklorists". He remained a full-time professor at the university until his death in January 1975. Ivory Moore was hired as Director of Minority Affairs by the university in 1972, becoming its first African American administrator. In 1973, he played a key role in mediating a conflict between Kappa Alpha Order and African American students over the hosting of Confederate-themed Old South Week, ultimately helping the university reach a compromise that would allow the celebration to be held only if it were off campus.

Another major first for African American students at ETSU occurred when Glenda McKissic was elected homecoming queen in 1969, despite a walkout by many whites during the coronation ceremony. Between 1970 and 1989, nine more African American women would be crowned as homecoming queens. After 1968, African Americans also gained equal access to the organizations that reported to ETSU administration, including the cheerleading corps, the Student Activities Board, and student government. However, they had a much more difficult time gaining access to the Greek organizations on campus; Reynolds notes that the existing fraternities and sororities "continued to exemplify a greater degree of segregation than any other segment of the university". To remedy the situation, African American fraternities Alpha Phi Alpha and Omega Psi Phi petitioned for recognition in 1969 and were chartered in February 1970. Alpha Kappa Alpha became the first African American sorority on campus when it was chartered in May 1970, a few months before Delta Sigma Theta gained its charter. Other African American Greek organizations would join them in later years, including sorority Zeta Phi Beta in 1973 and fraternities Phi Beta Sigma and Kappa Alpha Psi in 1975.

== Admissions crisis and increasing standards ==
In spring 1972, President Halladay resigned suddenly after his wife's suicide. Vice President for Administration F. H. "Bub" McDowell was named the next president of the university, despite his lack of a doctoral degree or administrative experience at any school other than East Texas State. Born in Paris, he worked for the school for a total of 45 years, first being hired immediately after graduating with a bachelor's degree from what was at the time East Texas State College (ETSC). Reynolds argues that, while some people "suspected cronyism", McDowell's appointment helped the university maintain continuity as well as fiscal integrity. McDowell developed a reputation for making decisions privately, being "intensely loyal" to the university and demanding loyalty from others, and being averse to criticism. He was also willing to experiment with new ideas, however, such as the innovative New Center for Learning that was created in 1975. He also supported the creation of the Federation of North Texas Area Universities, a three-university consortium dedicated to sharing faculty, library resources, and computer services with the University of North Texas and Texas Woman's University; MACH III, a program that provided counseling and tutoring to disabled and minority students; Upward Bound, a program to support disadvantaged minority high school students in local schools; and Project MICRO, a federal government-funded program to accept Micronesian students. The latter program, however, accepted students who did not meet the general admission standards, which Reynolds argues "was probably detrimental to the academic reputation of the university".

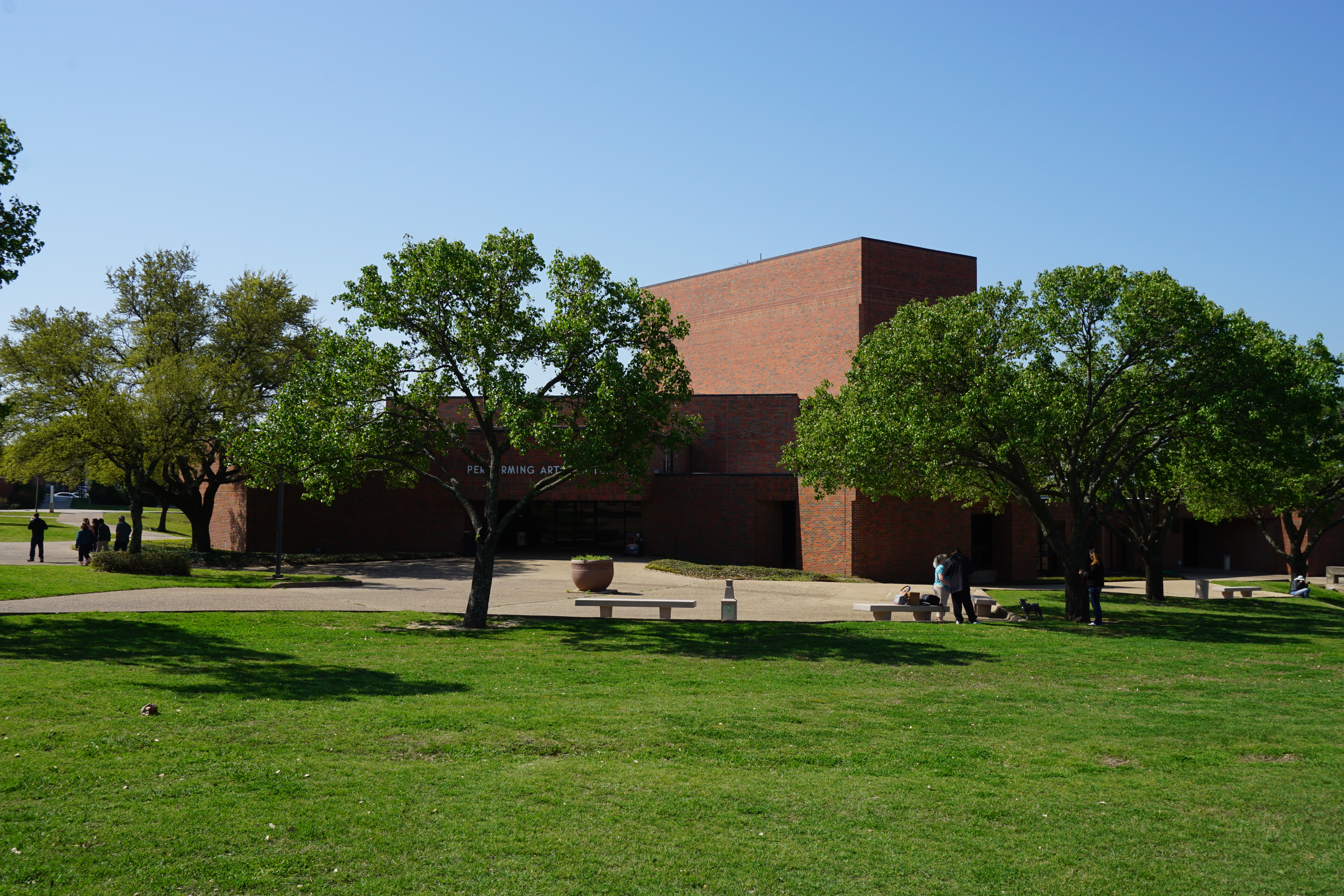
The Performing Arts Center in 2016

Another wave of new construction on campus occurred during McDowell's tenure, which witnessed the construction of a Creative Arts Village in 1975, a new Department of Agriculture building and a Performing Arts Center in 1976, and a new print shop in 1979. Numerous other buildings were remodeled or expanded, including the president's home (in 1972) as well as Binnion Hall, Henderson Hall, and Mayo Hall. In the June 1974 issue of Texas Monthly, Richard West lamented the $90,000–100,000 cost to the state incurred by the remodeling of the president's home. He referred to the house, which featured a new elevator, an expanded dining room, and a solarium, as a "bush-league Bauer House", in reference to the $923,315 residence of University of Texas System Chancellor Charles LeMaistre.

While ETSU's faculty remained well-staffed during this period, however, its student enrollment numbers continued to trend downward: after peaking at 9,981 in fall 1975, it slid to 8,322 by fall 1980, a drop of 17% in just five years. All substantive efforts at remedies, including lowering some admission standards, failed to reverse the trend. This also hurt the university's funding, as state institutions in Texas were funded by credit-hour production. However, McDowell's cautious management of ETSU's finances "may well have saved the university" from the challenges it faced during the 1980s. In January 1982, after reaching the mandatory retirement age of 70, McDowell stepped down from his post.

On February 1, 1982, Charles J. Austin was named the next president of ETSU. He was formerly the vice president for academic affairs at Georgia Southern College, and had previously worked for Trinity University, the University of Colorado Medical Center, and the federal Department of Health, Education, and Welfare. He held degrees from the University of Cincinnati, the University of Colorado, and Xavier University. Almost immediately after being named president, Austin turned his attention to the university's declining enrollment, which had shrunk to just 7,628 by spring 1982, his first semester as president. He made the decision to address the crisis by raising admissions standards, admittedly a risky approach. In his own words, he rationalized that ETSU's "single most important commodity" was its academic reputation, and that "[r]elaxing standards in order to attract students is not the answer to long-term growth and development of the university". Between 1983 and 1985, the university raised the ACT, SAT, and GRE scores it required for admission, eliminated exceptions in its admission process, and refused to any longer accept self-reported grades in lieu of transcripts. Enrollment continued to fall until the mid-1980s, from 7,757 in fall 1982 to 6,867 in fall 1985 (down 11.5%), before starting to grow by the end of the decade, reaching 7,811 in 1989. On-campus housing figures generally followed enrollment numbers, dipping from nearly 2,000 in 1975–76 to just 914 in 1986, before partially recovering to 1,133 by 1989.

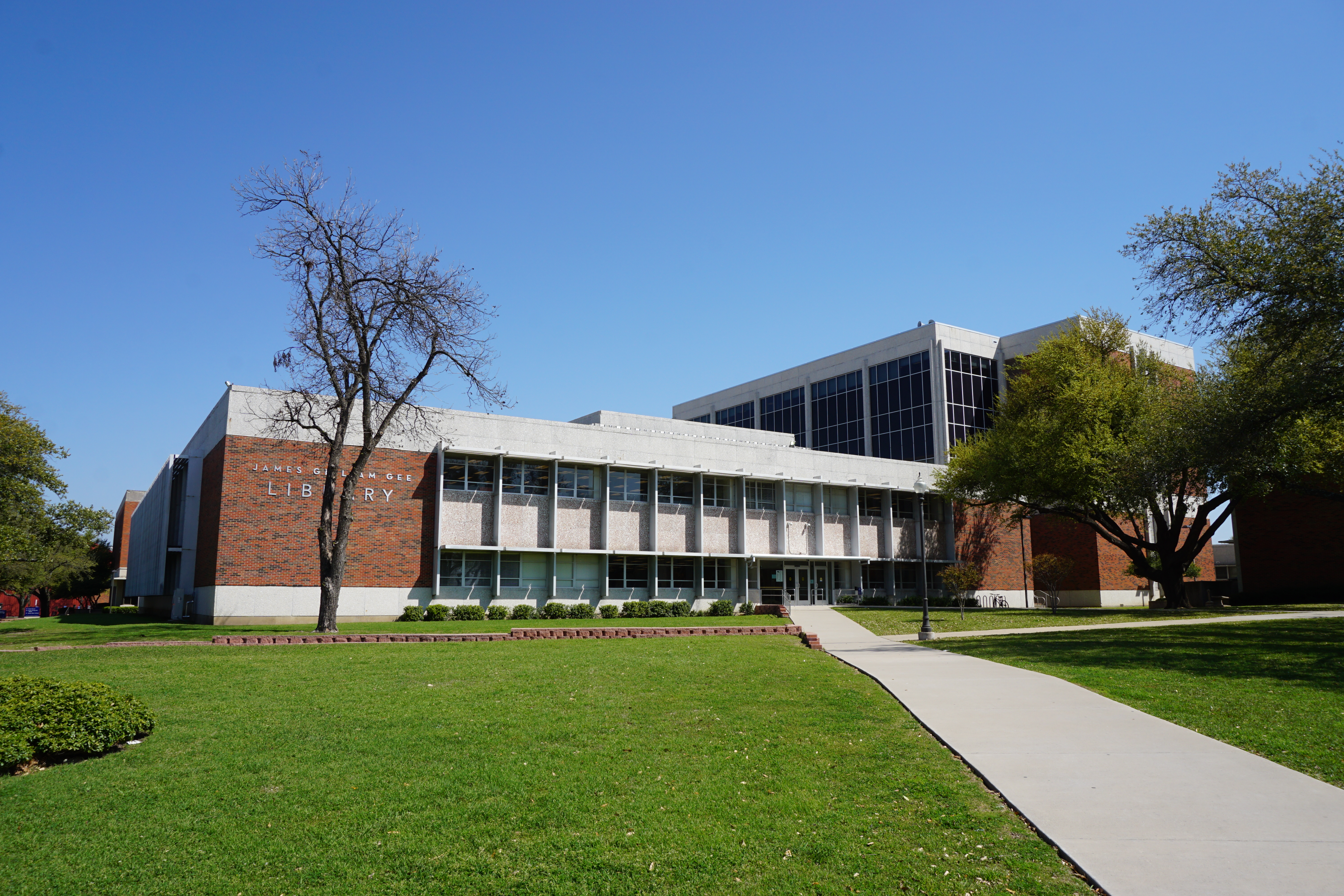
The James G. Gee Library in 2016

Austin also made the recruiting and retention of "high quality faculty" a major priority, largely by emphasizing research, much to the chagrin of many faculty members who felt that they had been hired to teach and not to research. Furthermore, the fact that salary increases for faculty at ETSU failed to keep pace with the state average irked many on campus. Austin additionally reformed the Faculty Senate into a more democratic and participative body, although according to Reynolds "it was still too large and too divided to be an effective instrument of governance".

Thanks largely to the passage of Proposition 2, which created a Higher Education Assistance Fund to help finance construction at state universities in Texas, numerous campus buildings were renovated during the Austin years, although previous years of overbuilding precluded the need for new construction. The Field House, Gee Library, Memorial Student Center, Smith Hall, Whitley Gymnasium, Whitley Hall, and the Zeppa Center were all renovated or expanded during this era. Austin and his wife, Carol, also made strides in beautifying the campus, chiefly by securing an adequate water supply from Lake Tawakoni and planting numerous flowers, shrubs, and trees around the grounds.

== Major crises and threats of closure ==
The most serious problems faced during the Austin administration stemmed from the economic crisis in Texas in the mid-1980s. As oil prices plunged, drastic cuts of $676 million to state colleges and universities were proposed in 1985, including a cut of $6.3 million for ETSU that would have accounted for more than 25% of its budget. In the end, however, the university's budget was cut by $2 million, which Reynolds termed "serious enough, but not catastrophic".

In the March 1985 issue of Texas Monthly, Paul Burka proposed reducing the state budget by $1 billion through a series of cuts that including moving ETSU to Texarkana and transforming it into a junior college he styled East Texas Junior College, which he projected would save the state $24.2 million. Burka reasoned that the university had become expendable due to its decline in enrollment, from 9,981 in 1975 to approximately 7,000 by 1985, which had been caused primarily by the creation of the University of Texas at Dallas, the University of Texas at Tyler, and numerous new junior colleges in the area. In the May 1985 issue of the same magazine, President Austin himself wrote a letter to the editor in which he defended the school against Burka's suggestion that it was unhealthy, calling Burka's assessment "far from accurate". Austin further argued that ETSU's academic quality "has never enjoyed more robust health" and that the school was working toward reversing falling enrollment numbers by its efforts to "increase standards for student admission and retention dramatically, revitalize its academic offerings, and attract additional prominent scholars to its faculty".

A more serious crisis occurred in spring 1986, when Select Committee on Higher Education chairman Larry Temple proposed the closure of some state universities, including ETSU. In response, Austin assembled a special committee (led by Keith McFarland) to document the school's strengths in a white paper, sent 50,000 letters to alumni asking for their support, and organized a July 1986 bus trip to Austin that took 450 supporters of the university to the State Capitol in a show of support that ultimately ensured that ETSU would not be closed. President Austin had accepted the position of head of the Department of Health Care and Administration at the University of Alabama at Birmingham's medical school before East Texas State's existence had been secured, but according to Reynolds he did not leave ETSU until after the bus trip "because he did not want to jeopardize that mission".

Jerry Morris was named the next university president on January 1, 1987, after a nationwide search that included 144 candidates. A native of Arkansas and the holder of three degrees (including an Ed.D.) from the University of Arkansas, he had worked at East Texas State since 1970. He held multiple positions before being named vice president for academic affairs in 1982, as which he served until December 1986. Chosen largely for his familiarity with the preceding Austin administration, Morris was characterized by Reynolds as "unquestionably...one of the most amiable presidents ET had ever had".

Among the earliest challenges that Morris faced was an economic one, a reduction of $808,334 in appropriations for 1986. The new president addressed this by canceling raises and salary increases for the year, which hurt faculty morale. By 1989, the pay disparity between ETSU faculty and the average at state schools grew to $4,000. Morris' goal to make salaries more competitive with those of other schools "proved to be an elusive one", partially due to ETSU's relatively overstaffed faculty, evidenced by abnormally low student–teacher ratios. Morris attempted to improve faculty morale in other ways than through salary, reducing the membership of the Faculty Senate in order to make it more of a decision-making body while also creating a Senior Faculty Forum, which often gave suggestions to the president that were ultimately implemented. By the late 1980s, as the faculty at ETSU shrank, Morris began to address one of his highest priorities: building a more diverse faculty. Women grew from 20% of the faculty in 1975 to almost 26% in 1990, and in 1987 Donna Arlton became the first woman to hold a high-level academic office when she was named vice president of academic affairs, replacing Morris himself. However, the numbers of African American and Hispanic faculty members did not experience similar growth.

Morris also was able to make improvements to ETSU's physical plant with Proposition 2 funds, including to the Art Building, Education North, and student housing buildings. By 1989, the entire campus was valued at $171 million. In addition, Morris emphasized development of the recruitment and retention programs that had been initiated during the Austin administration. By 1990, it had staff recruiters contacting over 21,000 high school and junior college students, and its impact on the school was clear: student enrollment reached 7,808 in fall 1989 and eclipsed 8,000 in 1992, despite tuition hikes. The student body remained fairly diverse in the late 1980s, with African Americans constituting almost 10% of total students in 1989, Hispanics at nearly 3%, and non-traditional students remaining "[e]asily the most numerous 'minority'", according to Reynolds.

By 1990, ETSU had been accredited by or gained membership in a large number of associations and councils, including the American Association of State Colleges and Universities, the American Council on Education, the Association of Texas Colleges and Universities, the Council of Colleges of Arts and Sciences, the National Council for Accreditation of Teacher Education, and the Southern Association of Colleges and Schools. Also by the 1990s, ETSU's total campus had expanded to 1,883 acres (762 ha), and the total value of its physical plant had reached $150 million.

In 1996, ETSU was admitted into the Texas A&M University System and renamed Texas A&M University–Commerce under the leadership of President Morris. Keith McFarland also played a key role during the transition.

== Student life ==
The ETSU campus experienced relatively little in terms of student protest during the late 1960s and early 1970s, although the dress of students changed radically as the previous strict dress codes fell by the wayside in favor of miniskirts, ragged jeans, and shorts. Controlled substances such as marijuana and LSD were somewhat popular among the student body, albeit not to the same degree as on many other college campuses. Protests against the Vietnam War were rare and sparsely attended; however, in 1970 a tense disagreement between students regarding whether or not to lower the American flag on campus to half-mast in memory of those killed in the Kent State shootings resulted in a compromise in which a makeshift flagpole was erected by a group of liberal students so they could fly the flag at half-staff while a group of conservative students kept the flag on the main pole flying at full-staff.

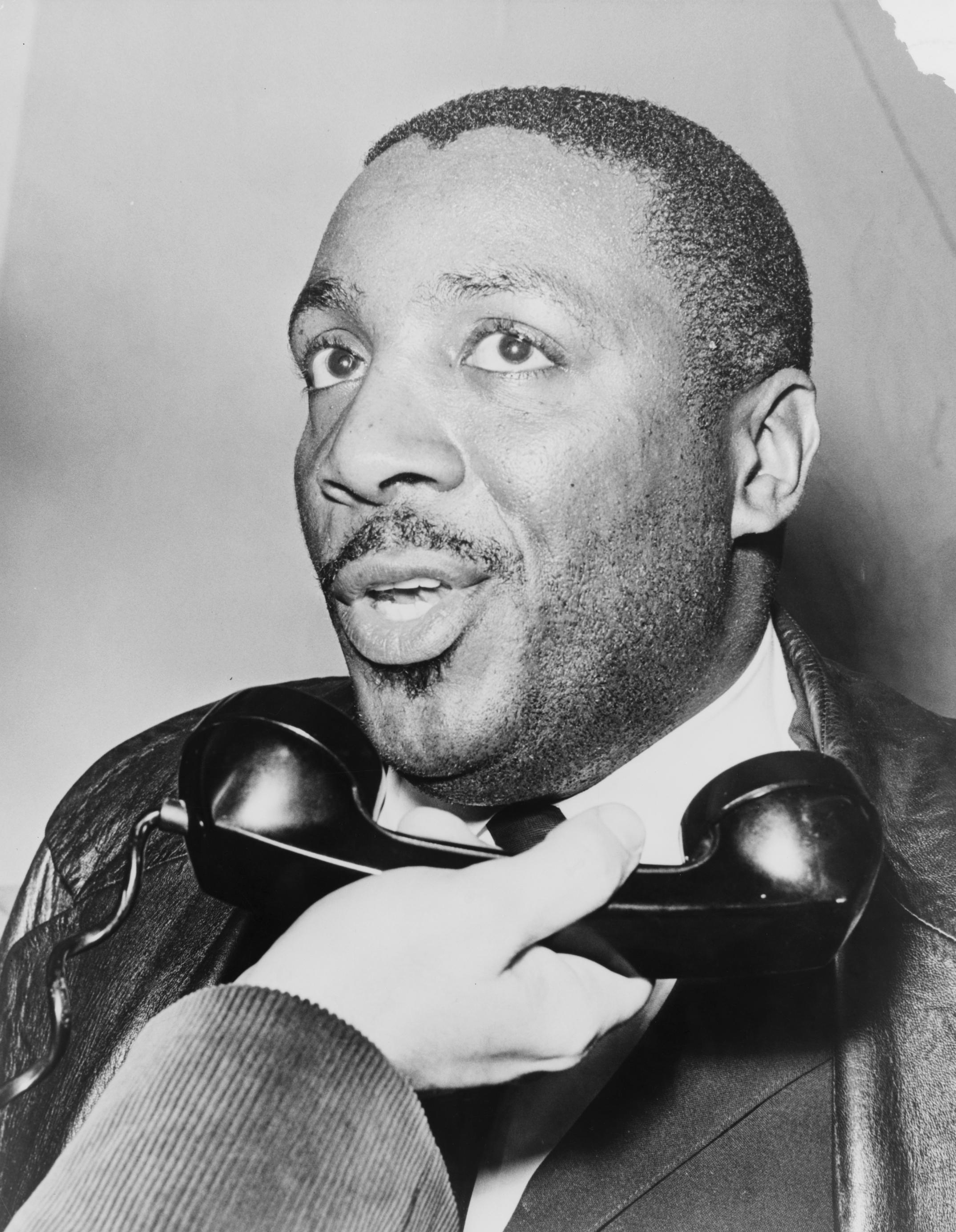
Dick Gregory in 1964

In fall 1968, another controversy occurred when President Halladay "abruptly canceled" a speaking appearance by African American comedian Dick Gregory, an activist in the civil rights movement and opponent of the Vietnam War who was considered to be "especially controversial among conservative politicians". A spirited dialogue ensued on campus, including a three-hour debate sponsored by the student senate, and ultimately Gregory did make an appearance at ETSU two years later in 1970.

Many popular student activities continued from previous eras, including Children's Day, Down South Week, Old South Week, and Western Week, as well as homecoming. The homecoming parade remained a favorite student activity in the late 1960s and early 1970s, although it was discontinued in 1976 due to ETSU's declining enrollment, rising expenses, and a higher proportion of students commuting to classes. Innovations during the Halladay administration included the creation of distinguished alumni awards and Parents' Day (later Family Day), both in 1967, and University Day. Alumni Day was created by the Alumni Office in the 1980s.

The Forum Arts program persisted into the ETSU era, until it was discontinued for funding reasons in 1978. It brought a wide variety of talent to Commerce, including the Preservation Hall Jazz Band of New Orleans, and the program presented 33 total events in 1967 alone. Novelist Pat Conroy also participated in the Forum Arts program. In 1970, the Student Activities Board established the Five Star Series, which was funded with student activity fees. It brought many other prestigious artists and creative minds to campus, including Roots author Alex Haley, M*A*S*H actor Larry Linville (who played Frank Burns), and actor Vincent Price. In 1975, the university established the Sam Rayburn Symposium, which featured prominent politicians and scholars, including columnist Patrick Buchanan, Liz Carpenter, historian Frank Freidel, Lady Bird Johnson, former Speaker of the United States House of Representatives John William McCormack, George Reedy, Congressman Ray Roberts, political satirist Mark Russell, and Speaker of the House Jim Wright.

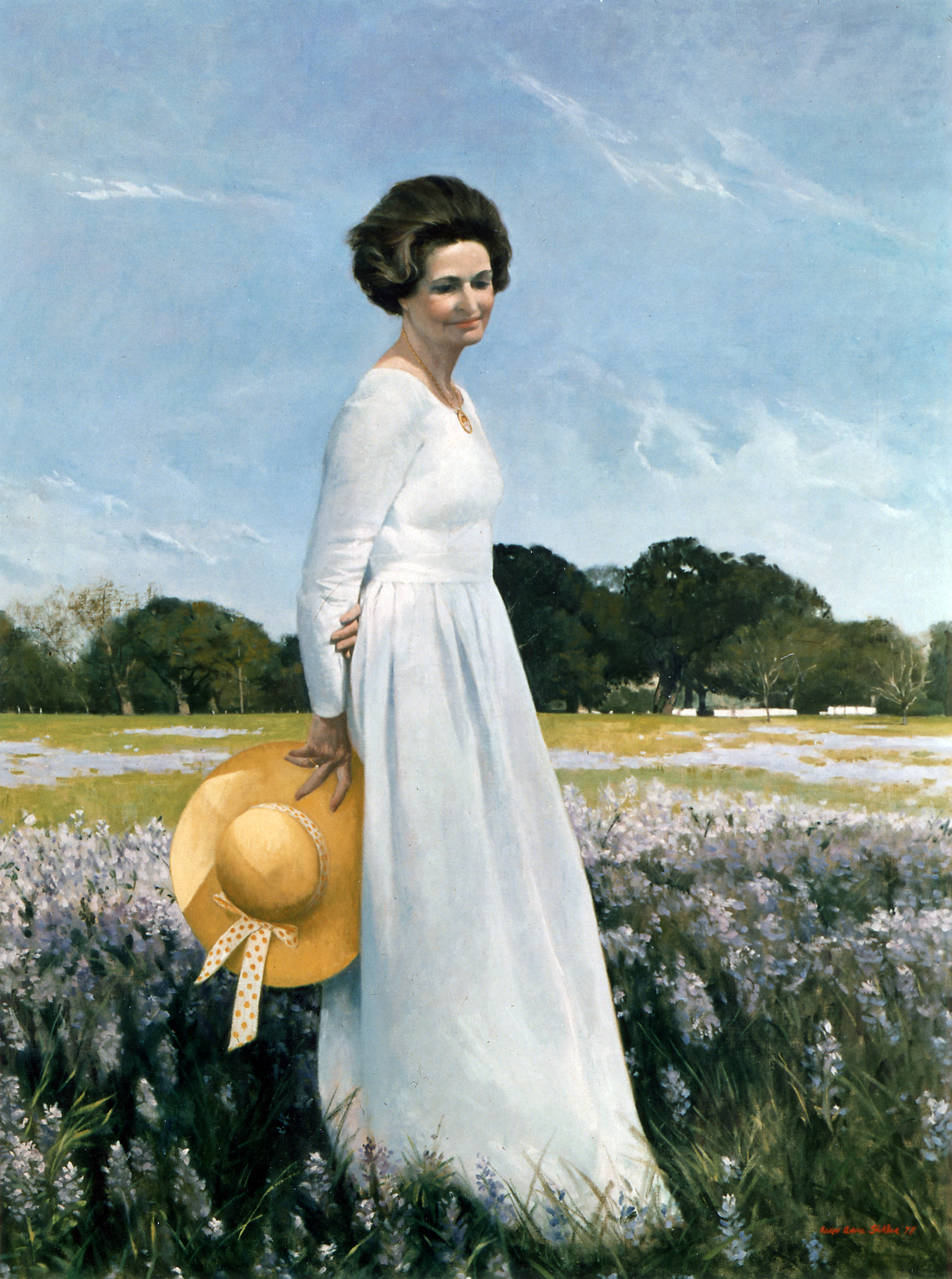
1978 portrait of Lady Bird Johnson

This period in university history also witnessed the creation of Black Awareness Week (in 1972) and the Texas Women's Enrichment Series (in 1989). Additional programs were offered by a variety of academic departments on campus, including a series of lectures and a three-day Fall Literary Festival sponsored by Literature and Languages, periodic shows scheduled by Art, plays offered by the Department of Communications and Theatre, and even Broadway musicals and operas produced in collaboration by Communications and Theatre with Music (the later was boosted by the completion of the Performing Arts Center in 1975).

1975 also witnessed the creation of KETR, an FM radio station on campus that simultaneously covered local and university news, played a wide variety of music, and was affiliated with National Public Radio. In 1979, it was joined by KETV, a cable television channel with a similarly local focus. The ETSU era also saw a plethora of print media at the university: The East Texan (the student newspaper, published since 1915), the ETSU Special (a feature magazine), Forthcoming (a creative writing journal), and The Locust (the university yearbook, which went defunct in 1985).

ETSU also produced many notable alumni, including politician Mary Lou Bruner, U.S. Representative and United States House Committee on Agriculture chairman Mike Conaway, author, history professor, and State Historian of Texas Bill O'Neal, and Emmy-winning artist Gary Panter.

== Athletics ==
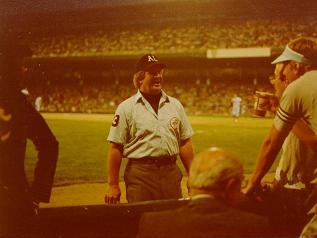
Durwood Merrill in 1980

ETSU continued playing intercollegiate athletics in the National Association of Intercollegiate Athletics (NAIA) until 1972, when it moved to Division II in the National Collegiate Athletic Association (NCAA). The football team remained the most popular squad on campus, and while not as dominant as they had been during the "Golden Fifties", they often competed for Lone Star Conference (LSC) championships during the 1960s and 1970s. Durwood Merrill, who played for the football team while it still competed in the NAIA, recalls that the Lions were regularly ranked in the top ten in the country and claims that they "could have beaten some of the Southwest Conference teams". The highlight of the era was the 1972 team, which won the NAIA national championship with a 21–18 victory over Carson–Newman College. The team, often considered the best in school history, was led by head coach Ernest Hawkins and defensive end Harvey Martin, who later played for the Dallas Cowboys of the National Football League (NFL).

Wade Wilson quarterbacked the Lions in the late 1970s and early 1980s, twice being named an All-American before embarking on an 18-year NFL career with the Cowboys and the Minnesota Vikings. The 1990 football team would be the last to win an LSC title until 2014, while the 1995 squad was the last to appear in the NCAA Division II playoffs until 2013. In the early 1990s, quarterback Clint Dolezel played for ETSU before enjoying a successful Arena Football League (AFL) career, ultimately serving as the head coach of the AFL's Philadelphia Soul, which he led to the ArenaBowl XXIX title in 2016.

The men's basketball team, on the other hand, struggled to compete in the LSC from the mid-1960s to the mid-1970s, before winning the conference title four times (and finishing second twice) during a six-year span from 1973–74 to 1978–79 under head coach Jim Gudger. The team then struggled to be competitive until it won two conference championships in 1984 and 1990, under head coach Jerry Matthews. The 1965–66 men's basketball team and the City of Commerce were portrayed as racially abusing opposing players in a fictionalized scene in the Disney film Glory Road, which chronicled the NCAA-champion Texas Western team (the first to start five African American players in a national championship game). University president Keith McFarland even voiced his displeasure with the film's portrayal of the university to Walt Disney Studios chairperson Richard Cook.

Between 1964 and 1978, the men's tennis team achieved "the greatest sustained success in the history of ET sports", according to Reynolds, winning 12 LSC championships under head coach Bill Crabtree as well as the 1972 and 1978 NAIA national championships. The team endured relatively uncompetitive seasons from 1978 to 1985, before winning conference titles three consecutive years from 1985 to 1987. Ultimately, however, the program was shuttered by the administration largely for financial reasons. Men's track and field and men's golf similarly suffered from a reduction in funding and restrictions on scholarships, with, as of 1993, the former failing to win a conference title since 1967 and the latter since 1965.

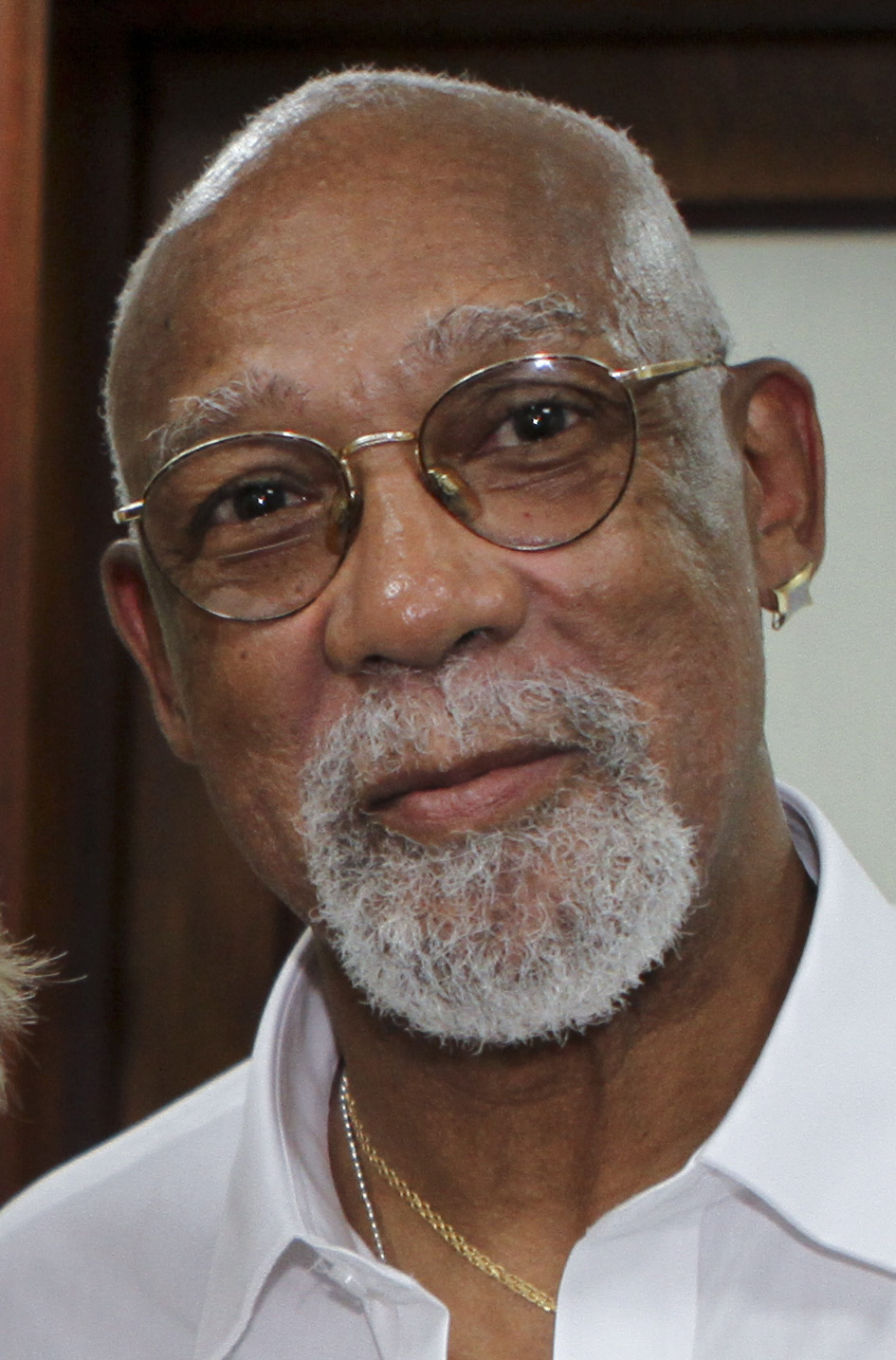
John Carlos in 2012

African American students made major contributions to ETSU athletics after the integration of the university in 1964: Curtis Guyton and Arthur James both starred for the football team in the mid to late 1960s, while a number of later Lion football players went on to play in the NFL, including Autry Beamon (with the Minnesota Vikings), Harvey Martin (Dallas Cowboys), and Dwight White (Pittsburgh Steelers). John Carlos competed for the track team in 1966–67 before the 1968 Summer Olympics, where he became well known for his raised-fist salute during his medal ceremony. ETSU had only been integrated for a year when Carlos was recruited by the school, and he described Commerce as "not just 65 miles" from Dallas, but "also about 65 years in the past" when compared to the Texan metropolis. He additionally accused track coach Delmer Brown of not treating African American athletes fairly. Other African American track team members accused Brown of mistreatment in 1970, and in early 1972 African American football players issued "a long list of complaints" against head coach Ernest Hawkins, which ultimately resulted in the creation and implementation of 16 recommendations by the Athletic Council before the football team's national championship season that fall.

While informal women's intercollegiate athletics existed without university funding from the early 1960s via the Texas Association of Intercollegiate Athletics for Women (TAIAW), the passage of Title IX by the United States Congress in 1972 revolutionized college sports by mandating "that women athletes must be given the same opportunities as their male counterparts". ETSU began to field funded women's intercollegiate teams in 1974, but initially their funding was insufficient; the first budget allocated $10,300 to all women's athletics, which Director of Women's Athletics Margo Harbison appealed. This resulted in President F. H. McDowell doubling the amount, although even this failed to provide any scholarships, though it did pay for uniforms. Ten years later, in 1984, the budget for women's athletics at the university was $117,000, $74,000 of which was designated for scholarships.

By 1980, ETSU was fielding women's teams in basketball, tennis, track, and volleyball. Of these, the volleyball team enjoyed the most success during the period, becoming the first of the university's women's teams to qualify for a national tournament when it did so in 1979. It went on to finish the 1980 NAIA national tournament as runners-up, win the LSC championship back-to-back in 1986 and 1987, and reach the quarterfinals of the NCAA Division II tournament in 1987. The latter two achievements came under head coach Kathy Goodlett. The tennis team also achieved national success in the early 1980s, but like its men's counterpart it was terminated in 1987. Cross country and track teams were retained for both men and women.

The intramural sports program at ETSU also grew substantially after Gee's presidency, fueled largely by increased participation from independent and Greek organizations on campus as well as significant participation by female students. By the mid-1970s, the intramural program had expanded well beyond its traditional offerings of basketball and football, offering such sports as archery, billiards, and bowling. In 1975–76, 3,500 students participated in intramurals, out of a total student population of less than 9,000. 1976 also witnessed the opening of the Joseph Zeppa Center for Recreational Instruction, which hosted numerous intramural sports and physical education courses as well as offering students facilities such as a bowling alley, handball/racquetball courts, a weight room, saunas, a 25-meter (82 ft) swimming pool, and a diving well.
