= Ron Poe =

American football coach

Biographical details
- Born: 1942 (age 83–84)

Coaching career (HC unless noted)
- 1971–2000: McKinney HS (TX)

Head coaching record
- Overall: 221–106–4

Accomplishments and honors

Championships
- Texas 3A state (1979)

Ron Poe (born 1942) is an American former football coach. He served as head football coach and athletic director at McKinney High School in McKinney, Texas, from 1971 to 2000. Under his guidance, McKinney won a Class 3A state championship in 1979 and finished runner-up in 1986. Poe amassed a 221–106–4 in his 30-year-long coaching career and is among the winningest football coaches of all-time in the state of Texas.

Poe received a bachelor's degree in 1964 and a master's degree in 1967 from East Texas State University—now known as Texas A&M University–Commerce. He began teaching and coaching in 1964 at Mansfield High School. He also served at Greenville High School from 1965 to 1970. He succeeded Scott Johnson as McKinney head coach in 1971.

In April 2006 the McKinney Independent School District renamed its football venue Ron Poe Stadium.
