= Jeff Parrott =

American painter

Jeff Parrott (a.k.a. Psyexpression) (born 1983, Dallas, Texas, United States), is an American artist. He grew up in Dallas. He started painting and the playing the violin at the age of four and the piano synthesizer keyboard. Parrott created Psyexpression a painting Diaries of consciousness and alien creatures from hidden realms of the universe. This manic feeling manifested into an ideal called, Psyexpressionism the underground psychedelic trip and GoaPsy far out darkness androids from light being seen an aliens dreams paintings neural creatures inside Psyexpressionism artist movement. Jeffrey Parrott culture comes from a different place and space one that is inside the house the studio the four walled realms we live inside to bring out the universe information for the future.

== Career ==
Parrott works on the side of reality unseen by the viewer. This genre of psyche and angst is caused due in part by the human condition, which Parrott, pursues with a dark snare where his unconscious mind rolls into the consciousness of his self that is than analyzed by the viewer. Jeff Parrott, loved making art and playing the violin since he was five years old. Jeff Parrott, has a musical and painting genre called 'PsyExpression' where Parrott, has composed 6 music albums all released, this year 2016, which he has worked on for the last decade, which his latest album called Alien Music, which is collaged piles of styles experimental electronica. The work Jeff Parrott does, would be considered underground an not seen by may, but he does not mind this, for he will create works of art because he has to in order to stay sane and collaborate with society's expectations. Jeff Parrott, feels he is an alien within an alien world where he thrives to succeed in expressing the unseen of existence in raw form. art is only important if one does not know but at the same time does know. That is why reality must be recorded and Jeff Parrott, records string from years of searching for the outside of this universe to bring into existence to earth. Dallas artist, Jeff Parrott who creates sound and painting that relates the unconscious processes. It's an art genre called Psyexpression, which relates to how human expression in art and music can explain truth and Jeff Parrott, creates psychedelic landscapes and experimental expressesion through painting sound. Jeff Parrott, currently performs live music in underground venues throughout Texas
