= Federation of North Texas Area Universities =

The Federation of North Texas Area Universities is an educational consortium of three public universities in the North Texas region: the University of North Texas, Texas Woman's University, and Texas A&M University–Commerce. Graduate students at a member institution are able to cross-register in classes at other members. The consortium also hosts an annual research symposium.

The consortium was established in 1968 with assistance from the Texas Higher Education Coordinating Board.
