= Mary Lou Bruner =

American retired educator and former political candidate

- Education: BA: Texas Wesleyan University; MEd: Texas A&M University–Commerce
- Known for: Expressing controversial views while running for the Texas State Board of Education
- Political party: Republican
- Spouse: Anthony Bruner

Mary Lou Bruner is an American retired educator and former political candidate. Bruner was a public school teacher and counselor for 36 years before retiring and becoming an activist. She attracted national attention during her 2016 campaign for the Republican nomination for an East Texas seat on the Texas State Board of Education because of her controversial and extreme views on topics including President Barack Obama, the science of evolution, Islam, and homosexuality. She has expressed her belief that Obama was a gay prostitute, that Islam's goal is to conquer the US, that pre-K programs encourage children into homosexual marriage, and that being a Democrat equates to being a mass-murderer. Bruner, who has been called the "looniest politician in Texas," has been publicly ridiculed for her views. Bruner said in an interview: "I don't know why I'm getting so much attention. I'm just saying what I believe."

Bruner advanced to a runoff election, but lost in May 2016.

== Early life and education ==
Bruner has a bachelor's degree from Texas Wesleyan University and a Master of Education degree in special education from East Texas State University (now Texas A&M University–Commerce).

== Career in public schools ==
Bruner worked in Texas public schools for 36 years, including 20 as a teacher and diagnostician for learning-disabled students in Brownsboro Independent School District. She retired in 2009.

== Activism ==
Bruner began to be a vocal critic of the 15-member Texas State Board of Education (SBOE). She addressed the school board in 2010 to share her concerns with the state's school textbooks. When addressing the board members, Bruner expressed alarm to Dallas Democrat Lawrence Allen, a practicing Muslim, that countries in the Middle East were "using their influence to get what they want in the textbooks" and buying Texas' school books, saying, "I think the Middle Easterners are buying the textbooks! They're buying everything else here."

== Race for the Texas State Board of Education ==
In 2016, Bruner ran for the seat on the Texas State Board of Education representing District 9, a district covering 180 small school districts across 31 rural counties "stretching from Rockwall County east of Dallas to the Arkansas border and from the Oklahoma state line to the middle of East Texas." The deeply conservative region is dominated by conservative Christians and Tea Party activists. The seat was being vacated by the moderate Thomas Ratliff, first elected in 2010 (Note: When Thomas Ratliff was first elected in 2010, he ousted the less-moderate former chairman of the SBOE Don McLeroy.) but who was not seeking a 2016 reelection.

Bruner's opponents in the primary election were Republican Keven Ellis of Lufkin, a chiropractor who is the president of the Lufkin school board.

More than 107,000 East Texas Republicans voted for Bruner in the primary election, or about 48 percent of the vote, falling short of the required 50 percent Bruner needed to win the election outright. Ellis received 31 percent and Hering 20 percent. Bruner and Ellis then advanced to a May 24 runoff election.

The SBOE sets curriculum standards for Texas public schools and exerts considerable influence over the selection and content of Texas school textbooks used by over five million K-12 students. Because of the size of Texas' textbook market, learning materials developed for Texas are often used in other states as well. The SBOE has faced school textbook controversy in the past when former board members tried to inject ideologically driven information into science, history, and social studies textbooks that they believed was vital to be taught in Texas schools. (Note: Former conservative board members have drawn national derision by rejecting evolution and claiming that the U.S. Constitution says nothing about the separation of church and state. Some textbooks approved by the former board were later criticized for inaccuracies and biases; for example, one textbook removed reference to slavery, referring to the U.S. slave trade as the "Atlantic triangular trade.") With Bruner on the SBOE, citizens feared the far-right conservative would have an agenda to mount a similar attack on facts.

Just prior to the runoff election at a meeting of East Texas superintendents, Bruner gave a speech to the educators, during which she repeatedly made inaccurate statements about Texas education that forced her audience to fact-check her on the spot. Bruner tried asserting that 50 percent of Texas students are in a special education program, that only one in six public school graduates can read with fluency and comprehension, and that one school district started the year with 91 full-time substitute teachers. At each of these statements, different audience members interrupted Bruner's speech to inform her that her statements were not factual. After an audience member stood up and suggested to Bruner that she visit with superintendents in the area, to which Bruner replied that she had, the local county superintendent stood up and informed Bruner that she had never attempted to meet with her.

In the runoff election of May 24, 2016, Bruner was defeated by a wide margin by Ellis. Bruner was 68 years old at the time of her failed runoff election.

== Controversial public statements and beliefs ==
Bruner has advanced a number of "extreme views on politics and education" via her personal Facebook page. The New York Times noted that Bruner's views matched an "anti-Obama and conspiracy friendly antigovernment mind-set" common in conservative East Texas. As a candidate, Bruner pushed "the boundary of the far right" as her "anti-Obama, anti-Islam, anti-evolution and anti-gay Facebook posts have generated national headlines and turned an obscure school board election into a glimpse of the outer limits of Texas politics." NBC News described Bruner's posts as ranging "from biblical to bizarre" and dating back several years.

During the race for the seat on the SBOE, the nonprofit watchdog group Texas Freedom Network (TFN), which first brought Bruner's posts to public attention, warned that the SBOE has a history of mixing culture wars with public education and criticized many of Bruner's public statements immediately prior to her primary election. While some of Bruner's posts were later deleted, TFN and journalists of numerous Texas and national publications made screen shots of the posts and began reporting on them, questioning her fitness to hold public office. When asked about her public statements, Bruner defended them, saying "I don't intend to apologize for my opinions because I still believe my statements were accurate." After Bruner's defeat, TFN president Kathy Miller issued a statement saying: "Texas escaped an education train wreck tonight. If Bruner had ultimately won election to the board, she would have instantly become the most embarrassingly uninformed and divisive member on a board that already too often puts politics ahead of making sure our kids get a sound education."

Among Bruner's controversial views and statements:

- Bruner has accused President Barack Obama of formerly being a drug-using gay prostitute, writing in October 2015: "Obama has a soft spot for homosexuals because of the years he spent as a male prostitute in his twenties. That is how he paid for his drugs." "He has admitted he was addicted to drugs when he was young and he is sympathetic with homosexuals, but he hasn't come out of the closet about his own homosexual/bisexual background." She continued, "He hasn't quite evolved that much! Since he supports gay marriage, he should be proud of his background as a homosexual/bisexual. He is against everything else Christians stand for, he might as well be for infidelity." Bruner has referred to Obama as "Ahab the Arab" and said that the president "hates all white people and all wealthy people because to him wealthy means white."
- Bruner believes that the Patient Protection and Affordable Care Act is part of a United Nations "Agenda 21" plot to reduce the U.S. population by as much as 200 million (Note: The U.S. population is currently about 323 million, and Bruner believes that the UN wants to reduce the U.S. population to 125 million.) by using "Obamacare to make people die a little sooner than they would have died."
- Bruner has equated being a Democrat or a liberal with being a mass-murderer, writing, "all of the terrorist mass-murderers have described themselves as Democrats or liberals. Is there a pattern developing here?"
- Bruner has advanced John F. Kennedy assassination conspiracy theories. Bruner has written that "many people" believe the Democrats were behind the assassination of Democratic President John F. Kennedy, whom she called "a conservative president". In November 2015, she wrote that the Democratic Party carried out the assassination because they preferred "LBJ. The exact opposite of Kennedy – a socialist and an unethical politician." (Note: Bruner continued, "It does seem like this might have been the master plan: They sneaked the bad guy (LBJ) into the administration on the coat-tail of a good guy (JFK). Then they got rid of the good guy; in the end, they got a socialist president which is what they originally wanted.")
- Bruner contends that climate change is a "ridiculous hoax" and has written that "climate change has nothing to do with weather or climate" but rather is a plot, originating with Karl Marx, that "is all about system change from capitalism (free enterprise) to Socialism-Communism."
- Bruner has said that school shootings in the United States occur because students are being taught the science of evolution. Bruner wrote that "Evolution is a religious philosophy with propaganda supporting the religion of Atheism". Like other Young Earth creationists, Bruner believes dinosaurs and mankind walked the Earth at the same time; Bruner also believes that scientists found proof of a young Earth but have colluded to hide the evidence. Bruner wrote: "The dinosaurs on the ark may have been babies and not able to reproduce. It might make sense to take the small dinosaurs onto the ark instead of the ones bigger than a bus. After the flood, the few remaining Behemoths and Leviathans may have become extinct because there was not enough vegetation on earth for them to survive to reproductive age ... When the flood waters subsided and rushed into the oceans, there was no vegetation on the earth because the earth had been covered with water." A television reporter asked Bruner on-camera to clarify her beliefs concerning the biblical account of Noah's Ark and whether it was filled with pairs of animals and if the entire world was covered with water. Bruner later wrote, "THE ANSWER IS STILL YES, I believe the Holy Bible. I believe there was a Great Flood. How do YOU explain fossils of seashells and other sea animals on tops of mountains all over the world? How do you explain the Grand Canyon? You are very naive if you believe a tiny river carved out the Grand Canyon. I believe it took a lot more water than that to carve out the Grand Canyon and other land and rock formations formed by water erosion. You can call me ignorant or intolerant or whatever you want, but I did not make fun of YOUR religion."
- Bruner has repeatedly belittled Islam, saying: "Islam is not a religion. Islam is an inhumane totalitarian political ideology with radical religious rules and laws and barbaric punishments for breaking the religious rules. If Islam is a religion, it is a cult religion." Bruner also called for the U.S. to "ban Islam and stop all immigration from Muslim countries because Islam's stated goal is to conquer the USA and kill the infidels (nonbelievers)."
- Bruner believes that historians of the Civil War have "demonized" the South and has written that the dispute between North and South "was not about slavery" but instead "was about the railroad." Brunner has also written that "Abraham Lincoln is not the heroic icon figure which history has made of him." Bruner denigrated Lincoln as "dishonest" and accused President Obama of taking a page out of Lincoln's "playbook".
- Bruner told a radio show during her campaign: "The songs that they sing in the rap music, it's not correct grammar."
- Bruner sees a homosexual conspiracy in early childhood education programs (such as federally funded pre-kindergarten), stating in April 2016 that "GLBTQ agenda is one of the big reasons liberals want 3-year-old and 4-year-old children to attend public school Pre-K programs" and that pre-K programs teach children that "a homosexual marriage is just as good as a marriage with a father and a mother." Bruner claimed that children receiving this "indoctrination" will "become confused about their sexuality" and are "told their parents are bigoted because they do not accept Islam and gay marriage."
- Bruner has said on sex education: "Many of the (sexual education) books which teachers read to your small children are not allowed in jails and prisons because of the bad effect the books have on the prisoners. These books stimulate children to experiment with sex."
- Bruner believes that the Every Student Succeeds Act is unconstitutional. She believes that the Common Core State Standards, which are banned in Texas, have nevertheless been covertly introduced into Texas classrooms.
- Bruner has said that Texas schools should teach cursive handwriting, phonics, and multiplication tables, accusing "liberals" of wanting to eliminate such skills. Others have noted that the state curriculum already includes all of these skills.

=== Response ===
==== Support ====
Bruner attracted support from Don McLeroy, a former SBOE member who spent twelve years on the board, the last two as chairman. McLeroy was known for sowing doubt about the theory of evolution—until he was ousted in 2010 by Thomas Ratliff. McLeroy said: "I think she'll be a great asset. She testified all the time when I was on the board." Regardless, McLeroy urges Bruner to be "circumspect" in what she says and writes. "Back when I was on the board there were no tweets by Don McLeroy ... There's so much more that you can find about people today than there was back then."

==== Criticism ====
Bruner's comments attracted "widespread ridicule" and criticism, with one commentator calling her the "looniest politician in Texas." Comedian and television host John Oliver read aloud Bruner's statement that Noah took the small dinosaurs onto the ark and said that the Texas SBOE "is not known for having the least controversial personnel in the country, but she seems extreme even for them ... Crack a science book, lady."

== Personal life ==
Bruner and her husband Anthony live in rural Smith County near Mineola.
