= Autry Beamon =

American gridiron football player (born 1953)

Autry Beamon Jr.
No. 27, 24, 23
- Position: Safety

Personal information
- Born: November 12, 1953 (age 72); Terrell, Texas, U.S.
- Listed height: 6 ft 1 in (1.85 m)
- Listed weight: 190 lb (86 kg)

Career information
- High school: Kaufman (TX)
- College: East Texas
- NFL draft: 1975: 12th round, 311th overall pick

Career history
- Minnesota Vikings (1975–1976); Seattle Seahawks (1977–1979); Cleveland Browns (1980–1981)

Awards and highlights
- First-team Little All-American (1973)

Career NFL statistics
- Interceptions: 13
- Interception yards: 132
- Fumble recoveries: 8
- Sacks: 1
- Safeties: 1
- Stats at Pro Football Reference

Autry Beamon Jr. (born November 12, 1953) is an American former professional football player who was a safety for three teams in the National Football League (NFL). He played college football for the East Texas Lions.

== College career ==
Beamon played college football at East Texas State University (now East Texas A&M University) and is in the university's Athletic Hall of Fame. The Hall of Fame citation says that at age 16 he was the youngest college player in the country in 1970.

He is still the only player in his college's history to be a four-time first team All-Lone Star Conference selection.

He is in both the Lone Star Conference Hall of Honor and the Texas Black Sports Hall of Fame.

== Professional career ==
In the 1975 NFL draft, the Minnesota Vikings chose Beamon in the 12th round (311th overall). He was on the Vikings team that played in Super Bowl XI, losing to the then Oakland Raiders in January 1977.

In the course of his seven-year NFL career Beamon made 13 interceptions for 132 yards including a career best six picks in the 1977 season for the Seattle Seahawks. The following season he had four interceptions for the Seahawks. Only two players in the NFL — Rolland Lawrence of the Atlanta Falcons and Mario Clark of the Buffalo Bills — had more interceptions in each of those two seasons, 1977 and 1978.

Beamon had at least one fumble recovery in all but one of his seven NFL seasons for a career total of eight: three for the Vikings, three for the Seahawks and two for the Browns.

In 1977 Beamon scored his only NFL touchdown, returning a blocked punt in a Seahawks home game against the Baltimore Colts. His only other points in the NFL also came from a blocked punt for the Vikings in a home game against the New York Jets in 1975, resulting in a 2-point safety.

In both the 1978 and 1979 seasons he was the special teams captain for the Seahawks.
