= History of East Texas State College =

Early history of Texas A&M University–Commerce

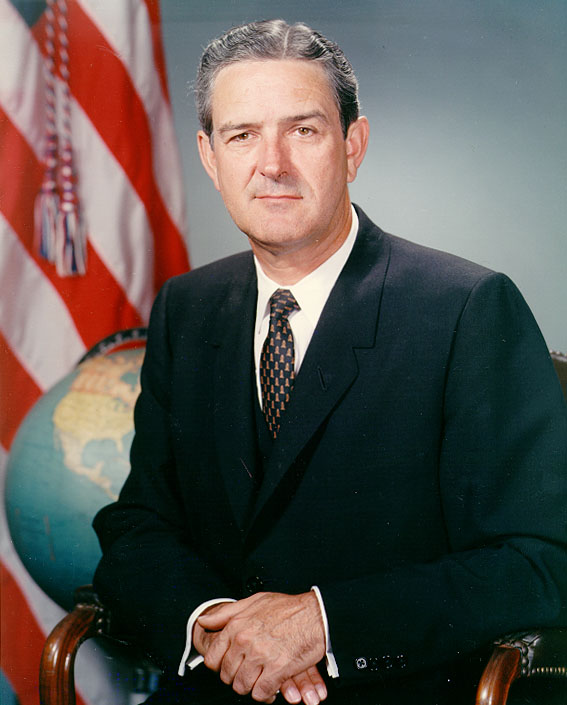
Governor John Connally, who signed House Bill 333 to rename East Texas State College as East Texas State University in 1965

The history of East Texas State College (ETSC) comprises the history of the university now known as East Texas A&M University from its renaming as East Texas State College by the Texas Legislature in 1957 (in recognition of the school's expansion beyond its original scope of teacher education) to its renaming as East Texas State University by Governor John Connally in 1965. The ETSC era witnessed substantial growth of both student enrollment (from approximately 3,100 students in 1958–59 to 6,810 in fall 1965) and the college's physical plant (a new library, student center, and multiple dormitories were built, and by 1966 the value of the school's buildings exceeded $22 million). Academic developments during this period were also significant, including the establishment of an honors program in 1961, the authorization to grant doctorates in English and education from 1962, and a continued increase in the percentage of ETSC professors holding Ph.D.s (reaching 58% in 1966, compared to roughly 45% in 1957).

ETSC notably integrated on June 6, 1964 when ordered to do so by the Board of Regents, and Velma Waters became the first African American undergraduate student at ETSC, while Charles Garwin became the first African American graduate student and the first to graduate (in January 1966). Homecoming and intramural sports were popular student activities during the ETSC era, while the school's intercollegiate athletics teams continued to have success, especially in men's golf, men's tennis, and men's track and field. Students were still subject to the principle of in loco parentis and its related curfews, dress codes, and strict enforcement of regulations, although they also enjoyed activities ranging from fads and pranks to officially condoned events such as Kappa Delta Pi's spelling bee and an antebellum-themed "Old South Week". 1959 alone also witnessed the lifting of a long-standing ban on national fraternities and sororities and the establishment of the Forum Arts Program that brought "distinguished speakers and cultural attractions" to campus.

== Growth ==
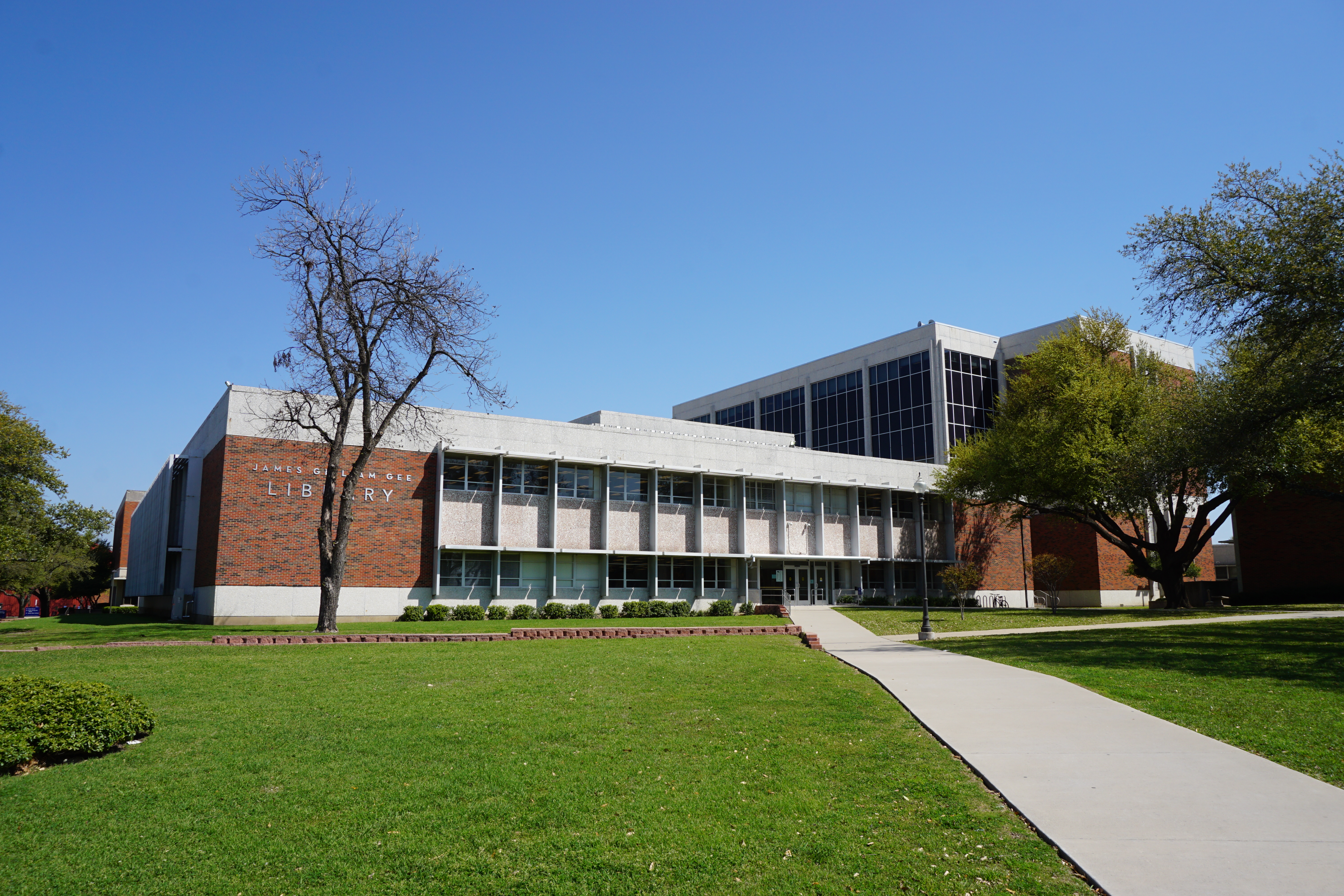
James G. Gee Library in 2016

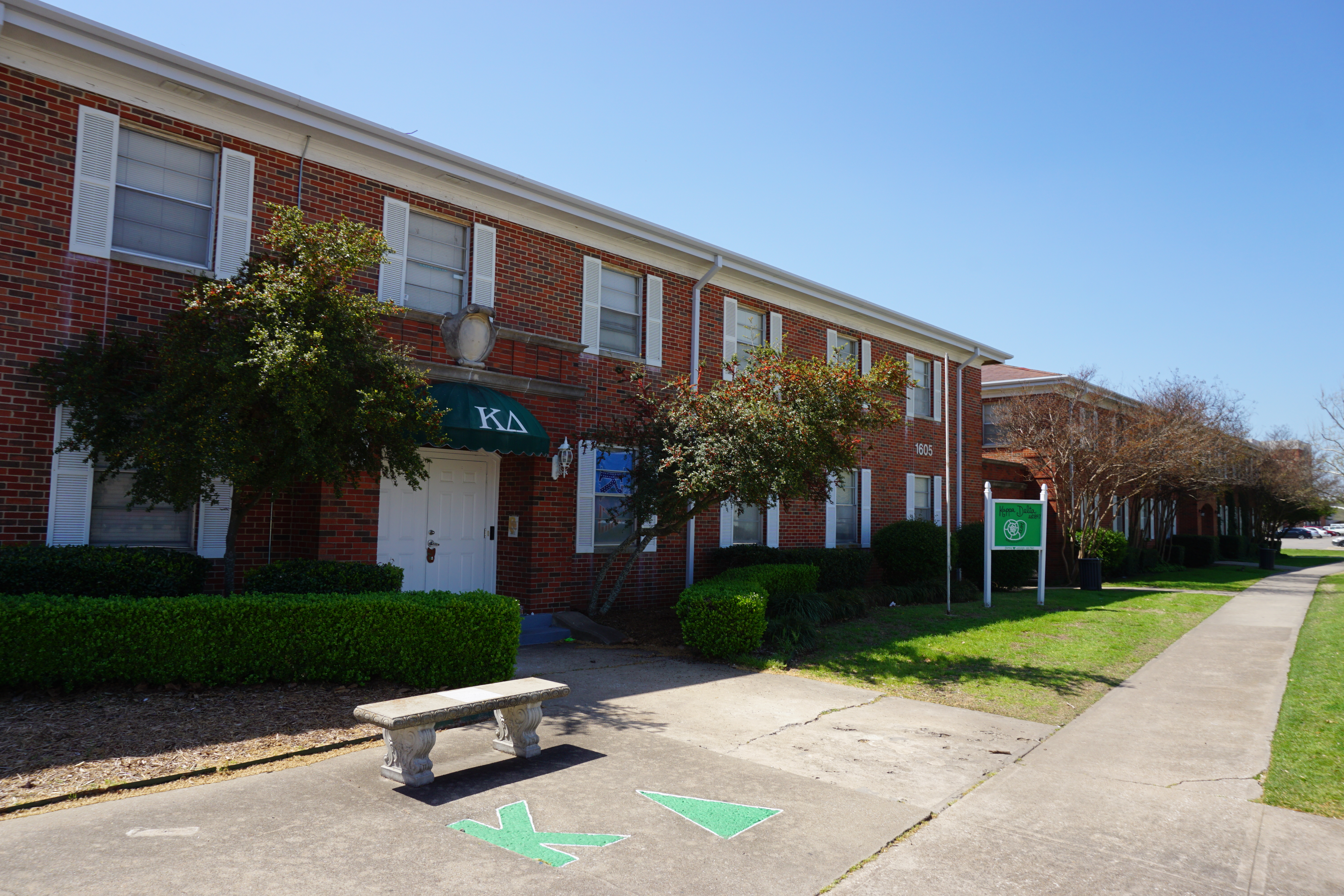
Sororities' & Women's Halls, with Kappa Delta in the foreground, in 2016

What is now Texas A&M University–Commerce was renamed East Texas State College (ETSC) in 1957, after the Texas Legislature recognized the broadening scope of the institution, in recognition of the school's expansion beyond its original mandate of teacher education. In 1958–59, ETSC's enrollment rose back to 1949 levels (over 3,100 students), before growing rapidly thanks to the baby boom, reaching 3,511 in fall 1961 and 6,810 in fall 1965. The number of degrees issued by the school fluctuated between 700 and 850 during the late 1950s and early 1960s, before rising to 1,562 in 1966–67. This growth occurred despite the rising cost of an education at the college (tuition grew from $32.50 throughout the 1930s to $42 in 1948 to $87 in 1966), although "a college education at ET continued to be a great bargain". In the mid-1960s, a full semester of room and board cost between $292 and $319, depending on the dormitory.

In 1959, ETSC built the James G. Gee Library, which cost over $1 million and provided capacity for approximately 200,000 volumes and 60,000 square feet (5,600 m^{2}) of floor space. ETSC also launched on an "ambitious" project to build 32 small dormitories in the late 1950s and early 1960s, mostly for married students and single men, although there was still a "severe shortage" of rooms available to single women. This squeeze was resolved, at least in part, by the construction of five new dormitories for the Alpha Delta Pi, Alpha Phi, Chi Omega, Gamma Phi Beta, and Kappa Delta sororities in 1962. Between 1962 and 1964, four additional dormitories, two each for female and male students, opened across Texas State Highway 50 on the west side of campus; the latter two were known as the New West Halls, although they were later renamed Sikes and Berry Halls. Perhaps the crowning achievement of the building program overseen by Gee was a new three-story student center, which included a bookstore, cafeteria, game room, and many meeting rooms, that was completed in 1963. Called by college historian William E. Sawyer the "Great Builder", Gee had increased the value of the school's physical plant from just over $2 million in 1947 to more than $22 million when he retired in 1966.

In 1961, the college implemented an honors program for top students, giving them the opportunity to take "specially designed core courses" and write an honors thesis under the mentorship of select faculty. Structural changes to the college begun under Gee in the 1940s also continued during the ETSC era, with the Speech program moving from the Department of Journalism and Speech to the Department of Speech and Drama in 1966. In 1964, the college bought approximately 850 acres (340 ha) of ranch land 2 miles (3.2 km) south of campus along Highway 50 that it had previously leased. Another major development occurred in 1962, when ETSC was authorized to grant doctorates by the Texas Commission on Higher Education, initially offering one in English and three in education. The trend of an increasing percentage of ETSC professors holding Ph.D.s continued during this era: it grew from roughly 45% in 1957 to 58% in 1966.

On March 30, 1965, Governor John Connally officially renamed the school East Texas State University by signing House Bill 333.

== Integration ==
Against a backdrop of widespread integration and previous refusals of applications from prospective African American students by ETSC and its predecessor East Texas State Teachers College (ETSTC) in the 1950s, by the early 1960s Gee realized that "he could not indefinitely delay the inevitable". In 1962, the staunch conservative and segregationist created a secret ad hoc committee that was charged with planning the peaceful desegregation of ETSC. Noting the difficulties caused by the piecemeal desegregation of the University of Texas at Austin, the committee recommended that, when ETSC finally desegregates, it should do so completely and entirely.

On June 6, 1964, the Board of Regents ordered the desegregation of all state colleges within the system, mandating that they admit "all qualified applicants, regardless of race". The decree only applied to ETSC and Sam Houston State College, the last two schools in the system that had not yet integrated.

In what history professor Donald E. Reynolds termed "the most statesmanlike address of his entire presidency", Gee informed all college employees of imminent integration at a meeting, stressing his expectation that everyone would comply entirely with the new policy. In his own words, he declared it "my devout wish and fervent prayer that the integration of this college will come about in an orderly manner".

Commerce resident Velma Waters became the first African American undergraduate student at ETSC, while Charles Garwin became the first African American graduate student and the first to graduate when he obtained his degree in January 1966. Waters recalled being "shunned by white students" and "victimized by biased white teachers", but she persevered and ultimately earned a bachelor's degree in 1968, by which time there were numerous African American students on campus.

== Athletics ==
Homecoming grew during the 1950s and early 1960s, with each year's festivities featuring a parade, a football game, and a homecoming dance. Intramural sports continued to be among the most popular student activities, and during this era they included women for the first time, although modern women's intercollegiate athletics would not exist at ETSC or its successor East Texas State University (ETSU) until the passage of Title IX in 1972.

After the "Golden Fifties" during which the school's football and men's basketball teams achieved unprecedented success, the ETSC Lions enjoyed continued athletic achievements: both men's golf and men's tennis won back-to-back Lone Star Conference championships in 1964 and 1965, while the men's track and field team amassed a total of 14 titles between 1947 and 1966.

== Student life ==
Long a part of the school's history, the principle of in loco parentis continued throughout the ETSC era. Curfews, dress codes, and strict enforcement of student regulations were a fact of life for all students, but they disproportionately affected women. In 1955, "good grooming" was a requirement that consisted, in part, of students exhibiting "no missing buttons, run-down heels, unbrushed clothes, unpolished shoes, neglected nails, or straggling coiffure". When attending classes in 1963, male students were required to wear sports wear or dress suits while their female counterparts had to dress in sports wear or tailored clothes. Nonetheless, an East Texan student newspaper survey conducted in the early 1960s found that female students "overwhelmingly approved of the...regulations which governed their dress and behavior".

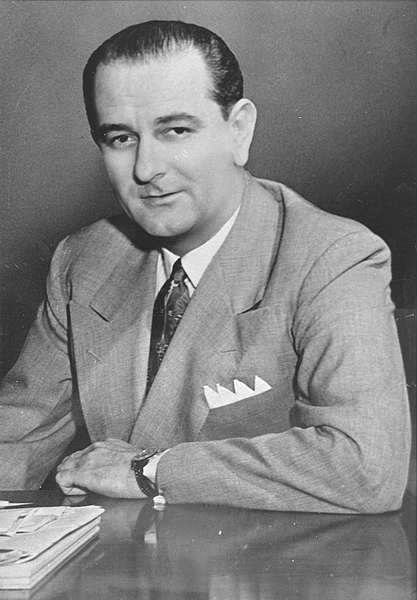
Lyndon B. Johnson while a senator from Texas, circa 1950s

Social events on campus also continued to evolve during the ETSC years. By 1964, one of the oldest of all school traditions, the Christmas carol service, included choirs from five area schools in addition to the ETSC choir, modern dance, a candlelight service, and an audience sing-along with the college orchestra. The campus was also the scene of many fads and pranks in the late 1950s and early 1960s, ranging from students cramming themselves into Volkswagen Beetles and egging fraternity houses to painting orange polka dots on the F-84G fighter jet on campus and panty raids involving up to 500 students. Other student activities on campus during this period were officially condoned by the administration, including Kappa Delta Pi's spelling bee, Alpha Phi Omega's "Ugly Man on Campus" contest, an antebellum-themed "Old South Week", and a Mexican-themed "Down South Week".

President Gee lifted a long-standing ban on national fraternities and sororities in 1959, and within two years almost all of the old men's and women's social clubs had affiliated with national Greek organizations. Of the men's organizations, Artema affiliated with Lambda Chi Alpha, the Cavaliers with Delta Tau Delta, Ogima (the oldest extant men's organization) with Pi Kappa Phi, Paragon with Kappa Alpha Order, and Tejas with Sigma Phi Epsilon. Of the women's organizations, Kaidishan affiliated with Kappa Delta, Kalir with Alpha Delta Pi, Les Choisites with Alpha Phi, Marpessa with Chi Omega, and Tooanoowe with Gamma Phi Beta.

In 1959, ETSC established the Forum Arts Program, which endeavored to bring "distinguished speakers and cultural attractions" to campus, and encouraged students to attend by granting them half a semester hour of credit for participating in the program. Among the luminaries who came to Commerce due to the Forum Arts Program were then-senator Lyndon B. Johnson, Austrian Chancellor Kurt Schuschnigg, writers Pearl S. Buck and Alex Haley, historians Henry Steele Commager and John H. Plumb, the Dallas Symphony Orchestra and San Antonio Symphony, the Ballet Folklórico de México, the José Limón Dance Company, the Preservation Hall Jazz Band of New Orleans, and the artist Hal Holbrook. In 1962, the author Flannery O'Connor spoke at ETSC.
