= Ugly man contest =

Parodic competition based on beauty pageants

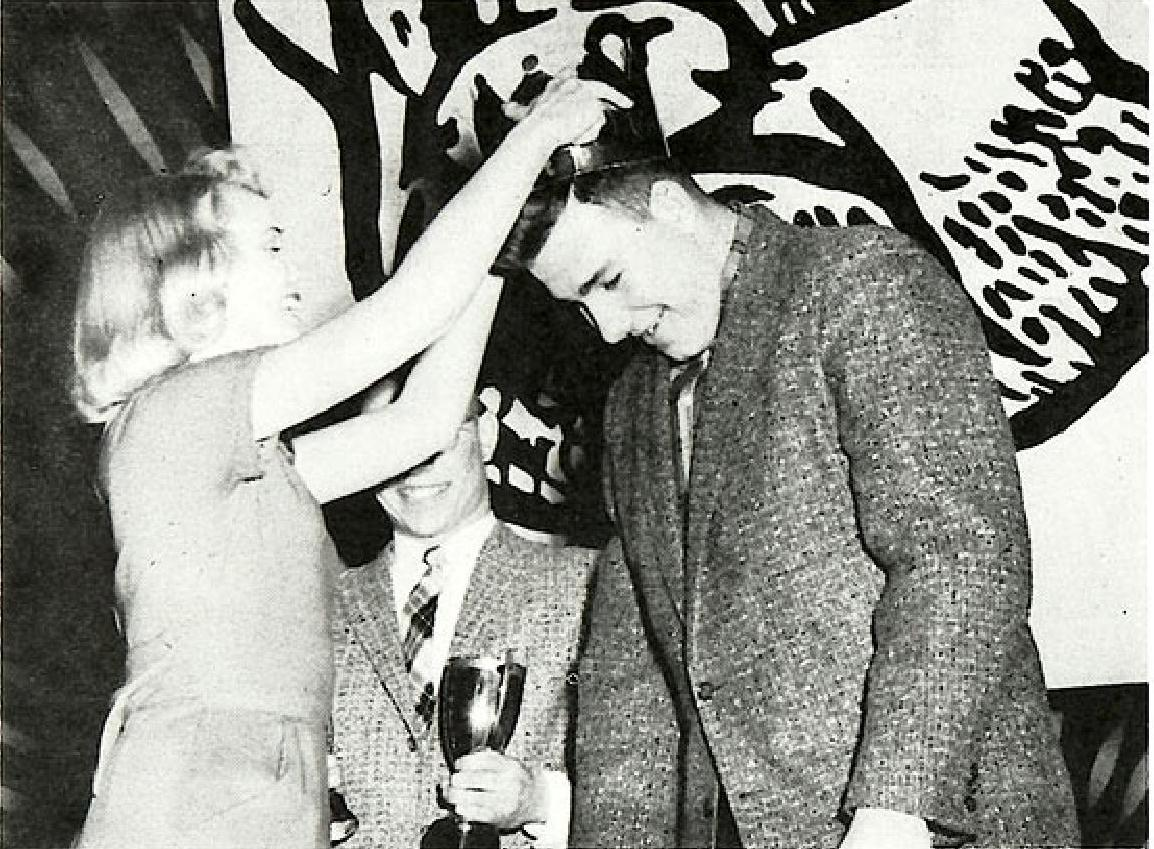
A member of the Augustana College chapter of the Alpha Phi Omega fraternity is crowned "Ugly Man on Campus" for 1958.

An ugly man contest is a competition which inverts the concept of a beauty contest by having men compete for the title of ugliest. Such contests were usually done in jest, and votes were more reflective of popularity rather than actual physical unattractiveness. The contests were used as a fundraising vehicle, charging money for each vote cast.

In Australia, a 1917 ugly man competition led to the formation of the Ugly Men's Voluntary Worker's Association of Western Australia Inc., a grassroots charitable organization which raised funds to help soldiers and their families in the aftermath of World War I.

Ugly man contests were a feature of box suppers (and similar events, such as pie suppers or ice cream suppers) in the United States, often coinciding with a parallel "pretty girl" contest.

Ugly man contests were regularly held on college campuses in the United States by fraternities, including Alpha Phi Omega, the largest fraternity in the United States. The APO tradition began at Georgia Tech, and by 1953 had spread to nearly every chapter in the country. In April 1991, a fraternity at George Mason University held an "ugly woman" contest, in which 18 fraternity members dressed in drag, with one also donning blackface. The incident caused controversy on campus, and led the dean to suspend the fraternity for two years, though this punishment was later overturned by a federal judge on First Amendment grounds.

== See also ==
- The Smallest Penis in Brooklyn pageant
