= Short Street =

Short Street may refer to the following places:

- Short Street, Fremantle, Western Australia, Australia
- Short Street, Wiltshire, a hamlet in Chapmanslade, Wiltshire, England
