= Mannings Folly =

Former building in Fremantle

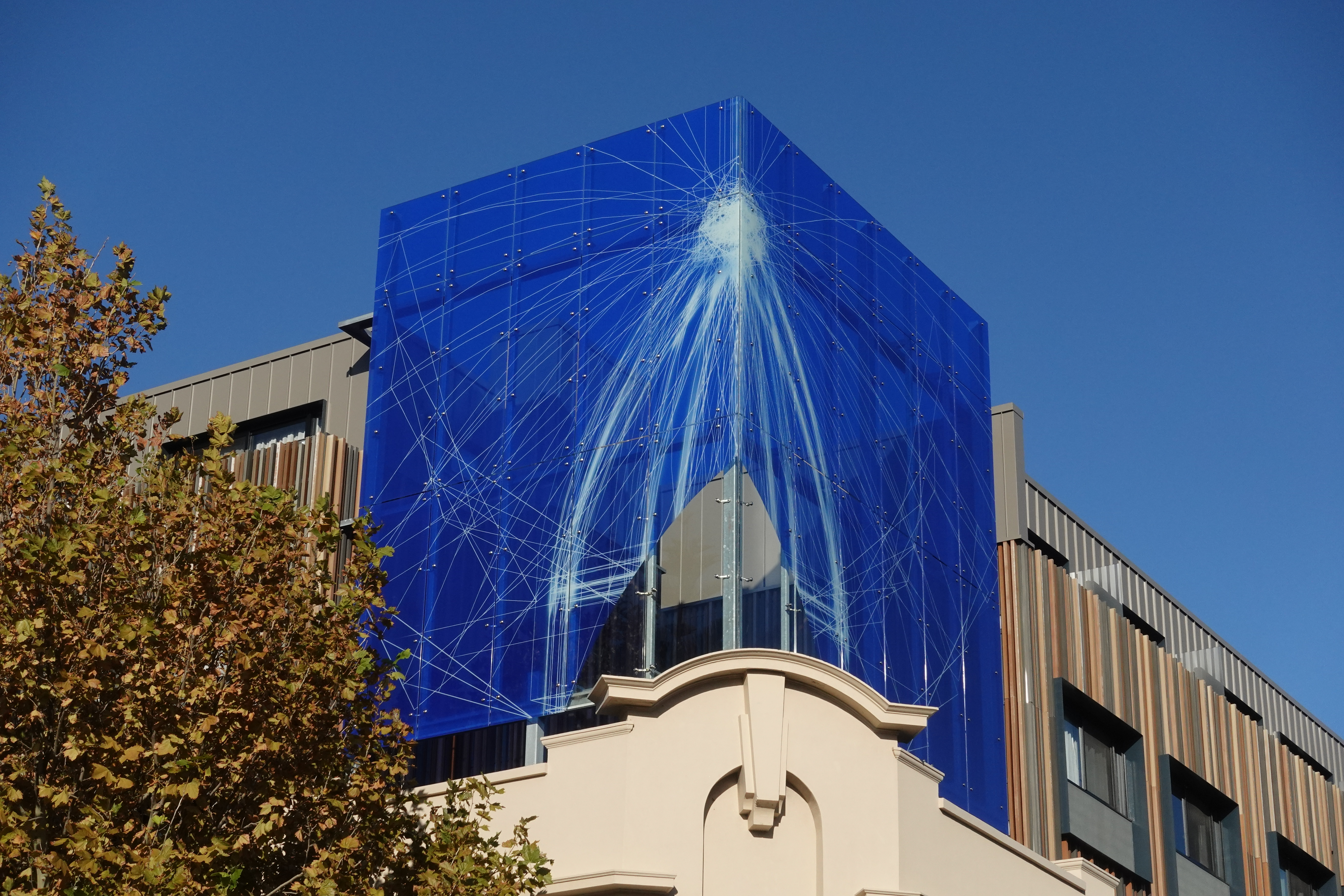
The 2016 artwork Folly of Follies by Lorenna Grant is on the site of Mannings Folly and is named after it.

Mannings Folly was a three-storey building located on the corner of Pakenham Street and Short Street, in Fremantle, Western Australia. It was erected in 1858 by Charles Alexander Manning as a hostel for Indian army officers and civil servants. The building was subsequently used as the Manning's private residence.

Manning, earlier a trader, was a chairman of the Fremantle Town Trust (1859–1867), and he lived in the building until he died in 1869. Manning was a passionate amateur astronomer

It was a prominent three-storey building on the Fremantle townscape, in the era that it existed.

A customs and shipping agent, John MacKnight, used the building between 1914 and 1924. It was demolished in May 1928, following a decision by the City of Fremantle to approve the demolition in March that year. It was replaced by a substantial warehouse.

The top of the folly was used by early photographers to capture images of parts of Fremantle and Fremantle Harbour.

It is currently the site of Quest Apartments.
