= Embassy Ballroom, Perth =

Demolished dance hall in Perth, Western Australia

Coordinates: 31°57′20″S 115°51′23″E

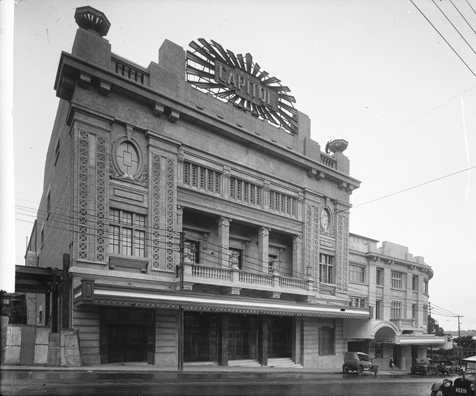
The Embassy building is the lower building to the right of the Capitol Theatre

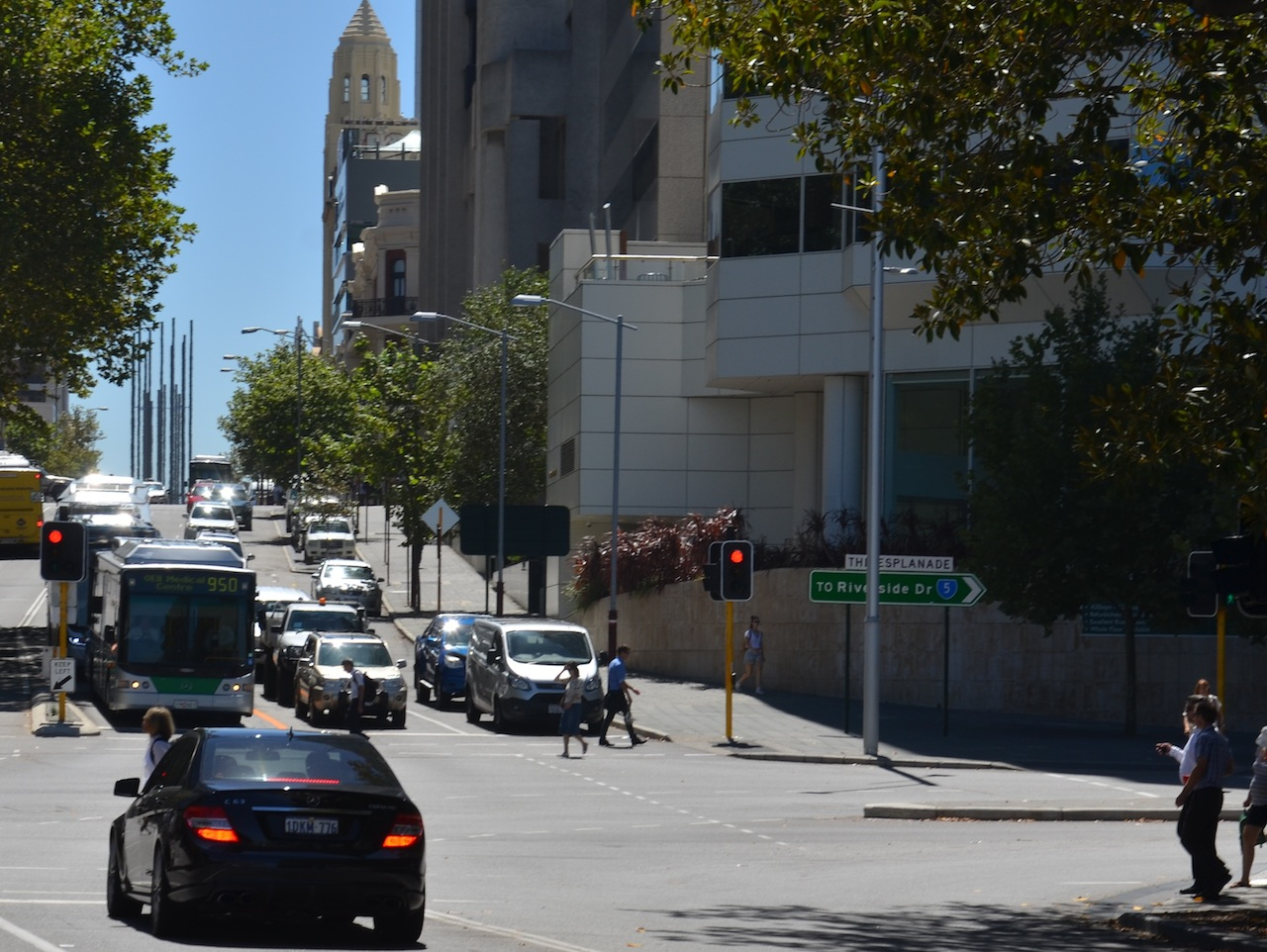
Current view of the site of the ballroom from south west, up William Street

Embassy Ballroom was a dance hall on the corner of William Street and The Esplanade in Perth, Western Australia that operated between 1928 and 1982.

== History ==
It was opened originally as the Temple Court Cabaret and Tea Rooms. The name Temple Court continued after the name change, with the building being known as Temple Court, and the ballroom itself being known as the Embassy. When established in 1928 it was across the road from White City and next door to the Capitol Theatre.

The Embassy had, at stages of its operation, its own cabaret events, with orchestra and dancers, called the Temple court ballet, as well as a band. The floor was 1,100 square metres (12,000 sq ft) of jarrah timber.

In the 1930s, most large department stores in Perth had staff balls at the Embassy. The building was affected by fire in 1933, but was repaired and re-opened the following year.

It was a well used venue during and after the Second World War. It continued to be a venue for a range of events well into the 1950s.

It was closed 26 November 1982 and demolished soon after.
