= History of East Texas State Teachers College =

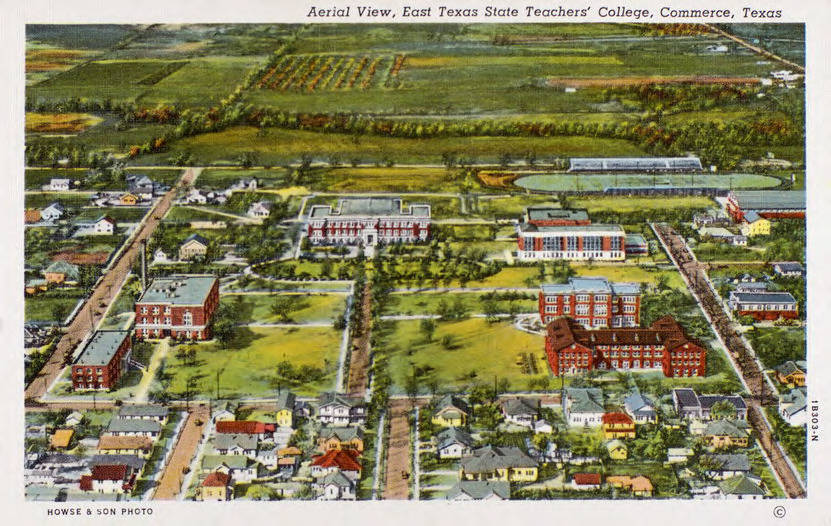
Aerial view of ETSTC in 1941

The history of East Texas State Teachers College (ETSTC) comprises the history of the university now known as East Texas A&M University from its renaming as East Texas State Teachers College in 1923 (to define its purpose "more clearly") to its renaming as East Texas State College in 1957 (to recognize its broadening scope). During this era, ETSTC was led by four different presidents (Randolph B. Binnion, Samuel H. Whitley, A. C. Ferguson, and James Gilliam Gee), two of whom (Whitley and Gee) served for more than a decade. The ETSTC period was marked by increasing recognition, notably through obtaining membership in the Southern Association of Colleges and Schools (SACS) in 1925, as well as marked growth in its faculty, student enrollment, and physical plant. ETSTC grew from 65 faculty in 1925 to 132 in 1957, from approximately 1,000 students in 1925 to over 3,000 in 1958–59, and from six buildings valued at roughly $500,000 in the early 1920s to a physical plant valued at over $4 million in 1949.

While in the early 1920s ETSTC's faculty lacked advanced degrees and was relatively poorly compensated, by 1927 a majority of the faculty held degrees higher than bachelor's degrees and by 1957, 59 of its 132 faculty members held doctorates. All four ETSTC presidents exerted a marked conservative influence on the campus; during his presidency, for instance, Whitley disapproved of smoking and refused to hire married women. The ETSTC era also included the Great Depression, which witnessed a steep drop in enrollment and federal student aid principally from the Federal Emergency Relief Administration (FERA) and the National Youth Administration (NYA), and World War II, which saw the campus host the Women's Army Auxiliary Corps (WAAC), the Army Specialized Training Program (ASTP), and the Civilian Pilot Training Program, while 63 former students were killed in the conflict.

The post-World War II era at ETSTC was marked by a return to growth, in terms of the faculty, student enrollment, and physical plant alike. New dormitories and athletics buildings, including Memorial Stadium and the Field House, were built during this period. Gee's tenure as president, which began in 1947, included two major controversies: his feud with Sam Rayburn, the congressman representing Hunt County and an alumnus of the college, and his support of a doctrinaire general studies program that angered and alienated numerous faculty and resulted in the demotion of two "dissident" department heads. Gee also was able to block integration from occurring at East Texas State for much of his presidency; the college would not integrate until forced to do so by the Board of Regents in 1964.

The ETSTC era was also a banner period for athletics, as the school joined the Lone Star Conference (LSC) as a founding member in 1931, while during the "Golden Fifties" both the football and men's basketball teams won multiple conference championships, and the basketball team won the NAIA national basketball tournament in 1954–55. The 1920s and 1930s have been referred to as the "truly golden age" of student clubs at East Texas State, and despite the vast majority of the student body having $5 or less in spending money a month in 1925, students found creative and inexpensive forms of recreation, from attending theaters and dating to attending college-sponsored events such as Saturday night dances and appearances by noted performing artists such as John Philip Sousa and the United States Marine Band as well as noted speakers such as Frances Perkins, Emily Post, and Carl Sandburg.

== 1920s ==
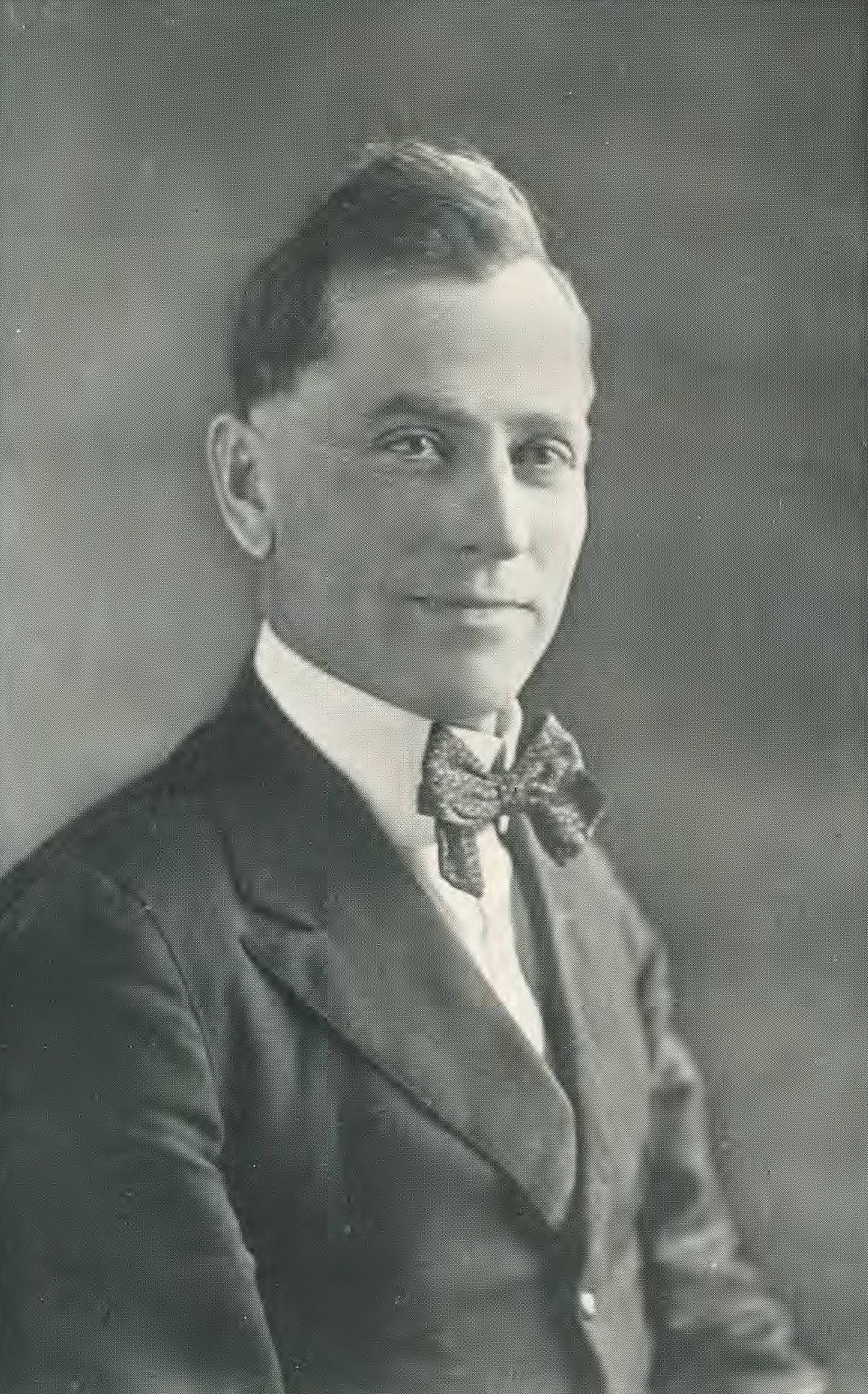
Samuel H. Whitley in 1921, then the Dean of the Faculty

East Texas State Normal College (ETSNC) was renamed East Texas State Teachers College (ETSTC) in 1923, to define its purpose "more clearly". In 1925, the college became a true four-year institution when its "sub-college" program was transferred to its training school; however, it was slow in gaining respect from the University of Texas at Austin, which refused to accept ETSTC credits beyond the sophomore level at face value until 1922. Even before being fully recognized by UT Austin, though, East Texas State students had gained admission at various other prestigious universities, including the University of Chicago, Peabody College, Vanderbilt University, and Yale University. Furthermore, in 1925 ETSTC was granted membership in the Southern Association of Colleges and Schools (SACS), "the South's major accrediting agency for institutions of higher learning".

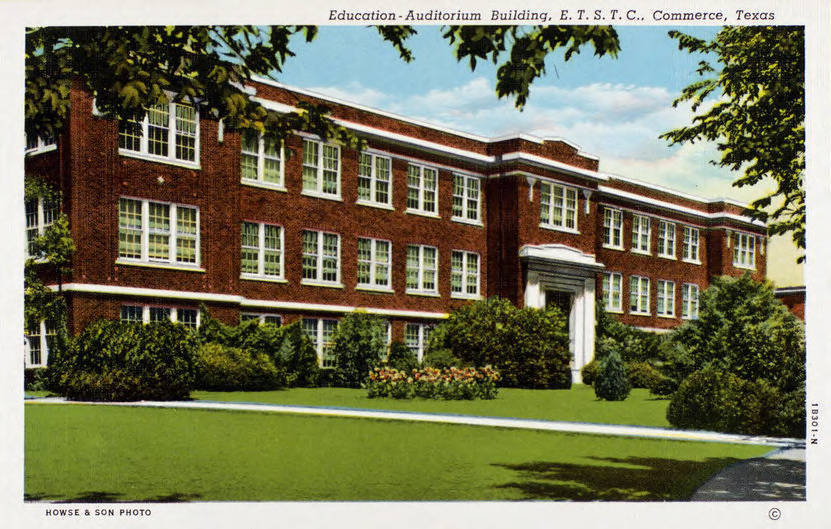
Education Building in 1941

On November 20, 1924, President Randolph B. Binnion resigned the presidency to become provost at George Peabody College for Teachers in Nashville, Tennessee, and the board of regents selected Samuel H. Whitley as his successor. Whitley was the Dean of the Faculty at ETSTC and a professor of mathematics at the time of his selection, prior to which he had been a high school principal in Corsicana and, briefly, Assistant State Superintendent. Whitley was inaugurated as ETSTC's third president on January 16, 1926, the same day as the dedication of the Education Building, the first campus building to be paid for by state funds. The building was constructed with an appropriation of $285,000 from the Texas Legislature and was built by the Jones Construction Company of San Antonio; it featured a 2,500-seat auditorium and originally included 35 classrooms. It was later renamed the Arthur C. Ferguson Social Sciences Building and, as of 1993, was still one of the most-used buildings on campus. By that year, all of the buildings constructed during the presidencies of Mayo and Binnion had been demolished and replaced, leaving the Ferguson Social Sciences Building as the oldest structure still standing on campus.

Like Binnion before him, Whitley subscribed to a conception of "normalism" that was similar to Mayo's, which helped ease the presidential transition. Under Whitley, the college's student population increased, eclipsing 1,000 in 1925 before reaching 1,953 during the 1932–33 school year. State funds failed to keep up with enrollment growth, however, rising only slightly from $253,060 during the 1926–27 academic year to $265,950 in 1932–33. Another challenge facing ETSTC during the 1920s and 1930s was the state of its physical plant; aside from the new Education Building, many campus buildings were in poor condition, especially Industrial Hall and Old Main (which were eventually demolished in 1941 and the early 1950s, respectively). New buildings were constructed to address this issue during the Whitley administration: in 1927, a new two-story, colonial-style president's home was built for Whitley just to the south of the Education Building, and in 1929–30 the school's first dedicated library was constructed, featuring room for 125,000 volumes and a showpiece two-story, 40-foot (12 m) reading room. The library also included classrooms and a museum, and featured such ornate details as dark oak woodwork and bronze chandeliers.

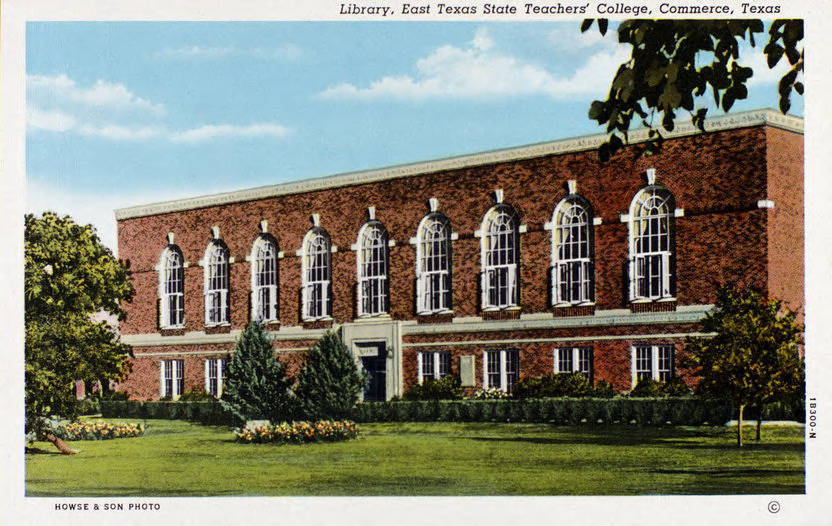
The original library in 1941

Just before Whitley became president in 1925, ETSTC employed a total of 65 faculty, which grew to 80 by the 1932–33 academic year. Historian of the university William E. Sawyer described the teaching loads for the 1925 summer normal institute as "excessive": one single teacher was assigned to teach agriculture, physical geography, physiology, and zoology, while another teacher taught ancient history, modern history, Texas history, United States history, and school law. However, due to the relative paucity of the school's budget, salaries remained low: during the early 1930s, department heads were paid $3,600 annually, but salaries as low as $2,500 for associate professors, $1,800 for instructors, and $728 for maintenance staff were recorded. in 1926, the Texas State Finance Committee had set the salary for all the presidents of the state teachers colleges at $5,000, along with a residence. In 1931, Whitley admitted that ETSTC's salary scale was "lower than...any other state institution".

Furthermore, in 1932, the school began giving employment preference to native Texans and adopted a policy of not employing more than one member of any family. According to history professor Donald E. Reynolds, ETSTC was "reported to have the lowest cost per student in the state", and a 1933 report on the school by the Southern Association of Colleges and Secondary Schools found that it only spent $160 per student, additionally noting that both its library and faculty were undersized and "somewhat below average" in comparison to comparable schools. In 1938, no raises were given to faculty, and equipment budgets were drastically cut, from $4,500 to $1,800 for the chemistry department and from $9,200 to $3,800 for the industrial education department. By 1940, ETSTC employed 135 teaching faculty.

Reynolds argued that "academic standards had risen faster nationally...than they had at ET", and noted that in 1925, ETSTC employed more faculty members with no college degrees or only bachelor's degrees than with master's degrees. That year also marked the hiring of Rural Education department head Albert S. Blankenship, the school's first member of the faculty to have earned a doctorate. To address this general lack of credentials at ETSTC, Whitley implemented a policy of hiring and retaining only faculty members who had obtained advanced degrees, which resulted in a majority of the faculty holding degrees higher than bachelor's degrees by 1927 and, by 1933, 8 faculty with doctorates, 72 with master's degrees, and just 6 with less than a master's degree (either a bachelor's degree or no degree at all). Whitley once confided: "I am doing my durndest to shake this old faculty up here, so that some of them will get Ph. D.'s but I am having the dickens of a time of it".

In addition to academic credentials, Whitley also stressed "proper" behavior, albeit not as strictly as Binnion: while he did not officially disapprove of dancing as his predecessor did, Whitley did disapprove of smoking, refused to hire married women, and was displeased with the thought of his faculty spending their weekends in area cities perceived to be more "liberal" than Commerce. According to Sawyer, however, at least one teacher was fired and multiple female students dismissed for dancing during Binnion's presidency.

During the 1923–24 academic year, ETSTC was offering 370 classes in 23 different disciplines, compared to 156 in 17 subjects when it became a state school in 1917. Additionally, the high school-level "sub-college" program was gradually phased out during this period, as it was reduced to only the senior level of high school in the late 1920s and was completely eliminated in 1931. Other structural changes during the ETSTC era came from the state government in Austin, including a shift from Mayo's old quarter system to semesters and more stringent requirements for prospective teachers and the programs that educated them, including a new statewide policy effective from 1934–35 that required teachers employed by schools receiving state aid "to have a minimum of two years college training and to hold a State teaching certificate".

== Great Depression ==
The reverberations of the Great Depression struck Texas and its economy in earnest during the 1932–33 academic year, with the State Legislature reducing ETSTC's budget for that year by over $35,000; over a three-year period, the school's total budget was reduced by over 25%. Although Whitely did not resort to mass layoffs, he did drastically reduce salaries (faculty saw a 25% reduction in their compensation in fall 1934), while he himself lost his life's saving in failed banks.

The Great Depression also decimated enrollment at ETSTC: in 1933–34, it dropped by 40%, from 1,953 to 1,168 students. At the time, there were a limited number of scholarships provided by the state (notably for high school valedictorians, as well as free tuition for Spanish–American War and World War I veterans), while there were some campus jobs available to students, including in the library and cafeteria. More substantive relief for students was provided by Franklin D. Roosevelt's New Deal programs, including the Federal Emergency Relief Administration (FERA) and the Civil Works Administration (CWA), two "Hundred Days Congress" programs implemented in time for the 1933–34 academic year. FERA provided roughly 100 student jobs in 1934, which allowed students to work 55 hours a month for $0.30 an hour for a total of $15 a month; 12% of students secured part-time jobs that year. By 1935, the Public Works Administration (PWA), the Works Progress Administration (WPA), and the National Youth Administration (NYA) also provided employment assistance.

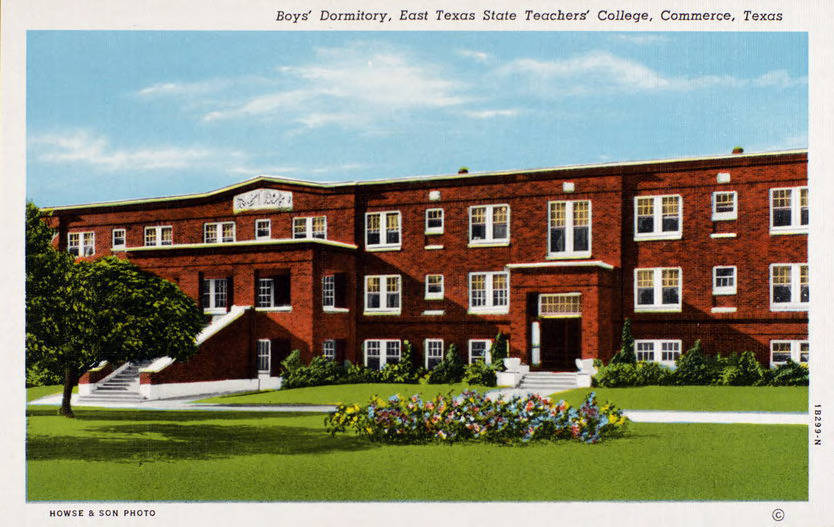
Mayo Hall (Boys' Dormitory) in 1941

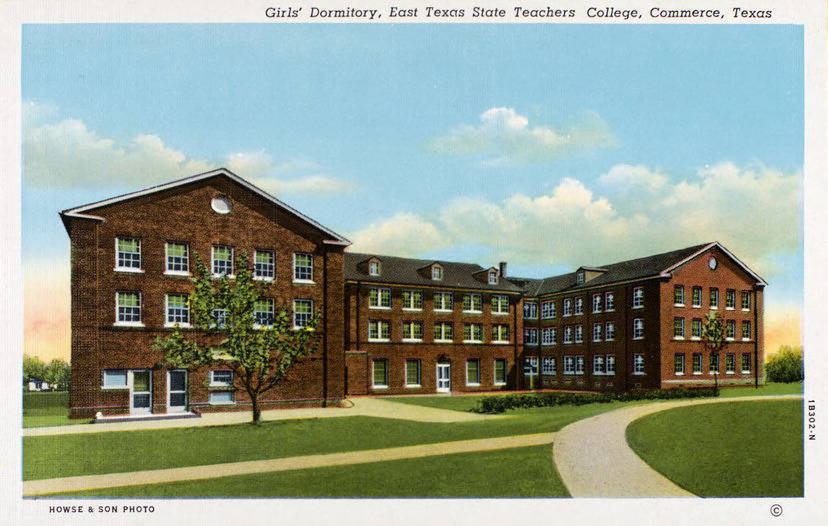
East Dormitory (Girls' Dormitory) in 1941

The NYA provided between 87 and 144 jobs every year between 1935 and 1940. By 1942–43, its final year, the NYA only employed 72 students, most of whom were employed in the library, physical education department, or the registrar's office. Furthermore, thanks to $106,000 from the PWA and a $108,000 federal grant, respectively, ETSTC was able to build Mayo Hall (a men's dormitory) in 1935 and East Dormitory (for women, later renamed Henderson Hall) in 1939. Other campus buildings built during Whitley's presidency included Whitley Gymnasium in 1935, a new football and track stadium in 1936, a new Science and Industrial Building, and a home management house in 1936.

In 1930, the Board of Regents allowed the teachers colleges in the state to offer master's degrees. Despite Whitley's opposition to the idea of graduate programs as late as 1932, at which time he argued that "our problems have been greatly agitated by introducing graduate work into the teachers colleges at this time", ETSTC began its graduate education program in 1935. At its inception, master's programs were only offered in education, English, and history, and both the M.A. and M.S. degrees required 30 hours of graduate course work as well as a thesis; the only major difference was that the M.A. had a mandatory language requirement.

During the 1930s, room and board in private homes averaged $15 a month, although a room could be found for rent for just $5, not including food costs (which could range between $1 and $12.50 per month). For female students, room and board at ETSTC's East Dormitory cost $20 per month, while West Dormitory charged as little as $14 a month after it became a cooperative. Room rent in a dormitory for male students was $8.50. Throughout the 1930s, full term tuition and fees totaled $34.50, or $16.50 for a six-week summer session. For comparison, In 1923 there was no tuition, but there was a blanket tax of $9 and a matriculation fee of $8 for the summer term; textbooks were free.

== World War II ==
After the Japanese attack on Pearl Harbor, at a December 10, 1941 assembly President Whitley advised ETSTC students to continue "getting an education until duty calls to something else". Students and faculty did everything from joining the military (including the WAVES for women) and coordinating Red Cross drives and morale committees to teaching courses on subjects such as first aid, maximizing food production, and Morse code. Numerous social fixtures at ETSTC were suspended during World War II, from Sadie Hawkins Day to intramural sports to the Locust student yearbook, although women's clubs remained active, often by buying war bonds and donating blood. In March 1942, the college was selected as a "war information center" in its region of the state. In 1943, ETSTC hosted approximately 300 women of the Women's Army Auxiliary Corps (WAAC), and later that year it did the same for a company of the Army Specialized Training Program (ASTP), which numbered 200 men in the 1943–44 term. ETSTC also participated in the Civilian Pilot Training Program beginning in 1940; 63 of its students went on to serve in the Army, and another 28 in the Navy. By the time the war ended in August 1945, 63 former students had been killed in the line of duty.

== Post–World War II ==
In fall 1945, ETSTC's enrollment nearly doubled to 1,205, up from 633 the previous year. During the 1947–48 academic year, ETSTC's enrollment was 1,593. By fall 1949, enrollment reached a peak of 3,167, thus growing fivefold in only six years. This boom was partially fueled by the Servicemen's Readjustment Act, often referred to as the "G.I. Bill", under which the Veterans Administration paid tuition and fees, including the cost of books and supplies, for veterans up to a limit of $500 per academic year. After peaking in 1949–50, student enrollment dropped to 2,162 in fall 1953, before recovering to 1949 levels in 1958–59.

Facing a housing shortage as enrollment surged, Whitley turned to makeshift solutions, acquiring 20 prefabricated army dwellings from Camp Maxey in Paris for student housing. Despite these and an additional 54 "hutments" provided by the federal government, approximately 600 prospective students were turned away due to lack of housing in 1946–47. Academic buildings were also needed, and during the end of his tenure Whitley had plans for new dormitories, a new women's gymnasium, a 10,000-seat stadium, and a swimming pool. A drive to fund the new stadium, which was conceived as a memorial for the ETSTC students who died in World War II, was organized by local businessman and Ex-Students Association president Noble Arthur, who asked each faculty member to donate $75 to the effort.

President Whitley, within three years of the mandatory retirement age of 70, died suddenly of a heart attack while on a hunting trip on October 2, 1946, sending "a shocked campus and community into mourning". During his 27 years at the college, the campus expanded from 41 acres (17 ha) to 191 acres (77 ha), while the number of buildings doubled from 6 to 12 and their value more than doubled from approximately $500,000 to more than $1 million. His immediate replacement was an interim, A. C. Ferguson, the dean of the college for the past 22 years. The University of Texas Ph.D. was selected both to ensure continuity with Whitley's administration, and for his age: at 69, he was a year away from mandatory retirement and could not be selected as a permanent president, thus simplifying the board of regent's choice.

On September 1, 1947, Ferguson officially retired and James Gilliam Gee was inaugurated president of ETSTC, the fifth in the school's history. Regarded by Reynolds as, with the possible exception of Mayo, "unquestionably the most individualistic president" in school history, Gee's style was one of involvement, engagement, and impulsiveness. He was a graduate of Clemson University, Cornell University, and Peabody College, a veteran of two world wars who had risen to the rank of colonel as a staff officer under George S. Patton, and the dean and (briefly) acting president of Sam Houston State Teachers College. While recognizing the primary importance of ETSTC's mission as a teacher training college, Gee also stressed the importance of "liberal, pre-professional education for occupations other than teaching".

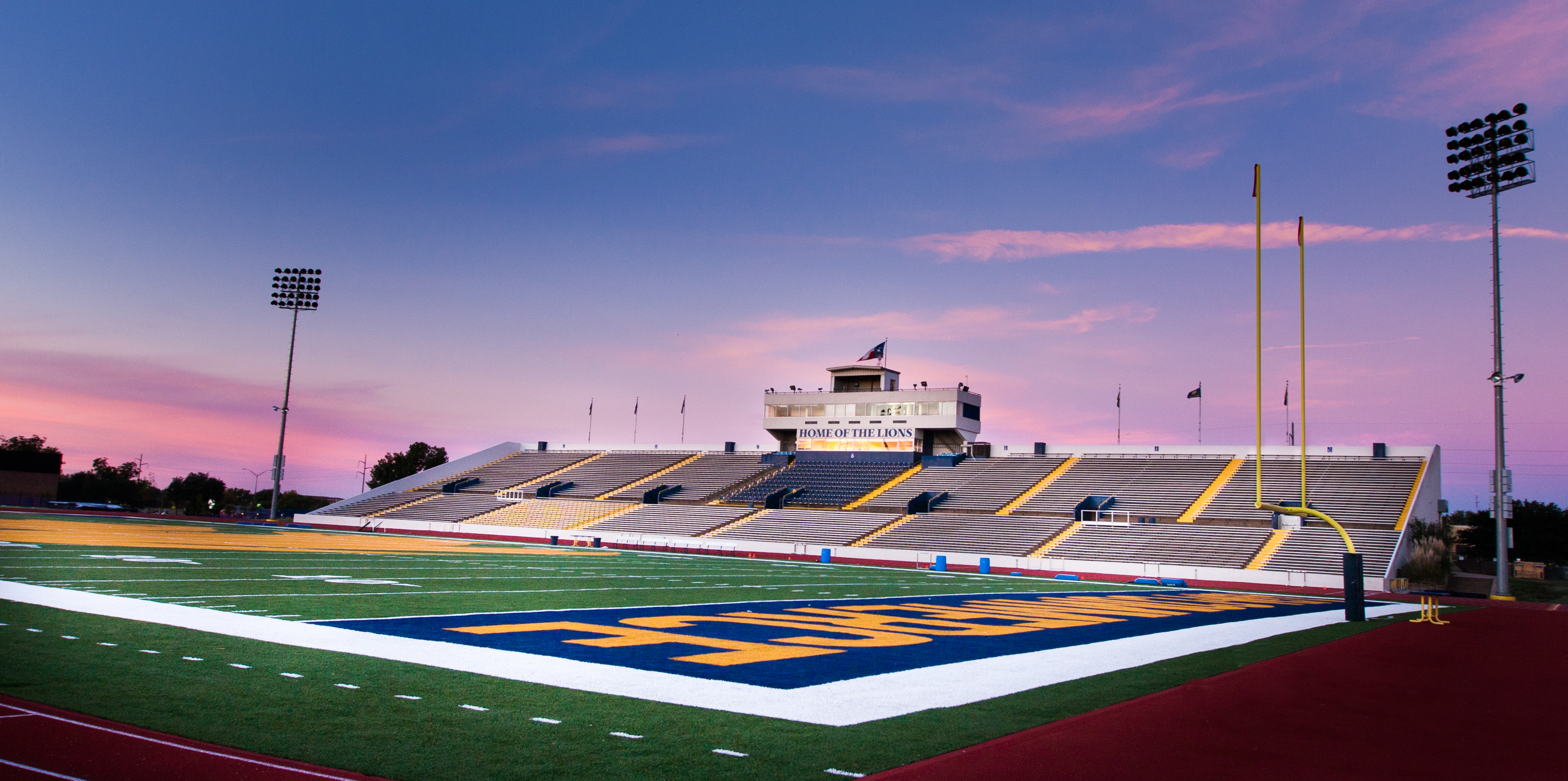
Memorial Stadium in 2013

As Whitley had done before him, Gee prioritized the building of sorely needed new residential and academic buildings, first buying over 300 acres (120 ha) of land for expansion of the physical plant; by 1948, he had led the construction of three new buildings: Binnion Hall (a women's dormitory), Central Cafeteria, and a student center built from pieces of a prefabricated army service club from Camp Maxey. By the end of the academic year another new building, journalism and speech's Dealey Hall, joined them, more than doubling the value of ETSTC's physical plant (to $4,140,000, from $1,800,000). 1950 and 1951 also witnessed major growth, especially for athletic buildings: Memorial Stadium, the Field House, and a swimming pool were all built, in addition to a new administration building that later became Education North. The "building spree" continued throughout the 1950s, as numerous academic departments, ranging from Agriculture and Audio-Visual Education to Industrial Education and Music, moved into new buildings.

Gee spearheaded numerous changes to the college's programs in addition to its physical plant. He shut down the ETSTC training school in 1948, after it had served as "a laboratory for the teacher-training program" since the college became a state institution in 1917. He also terminated the Department of Rural Education and moved most of its courses into the Department of Education in 1948, the same year that Journalism was moved out of the Department of English and joined with Speech to form a new Department of Journalism and Speech. In 1952, ETSTC created a School of Education that grew throughout the decade, with Audio-Visual Education being elevated to departmental status in 1956.

One of Gee's main initiatives as president was to increase the number of faculty members holding Ph.D.s. When he was named president in 1947, only 21 of the 111 faculty held doctorate degrees (70 had master's degrees), while just 8 of 24 department heads had Ph.D.s. Gee implemented a policy of only hiring professors who already held doctorate degrees or who promised to him that they would work toward them, and he even threatened currently employed faculty who did not make progress toward a Ph.D. with demotion. By 1957, 59 of ETSTC's 132 faculty members held doctorates. One especially notable faculty member of the period was historian Louis R. Harlan, a noted biographer of Booker T. Washington; he was a professor at the college between 1950 and 1959 who was advised by Nannie Tilley prior to teaching at the University of Cincinnati and the University of Maryland.

Gee was known for taking a hard line with his faculty, holding them to a dress code, requiring them to attend mandatory meetings, and preventing them from owning a business in addition to working for the college, which was a common previous practice. While a stickler for detail and at times petty, he was a staunch supporter of academic freedom. According to Reynolds, "even his enemies never accused him of punishing a single teacher for what they taught".

ETSTC was renamed East Texas State College in 1957, after the Texas Legislature recognized the broadening scope of the institution.

== Controversies ==
=== Gee–Rayburn feud ===
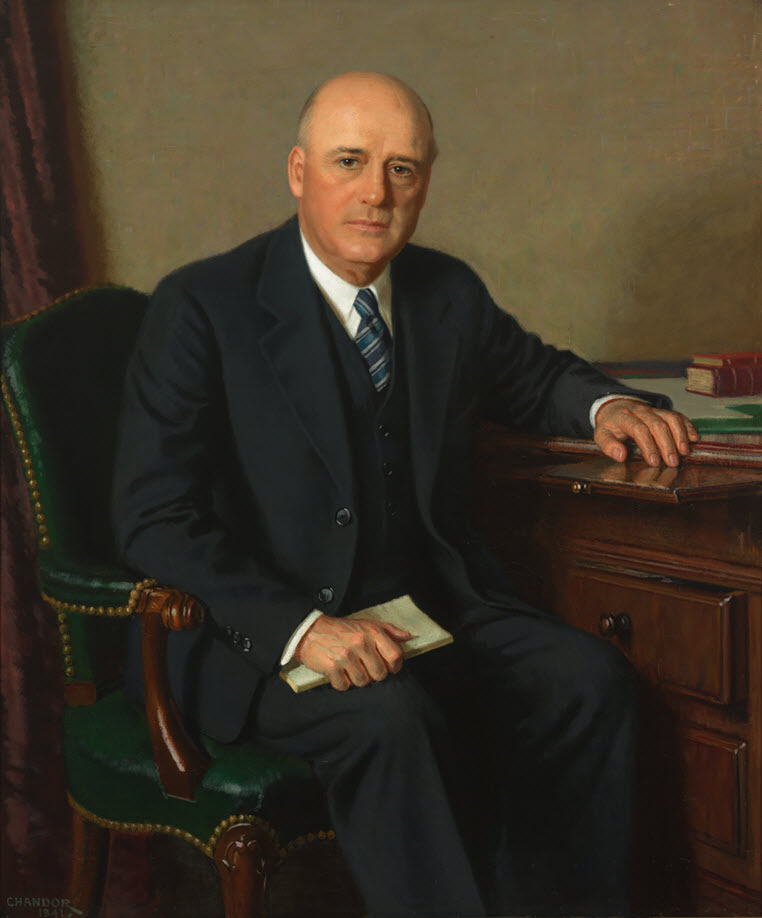
Sam Rayburn

With his blunt, direct, and at times profane style, Gee was no stranger to creating enemies and sparking controversies. One of the great controversies of his tenure as president was his feud with Sam Rayburn, the congressman representing Hunt County and an alumnus of the college; the feud apparently began with the conservative and segregationist Gee's opposition to the changes in the Democratic Party and Rayburn's apparent support for them, especially the New Deal and the President's Committee on Civil Rights, appointed by Harry S. Truman in 1946. In 1948, Gee backed G. C. Morris of Greenville, then a state senator, in his effort to defeat Rayburn in the 1948 Democratic primary. While Morris had demonstrated strong support for higher education while serving in Austin, Reynolds declared Gee's decision "a daring gamble to support the opponent of one who was arguably the most powerful man in Congress and indisputably ET's most distinguished alumnus". Despite Gee helping to organize a "Morris-For-Congress Club" and even dropping campaign fliers from an airplane over Commerce and Greenville, Rayburn won the primary handily, leading many to fear that the congressman might retaliate against Gee. Although he declared "I didn't want anything to do with Gee", Rayburn developed a relationship with Frank Young, the Dean of the College, and in 1949 and 1950 helped ETSTC obtain an Air Force Reserve Officer Training Corps unit and funding for a new vocational agriculture program.

The rift between Gee and Rayburn never healed: years later, Gee called Rayburn "my personal enemy" during a faculty meeting, and after learning of Rayburn's death he remarked that some on campus complained that "I had not bowed the knee in an appropriate manner to the pseudo-deity that some would make of our politically distinguished and recently deceased alumnus". Gee's animosity towards Rayburn even extended to the sign on the new Sam Rayburn Memorial Student Center on campus, which read simply "Memorial Student Center" throughout his presidency, and may have prevented the college from obtaining the Sam Rayburn Library, which was instead established in Bonham.

=== General studies program ===
Another major controversy involving Gee was the general studies program, which began with a recommendation from the Texas Education Agency that teacher education programs include more liberal arts in their curricula. After convening in 1951, a faculty steering committee addressing the issue delivered its recommendations in 1955: a core curriculum emphasizing "democratic values" that consisted of 14 courses in the liberal arts, sciences, and social sciences that would be required for all ETSTC students during their freshman and sophomore years.

The controversy began in earnest when V. Clyde Arnspiger was named director of the general studies program in 1955 and developed a list of eight values (power, respect, wealth, enlightenment, skill, well-being, rectitude, and affection) which he contended should be the framework for all general studies courses, which angered and alienated many of the faculty. According to Sawyer, Gee "insisted that every course must be taught with a utilitarian objective". The committee and Gee fully supported Arnspiger and his framework, but there were dissidents: most notably two department heads, Nannie Tilley of History and L. D. Parsons of Chemistry, as well as an unconfirmed story about a music professor who sarcastically demonstrated "how a Bach fugue exemplified Arnspiger's eight values".

After sharp criticism of the program was published in Greenville's Herald-Banner and The Dallas Morning News (which lampooned it as a "sort of tossed salad with sociology as a Thousand Islands dressing") and an anti-general studies demonstration was organized by students in fall 1957, the controversy reached fever pitch in spring 1958 when Gee, supported by the Board of Regents, removed Tilley and Parsons from their positions as department heads. However, the administration then quickly retreated from Arnspiger's doctrinaire approach to the framework, and after 1958 it made no substantive effort to force faculty to abide by it. An investigation by the Board of Regents into the general studies program revealed no wrongdoing, and in June 1958 Arnspiger even received a citation from the Shattuck School in Faribault, Minnesota, that proclaimed the "ETSC General Studies Program...has been commended by Eastern and Northern educators".

== Segregation ==
President Gee was a staunch segregationist who prevented integration at East Texas State for much of his presidency. After a Supreme Court decision that ruled against the segregation of the University of Texas School of Law in 1950 and the landmark Brown v. Board of Education ruling in 1954, Gee had refused to admit African Americans who applied, claiming that the Board of Regents and the Constitution of Texas had mandated that those of different races "must be segregated". ETSTC was one of the last three State Teachers College System institutions to integrate, as both Sam Houston State Teachers College in Huntsville and Stephen F. Austin State College in Nacogdoches also refused to admit African Americans who applied for admission starting in 1954. As framed by historian Amilcar Shabazz, the key question facing university, system, and state officials at the time was "how long should they trample the constitutional rights of blacks to appease white supremacists". Gee "dug in his heels" on the issue of integration and declared that he had "no other alternative" than to do what the Texas State Teachers College Board of Regents mandated; the college would not integrate until forced to do so by the Board of Regents in 1964.

== Athletics ==
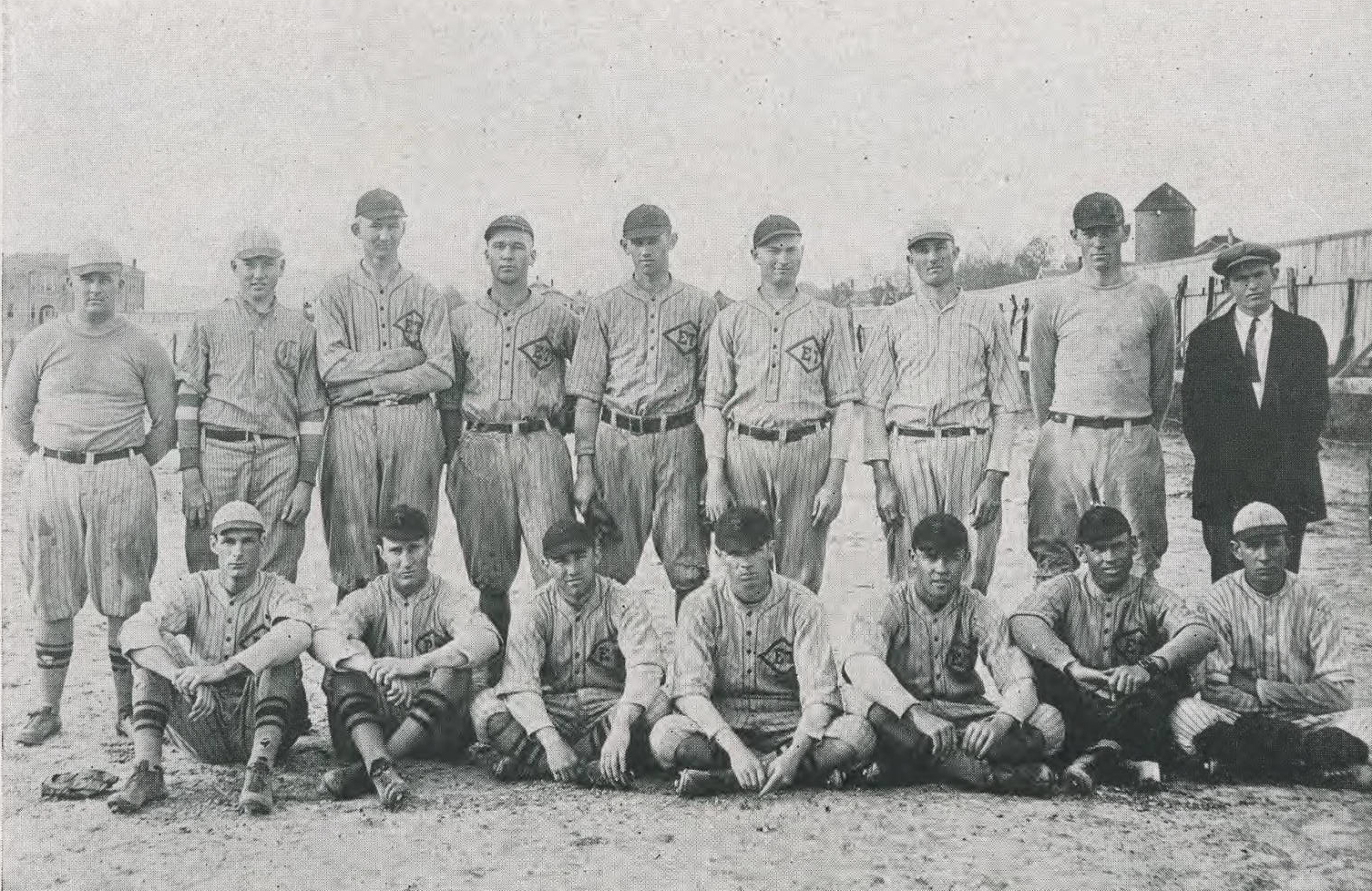
The 1923 East Texas State Lions baseball team

Intercollegiate athletics were a bright spot during the ETSTC era. The school's baseball team won several Texas Intercollegiate Athletic Association titles in the 1920s before the program was dropped in 1930 for financial reasons. The 1930s were also a banner decade for sports at ETSTC. After the state board of education required public schools to offer physical education in 1930, ETSTC's Department of Physical Education began offering majors for both men and women in 1931, and Glenn "Brush" Maloney was named the school's first director of intramural sports that year, although women were not included in the intramural program. While 169 male students participated in intramural basketball alone in 1939, female students organized a Physical Education Club and Women's Athletic Association.

In 1931, ETSTC joined the Lone Star Conference (LSC) as a founding member, in which it competed in men's basketball, football, tennis, and track. The Lions football team was particularly successful, winning five LSC championships and a share of a sixth between 1933 and 1943. The 1934 team, considered "one of ET's greatest" by Reynolds and "the institution's first truly great team" by Sawyer, finished the season undefeated and untied, conceding a total of only six points against. The football team was well supported by the student body during this period, drawing attendances of up to 10,000 at home as well as road support in Abilene, San Marcos, and (especially) Denton, the home of ETSTC's archrival, North Texas State Teachers College (NTSTC). NTSTC students and alumni also traveled to Commerce to attend football games against ETSTC. The budget for men's athletics grew from $27,050 in 1935–36 to $47,291 in 1940–41, while only $56.80 was spent on women's athletics in 1940–41, which in Reynolds' words "graphically illustrated that...intercollegiate sports was still the exclusive preserve of the male".

After finishing in second place in the LSC in 1946 and winning the conference championship in 1949, the football team won five straight conference championships from 1951 to 1955. The "Golden Fifties" also applied to men's basketball, which after winning shares of the LSC conference title in 1947–48 and 1949–50, won or shared conference championships five times between 1952–53 and 1957–58. The team also won the NAIA national basketball tournament in 1954–55.

== Student life ==
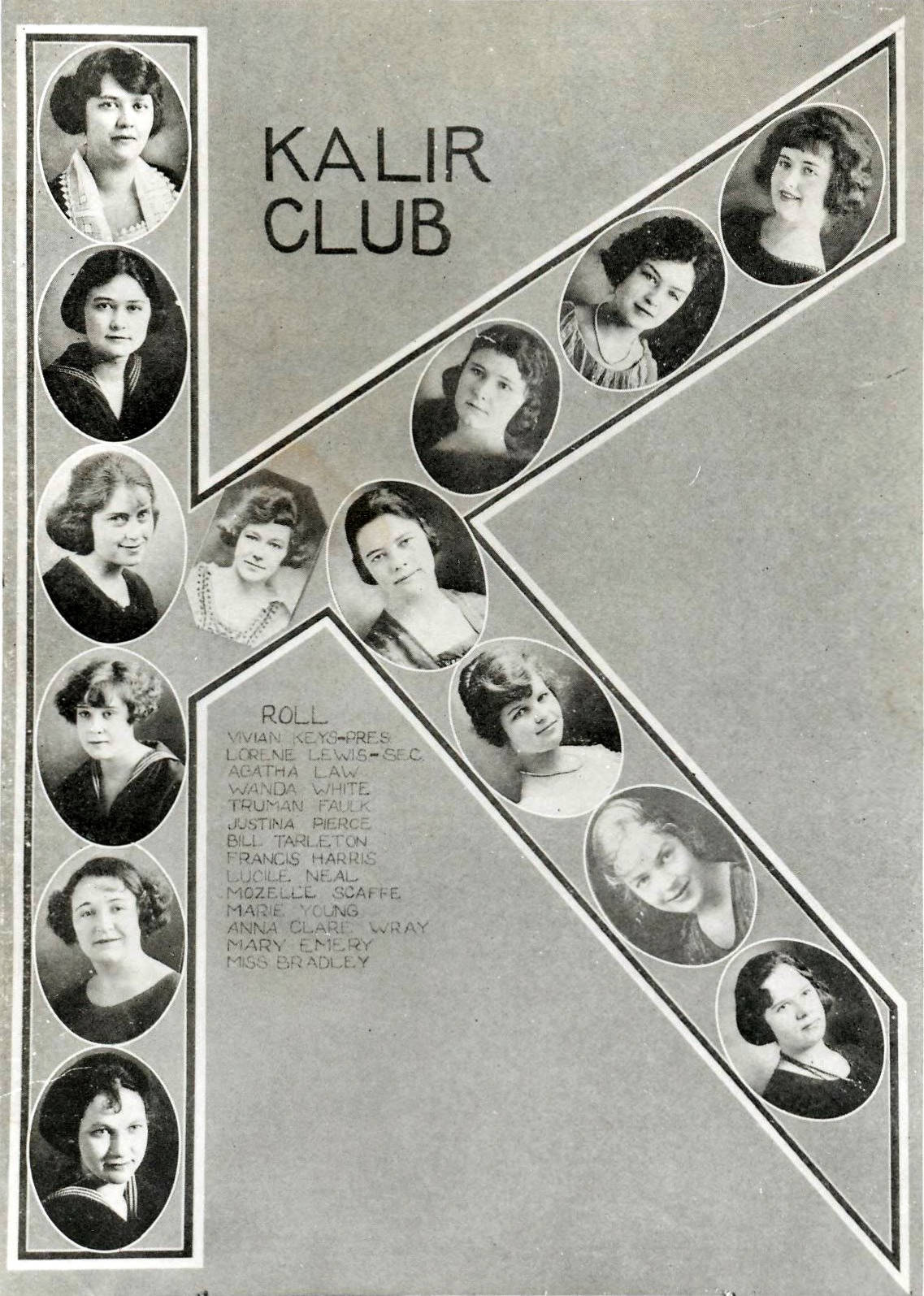
Kalir Club in 1923

The 1920s and 1930s have been referred to as the "truly golden age" of student clubs at East Texas State. Among the most notable of the clubs during this period were the free-spirited and unusual Mystic Order of the Slippery Ten, which was organized in 1923, and the Ogima Current Events Society for Young Men, which became the first club on campus to be sanctioned by the administration when it was founded in 1926.

During Binnion's tenure as president, female students were barred from eating at either men's boarding houses or at downtown restaurants. Sawyer described him as "terribly overprotective of girls". General social conservatism persisted into Ferguson's presidency, as a June 1947 poll of female students revealed that less than 1% of them believed that they should be permitted to wear shorts "anywhere [they] wanted to".

Although a 1935 survey revealed that 94% of the student body had $5 or less in spending money a month, local attractions such as theaters, cafés, hamburger stands, and soda fountains proved popular. In 1938, more than half of the college's students were working their way through their education. A 1941 survey demonstrated that only 30% of students regularly attended church services, although the college Sunday school class offered by the First Baptist Church was so well attended in the 1930s (sometimes by as many as 350 students) that it was taught in a theater in downtown Commerce. Car excursions and alcohol were also popular among ETSTC students in the 1930s, especially when Paris legalized alcohol after Prohibition was repealed in 1933, although drinking and smoking (as well as breaking curfew for female students) were cause for suspension or even expulsion.

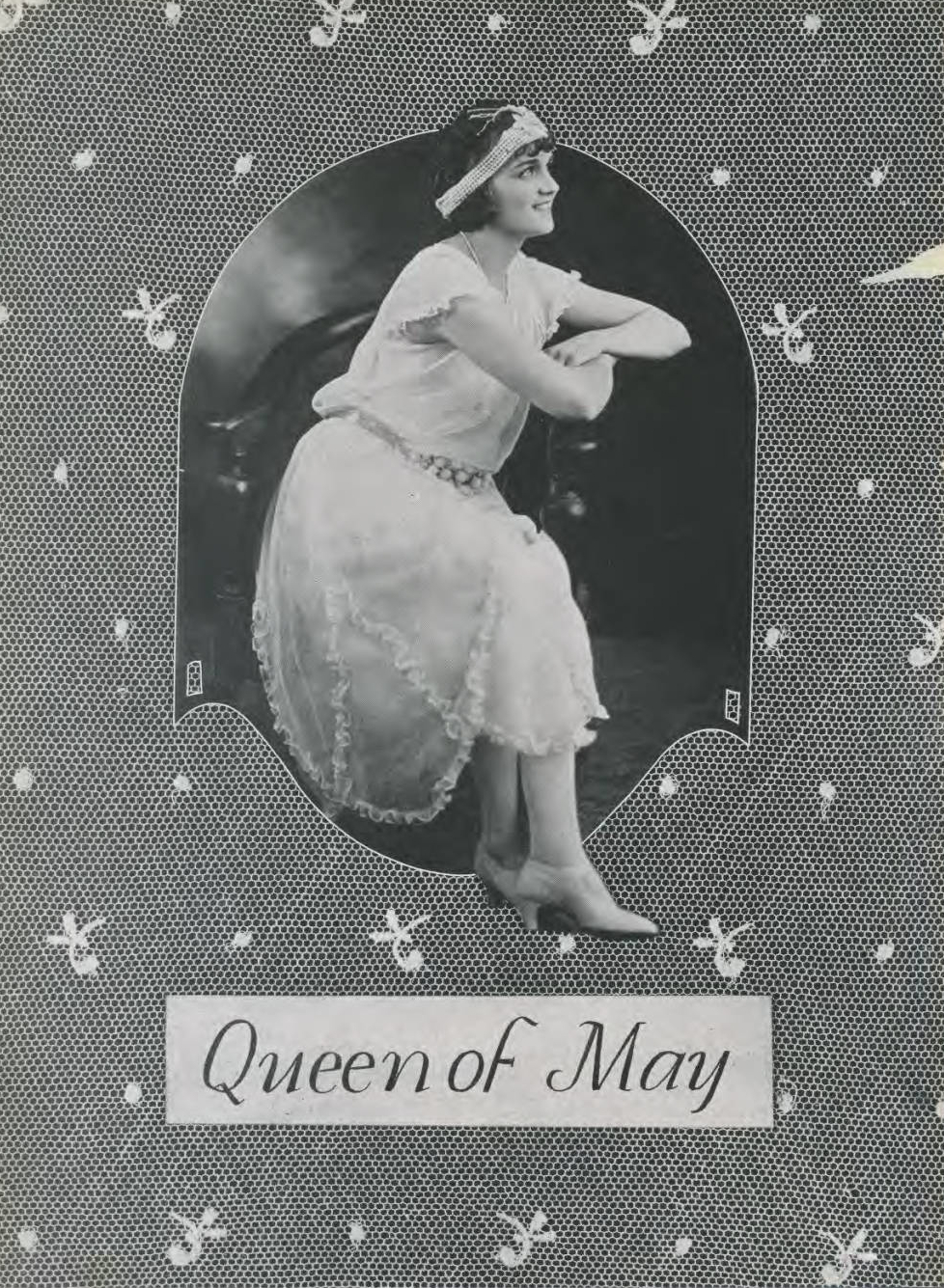
Queen of May, 1923

Dating was also popular among students: it was enabled by an extension of the curfew for female students from 8pm to 11pm, and often took place at soda fountains, theaters, or churches, not to mention a variety of creative locations chosen for their privacy, including cars, the city park, or even cemeteries. Student clubs and Saturday night dances (which were hosted in the library's reading room) also provided inexpensive entertainment for the student body; one dance was even played by Lawrence Welk and his band, before they attained major fame. Annual events were also very popular, especially Sadie Hawkins Day and the "May Fete", a springtime precursor of the modern homecoming.

During the 1920s and 1930s, ETSTC also provided its students with a wide range of cultural opportunities, both in the form of performing artists such as John Philip Sousa, the United States Marine Band, and the Boston English Opera Company, as well as noted speakers such as Frances Perkins, Emily Post, and Carl Sandburg. Public figures such as Governor James V. Allred and Senator A. M. Aikin Jr. also spoke at "chapel", which had significantly changed since the Mayo days: it was only held twice weekly (instead of daily), was voluntary, and "had long since lost any spiritual connotation".

Student activities evolved after World War II, with a lackluster effort to revive Sadie Hawkins Day in 1945 preceding the more successful "Western Week" and "Orphan's Christmas", which debuted in 1947 and 1948, respectively. Homecoming, which had traditionally been celebrated in the spring as "May Fete", was moved to the fall in 1949 to correspond with a football game, which increased student participation.
