= Ugly Men's Association =

Western Australian fund-raising and charitable organisation

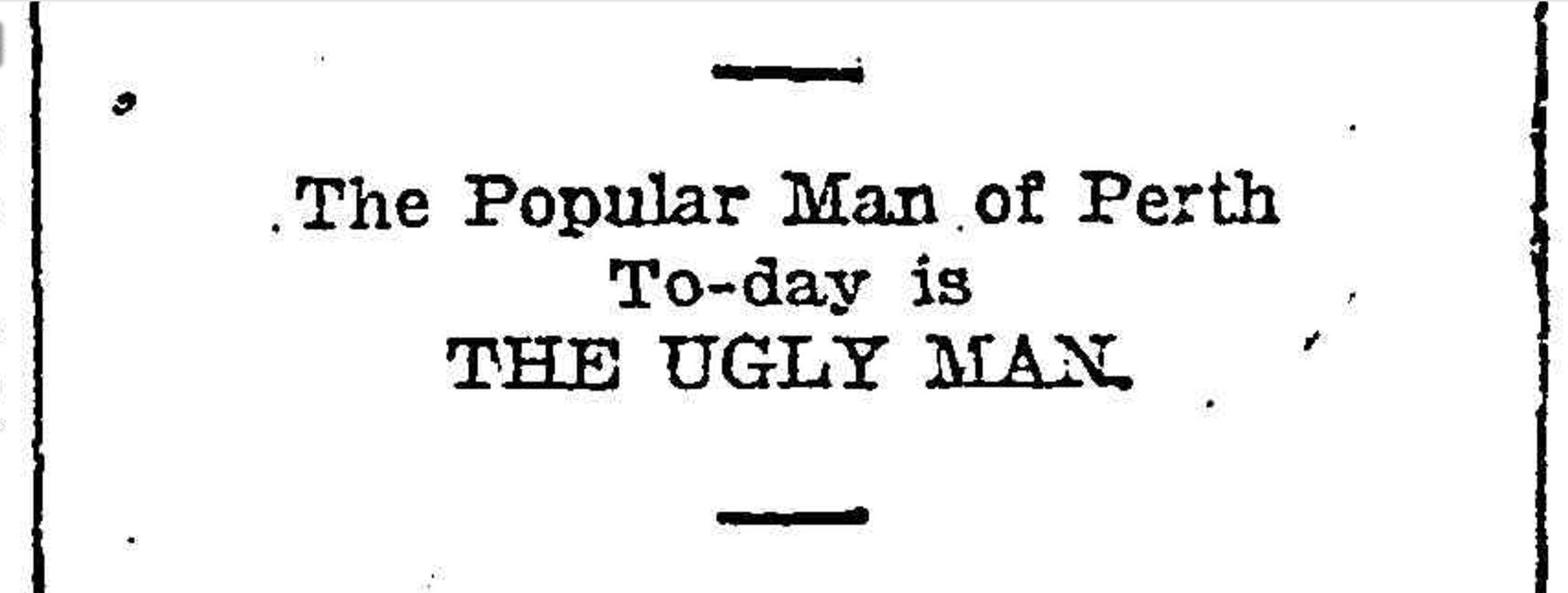
Part of an Ugly Men's Association newspaper advertisement published in the Daily News on 16 February 1917

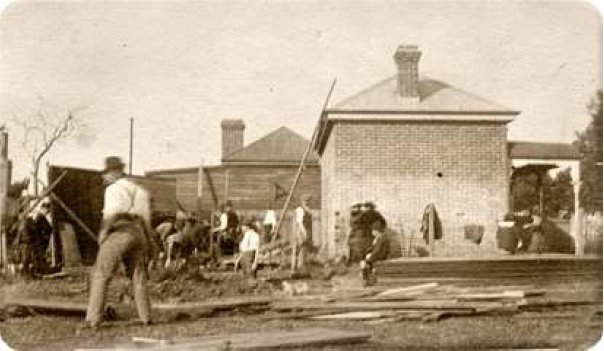
Members of the Ugly Men's Association building an extension to a house owned by a WW1 prisoner of war in North Perth in about 1919

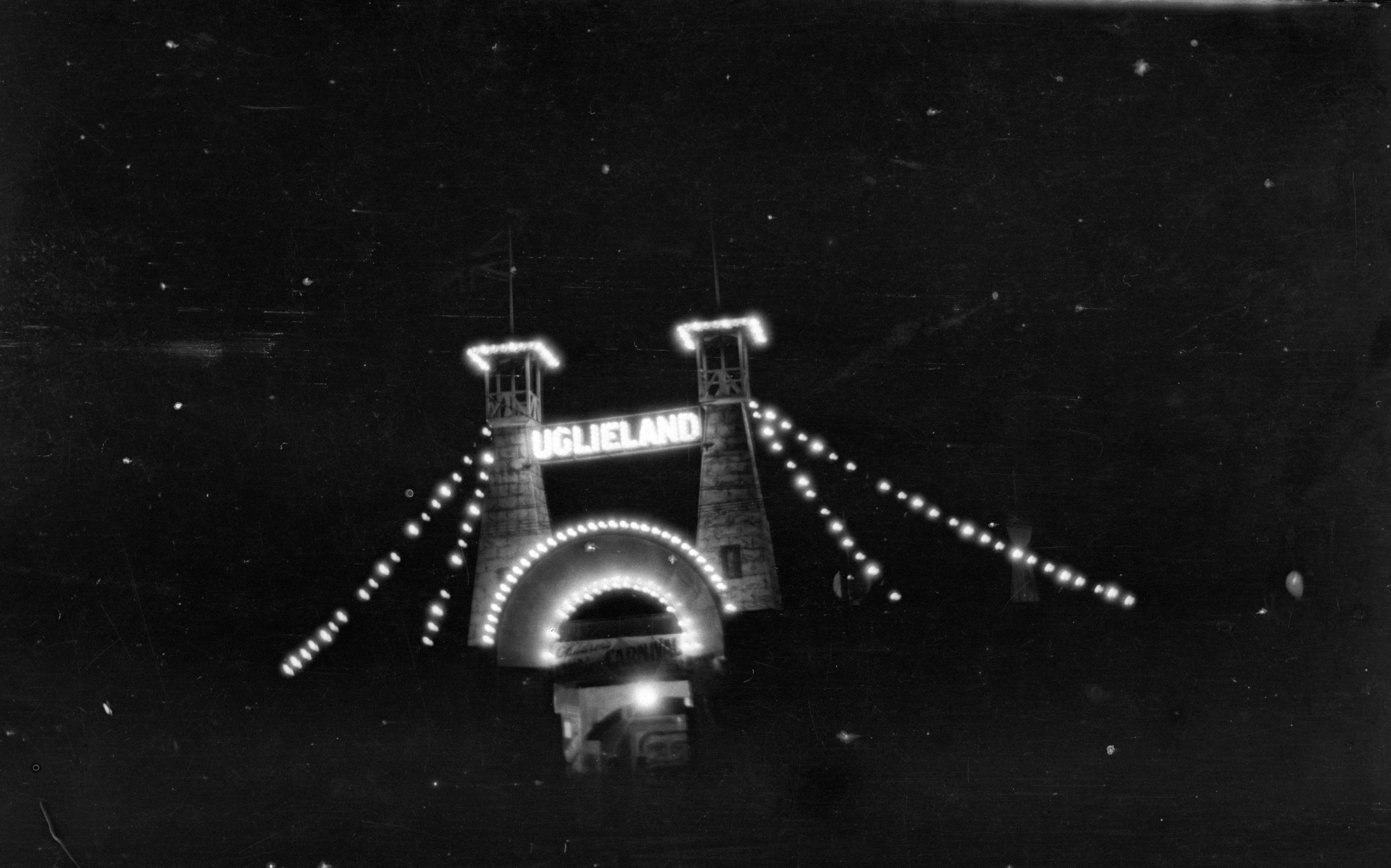
Entrance to Uglieland fairground, Fremantle lit up at night

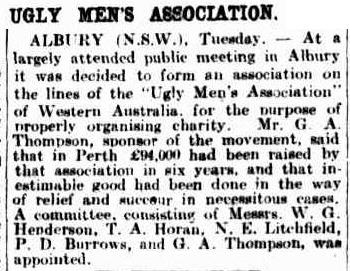
Article from The Argus, 28 November 1923

The Ugly Men's Voluntary Worker's Association of Western Australia Inc., generally shortened to the Ugly Men's Association or Ugly Men was a uniquely Western Australian fund-raising and charitable organisation established in 1917. Previously, a Mrs Alicia Pell had organised an "Uglie Man" competition to raise funds for the Red Cross in Kalgoorlie. The East Perth Football Club then built on the concept to raise funds for the Perth Children's Hospital and the War Patriotic Fund. The football club's work developed into a successful grassroots organisation with the first branch opening in the Perth suburb of Mount Lawley and focusing on supporting cases of hardship caused by war.

The Ugly Men were a major force in the cultural life for both men and women in 1920s Perth, with membership mainly from the lower and middle working-classes. Membership during the 1920s was about 2,000, with 21 branches across the Perth metropolitan area. Members organised dances, social events and busy bees to raise funds and build houses for war-widows and others in need. "Ugly Man" competitions were popular events, with nominations and voting requiring a coin donation.

The popularity of the Ugly Men peaked with the establishment of the annual Uglieland carnivals in Perth city and Fremantle, which raised about £A 12,000 each year. The White City, Perth amusement park was at times known as Uglieland due to the Ugly Men's Association administering the park at various stages in its history. An Uglieland fairground on the corner of Market and Phillimore Streets in Fremantle (now Pioneer reserve opposite Fremantle Railway Station) ran from 1922 to 1936 by the Fremantle Ugly Men's Association to raise funds for underprivileged children.

Uglieland carnivals were highly anticipated annual events. Crowds in the thousands were drawn to the bright lights, live music and open air festivities. A selection of rides (including roller coasters, toboggans and chair-a-planes) and live shows by circus performers and illusionists kept guests entertained well into the evening. But it was Ugly Men's late night gambling and the infamous dance floor that eventually brought the organisation into disrepute.

By the late 1920s, The West Australian had joined a choir of voices from the public and clergy calling for closure of the Uglieland carnivals at White City:

"... there still flourishes in the city a place which, at best is an architectural eyesore and a moral disgrace. Situated at the foot of William-street, and forming one of the few blots on the picturesque riverfront of Perth...

White City, also, contains a large open-air -dance floor on which youths, with their hats on their heads, perform intricate and sometimes immodest, steps with, young women whom, prob- ably they have never seen before...

Since its inception, White City has proved to be a magnet, for larrikins and loafers, who, in various stages of intoxication, make for its gates when the hotels are closed."

Caving to mounting public pressure, the Western Australian government ordered the closure of White City in 1929, effectively bringing an end to the Ugly Men's reign over Perth's social scene. After losing their major fundraising activity, the Ugly Men fell into inactivity during the 1930s. In 1948, the organisation was declared defunct.

Although based in Western Australia, the organisation did spread to other states, particularly in rural centres, and was closely associated with the New Settlers' League and the United British Immigrants' Association, both established to assist new immigrants from the United Kingdom.

The Lotteries Commission of Western Australia was established in 1933 to raise funds for hospitals and community organisations, taking over many of the activities of the Association. Long-serving president and vice-president of the Ugly Men's Association, Alec Clydesdale and Harry Mann, were both appointed to the first Commission board.
