= Noriko Nishimoto =

Japanese–Australian puppeteer

Noriko Nishimoto (西本 則子, Nishimoto Noriko; 25 October 1940 – 16 May 2016) was a Japanese–Australian puppeteer.

Nishimoto began studying drama in Osaka, but turned to puppetry after a friend took her to see a puppet show. She joined Osaka's La Clarte Puppet Theatre, where she spent 16 years working as a performer, writer and director, before going freelance.

In 1980, Australian puppetry director Peter Wilson saw one of her shows in Osaka, and invited her to perform at the Festival of Perth in a puppetry performance of Faust. After a six-week season in Perth, Nishimoto returned to Japan, but was invited back by Wilson in 1981 to join his new company, Spare Parts Puppet Theatre in Fremantle, Western Australia, as a puppet master. Initially on a one-year tenure, Nishimoto stayed for three years and relinquished her Japanese citizenship to take up Australian citizenship.

In 1987, she became assistant artistic director at Spare Parts, and artistic director in 1997. After 19 years with the company, she stepped down to work as a freelance director and puppet artist.

In 2008, she was recognised by the International Puppetry Association UNIMA for her work in Australia, and was presented with an award for outstanding contribution in puppetry in 2012, at the World Congress and Puppet Festival in Chengdu, China.

Nishimoto died of cancer on 16 May 2016, aged 75.
