= Spare Parts Puppet Theatre =

Puppet theatre in Fremantle, Western Australia

- Formation: 1981; 45 years ago
- Founders: Peter Wilson; Cathryn Robinson; Beverley Campbell-Jackson
- Location: Australia
- Website: sppt.com.au
- Building details
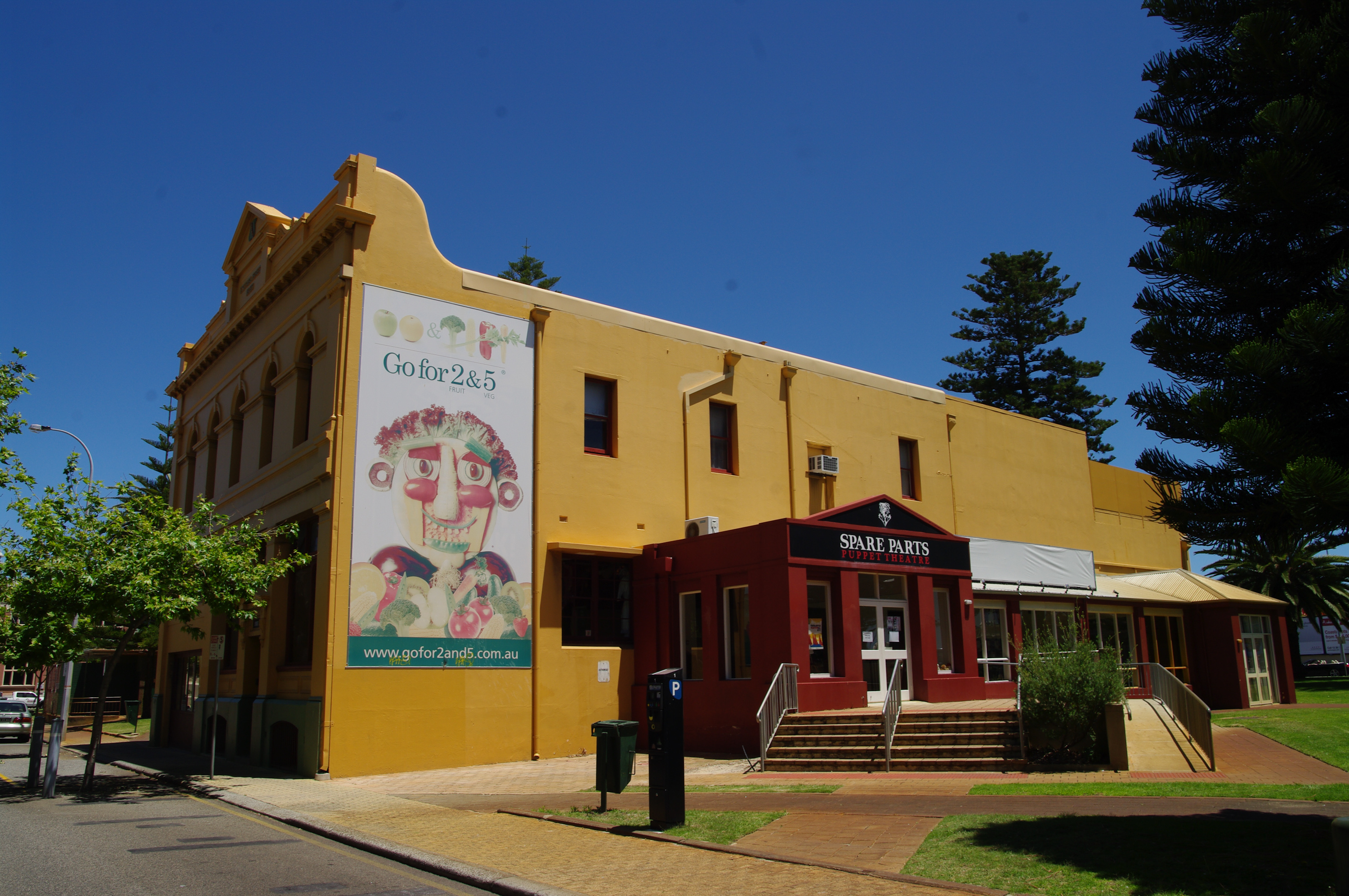
- Former names: State Shipping Service Office; Fremantle Art Gallery

General information
- Location: Australia, 1–9 Short Street
- Coordinates: 32°03′11″S 115°44′43″E
- Current tenants: Spare Parts Puppet Theatre
- Completed: 1921
- Landlord: Department of Culture and the Arts

Western Australia Heritage Register
- Official name: Spare Parts Theatre
- Type: State Registered Place
- Part of: West End, Fremantle (25225)
- Reference no.: 995

The Spare Parts Puppet Theatre is located at 1–9 Short Street, Fremantle, Western Australia, in Pioneer Park, opposite the Fremantle railway station.

== History ==
The building was constructed as a commercial building in 1921. It is a two-storey limestone building with a corrugated iron roof, constructed in the Federation Free Classical style of architecture. The building was used as the State Shipping Service Office. In 1975 it was vested in the City of Fremantle and in September 1978 it was officially opened as the Fremantle Art Gallery. In 1988 it was refurbished to specifically accommodate the Spare Parts Puppet Theatre.

== Heritage value ==
The building is listed on the City of Fremantle's Municipal Heritage List.

== Current use ==
Spare Parts Puppet Theatre was founded by Peter Wilson, Cathryn Robinson and Beverley Campbell-Jackson in 1981, as part of an artist-in-residency program initiated by the Western Australian Institute of Technology (WAIT) – now Curtin University of Technology. The company's first project was a puppet adaptation of Christopher Marlowe's Doctor Faustus for the 1981 Festival of Perth. For the first seven years, the company was a touring company, but in 1988 it acquired the Fremantle Art Gallery as a permanent home. From 1997 through to 2001, the company was under the artistic direction of Noriko Nishimoto. In 2001 Philip Mitchell was appointed the company's new artistic director.

In April 2008 the Spare Parts Puppet Theatre hosted the 20th UNIMA (Union Internationals de la Marlonette) World Puppetry Festival and Congress.

In a 2022 collaboration with The Doge NFT, Spare Parts Puppet Theatre produced Australia's first NFT collection for a theatre company. They also built a Doge puppet, which now has its own TikTok.

The NFT collection was photographed by Louise Coghill.

== Relocation ==
In October 2025 the Spare Parts Puppet Theatre announced a decision to move from their original venue in Fremantle, committing to a redevelopment of the Ellie Eaton Theatre located in the Claremont Showgrounds as their new home. This move, supported by the Western Australian Government, Lotterywest and the Royal Agricultural Society of WA, followed the decision by the State Government to condemn the original theatre over safety and structural concerns for the aging venue.

== Artistic Directors ==
- Peter Wilson (1981–1997)
- Noriko Nishimoto (1997–2001)
- Philip Mitchell (2001–2026)
- Iain Grandage (2027–)

== Awards ==
Type	Organisation	Category	Show/Event	Year
Nomination	Helpmann	Best Presentation for Children	Out of the Blue	2003
Nomination	Helpmann	Best Visual or Physical Theatre Production	H2O - a fantastical voyage	2004
Nomination	Helpmann	Best Lighting Design	Andrew Lake/H2O - a fantastical voyage	2004
Nomination	Helpmann	Best Presentation for Children	H2O - a fantastical voyage	2004
Award	PAAWA	Best Production	The Arrival	2006
Nomination	PAAWA	Best Supporting Actor (Male)	Sanjiva Margio/The Arrival	2006
Nomination	PAAWA	Best Actor (Male)	Giri Mazzella/The Arrival	2006
Nomination	PAAWA	Best Director	Philip Mitchell/The Arrival	2006
Nomination	PAAWA	Best Design in Any Medium	Jiri Zmitko/The Arrival	2006
Nomination	PAAWA	Best Design in Any Medium	Michael Barlow/The Arrival	2006
Nomination	Helpmann	Best Regional Touring Production	The Arrival	2009
Nomination	PAAWA	Best Newcomer	Brian Liau/The Warrior and the Princess	2014
Award	Fremantle Business Awards	Outstanding Cultural Enterprise		2015
Award	Fremantle Business Awards	Business of the Year		2015
Nomination	PAAWA	Best Supporting Actor (Female)	Rebecca Bradley/Farm	2015
Nomination	PAAWA	Best Actor (Female)	Chloe Flockhard/Farm	2015
Nomination	PAAWA	Best Director	Philip Mitchell/Farm	2015
Nomination	PAAWA	Best Production	Farm	2015
Nomination	PAAWA	Best Design in Any Medium	Matt McVeigh/Farm	2015
Nomination	PAAWA	Best Design in Any Medium	Graham Walne/Farm	2015
Award	Fremantle Business Awards	Outstanding Cultural Enterprise		2016
Nomination	PAAWA	Best Actor (Female)	Rebecca Bradley/Blueback	2016
Nomination	PAAWA	Best Music	Lee Buddle/The Little Prince	2017
Nomination	PAAWA	Best Actor in a Mainstage Production (Male)	Sam Longley/Tom Vickers and the Extraordinary Adventure of his Missing Sock	2019
Award	PAAWA	Best Mainstage Production	On Our Beach	2020
Nomination	PAAWA	Best Actor (Female)	Rebecca Bradley/On Our Beach	2020
Nomination	PAAWA	Best Director of a Mainstage Production	Philip Mitchell/On Our Beach	2020
Nomination	PAAWA	Best Stage Design	Cecile Williams/On Our Beach	2020
Nomination	PAAWA	Best Composition or Arranging	Lee Buddle/On Our Beach	2020
Award	PAAWA	Best Mainstage Production	Beanstalk	2022
Award	PAAWA	Best New Work	The One Who Planted Trees	2022
Nomination	PAAWA	Outstanding Performers in Leading Roles	Sam Longley/Beanstalk	2022
Nomination	PAAWA	Outstanding Direction of a Mainstage Production	Philip Mitchell/The One Who Planted Trees	2022
Nomination	PAAWA	Outstanding Composition or Arranging	Melanie Robinson & Carmel Dean/The One Who Planted Trees	2022
Nomination	PAAWA	Outstanding Stage Design	Leon Hendroff & Clare Testoni/The One Who Planted Trees	2022
Nomination	PAAWA	Outstanding Stage Design	Bryan Woltjen/Beanstalk	2022
Nomination	PAAWA	Best Mainstage Production	Wilfred Godon McDonald Partridge	2025
Nomination	PAAWA	Outstanding Performers in Leading Roles	Shane Adamczak/Pillow Fight	2025
