= Box social =

Social event

Box social is a term for a social event that was widely used in the early 1900s with varying definitions in Canada, the United Kingdom and the United States.

== American usage ==
In the U.S. state of Vermont the tradition is that women decorate a cardboard box and fill it with a lunch or dinner for two. The men bid on the women's boxes anticipating a meal with the woman whose box it is. Generally the boxes are anonymous, so the men do not know which woman belongs to which box, nor what the box contains, the mystery and sometimes humorous results adding to the fun. However, it is not unknown for a young woman to surreptitiously drop hints to a favored man indicating which box is hers, as a way of rigging the results. The bidding involves teasing, joking, and competition. The event frequently takes place in a town hall, school gymnasium, or church hall.

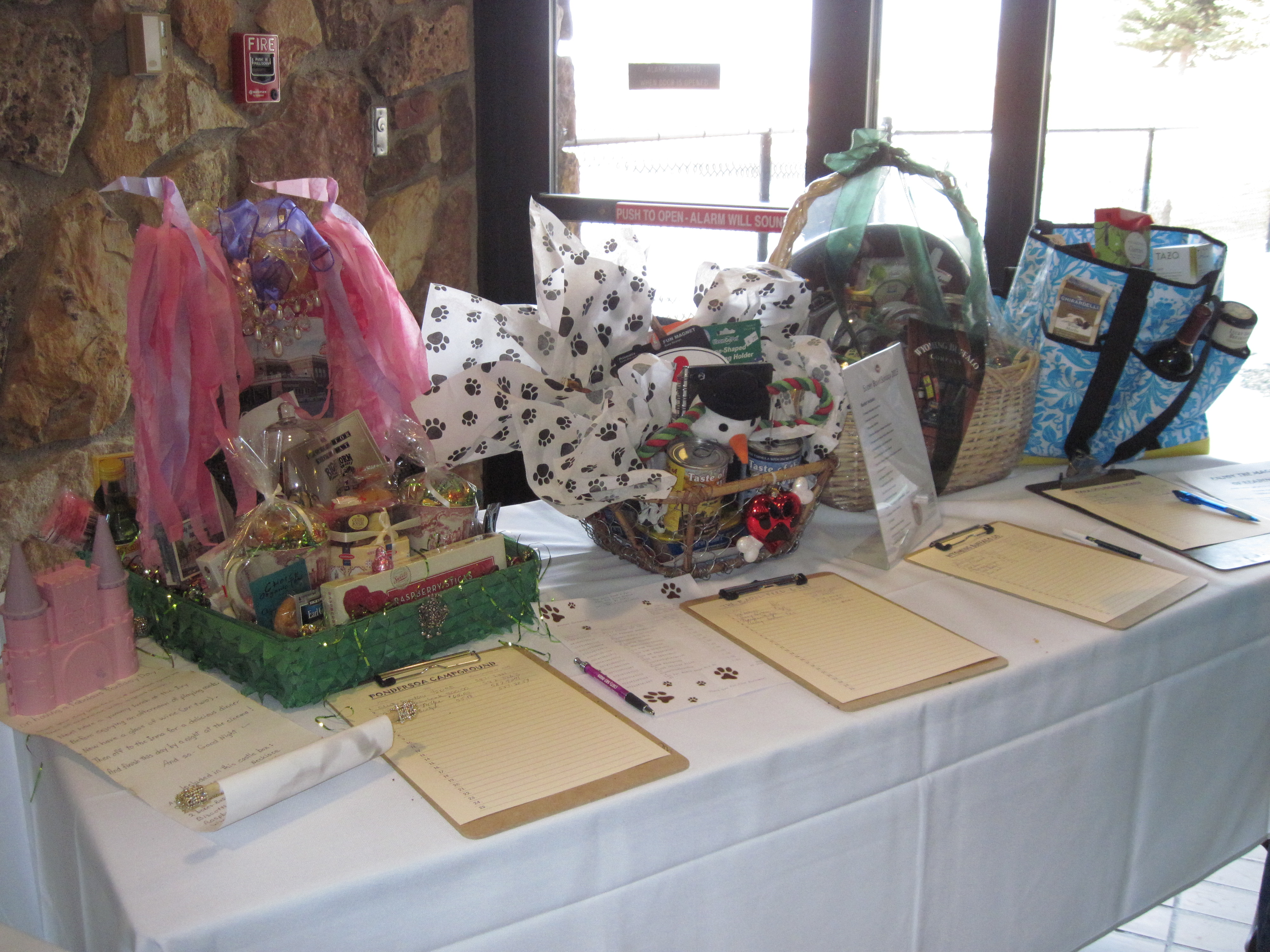
Entries for a box social at a public library

The practice had fallen out of favor with young people in the 1970s–1990s, but has seen some resurgence in recent years. The rules today have become less rigid. Men now provide boxes as well, but the goal remains the same: raising money for a school, church, or civic project.

== In culture ==
A notable example from pop culture is the second act of the musical Oklahoma!, which is set at a box social.

In The Simpsons episode "The Mansion Family" (Season 11, Episode 12), Homer holds a box social.

== See also ==
- Pie supper
