= The Smallest Penis in Brooklyn pageant =

Annual contest in New York

The Smallest Penis in Brooklyn Pageant was an annual contest held at Kings County Saloon (formerly Kings County Bar) in Brooklyn, New York. The pageant is believed to be the first of its kind, in that the event is presented to members of the public and media. (TV and radio personality Howard Stern has produced similar contests, but always within the confines of a studio.) The Brooklyn contest, also known by the acronym SPB, was inaugurated in July 2013 and won by “The Delivery Man”, beating six male contestants, although only five competed for the entire event.

2013 poster

The first pageant played to a packed bar and became an Internet sensation, although mainstream media coverage was limited, possibly due to the graphic nature of the contest. Zachary Rice of Newport WA won the event with a little over 1” penis. Talk-show hosts Jay Leno and Conan O'Brien joked about the pageant in their monologues, and pop star Miley Cyrus lamented in a Tweet to cosmopolitan.com that she had missed the event, and expressed a (possibly facetious) desire to perform and host the next contest. Newspapers, radio stations, and Web sites around the globe featured stories about SPB, often accompanied by not-safe-for-work pictures. In June 2014, Kings County Bar hosted a second Smallest Penis in Brooklyn pageant.

== Origin ==
According to pageant creator Aimee Arciuolo, the idea for a small-penis pageant came to her and some girlfriends after they discussed their bedroom encounters with less-endowed men. Arciuolo told Gothamist and Playboy that she had a sexual encounter with a man who was “actually shockingly tiny, like the size of an acorn. He came right out and said, ‘Yes, I know, I’ve got a little pecker. But don’t worry, we are going to have fun.'" "I was talking to the girls about this one night, and we said, ‘We should have a pageant for these guys!’”

== Contest ==
The pageant, held July 13, 2013, drew a crowd that packed the bar and spilled out into the street. The event was divided into three parts: eveningwear (a tiny penis sock), talent, and swimwear (a sheer, see-through material made more transparent by “penis kittens” wielding squirt guns). As the men stood atop the bar, their penis measurements were taken by judges Arciuolo and burlesque queen “Cherry Pitz” as the crowd looked on and media filmed. Although the actual penis measurements were not announced, members of the press later issued reports: “None of them [the contestants] were a big deal, and that was the cringe-worthy point” – Brooklyn Paper. “All the men lined up on the bar wearing only sheer loin-cloths while the judges measured their privates. Staying in the 1-3 inch range, it was truly a tiny affair” – Cosmopolitan. “All the penises were pretty small” – Jezebel.

== Aftermath ==
Gilronan received $200, a crown and scepter. According to interviews he gave after the contest, he was contacted and offered a role in a porn film, which he declined. He did make an appearance on the syndicated program, The Doctors. In the weeks following the pageant, Gilronan gave numerous print and radio interviews to publications and stations in America and around the globe. "Van Dinkle," in reality a writer from Minnesota, published articles about the pageant for the Australian women's magazine Women's Health & Fitness (December 2013), "The Grouchy Editor," and for maxim.com (October 2013). Gilronan returned to Kings County in 2014 to crown his successor, 28-year-old Rajeev Gupta, visiting the United States from India.

Media coverage ranged from amused to mocking. Jezebel's Callie Beusman summed up her impressions after attending the pageant: "The unabashed display of the small, flaccid phallus ... is fascinating because it's unheard-of. The size of one's penis is an intimate secret; it has the potential to reveal something previously unknown about a man's innermost psyche." Beusman added, "But also, it basically goes without saying that an event like this is compelling because of cheap beer and dicks in little tuxedos."
