= White City, Perth =

Former amusement park on the Perth foreshore

Coordinates: 31.9566°S 115.8549°E

White City, also known as Cooee City or Ugly Land, was an amusement park that existed on the Perth foreshore in Perth, Western Australia between World War I and 1929.

== Location ==
It was originally located where the current Supreme Court Gardens are located, but in 1922 was moved into the space now occupied by the Elizabeth Quay bus and train stations. It was often referred to being located at the foot of William Street.

== Uglieland ==
The name Ugly Land (also seen as Uglieland) was used in the era between the World War I and the Centenary of Western Australia in 1929 due to the Ugly Men's Association being involved with management of various events at the park in its history. It also was considered as a significant entertainment venue for poorer sections of the community. The Ugly Men's Association lost an income generator when White City was closed.

Many different facilities were provided at different stages in the park, including the more unusual events – such as goat racing events.

== Controversy ==
In the 1920s the amusement park caused moral panic due to the allegations of gambling and other activities deemed unsuitable.

There had been calls for it to be closed long before its eventual closure.

It was closed in 1929 after pressure from various groups for it to be removed before the Western Australian centenary celebrations in Perth.

== See also ==
- White City (amusement parks)
