= Orphan's Christmas =

Party held for orphans at Christmas

An orphan's Christmas is a party thrown for orphans, who do not have relations or families capable of throwing their own party. It may be sponsored by the local municipal government or by the local church; due to the police and firefighter's Widows and Orphans Fund, there is also a traditional relationship between these organizations and municipal orphan's Christmas parties. This sort of party is also occasionally called a "widows and orphans party".

The term is also used for a Christmas holiday celebration attended by adults unable to attend more traditional family celebrations, usually due to inability to travel during the Christmas holiday season. One example could be a party hosted by a social club in a major city where not all the club members can visit their families over the holidays. The celebration may take many forms, from a formal dinner at a restaurant to a dance party to a potluck hosted at one participant's house.

The term "orphan" is used not in the more traditional sense of lacking family entirely, but to indicate the fact that the attendees are without family for the holiday season. This type of celebration is most common among groups of people living overseas but is also seen in most major cities, where the large population means that statistically some people will not be native and some non-natives will not be able to travel.

== See also ==
- Holiday season
- Christmas dinner
