= Pie supper =

Social gathering

A pie supper is a social gathering where pies are auctioned to raise money, often for a local school or fire department. Pie suppers provided a major source of funding for many of the region's one-room schools in the late 19th and early 20th centuries.

At a traditional pie supper, women and girls would provide homemade pies to be auctioned, sometimes in boxes decorated with ruffles or bows. Along with the pie itself, the highest bidder won the privilege of sharing the pie with its maker, whose identity was concealed or known only to a handful of people. This prevented the offerings of less-popular or less-known girls from being neglected, earning more donations overall.

Pie suppers had strong courtship elements until the early twentieth century. Before birth control or child support laws, it was economically dangerous and socially unacceptable for an unmarried woman to interact with a young man her community didn't know. In rural America, where people were spread thinly, pie suppers and box socials were an acceptable way for young adults to widen their social circles. It also let a young man judge how well a possible wife could do her primary job—cooking—and gave the young woman some small idea of how well a potential husband could provide.

Pie suppers commonly included a "beauty cake" popularity contest. Several girls would be nominated to receive the cake, and their respective admirers would lobby for votes, which were typically priced at a penny each.

A box supper was a less common variation where the boxes auctioned off contained a chicken dinner, cookies, or a collection of food intended to be a surprise. Ozark box suppers were roughly equivalent to the box socials held in other regions.

== See also ==
- List of dining events
