= Pioneer Park, Fremantle =

Park in Fremantle, Western Australia

Pioneer Park
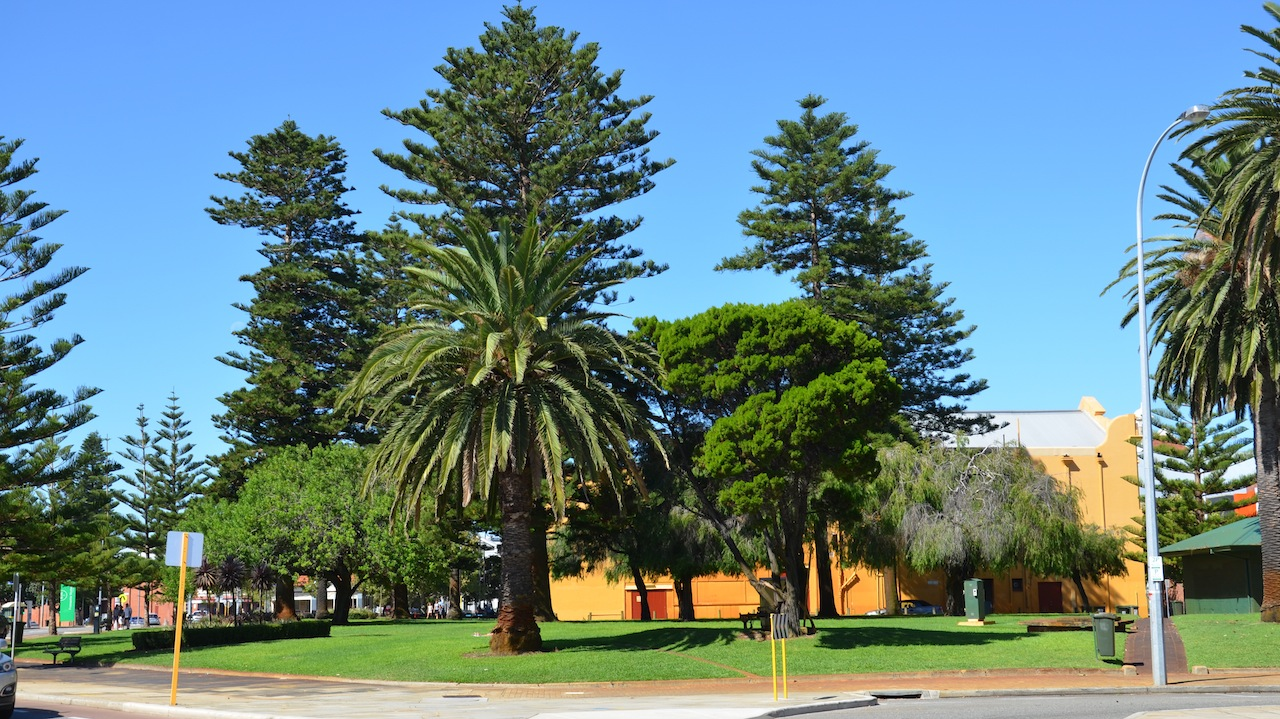
- Pioneer Park from Phillimore Street
- Interactive map of the Pioneer Park area

General information
- Type: Heritage-listed park
- Location: Fremantle, Western Australia
- Coordinates: 32.053076°S 115.74547°E

Western Australia Heritage Register
- Type: State Registered Place
- Part of: West End, Fremantle (25225)
- Reference no.: 22572

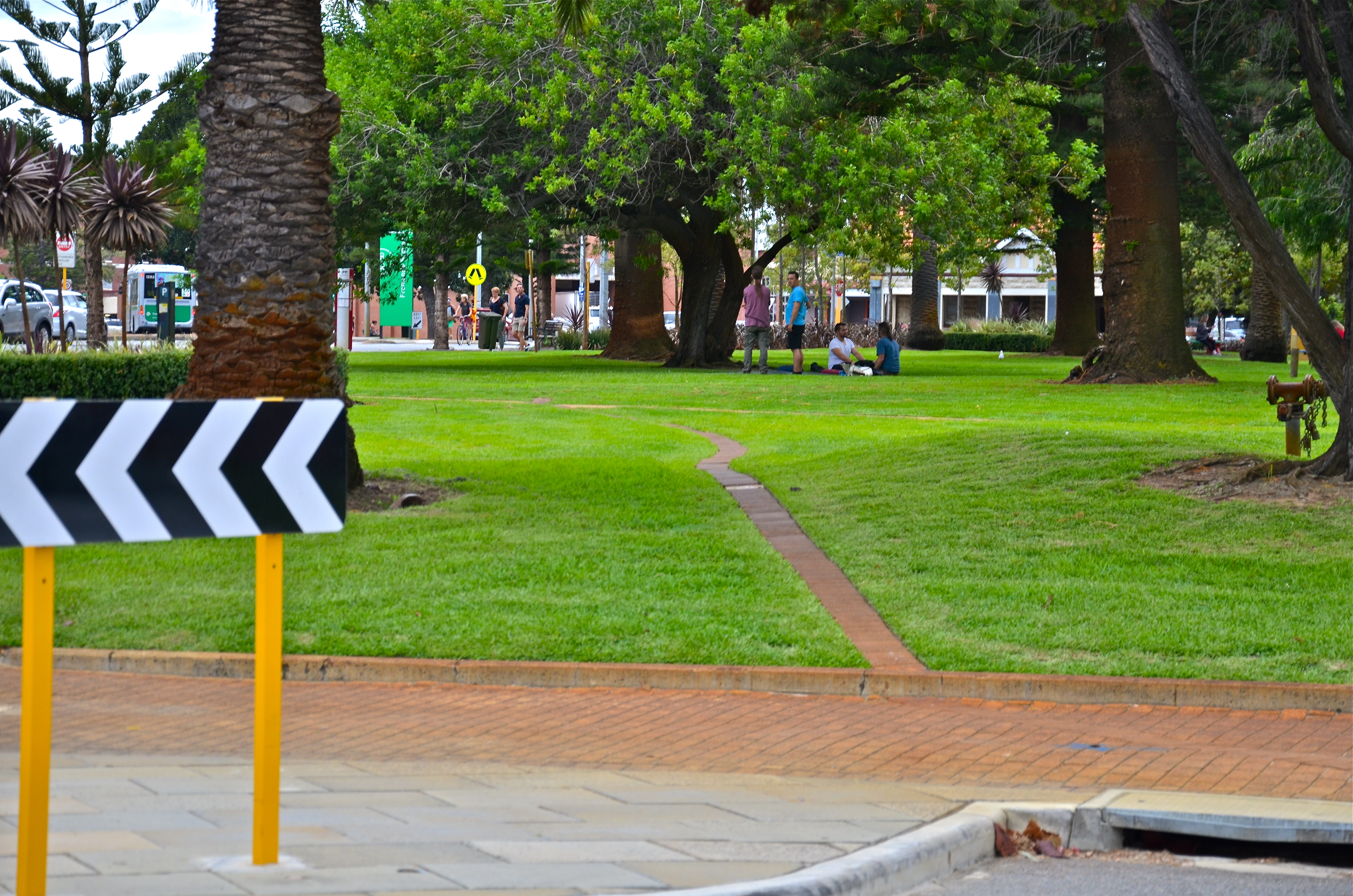
Pioneer Park from west, with original shoreline of Swan River marked by bricks

Pioneer Park or Pioneer Reserve is a public park situated between Pakenham, Short, Phillimore and Market Streets in Fremantle, Western Australia. It is across the road from the Fremantle Railway Station.

The Spare Parts Puppet Theatre is located within the park.

The name was made after the area ceased to be associated with the earlier names of Uglieland Fairground and Uglyland. The fairground had operated between 1922 and 1936 and was opened as the Pioneer Reserve by governor James Mitchell in 1942.

As the park adjoins Short Street on its south side it has also been known as part of the Short Street Precinct and has also been the site of archaeological digs.

In 2021 the park was utilised by homeless people, and their presence created significant reactions from local government and state politicians in the months before the Western Australian 2021 state election.
