= Stewart, Texas =

Stewart
- Unincorporated community
- Stewart's position in Texas.
- Coordinates: 32°17′52″N 94°38′53″W
- Country: United States
- State: Texas
- County: Rusk
- Elevation: 453 ft (138 m)

Population (2000)
  - Total: 15
- Time zone: UTC-6 (Central (CST))
  - Summer (DST): UTC-5 (CDT)
- Area codes: 903, 430
- GNIS feature ID: 1380608

Stewart is an unincorporated community in Rusk County, Texas, United States. According to the Handbook of Texas, the community had a population of 15 in 2000. It is located within the Longview, Texas metropolitan area.

== History ==
A post office was established at Stewart in 1896 and remained in operation until 1907, with William C. Ray as postmaster. Mail delivery was then sent from Elderville. Its population was 15 in 2000.

== Geography ==
Stewart is located at the intersection of Farm to Market Roads 782 and 2127, 5 mi (8.0 km) west of Harmony Hill, 12 mi (19 km) northeast of Henderson, 12 mi (19 km) south of Longview, 14 mi (23 km) southeast of Kilgore, and 8 mi (13 km) west of Tatum in northeastern Rusk County.

== Education ==
The Tatum Independent School District serves area students.
