= Brachfield, Texas =

Unincorporated community in Rusk County, Texas, United States

Brachfield
- Unincorporated community
- Location in Texas, United States Brachfield (the United States)
- Coordinates: 32°02′44″N 94°38′54″W
- Country: United States
- State: Texas
- County: Rusk
- Elevation: 400 ft (120 m)

Population (2000)
  - Total: 40
- GNIS feature ID: 1378042

Brachfield (formerly Murval and Needmore) is an unincorporated community in Rusk County, Texas, United States. According to the Handbook of Texas, the community had a population of 40 in 2000. It is located within the Longview, Texas metropolitan area.

== History ==
The town was named after its creek, Murval Creek in the 1860s, it was nearby Gibson, which was also named after Murval Creek, and they both shared a post office in 1853, with Archibald H. Watkins as postmaster. Families surnamed Watkins, Miller, Brown, Welch, Hannah, and Debard were early settlers here. Trammel's Trace traveled through the community and may have been the source of settlement for the community. It was referred to as Needmore by its local county newspaper from 1892 to 1905 (because it seemingly "needed more" of everything), but to prevent confusion with the Needmore located in Terry County, it was renamed again after the residents had stuck with the name. A passing hotel and store were built for people coming from the booming Welch Springs by Nathaniel Johnston, who took over as postmaster in 1896. The town is currently named Brachfield because in 1900 Charles L. Brachfield visited the town and stood in one of its fields to make a speech, a new post office was also named after him but closed in 1906. The locals call speeches like this 'stump speeches' because of the cleared field Brachfield spoke in. Population figures before the 1950s aren't available, but in the 1950s and '60s, the community population peaked at 80, but fell in the '70s and '80s and had 30 people in 1990, then rose again by 10 in the '90s to be 40 in 2000.

== Geography ==
Brachfield is located at the intersection of Farm to Market Roads 840 and 1798, 13 mi (21 km) southeast of Henderson, 9 mi (14 km) north of Mount Enterprise, 5 mi (8.0 km) southwest of Pine Hill, 19 mi (31 km) southwest of Carthage, and 31 mi (50 km) north of Nacogdoches in far eastern Rusk County.

== Education ==
Today, the community is served by the Henderson Independent School District.

== See also ==
- List of unincorporated communities in Texas
