= Bryce, Texas =

Unincorporated community in Rusk County, Texas, United States

- Unincorporated community
- Location within Texas Location within the United States
- Coordinates: 31°58′06″N 94°32′26″W
- Country: United States
- State: Texas
- County: Rusk
- Elevation: 446 ft (136 m)
- Time zone: UTC-6 (Central (CST))
  - Summer (DST): UTC-5 (CDT)
- Area codes: 430 & 903
- GNIS feature ID: 2034730

Bryce is an unincorporated community in Rusk County, Texas, United States. According to the Handbook of Texas, the community had a population of 15 in 2000. It is located within the Longview, Texas metropolitan area.

== History ==
Originally settled as logging community called Eulalie in the 1880s, the settlement had been renamed to Bryce by 1984. The community had a post office from 1993 to 1907.

Historical population
Year	Pop.	±%
1896	150	—
1910	75	−50.0%
1930	40	−46.7%
2000	15	−62.5%

== Geography ==
Bryce is located 3 mi (4.8 km) north of Caledonia and 9 mi (14 km) east of Mount Enterprise in southeastern Rusk County.

== Education ==
Bryce may have had a school in 1896. Today, the community is served by the Henderson Independent School District.

== See also ==
- List of unincorporated communities in Texas
