= Minden, Texas =

Minden
- Unincorporated community
- Location within the state of Texas Minden (the United States)
- Coordinates: 32°0′49″N 94°42′27″W
- Country: United States
- State: Texas
- County: Rusk
- Elevation: 469 ft (143 m)
- Time zone: UTC-6 (Central (CST))
  - Summer (DST): UTC-5 (CDT)
- ZIP code: 75680
- Area codes: 903, 430
- GNIS feature ID: 1341704

Minden is an unincorporated community in Rusk County, Texas, United States. According to the Handbook of Texas, the community had a population of 350 in 2000. It is located within the Longview, Texas metropolitan area.

== History ==
The original location of Minden was a mile east of where it currently stands today. The Lewis family relocated here from Georgia in 1849. H.W. Watson named the community for his hometown of Minden, Louisiana. A post office opened here in 1850 with William H. Pate serving as the first postmaster. In the next decade, the Marshall-to-Nacogdoches railroad built a track through Minden and had a store and a church. It then moved to its present site in the 1880s, in which it had 50 residents, a cotton gin, and three churches in 1884. The population went up to 155 with sawmills, gristmills, and a newspaper. It doubled during that decade but went down to 223 by the turn of the century. It went up to 250 in the mid-1940s, declined to 125 from the 1950s to 1960s, and went back up to 350 from the late 1960s through 2000.

== Geography ==
Minden is located on Farm to Market Road 1798, 12 mi (19 km) southeast of Henderson in southeastern Rusk County. It is also located 7 mi (11 km) north of Mount Enterprise and 22 mi (35 km) southwest of Carthage.

=== Climate ===
The climate in this area is characterized by hot, humid summers and generally mild to cool winters. According to the Köppen Climate Classification system, Minden has a humid subtropical climate, abbreviated "Cfa" on climate maps.

== Education ==
Minden had its own school in 1860. Rock Hill Institute was opened by G.I. Watkins in 1880 and was chartered in 1888. Today, the community is served by the Henderson Independent School District.

== Notable person ==
- Oren Arnold, journalist and novelist, was born in Minden.
