= Chapman, Texas =

- Unincorporated community
- Location within Texas Location within the United States
- Coordinates: 32°09′00″N 94°38′00″W
- Country: United States
- State: Texas
- County: Rusk
- Elevation: 413 ft (126 m)
- Time zone: UTC-6 (Central (CST))
  - Summer (DST): UTC-5 (CDT)
- Area codes: 430 & 903
- GNIS feature ID: 1378114

Chapman is an unincorporated community in Rusk County, located in the U.S. state of Texas. According to the Handbook of Texas, the community had a population of 20 in 2000. It is located within the Longview, Texas metropolitan area.

== Geography ==
Chapman is located on Texas State Highway 79 near Trammel's Trace, 8 mi (13 km) east of Henderson, 19 mi (31 km) west of Carthage, and 26 mi (42 km) southeast of Kilgore in eastern Rusk County.

== Education ==
Today, the community is served by the Henderson Independent School District.
