= Harmony Hill =

Harmony Hill may refer to:

- Harmony Hill, Texas, an unincorporated area in Rusk County, Texas.
- Harmony Hill, Wisconsin, an unincorporated community in the town of Scott, Wisconsin.
- Harmony Hill United Methodist Church, a church in Stillwater Township, New Jersey.
- Harmony Hill, the first album from the band, Dervish.
- Harmony Hill Bridge, an alternate name for Gibson's Covered Bridge, in East Bradford, Pennsylvania.
- Harmony Hill Baptist Church, a Baptist church located in Lufkin, Texas
