= Oak Hill, Rusk County, Texas =

- Unincorporated community
- Location within Texas Location within the United States
- Coordinates: 32°16′27″N 94°41′42″W
- Country: United States
- State: Texas
- County: Rusk
- Elevation: 459 ft (140 m)
- Time zone: UTC-6 (Central (CST))
  - Summer (DST): UTC-5 (CDT)
- Area codes: 430 & 903
- GNIS feature ID: 1380273

Oak Hill is an unincorporated community in Rusk County, located in the U.S. state of Texas. According to the Handbook of Texas, the community had a population of 24 in 2000. It is located within the Longview, Texas metropolitan area.

== Demographics ==
Oak Hill's population ranged from 10 in the 1930s to 80 in the 1940s and then 100 in the 1950s to 1960s, then dropped to 24 from the early 1970s through 2000.

== Geography ==
Oak Hill is located at the intersection of Farm to Market Roads 782 and 1716, 10 mi (16 km) northeast of Henderson in northeastern Rusk County.

== Education ==
Today, the community is served by the Henderson Independent School District.
