= Concord, Rusk County, Texas =

Unincorporated community in Rusk County, Texas, United States

- Unincorporated community
- Location within the state of Texas Concord (the United States)
- Coordinates: 31°55′00″N 94°35′19″W
- Country: United States
- State: Texas
- County: Rusk County
- Elevation: 522 ft (159 m)

Population (2000)
  - Total: 23
- GNIS feature ID: 1379584

Concord is an unincorporated community in Rusk County, Texas, United States. According to the Handbook of Texas, the community had a population of 23 in 2000. It is located within the Longview, Texas metropolitan area.

== History ==
Concord is one of the oldest communities in Rusk County; it was named after the general harmony that early settlers had. There was a population of 25 residents in the 1930s and at that time there were six businesses in the community. The population was at its peak in the 1940s, with 125 residents and four businesses. However, postwar relocation decreased the population to 23 residents when the 1980 United States census was taken. The population remained the same when the 2000 United States census was taken.

On February 18, 2013, an EF0 tornado struck Concord. Several trees were snapped and an above-ground swimming pool was wrapped around a tree.

== Geography ==
Concord is located at the intersection of Farm to Market Roads 95 and 3198 and approximately one-half mile south of U.S. Route 84, 24 mi (39 km) southeast of Henderson, 5.5 mi (8.9 km) east of Mount Enterprise, 8 mi (13 km) west of Timpson, and 7 mi (11 km) north of Garrison in southeastern Rusk County.

== Education ==
In the late 1800s, Concord School was established, it was closed in 1966 and dismantled in 1977, and there is now a memorial plaque at its location. Today, the community is served by the Henderson Independent School District.

== See also ==
- List of unincorporated communities in Texas
