= Dirgin, Texas =

- Unincorporated community
- Location within Texas Location within the United States
- Coordinates: 32°15′26″N 94°35′20″W
- Country: United States
- State: Texas
- County: Rusk
- Elevation: 374 ft (114 m)
- Time zone: UTC-6 (Central (CST))
  - Summer (DST): UTC-5 (CDT)
- Postal code: 75691
- Area codes: 430, 903
- GNIS feature ID: 1379667

Dirgin is an unincorporated community in Rusk County, located in the U.S. state of Texas. According to the Handbook of Texas, the community had a population of 12 in 2000. It is located within the Longview, Texas metropolitan area.

== History ==
A post office was established at Dirgin in 1898 and remained in operation until 1918. It had two general stores, a sawmill, and 100 residents in 1914. It lost three-quarters of its population in 1933 and had only one business. By 1940, it still had only one business, a church, and several scattered houses. The population went up to 50 during that decade, but then dropped to 12 in the 1960s through 2000.

== Geography ==
Dirgin is located on Farm to Market Road 2658, 14 mi (23 km) northeast of Henderson in northeastern Rusk County.

== Education ==
In 1907, Dirgin had two schools. One had 33 White students and one teacher, and the other had 92 Black students and one teacher. Today, the community is served by the Tatum Independent School District.
