= Church Hill, Texas =

- Unincorporated community
- Location within Texas Location within the United States
- Coordinates: 32°11′28″N 94°39′55″W
- Country: United States
- State: Texas
- County: Rusk
- Elevation: 417 ft (127 m)
- Time zone: UTC-6 (Central (CST))
  - Summer (DST): UTC-5 (CDT)
- Postal code: 75652
- Area codes: 430, 903
- GNIS feature ID: 2034757

Church Hill is an unincorporated community in Rusk County, located in the U.S. state of Texas. According to the Handbook of Texas, the community had a population of 20 in 2000. It is located within the Longview, Texas metropolitan area.

== History ==
The area in what is known as Church Hill today was first settled in the early 1850s by people from Georgia. It was named for a hill covered in trees where they built a church. Plantations were soon built. A man named Dr. Prior built the first brick house in the community after moving to the area from Virginia. A post office was established at Church Hill in 1893 and remained in operation until 1904 with George S. Strong as postmaster. Mail was then sent from Henderson. The community had a population of 30 in 1895 alongside a Methodist church and a general store. Its population was still 30 from 1936 to 1966, lost half of it from 1967 to 1990, and went up to 20 in 2000. Strong cemetery is located nearby.

== Geography ==
Church Hill is located at the intersection of Farm to Market Roads 1251 and 3135, 9 mi (14 km) northeast of Henderson in eastern Rusk County.

== Education ==
Church Hill had a school called Church Hill Male and Female Academy in the 1850s and was supported by a Presbyterian church. John C. Robertson, Samuel Watson, and Strong donated land for the school. Jackson Pryor, Anderson W. Smith, Newell Tullis, and William P. Wright served as trustees on the school board. The principal was John M. Becton. It closed sometime after the American Civil War. Today, the community is served by the Henderson Independent School District.
