= Pitner Junction, Texas =

- Unincorporated community
- Location within Texas Location within the United States
- Coordinates: 32°17′23″N 94°52′07″W
- Country: United States
- State: Texas
- County: Rusk
- Elevation: 367 ft (112 m)
- Time zone: UTC-6 (Central (CST))
  - Summer (DST): UTC-5 (CDT)
- Area codes: 430, 903
- GNIS feature ID: 1378874

Pitner Junction is an unincorporated community in Rusk County, located in the U.S. state of Texas. According to the Handbook of Texas, the community had a population of 20 in 2000. It is located within the Longview, Texas metropolitan area.

== History ==
Pitner Junction was named for its location and for a local family with that last name. It may have been settled before 1900. County highway maps in the 1930s showed a business and several scattered houses. It also had a general store for some time. Its population was reported as 20 in 2000.

== Geography ==
Pitner Junction is located at the intersection of U.S. Route 259 and Farm to Market Road 918, 10 mi (16 km) northwest of Henderson in northwestern Rusk County.

== Education ==
Today, the community is served by the Kilgore Independent School District.
