= Caledonia, Texas =

Unincorporated community in Rusk County, Texas, United States

- Unincorporated community
- Location within Texas Location within the United States
- Coordinates: 31°55′27″N 94°31′37″W
- Country: United States
- State: Texas
- County: Rusk
- Elevation: 390 ft (120 m)
- Time zone: UTC-6 (Central (CST))
  - Summer (DST): UTC-5 (CDT)
- Area codes: 430 & 903
- GNIS feature ID: 1379492

Caledonia is an unincorporated community in Rusk County, Texas, United States. According to the Handbook of Texas, the community had a population of 75 in 2000. It is located within the Longview, Texas metropolitan area.

== Geography ==
Caledonia is located at the intersection of U.S. Route 84 and Farm to Market Road 1971, 28 mi (45 km) southeast of Henderson, 9 mi (14 km) east of Mount Enterprise, 19 mi (31 km) southwest of Carthage, and 31 mi (50 km) northeast of Nacogdoches in extreme southeastern Rusk County.

== Education ==
Caledonia had its own school in 1883. Today, the community is served by the Henderson Independent School District.

== See also ==
- List of unincorporated communities in Texas
