= Leverett =

Leverett may refer to:

== Places ==
=== United States ===
- Leverett, Illinois, an unincorporated community
- Leverett, Massachusetts, a town
- Leverett, Mississippi, an unincorporated community
- Leverett's Chapel, Texas, an unincorporated community
  - Leverett's Chapel Independent School District, Texas

=== Antarctica ===
- Leverett Glacier

== People ==
=== Given name ===
- Leverett W. Babcock (1840–1906), American politician
- Leverett Baldwin (1839–1897), American politician
- Leverett George DeVeber (1849–1925), Canadian politician
- Leverett Hubbard (1723–1793), justice of the New Hampshire Supreme Court
- Leverett S. Lyon (1885–1959), American economist
- Leverett Saltonstall I (1783–1845), American politician
- Leverett Saltonstall (1892–1879), American politician

=== Surname ===
- Frank Leverett (1859–1943), American geologist
- John Leverett (1616–1679), governor of Massachusetts Bay Colony (1673–1679)
- John Leverett (1662–1724), seventh president of Harvard College (1708–1724)
- Nick Leverett (born 1997), American football player

== Other uses ==
- Leverett Circle Connector Bridge, Massachusetts, United States
- Leverett House, one of the twelve residential houses of Harvard University, United States
- Leverett Street Jail, Massachusetts, United States
- Leverett J-function
- Buckley–Leverett equation
