= Chalk Hill, Texas =

- Unincorporated community
- Location within Texas Location within the United States
- Coordinates: 32°21′11″N 94°39′04″W
- Country: United States
- State: Texas
- County: Rusk
- Elevation: 394 ft (120 m)
- Time zone: UTC-6 (Central (CST))
  - Summer (DST): UTC-5 (CDT)
- Area codes: 430, 903
- GNIS feature ID: 1379527

Chalk Hill is an unincorporated community in Rusk County, located in the U.S. state of Texas. According to the Handbook of Texas, the community had a population of 200 in 2000. It is located within the Longview, Texas metropolitan area.

== History ==
The area in what is known as Chalk Hill today was first settled around 1875. Its population was 200 in 2000.

== Geography ==
Chalk Hill is located at the intersection of Farm to Market Roads 1716, 2164 and 2166, 15 mi (24 km) northeast of Henderson, 8 mi (13 km) south of Longview, and 6 mi (9.7 km) northwest of Tatum in northeastern Rusk County.

== Education ==
Today, the community is served by the Tatum Independent School District.

== Media ==
- KEBE
- KDOK
