= East Texas Multi-Use Facility =

Private prison in Henderson, Texas

Coordinates: 32°10′30″N 94°48′06″W

- Interactive map of East Texas Multi-Use Facility
- Location: 900 Industrial Drive Henderson, Texas
- Status: open
- Security class: mixed
- Capacity: 2236
- Opened: March 2004
- Managed by: Management and Training Corporation

The East Texas Multi-Use Facility aka the East Texas Treatment (XQ) facility is a private prison located in Henderson, Rusk County, Texas, owned and operated by the Management and Training Corporation under contract with the Texas Department of Criminal Justice.

The facility provides treatment services to offenders in In-Prison DWI Recovery programs, Substance Abuse Felony Punishment programs, and Intermediate Sanction Treatment programs. As of 2011 it was the largest licensed treatment facility in the state, and "possibly the country," according to MTC's Regional Warden for the State of Texas, Kerry Dixon.

Opened in March 2004, this facility houses:

- a maximum of 500 males in DWI Offender programs
- a maximum of 336 males in Substance Abuse programs
- a maximum of 1400 (1176 male and 224 female) in ISF (Intermediate Sanction Facility)

MTC owns three secure facilities in Rusk County for state prisoners: the East Texas Treatment; the Bradshaw State Jail, placed in idle status as of August 2020 because of declining populations; and the Billy Moore Correctional Center.
