= Good Springs, Texas =

- Unincorporated community
- Location within Texas Location within the United States
- Coordinates: 32°03′23″N 94°54′39″W
- Country: United States
- State: Texas
- County: Rusk
- Elevation: 430 ft (130 m)
- Time zone: UTC-6 (Central (CST))
  - Summer (DST): UTC-5 (CDT)
- Postal code: 75652
- Area codes: 430, 903
- GNIS feature ID: 1378367

Good Springs is an unincorporated community in Rusk County, located in the U.S. state of Texas. According to the Handbook of Texas, the community had a population of 40 in 2000. It is located within the Longview, Texas metropolitan area.

== History ==
Good Springs was named for a Cherokee village in the area. The Cherokee were driven out of the area in 1839. It was also known as Lick Skillet for a time. Its population ranged from 25 in the 1940s, 21 in 1990, and 40 in 2000.

== Geography ==
Good Springs is located on U.S. Highway 79, 10 mi (16 km) southwest of Henderson in southwestern Rusk County.

== Education ==
Today, the community is served by the Carlisle Independent School District.
