= Pine Hill, Texas =

Unincorporated community in Rusk County, Texas, United States

- Unincorporated community
- Location within Texas Location within the United States
- Coordinates: 32°06′17″N 94°36′19″W
- Country: United States
- State: Texas
- County: Rusk
- Elevation: 387 ft (118 m)
- Time zone: UTC-6 (Central (CST))
  - Summer (DST): UTC-5 (CDT)
- Area codes: 430, 903
- GNIS feature ID: 1378869

Pine Hill or Pinehill is an unincorporated community in Rusk County, Texas, United States. According to the Handbook of Texas, the community had a population of 49 in 2000. It is located within the Longview, Texas metropolitan area.

== Geography ==
Pine Hill is located at the intersection of Farm to Market Roads 348 and 1798, approximately three miles south of U.S. Highway 79, 11 mi (18 km) east of Henderson and 15 mi (24 km) west of Carthage in far-eastern Rusk County.

== Education ==
Today, the community is served by the Henderson Independent School District.

== See also ==
- List of unincorporated communities in Texas
