= New Salem, Texas =

New Salem
- Unincorporated area
- Location within the state of Texas New Salem (the United States)
- Coordinates: 31°56′30″N 94°57′35″W
- Country: United States
- State: Texas
- County: Rusk County
- Elevation: 459 ft (140 m)

Population (2000)
  - Total: 55
- Time zone: UTC-6 (Central (CST))
  - Summer (DST): UTC-5 (CDT)
- GNIS feature ID: 1378751

New Salem is an unincorporated community located in Rusk County, Texas, United States. According to the Handbook of Texas, the community had a population of 55 in 2000. It is located within the Longview, Texas metropolitan area.

== History ==
Before the American Civil War, New Salem was settled by planters. The town was named "Salem" by Oscar Wilson, in honor of his former home in Victoria County, Texas. A malaria outbreak diminished the community's population. However, the population began to expand in the 1850s with the town being officially incorporated in 1856. A post office was established in 1849; the postmaster was Poindexter Payne. The town's population was 100 in 1855 and decreased to 85 by 1896. The town had three stores, two flour mills, and a Baptist church. The post office was shut down in 1955 and mail was redirected to Henderson, Texas. The population remained stable at 180 from the 1920s through the 1960s, but by 1970 the population had decreased to 31. In the 2000 United States census the population was 55. John H. Pruitt was also a major settler in New Salem.

== Geography ==
New Salem is located 10 mi (16 km) southwest of Laneville in southwestern Rusk County.

== Education ==
New Salem Academy opened in 1854. Today, the community is served by the Laneville Independent School District.
