= Kilgore College =

Community college in Kilgore, Texas, U.S.

- Motto: “Your Future Starts Here!”, and “Blue Steel”
- Type: Public community college
- Established: 1935
- Endowment: $24 million
- President: Staci Martin
- Students: 5000+ credit hour; 3700+ non-credit
- Location: Kilgore, Texas, U.S. 32.377056°N 94.872600°W
- Colors: Blue and White
- Nickname: Rangers
- Sporting affiliations: Southwest Junior College Football Conference (SWJCFC) and Southwest Junior College Conference (SWJCC)
- Mascot: Rangers
- Website: www.kilgore.edu

Kilgore College (KC) is a public community college in Kilgore, Texas. It has an annual enrollment in excess of 5,000 students, and is accredited by the Southern Association of Colleges and Schools Commission on Colleges to award the associate degree.

The college was established in 1935 at the height of the East Texas oil boom, and as such, is home to the East Texas Oil Museum which houses a large collection of memorabilia documenting this period of Texas history. It is also famous for having the first ever dance-drill team, the Kilgore College Rangerettes, which began in 1940 under the direction of Gussie Nell Davis.

== History ==
The East Texas oil boom that started near Kilgore in late 1930 generated large amounts of revenue that made it possible to establish a community college. W.L. Dodson, superintendent of the local Kilgore school district, brought B. E. Masters, then president of Amarillo Junior College, to Kilgore in the spring of 1935 to assist in creating the college. The college was established in August of that year, with Dodson named as the first president, and Masters as the first dean. College classes began that fall with 11 faculty members and 229 students temporarily using the Kilgore public school facilities.

== Academics ==
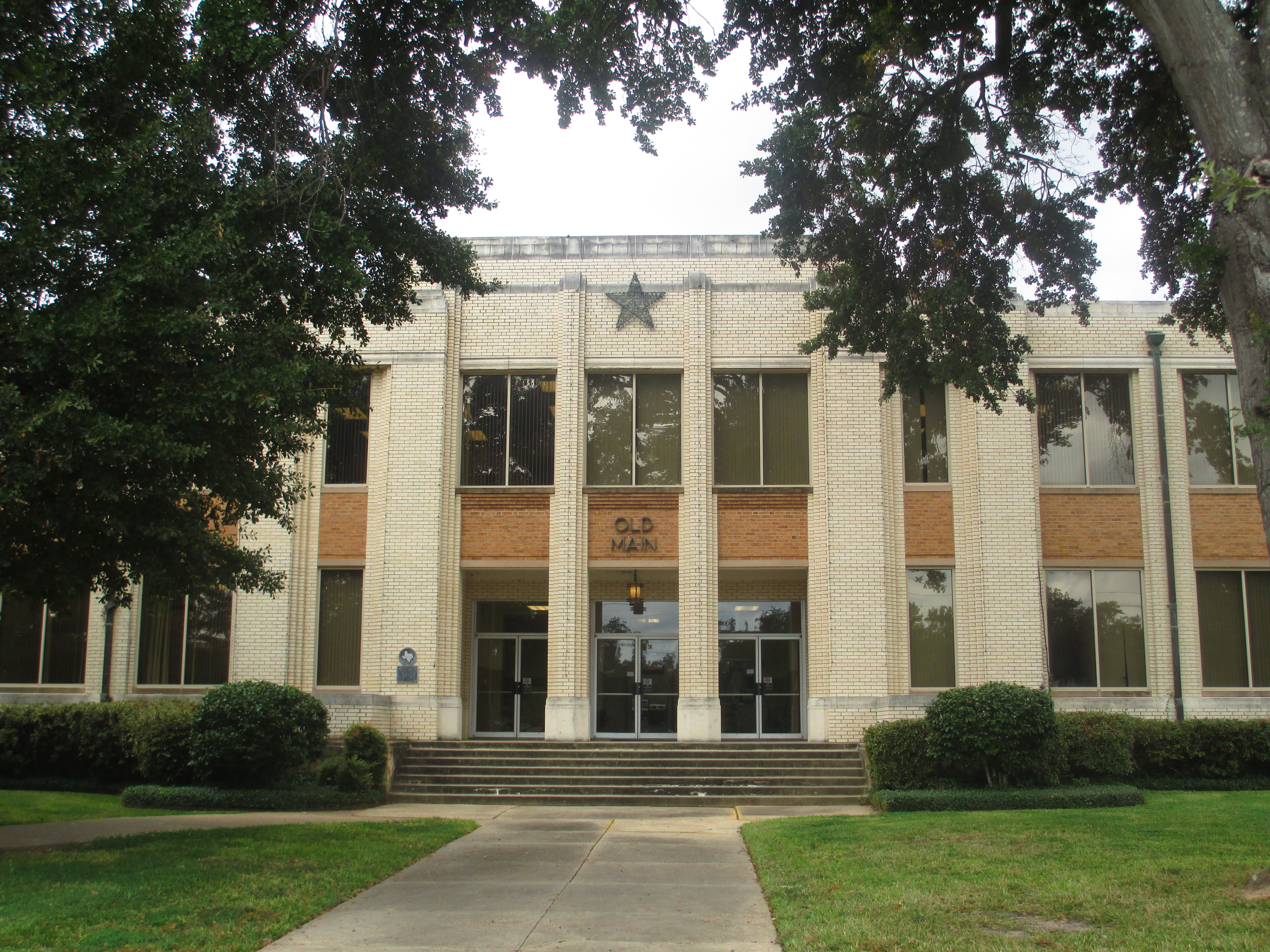
Old Main at Kilgore College

In addition to preparing students for undergraduate degrees that are completed at 4-year colleges and universities, KC's programs also include continuing education, medical training, and short-term and long-term workforce training. The college offers Associate in Arts and Associate in Applied Science degrees, as well as tech prep and certificate programs.

== Athletics ==
KC fields teams in four sports:

- Men's Basketball - NJCAA national champions 1956, 1958
- Women's Basketball - NJCAA national champions 1988, 1990, 1993
- Football - NJCAA national champions 1966
- Softball

The Rangers compete in the National Junior College Athletic Association's Region XIV, as a member of the Southwest Junior College Football Conference for football, and the Southwest Junior College Conference for all other sports.

== Texas Shakespeare Festival ==
In June 1986, the Texas Shakespeare Festival opened its inaugural season at Kilgore College. It will celebrate its 41st year in the summer of 2026. The college provides financial support and facilities for the festival, which is a vital cultural asset for all of East Texas.

== College service area ==
As defined by the Texas Legislature, the official service area of KC includes territory within the following school districts:

- Big Sandy Independent School District
- Carlisle Independent School District
- Gilmer Independent School District
- Gladewater Independent School District
- Hallsville Independent School District
- Henderson Independent School District
- Kilgore Independent School District
- Laneville Independent School District
- Leverett's Chapel Independent School District
- Longview Independent School District
- Mount Enterprise Independent School District
- New Diana Independent School District
- Overton Independent School District
- Pine Tree Independent School District
- Sabine Independent School District
- Spring Hill Independent School District
- Tatum Independent School District (except the part of the district that is located in Panola County)
- Union Grove Independent School District
- West Rusk Independent School District
- White Oak Independent School District

== Kilgore College gallery ==
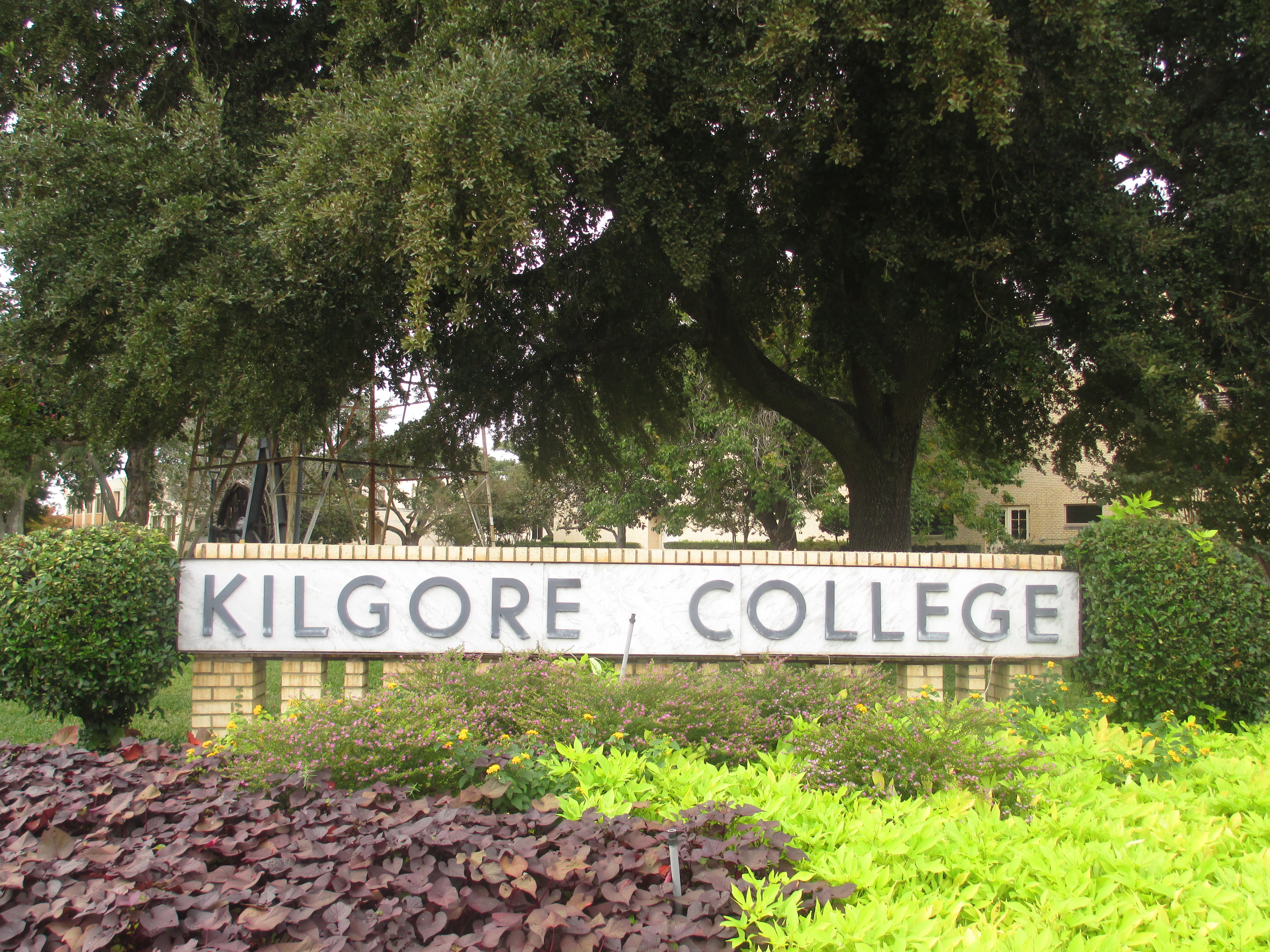
Welcome Sign

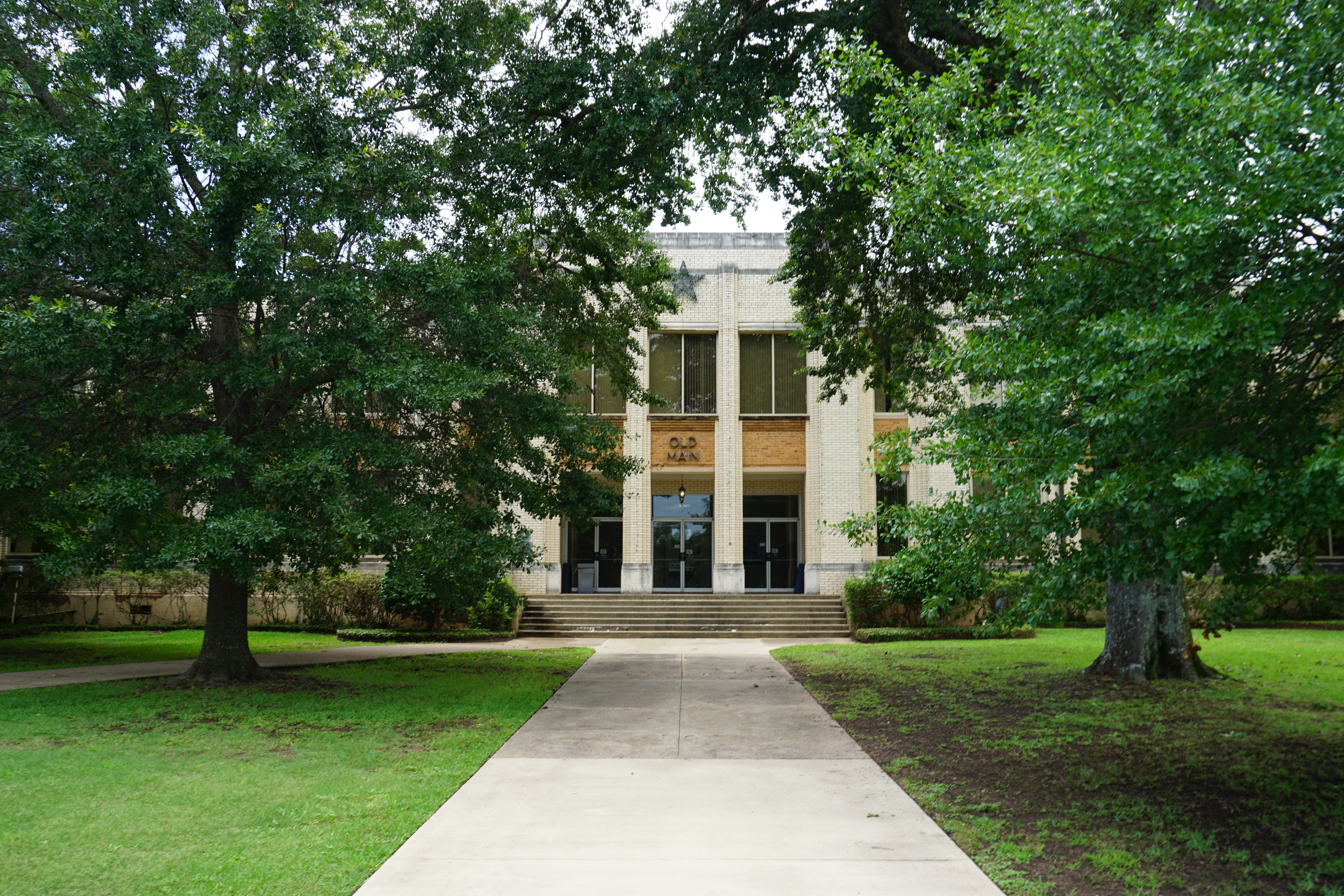
Old Main

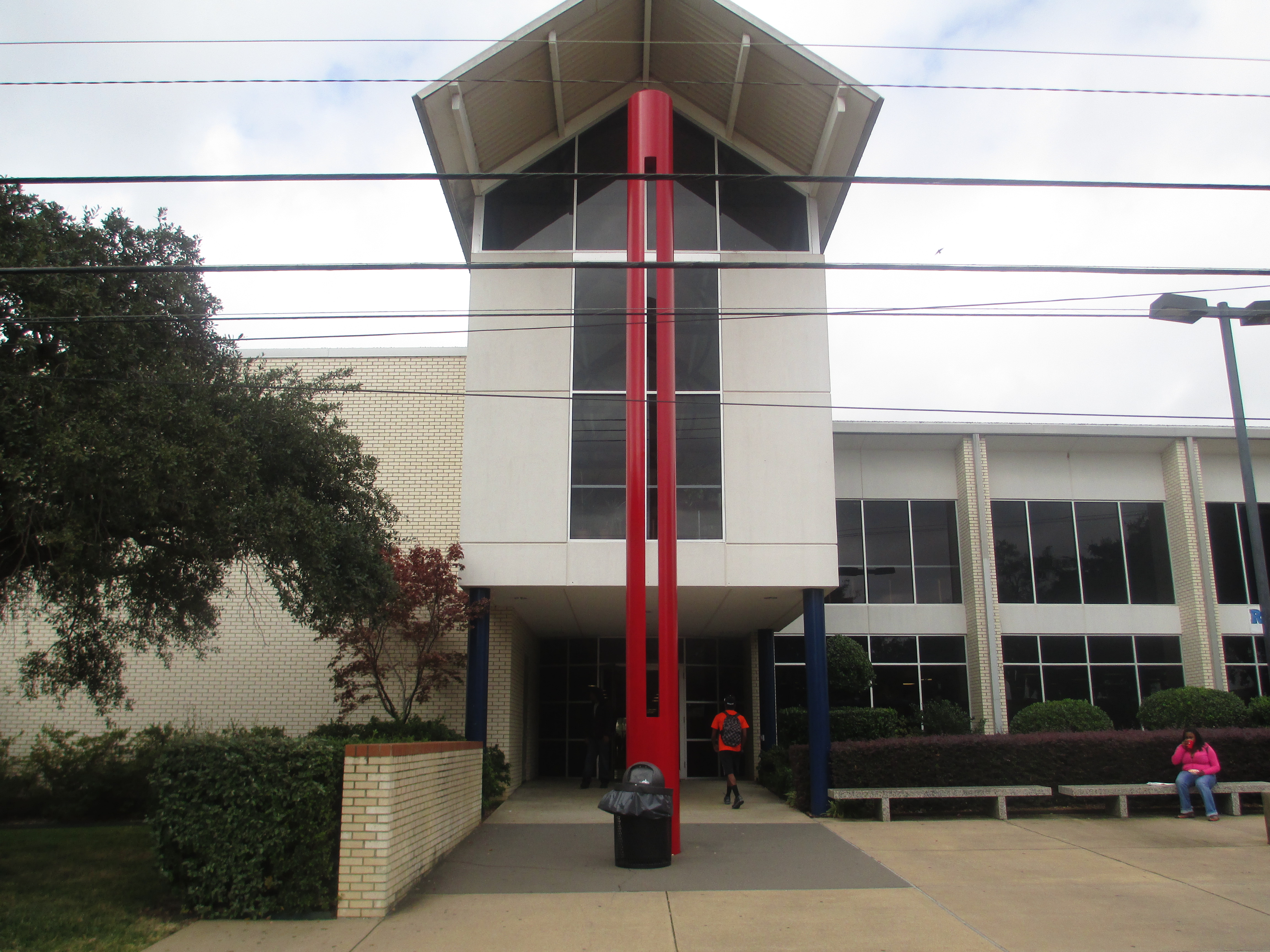
Student Center

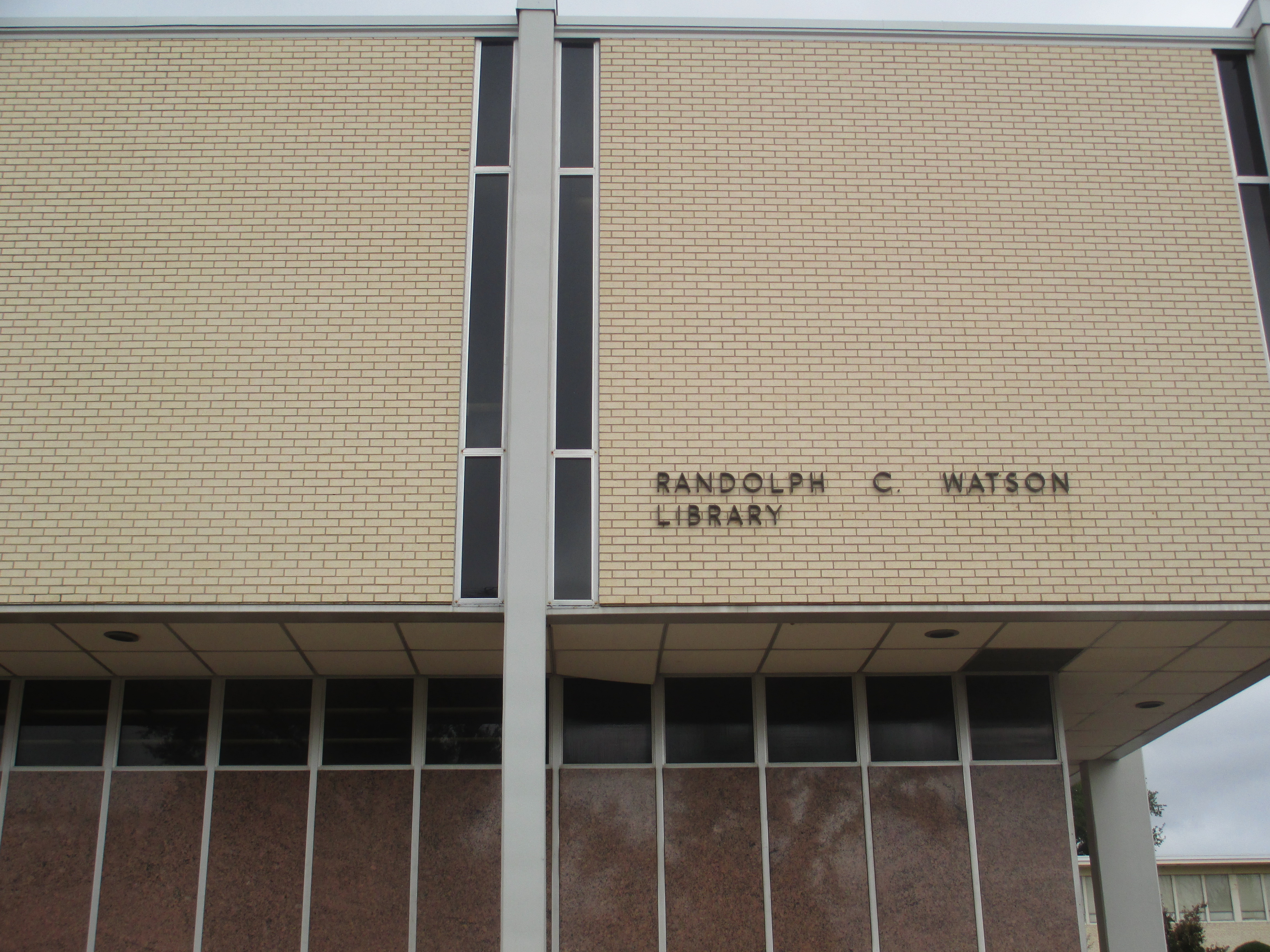
Randolph C. Watson Library

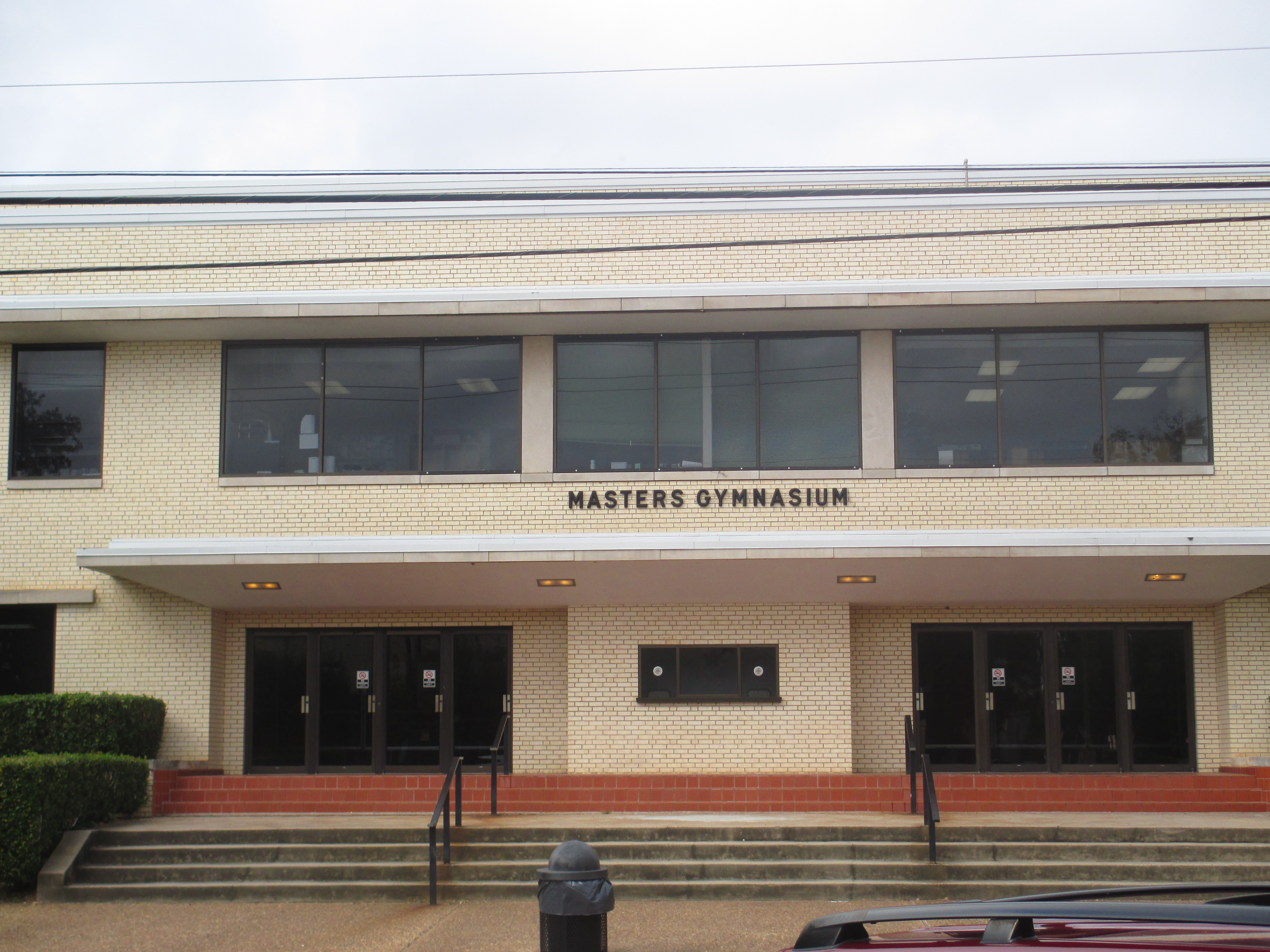
Masters Gymnasium

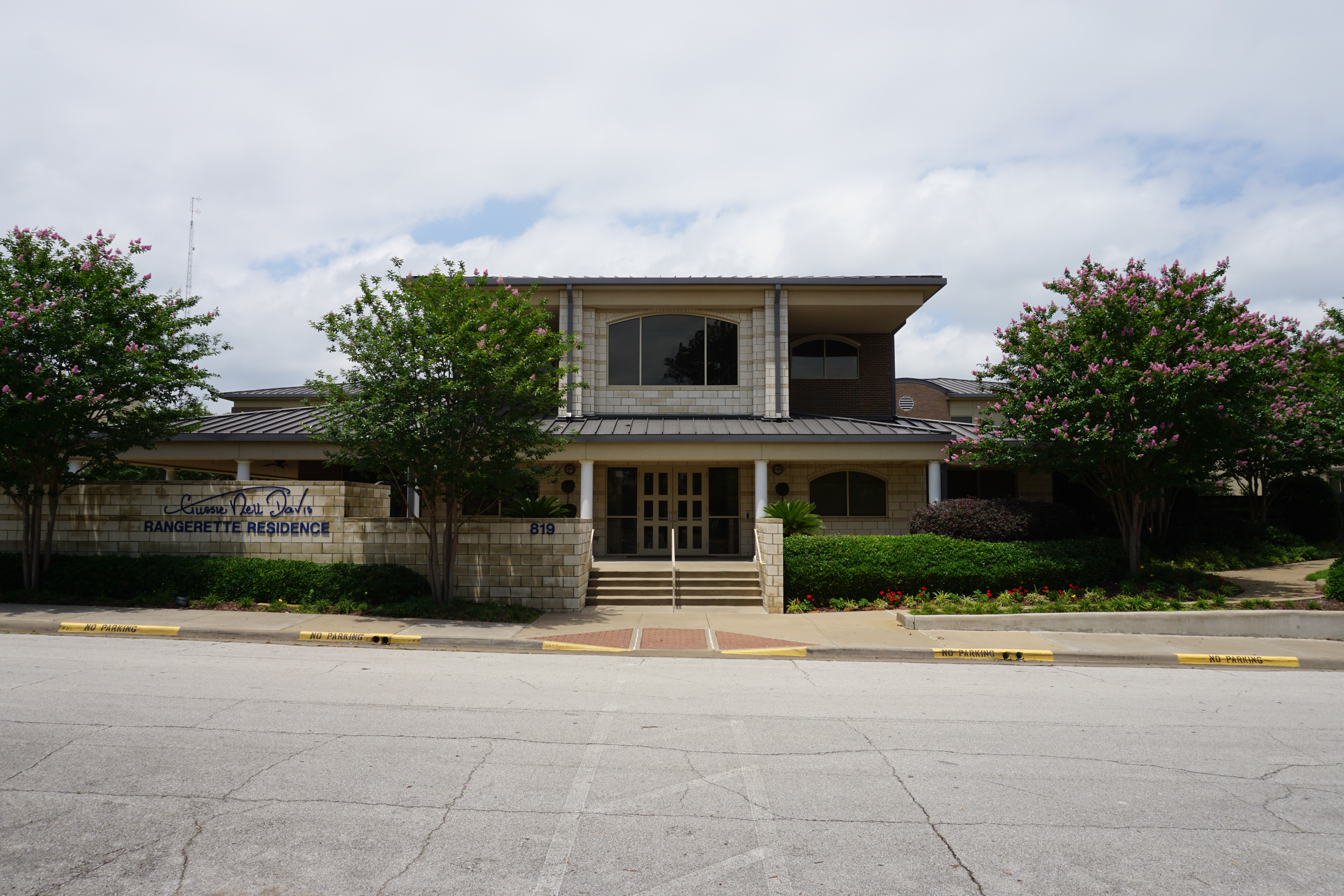
Gussie Nell Davis Rangerette Residence

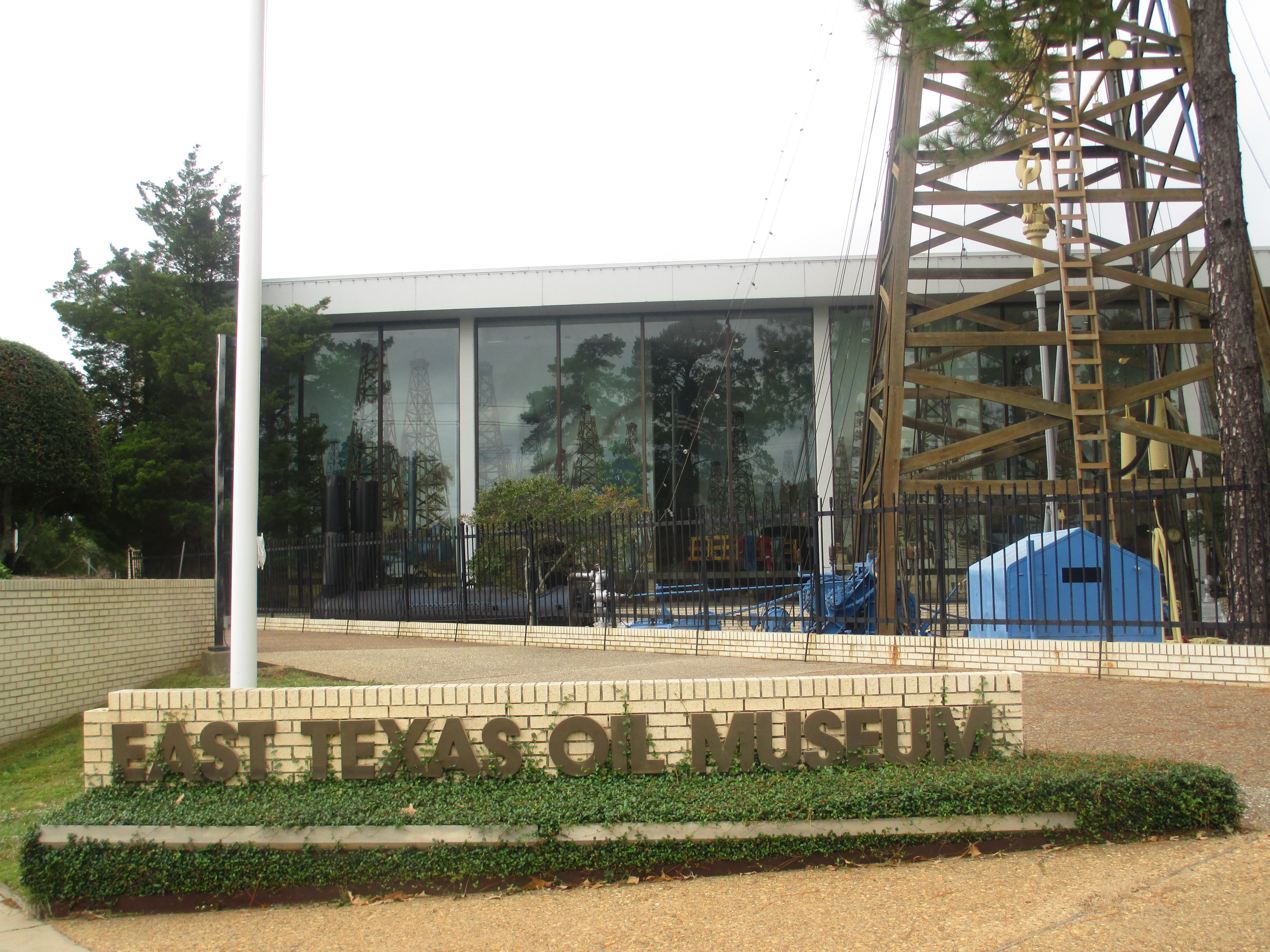
East Texas Oil Museum (established 1979) is located on the Kilgore College campus.

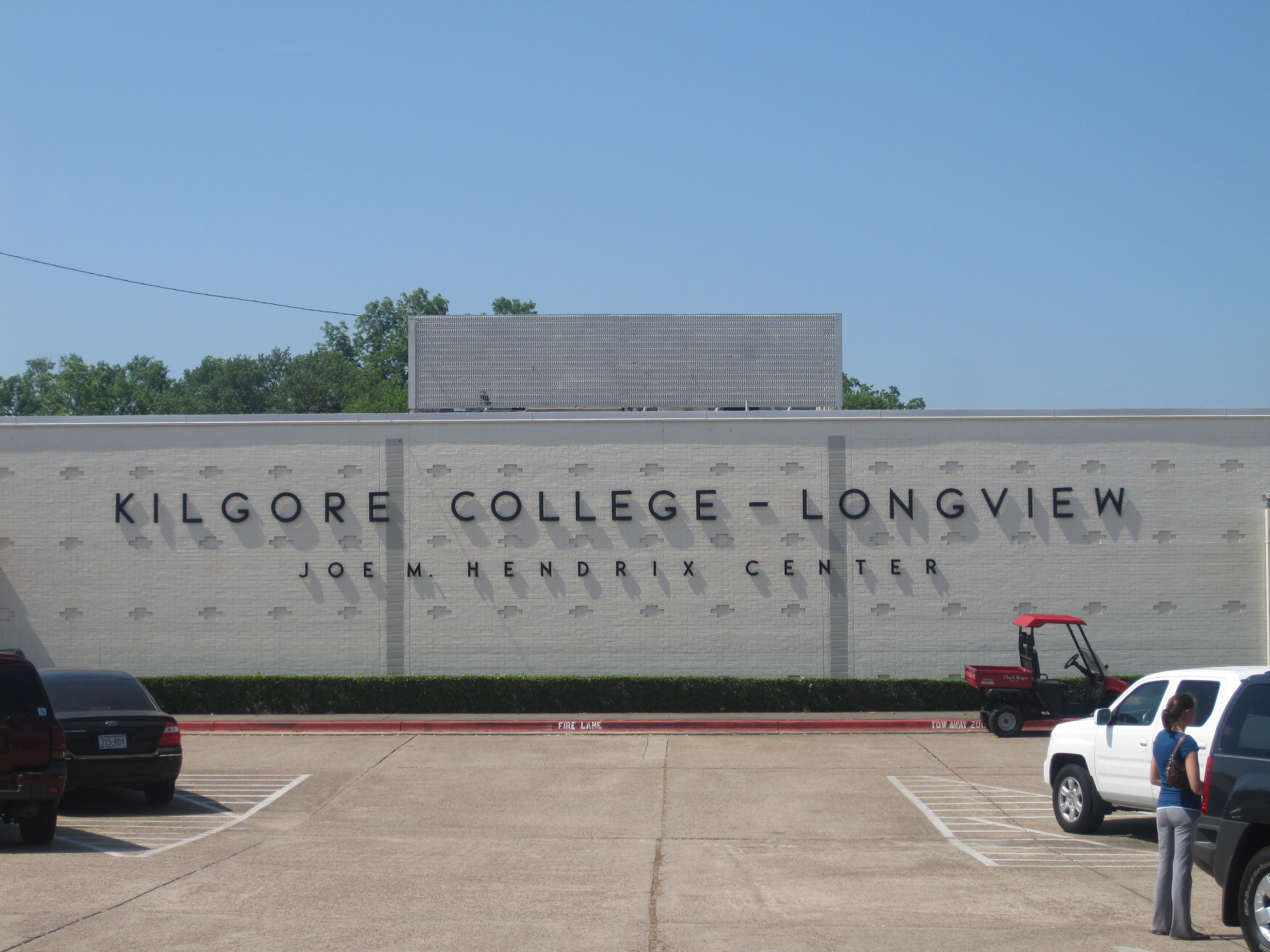
Kilgore College operates a branch campus in nearby Longview.

== Notable alumni ==
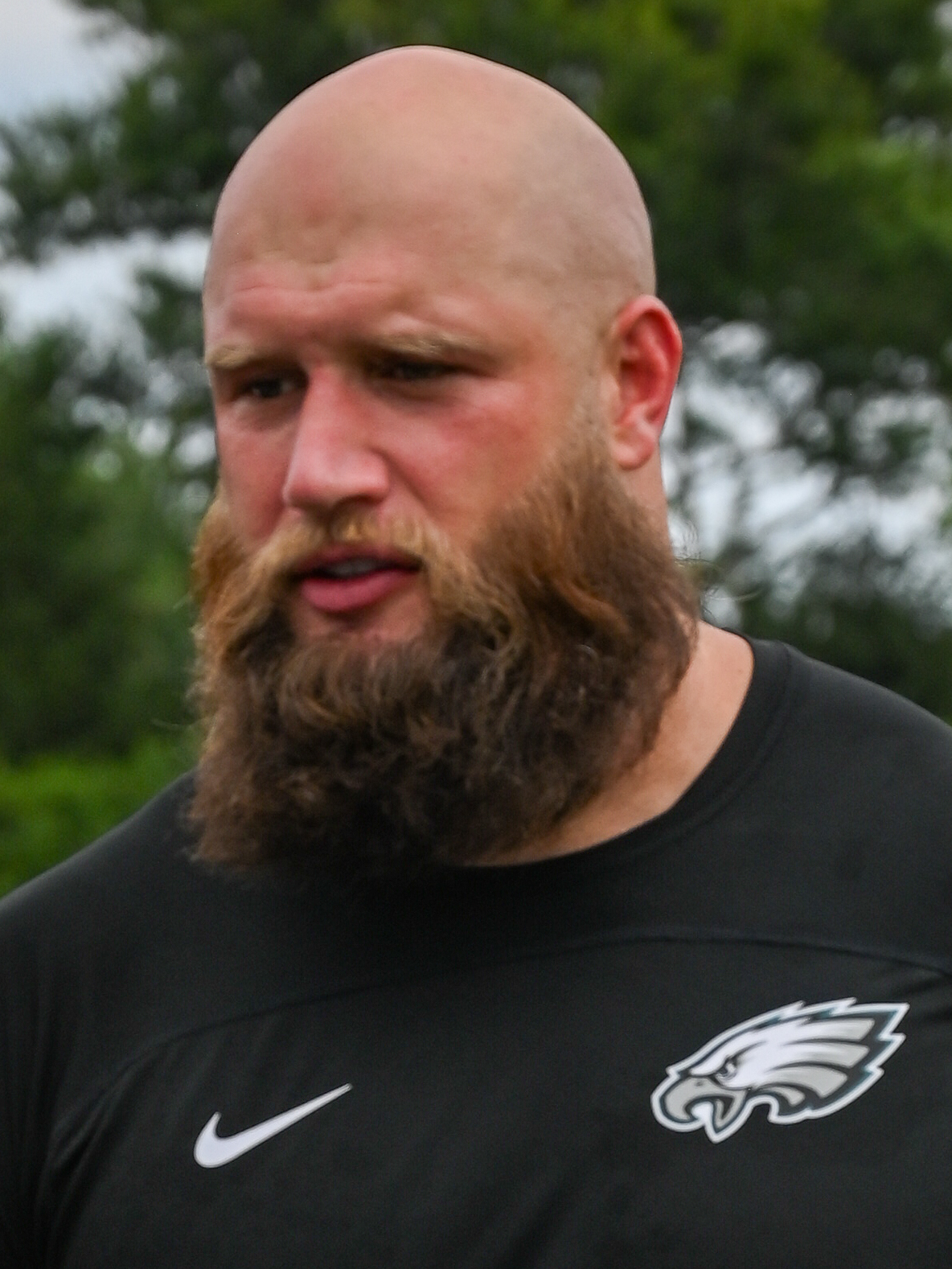
Lane Johnson

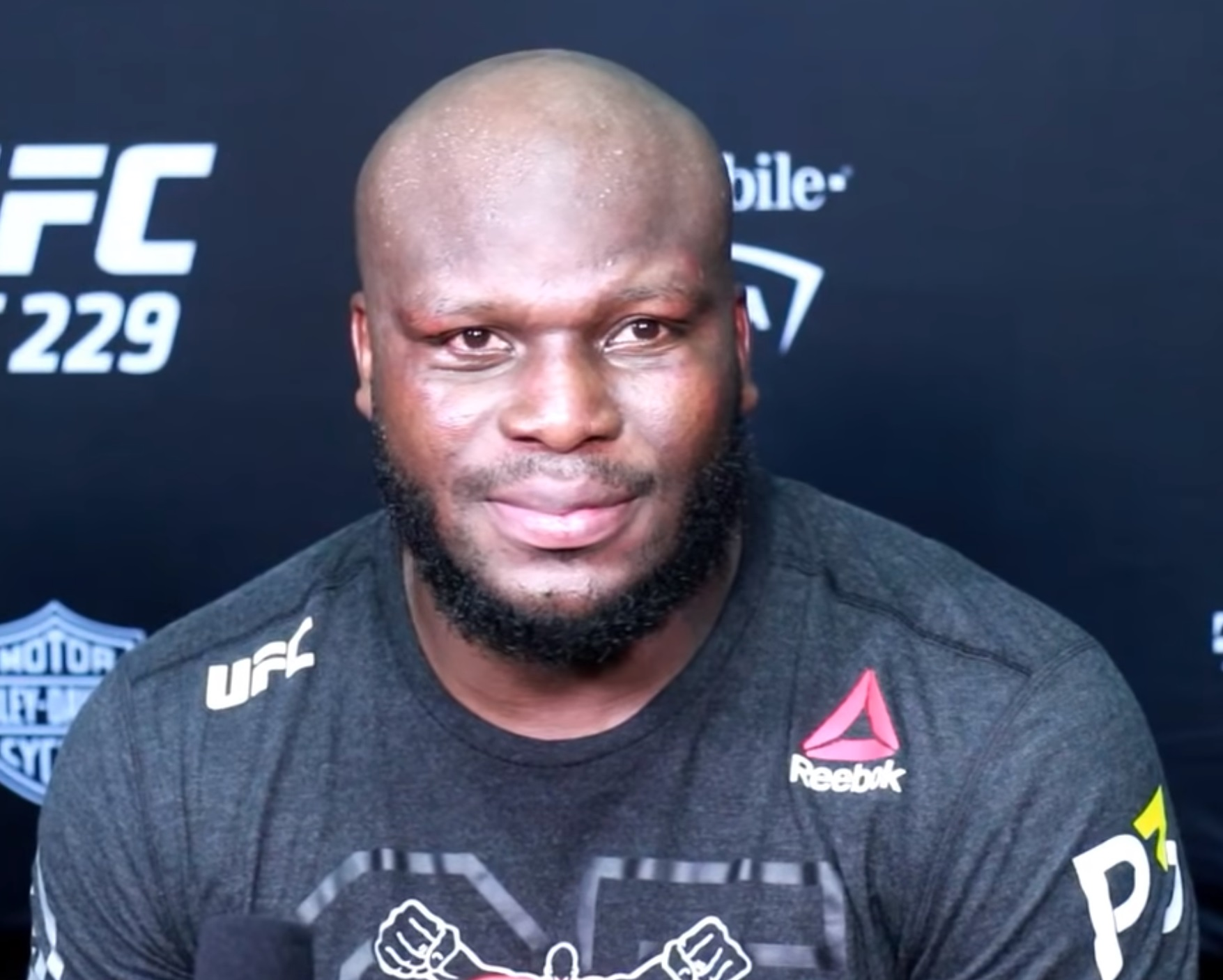
Derrick Lewis

- Lyle Alzado, professional football player
- Steve Bracey (1950–2006), professional basketball player
- Rodney Carrington, comedian
- Ricardo Colclough, professional football player
- Ricky Collins (born 1992), professional football player
- Jorge Diaz, professional football player
- Francisco Elson (born 1976), professional basketball player
- Kevin Everett (born 1982), professional football player
- Thomas Herrion (1981– 2005), professional football player
- John Hill (1923–2007), lawyer, politician, and judge
- Lane Johnson (born 1990), professional football player
- Derrick Lewis (born 1985), mixed martial artist
- Dwayne Stovall, Cleveland, businessperson and politician
- Marcus Thornton (born 1987), professional basketball player
- Marvin White (born 1983), professional football player
- Demorrio Williams (born 1980), professional football player
- Jason Williams, professional basketball player
- Darren Woodard (born 1989), professional football player
- LeJuandro 'Kai' Zeiglar, professional football player
