= Laird Hill, Texas =

Neighborhood of Kilgore, United States

Laird Hill
- Unincorporated community
- Location within the state of Texas Laird Hill (the United States)
- Coordinates: 32°21′12″N 94°54′20″W
- Country: United States
- State: Texas
- County: Rusk
- Elevation: 463 ft (141 m)
- Time zone: UTC-6 (Central (CST))
  - Summer (DST): UTC-5 (CDT)
- Area codes: 903, 430
- GNIS feature ID: 1339478

Laird Hill is an unincorporated community in northwestern Rusk County, Texas, United States. According to the Handbook of Texas, the community had a population of 405 in 2000. It is located within the Longview, Texas metropolitan area.

== History ==
The area in what is known as Laird Hill today was named for a local family of settlers. It was originally known as Pistol Hill during the East Texas oil boom. The community's first postmaster was Ignatius S. Crutcher, who was appointed in 1936. Its population was 500 in 1940 with eight businesses; this went down to 461 and four businesses in 1970 and ended at 405 from 1980 through 2000, and the number of businesses went up from one to five.

On April 25, 1957, an F3 tornado struck the community.

== Geography ==
Laird Hill is located on Texas State Highway 42, just southwest of Kilgore on the northern boundary of Rusk County. It is also on Texas State Highway 135 and Farm to Market Road 2012.

== Education ==
The Leverett's Chapel Independent School District and the Kilgore Independent School District serve area students.
