= Selman City, Texas =

Selman City
- Unincorporated community
- Location within the state of Texas Selman City (the United States)
- Coordinates: 32°11′25″N 94°57′43″W
- Country: United States
- State: Texas
- County: Rusk
- Elevation: 407 ft (124 m)

Population (2000)
  - Total: 271
- Time zone: UTC-6 (Central (CST))
  - Summer (DST): UTC-5 (CDT)
- ZIP codes: 75689
- Area codes: 903, 430
- GNIS feature ID: 1377180

Selman City is an unincorporated community in western Rusk County, Texas, United States. According to the Handbook of Texas, the community had a population of 271 in 2000. It is located within the Longview, Texas metropolitan area.

== History ==
S.A. Selman discovered oil on his property in the 1930s, making Selman City an oilfield-dominant community. Raymond A. Crawford served as the first postmaster in 1939. The post office also served Turnertown and Joinerville. Its peak population was 450 in 1947-48, with seven businesses, which declined to 271 from 1980 through 2000 with two new businesses.

Although Selman City is unincorporated, it has a post office, with the ZIP code of 75689.

== Geography ==
Selman City is located along Texas State Highway 64 and Texas State Highway 42, 4 mi (6.4 km) southeast of New London in northwestern Rusk County.

== Education ==
Today, the community is served by the West Rusk County Consolidated Independent School District.
