= Glenfawn, Texas =

- Unincorporated community
- Location within Texas Location within the United States
- Coordinates: 31°54′50″N 94°51′25″W
- Country: United States
- State: Texas
- County: Rusk
- Elevation: 453 ft (138 m)
- Time zone: UTC-6 (Central (CST))
  - Summer (DST): UTC-5 (CDT)
- Area codes: 430, 903
- GNIS feature ID: 1378363

Glenfawn is an unincorporated community in Rusk County, located in the U.S. state of Texas. According to the Handbook of Texas, the community had a population of 16 in 2000. It is located within the Longview, Texas metropolitan area.

== Geography ==
Glenfawn is located on Farm to Market Road 2753, 16 mi (26 km) southwest of Henderson in southwestern Rusk County.

== Education ==
Glenfawn had its own school in 1884. Today, the community is served by the Laneville Independent School District.
