= Oren Arnold =

American journalist and novelist (1900–1980)

- Born: July 20, 1900; Minden, Texas, U.S.
- Died: August 30, 1980 (aged 80); Laguna Beach, California, U.S.
- Education: Rice University
- Occupations: Journalist, novelist
- Spouse: Adele Roensch

Oren Arnold (July 20, 1900 - August 30, 1980) was an American journalist and novelist. He worked for the Houston Chronicle, the El Paso Times, and The Arizona Republic. He authored 80 novels about the Old West, mostly while he was living in Phoenix, Arizona from 1933 to 1970. He was a student of Rice University where he was editor of the student newspaper, the "Thresher" and president of "writers club".
