= Anadarko, Texas =

Unincorporated community in Rusk County, Texas, United States

- Unincorporated community
- Location within Texas Location within the United States
- Coordinates: 31°55′42″N 94°52′30″W
- Country: United States
- State: Texas
- County: Rusk
- Elevation: 400 ft (120 m)
- Time zone: UTC-6 (Central (CST))
  - Summer (DST): UTC-5 (CDT)
- Area codes: 430 & 903
- GNIS feature ID: 1377936

Anadarko is an unincorporated community in Rusk County, Texas, United States. According to the Handbook of Texas, the community had a population of 30 in 2000.

== Geography ==
Anadarko is located on Farm to Market Road 1662, 16 mi (26 km) southwest of Henderson in southwestern Rusk County. U.S. Route 84 exits into Anadarko on Farm to Market Road 2753.

== See also ==
- List of unincorporated communities in Texas
