= Lake Cherokee, Texas =

- Census-designated place
- Location within Texas Location within the United States
- Coordinates: 32°21′35″N 94°39′00″W
- Country: United States
- State: Texas
- Counties: Rusk, Gregg

Area
  - Total: 16.525 sq mi (42.80 km^{2})
  - Land: 12.239 sq mi (31.70 km^{2})
  - Water: 4.286 sq mi (11.10 km^{2})
- Elevation: 345 ft (105 m)

Population (2020)
  - Total: 2,980
  - Density: 250.9/sq mi (96.9/km^{2})
- Time zone: UTC-6 (Central (CST))
  - Summer (DST): UTC-5 (CDT)
- Area codes: 430 & 903
- GNIS feature ID: 2586944

Lake Cherokee is an unincorporated community and census-designated place (CDP) in Gregg and Rusk counties, Texas, United States. Its population was 2,980 as of the 2020 census. Lake Cherokee is located 12 miles southeast of Gregg and northeastern Rusk counties on Cherokee Bayou. The lake is owned by the Cherokee Water Company to supply water for municipal, industrial, and recreational purposes. It has a capacity of 68,700 acre-feet. The lake impounds Cherokee Bayou. The top of the dam is at the elevation of 295 feet above the average sea level, but it has a max design of 291 feet above the average sea level.

== Geography ==
The community consists of housing development that surrounds Lake Cherokee, a reservoir on Cherokee Bayou, an east-flowing tributary of the Sabine River. Texas State Highway 149 forms the northern border of the CDP; the highway leads northwest 12 miles (19 km) to Longview and southeast 24 miles (39 km) to Carthage.

According to the U.S. Census Bureau, the community has an area of 16.525 square miles (42.80 km^{2}); 12.239 square miles (31.70 km^{2}) of its area is land, and 4.286 square miles (11.10 km^{2}) is water. About three-quarters of the area of the CDP is within Rusk County, with the remainder in Gregg County. The county line follows the center of the lake for the lower half of its reach. The upstream half of the lake is entirely within Rusk County.

== Demographics ==
Historical population
Census	Pop.	Note	%±
2010	3,071		—
2020	2,980		−3.0%
U.S. Decennial Census; 1850–1900 1910; 1920 1930 1940; 1950 1960 1970; 1980 1990 2000; 2010 2020

Lake Cherokee first appeared as a census designated place in the 2010 U.S. census.

Lake Cherokee CDP, Texas – Racial and ethnic composition Note: the US Census treats Hispanic/Latino as an ethnic category. This table excludes Latinos from the racial categories and assigns them to a separate category. Hispanics/Latinos may be of any race.
Race / Ethnicity (NH = Non-Hispanic)	Pop 2010	Pop 2020	% 2010	% 2020
White alone (NH)	2,510	2,331	81.73%	78.22%
Black or African American alone (NH)	244	204	7.95%	6.85%
Native American or Alaska Native alone (NH)	15	22	0.49%	0.74%
Asian alone (NH)	8	1	0.26%	0.03%
Native Hawaiian or Pacific Islander alone (NH)	1	0	0.03%	0.00%
Other race alone (NH)	0	11	0.00%	0.37%
Mixed race or Multiracial (NH)	49	102	1.60%	3.42%
Hispanic or Latino (any race)	244	309	7.95%	10.37%
Total	3,071	2,980	100.00%	100.00%

As of the 2020 United States census, there were 2,980 people, 1,424 households, and 1,065 families residing in the CDP.

== Terrestrial ecosystem ==
Fauna:

Fish

- Largemouth Bass
- Channel Catfish
- Blue Catfish
- White Crappie
- Bluegill

== Education ==
Most of the CDP in Rusk County is in Tatum Independent School District while a portion in that county is in Kilgore Independent School District. The portion of the CDP in Gregg County is in the Longview Independent School District.

The boundary of Kilgore College includes the independent school districts of Kilgore, Longview, and Tatum (except for portions of Tatum ISD in Panola County). In other words, all parts of Lake Cherokee are in the service area of Kilgore College.

== Recreation ==
Lake Cherokee has recreational areas that include Arrowhead Park. Arrowhead Park has activities such as boating, library, a clubhouse, and a lake activity center.
