= Turnertown, Texas =

Unincorporated community in Rusk County, Texas, United States

- Unincorporated community
- Location within Texas Location within the United States
- Coordinates: 32°11′24″N 94°56′59″W
- Country: United States
- State: Texas
- County: Rusk
- Elevation: 456 ft (139 m)
- Time zone: UTC-6 (Central (CST))
  - Summer (DST): UTC-5 (CDT)
- Area codes: 430, 903
- GNIS feature ID: 1348918

Turnertown is an unincorporated community in Rusk County, Texas, United States. According to the Handbook of Texas, the community had a population of 76 in 2000. It is located within the Longview, Texas metropolitan area.

== History ==
On April 26, 1991, an F2 tornado struck Turnertown, uprooting several trees.

== Geography ==
Turnertown is located at the intersection of Texas State Highway 42 and Texas State Highway 64, 10 mi (16 km) west of Henderson and 21 mi (34 km) south of Longview in western Rusk County.

== Education ==
Today, the community is served by the West Rusk County Consolidated Independent School District.

== See also ==
- List of unincorporated communities in Texas
