= Mount Enterprise Independent School District =

School district in Texas

Mount Enterprise Independent School District is a public school district based in Mount Enterprise, Texas (USA). The district serves Mount Enterprise and portions of unincorporated Rusk County.

There is one campus in Mount Enterprise ISD - it serves both Mount Enterprise High (Grades 7-12) and Mount Enterprise Elementary (Grades PK-6).

The University Interscholastic League classifies MEISD as a "2A" school district.

In 2009, the school district was rated "academically acceptable" by the Texas Education Agency.
