= Billy Moore Unit =

Prison in Overton, Texas

Coordinates: 32°19′00″N 94°57′59″W

- Interactive map of Billy Moore Unit
- Location: 8500 FM 3053 North Overton, Texas
- Status: open
- Security class: G1, G2 (medium and minimum)
- Capacity: 513
- Opened: June 1995
- Managed by: Texas Department of Criminal Justice

The Billy Moore Unit a.k.a. the Billy Moore Correctional Center is a state prison for men located in Overton, Rusk County, Texas, operated (since September 2025) by the Texas Department of Criminal Justice.

The facility holds a maximum of 513 inmates at medium and minimum security levels. Prior to October 2008 the prison was operated by Corrections Corporation of America.
