= Elderville, Texas =

Unincorporated community in Texas, US

- Unincorporated community
- Location within Texas Location within the United States
- Coordinates: 32°22′21″N 94°43′43″W
- Country: United States
- State: Texas
- County: Gregg, Rusk
- Elevation: 367 ft (112 m)
- Time zone: UTC-6 (Central (CST))
  - Summer (DST): UTC-5 (CDT)
- Area codes: 430 & 903
- GNIS feature ID: 1379709

Elderville is an unincorporated community in Gregg and Rusk counties in Texas, United States. It is located along Texas State Highway 322 and Farm to Market Road 2011, about 3 miles (4.8 km) south-southwest of Lakeport.

== History ==
As a young man, William Jesse McDonald of the Texas Rangers operated a small store at Brown's Bluff (modern-day Elderville) on the Sabine in Gregg County, Texas.

== See also ==
- List of unincorporated communities in Texas
