= Leverett's Chapel, Texas =

Leverett's Chapel
- Unincorporated community
- Location within the state of Texas Leverett's Chapel (the United States)
- Coordinates: 32°18′45″N 94°55′22″W
- Country: United States
- State: Texas
- County: Rusk
- Elevation: 479 ft (146 m)
- Time zone: UTC-6 (Central (CST))
  - Summer (DST): UTC-5 (CDT)
- ZIP codes: 75684
- Area codes: 903, 430
- GNIS feature ID: 2034770

Leverett's Chapel is an unincorporated community in northwestern Rusk County, Texas, United States. According to the Handbook of Texas, the community had a population of 450 in 2000. It is located within the Longview, Texas metropolitan area.

== History ==
Leverett's Chapel once had a Cherokee village located about a mile southwest. It was named for the Leverett family, who settled here in the 1850s after traveling here by oxcart from Savannah, Georgia, and lived in a log house. It consolidated into their colonial mansion in 1937. After moving there from Georgia, they also brought with them some slaves, cattle, and supplies to build plantations. They were also joined by families surnamed Christian, Russell, Hindman, Honzell, Chappell, Hinkle, Still, and Florence. Oil was then discovered here in December 1932, changing it from a cotton and farming community. New settlers lived in garages, tents, and other different homes. Its population was 450 from 1987 through 2000.

== Geography ==
Leverett's Chapel is located on Texas State Highway 42, 4 mi (6.4 km) from Overton and 7 mi (11 km) south of Kilgore in northwestern Rusk County.

== Education ==
E. A. Leverett and her family donated an acre of land for a combination school and church sometime before 1890. The school had 11 teachers employed. In 1933, it became the Leverett's Chapel Independent School District and had as many as 600 students in the 1933–1934 school year. The Starr-Bailey School was a separate school for Black students. It joined the Leverett's Chapel School in 1966 and had a 1:13 student-teacher ratio by the 1970s.
