= Rusk County, Texas =

County in Texas, United States

- County
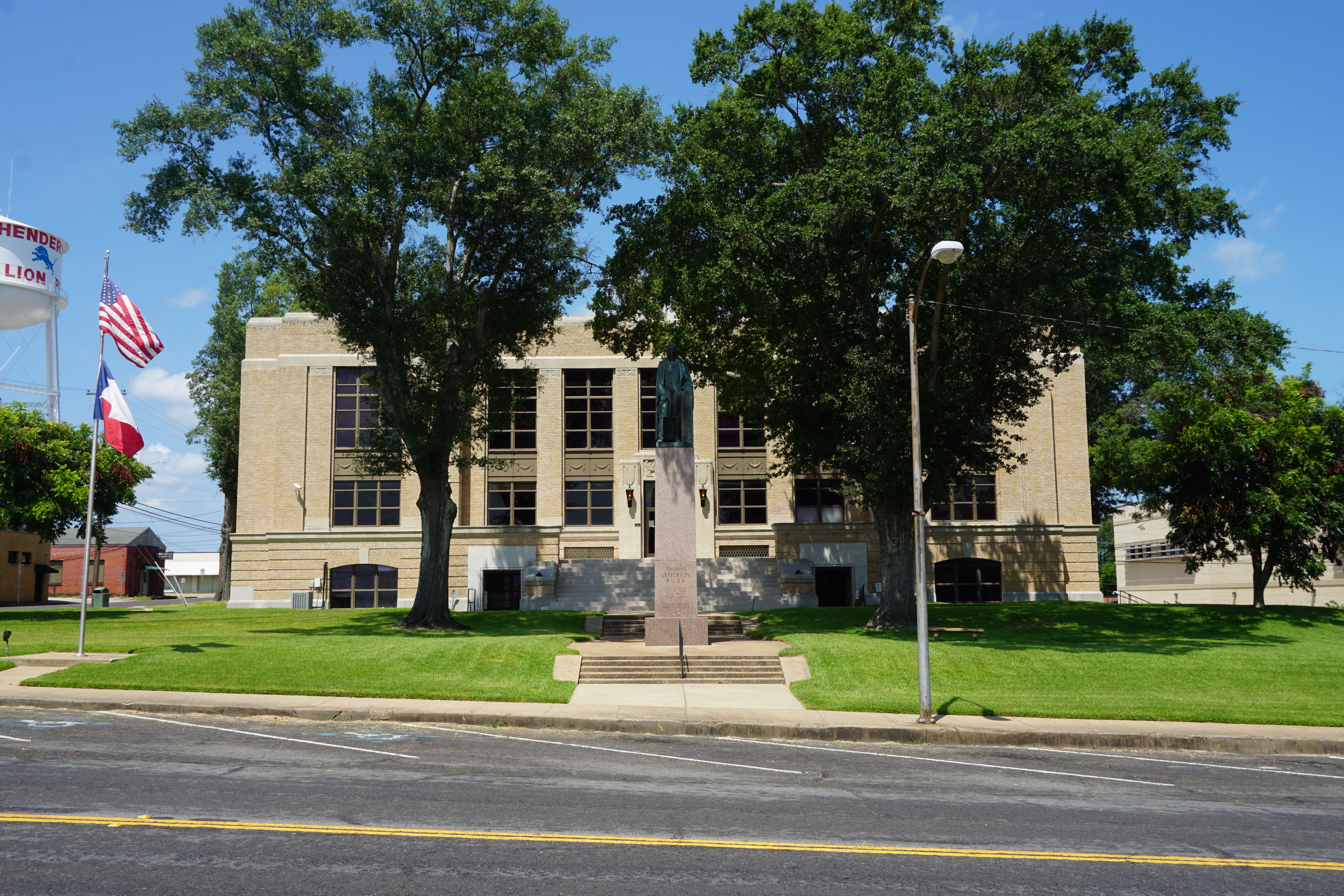
- Rusk County Courthouse in Henderson

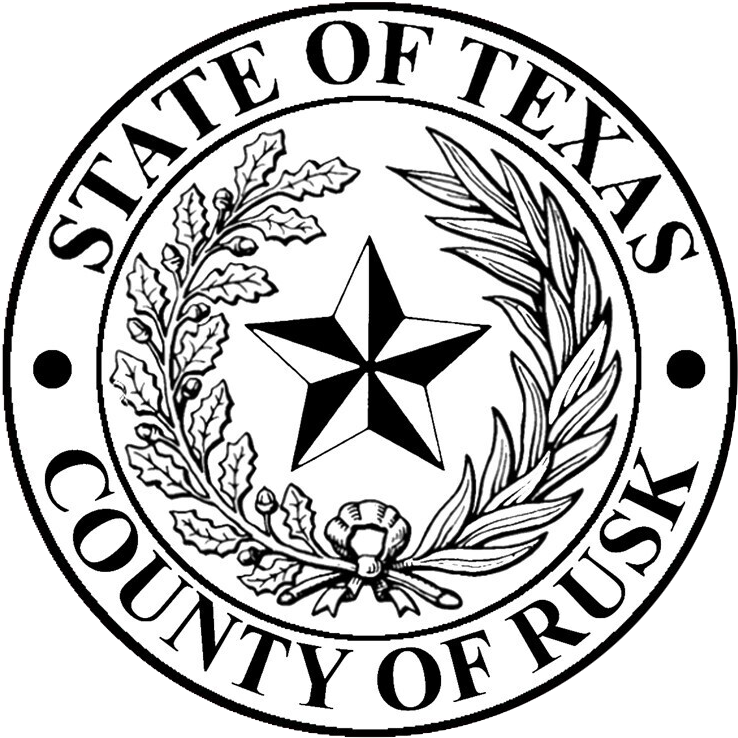
- Seal

- Location within the U.S. state of Texas
- Coordinates: 32°07′N 94°46′W
- Country: United States
- State: Texas
- Founded: 1843
- Named for: Thomas Jefferson Rusk
- Seat: Henderson
- Largest city: Henderson

Area
  - Total: 938 sq mi (2,430 km^{2})
  - Land: 924 sq mi (2,390 km^{2})
  - Water: 14 sq mi (36 km^{2}) 1.5%

Population (2020)
  - Total: 52,214
  - Estimate (2025): 54,854 ▲
  - Density: 56.5/sq mi (21.8/km^{2})
- Time zone: UTC−6 (Central)
  - Summer (DST): UTC−5 (CDT)
- Congressional district: 1st
- Website: www.ruskcountytx.gov

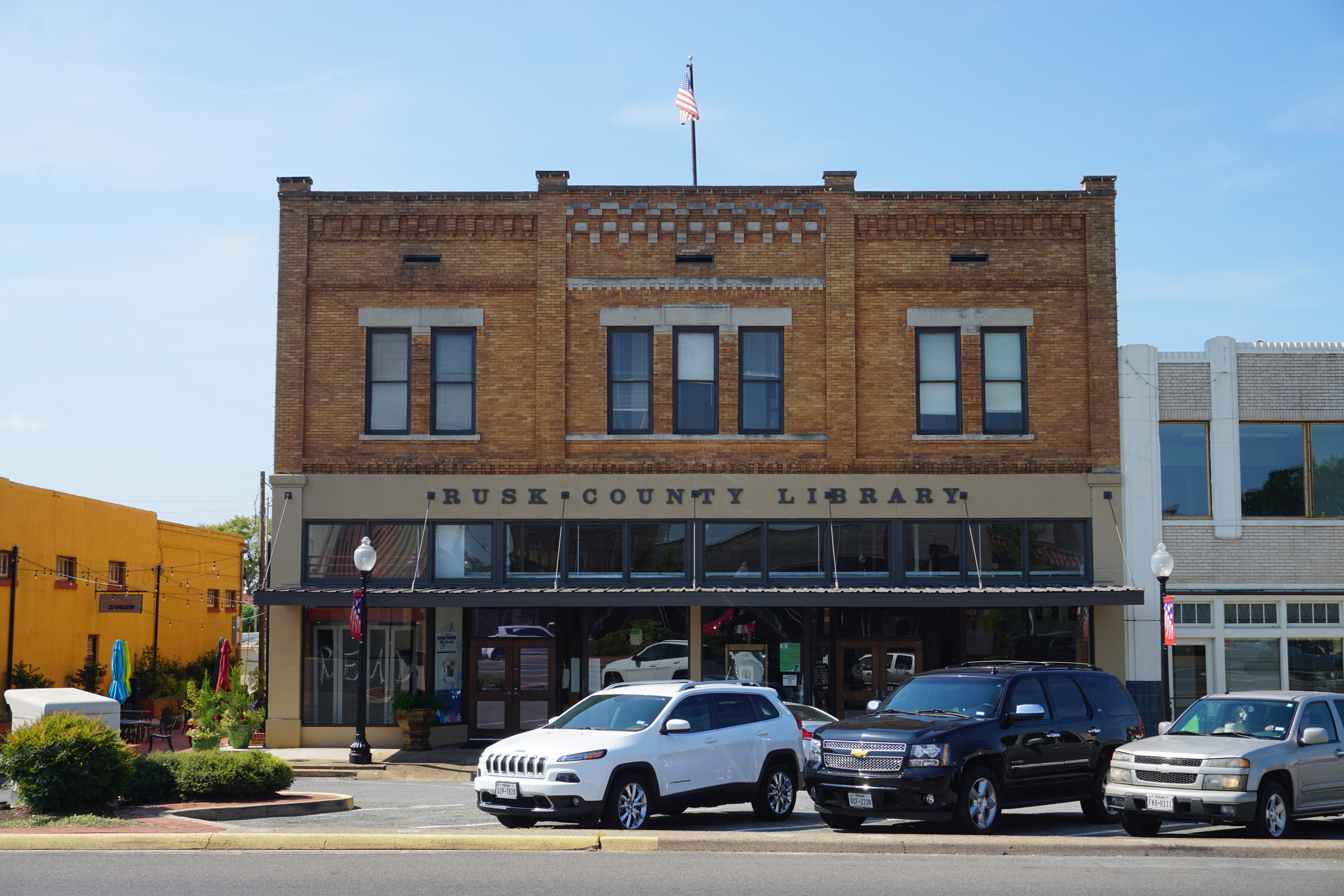
Rusk County Library in downtown Henderson

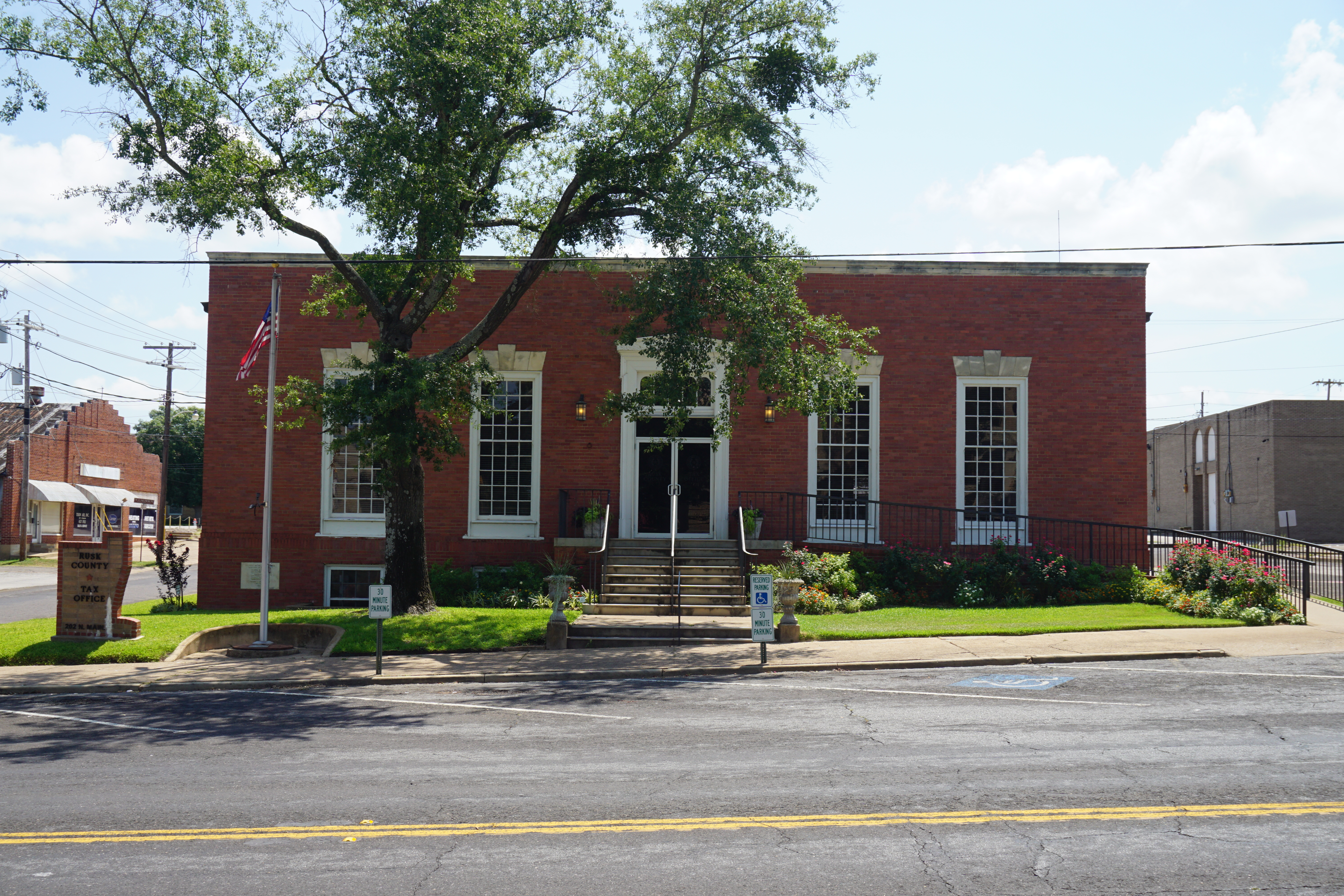
Rusk County Tax Office in Henderson

Rusk County is a county located in Texas. As of the 2020 census, its population was 52,214. Its county seat is Henderson. The county is named after Thomas Jefferson Rusk, a secretary of war of the Republic of Texas.

Rusk County is part of the Longview, Texas metropolitan area.

== History ==
Prior to Texas' annexation in 1845, the land while from time to time occupied by Caddoan peoples, was generally unpopulated until 1819, when Cherokee Indians, led by The Bowl settled in what is now Rusk County. The Treaty of Bowles Village on February 23, 1836, between the Republic of Texas and the Cherokee and 12 affiliated tribes, gave parts of western Rusk County along with parts of today's Gregg and Van Zandt Counties, in addition to the whole areas of Cherokee and Smith Counties to the tribes. They remained on these lands until the Cherokee War in the summer of 1839. Thus the Cherokee were driven out of Rusk County only to return in 1844 and 1845 with the purchase of 10,000 acres of land by Benjamin Franklin Thompson a white man married to a Cherokee. This established the Mount Tabor Indian Community, some six miles south of present-day Kilgore that later spread to incorporate areas near Troup, Arp and Overton, Texas. Originally organized as a part of Nacogdoches County, Rusk was established as its own county by the Congress of the Republic of Texas on January 16, 1843. By 1850, it was the second-most populous county in Texas of the 78 counties that had been organized at that time, according to the 1850 census. Rusk County's population was 8,148 then; it was surpassed only by Harrison County with 11,822 people.

With the discovery of oil in Joinerville, within the county, in October 1930, an oil boom began that caused county population to nearly double during the next decade, and caused dramatic changes in the county towns. Rusk is one of the five counties that are part of the East Texas Oil Field, whose production has been a major part of the economy since that time.

Rusk County was one of 25 entirely dry counties in Texas until January 2012. The city of Henderson at that time opted to allow selling and serving beer and wine.

America's worst school disaster happened in Rusk County in 1937, when nearly 300 people, most of them children, were killed in a natural gas explosion at the London Independent School District (which has since consolidated into West Rusk County Consolidated Independent School District).

== Geography ==
According to the U.S. Census Bureau, the county has a total area of 938 square miles (2,430 km^{2}), of which 14 square miles (36 km^{2}) (1.5%) are covered by water.

=== Major highways ===
- U.S. Highway 59
  - Interstate 69 is currently under construction and will follow the current route of U.S. 59 in most places.
- U.S. Highway 79
- U.S. Highway 84
- U.S. Highway 259
- State Highway 42
- State Highway 43
- State Highway 64
- State Highway 135
- State Highway 149
- State Highway 204
- State Highway 315
- State Highway 322
- State Highway 323
- Loop 43
- Loop 571

=== Adjacent counties ===
- Smith County (northwest)
- Gregg County (north)
- Harrison County (northeast)
- Panola County (east)
- Shelby County (southeast)
- Nacogdoches County (south)
- Cherokee County (southwest)

== Communities ==
=== Cities ===
- Easton (mostly in Gregg County)
- Henderson (county seat)
- Kilgore (mostly in Gregg County)
- Mount Enterprise
- New London
- Overton (partly in Smith County)
- Reklaw (partly in Cherokee County)
- Tatum (partly in Panola County)

=== Census-designated place ===
- Lake Cherokee (partly in Gregg County)

=== Unincorporated communities ===
- Anadarko
- Brachfield
- Bryce
- Caledonia
- Chalk Hill
- Chapman
- Church Hill
- Concord
- Dirgin
- Glenfawn
- Good Springs
- Hickey
- Joinerville
- Laird Hill
- Laneville
- Leverett's Chapel
- Minden
- Monroe
- New Salem
- Oak Hill
- Pine Hill
- Pitner Junction
- Price
- Selman City
- Stewart
- Turnertown

=== Ghost towns ===
- Craig
- Cross Roads
- Harmony Hill
- Lawsonville
- London
- Oak Flats
- Pirtle
- Pleasant Grove
- Pone
- Sexton City

== Demographics ==
Historical population
| Census | Pop. | Note | %± |
|---|---|---|---|
| 1850 | 8,148 | | — |
| 1860 | 15,803 | | 93.9% |
| 1870 | 16,916 | | 7.0% |
| 1880 | 18,986 | | 12.2% |
| 1890 | 18,559 | | −2.2% |
| 1900 | 26,099 | | 40.6% |
| 1910 | 26,946 | | 3.2% |
| 1920 | 31,689 | | 17.6% |
| 1930 | 32,484 | | 2.5% |
| 1940 | 51,023 | | 57.1% |
| 1950 | 42,348 | | −17.0% |
| 1960 | 36,421 | | −14.0% |
| 1970 | 34,102 | | −6.4% |
| 1980 | 41,382 | | 21.3% |
| 1990 | 43,735 | | 5.7% |
| 2000 | 47,372 | | 8.3% |
| 2010 | 53,330 | | 12.6% |
| 2020 | 52,214 | | −2.1% |
| 2025 (est.) | 54,854 | ▲ | 5.1% |
U.S. Decennial Census; 1850–2010 2010 2020

=== 2020 census ===
As of the 2020 census, the county had a population of 52,214. The median age was 40.0 years; 22.0% of residents were under 18 and 17.8% were 65 or older. For every 100 females, there were 110.2 males, and for every 100 females 18 and over, there were 112.4 males 18 and over. The disproportionate numbers are due to institutionalized men.

The racial makeup of the county was 64.9% White, 15.9% Black or African American, 0.8% American Indian and Alaska Native, 0.4% Asian, <0.1% Native Hawaiian and Pacific Islander, 9.8% from some other race, and 8.1% from two or more races. Hispanic or Latino residents of any race comprised 18.3% of the population.

About 35.9% of residents lived in urban areas, while 64.1% lived in rural areas.

Of the 18,173 households in the county, 33.2% had children under 18 living in them, 52.5% were married-couple households, 16.6% were households with a male householder and no spouse or partner present, and 26.2% were households with a female householder and no spouse or partner present. About 24.2% of all households were made up of individuals, and 11.9% had someone living alone who was 65 or older.

The county had 21,107 housing units, of which 13.9% were vacant. Among occupied housing units, 77.0% were owner-occupied and 23.0% were renter-occupied. The homeowner vacancy rate was 1.7% and the rental vacancy rate was 11.8%.

=== Racial and ethnic composition ===
Rusk County, Texas – Racial and ethnic composition Note: the US Census treats Hispanic/Latino as an ethnic category. This table excludes Latinos from the racial categories and assigns them to a separate category. Hispanics/Latinos may be of any race.
| Race / Ethnicity (NH = Non-Hispanic) | Pop 1980 | Pop 1990 | Pop 2000 | Pop 2010 | Pop 2020 | % 1980 | % 1990 | % 2000 | % 2010 | % 2020 |
|---|---|---|---|---|---|---|---|---|---|---|
| White alone (NH) | 31,503 | 32,899 | 33,737 | 35,237 | 32,022 | 76.13% | 75.22% | 71.22% | 66.07% | 61.33% |
| Black or African American alone (NH) | 8,896 | 8,924 | 9,037 | 9,359 | 8,240 | 21.50% | 20.40% | 19.08% | 17.55% | 15.78% |
| Native American or Alaska Native alone (NH) | 77 | 115 | 143 | 199 | 195 | 0.19% | 0.26% | 0.30% | 0.37% | 0.37% |
| Asian alone (NH) | 50 | 49 | 112 | 203 | 231 | 0.12% | 0.11% | 0.24% | 0.38% | 0.44% |
| Native Hawaiian or Pacific Islander alone (NH) | x | x | 3 | 14 | 18 | x | x | 0.01% | 0.03% | 0.03% |
| Other race alone (NH) | 26 | 12 | 21 | 50 | 162 | 0.06% | 0.03% | 0.04% | 0.09% | 0.31% |
| Multiracial (NH) | x | x | 321 | 659 | 1,767 | x | x | 0.68% | 1.24% | 3.38% |
| Hispanic or Latino (any race) | 830 | 1,736 | 3,998 | 7,609 | 9,579 | 2.01% | 3.97% | 8.44% | 14.27% | 18.35% |
| Total | 41,382 | 43,735 | 47,372 | 53,330 | 52,214 | 100.00% | 100.00% | 100.00% | 100.00% | 100.00% |

=== 2000 census ===
According to the 2000 census, 47,372 people, 17,364 households, and 12,727 families resided in the county. The population density was 51 people per square mile (20 people/km^{2}). The 19,867 housing units averaged 22 units per square mile (8.5/km^{2}). The racial makeup of the county was 74.89% White, 19.21% Black or African American, 0.35% Native American, 0.24% Asian, 0.01% Pacific Islander, 4.22% from other races, and 1.09% from two or more races. About 8.44% of the population was Hispanic or Latino of any race.

Of the 17,364 households, 32.5% had children under 18 living with them, 58.2% were married couples living together, 11.2% had a female householder with no husband present, and 26.7% were not families. About 24.2% of all households was made up of individuals, and 12.9% had someone living alone who was 65 or older. The average household size was 2.57 and the average family size was 3.05.

In the county, the age distribution was 24.9% under 18, 8.30% from 18 to 24, 27.80% from 25 to 44, 23.30% from 45 to 64, and 15.60% who were 65 or older. The median age was 38 years. For every 100 females, there were 104.0 males. For every 100 females 18 and over, there were 103.1 males.

The median income in the county for a household was $32,898 and for a family was $39,185. Males had a median income of $30,956 versus $19,749 for females. The per capita income for the county was $16,674. About 10.9% of families and 14.6% of the population were below the poverty line, including 20.8% of those under 18 and 13.0% of those 65 or over.

Rusk County is home to three privately run facilities for state prisoners - the East Texas Multi-Use Facility for treatment of state inmates, privately operated by the Management and Training Corporation; the Bradshaw State Jail, also private, placed in idle status as of August 2020 because of declining populations; and the Billy Moore Correctional Center, also privately run by MTC.

== Education ==
These school districts serve Rusk County:

- Carlisle Independent School District (ISD)
- Cushing ISD (mostly in Nacogdoches County)
- Garrison ISD (mostly in Nacogdoches County)
- Henderson ISD
- Kilgore ISD (mostly in Gregg County)
- Laneville ISD
- Leverett's Chapel ISD
- Mount Enterprise ISD
- Overton ISD
- Rusk ISD (mostly in Cherokee County)
- Tatum ISD (partly in Panola County)
- West Rusk CC ISD

Rusk County's first officially authorized school was the Rusk County Academy.

== Politics ==
Rusk County is represented by Bryan Hughes, a Republican from Mineola, Texas, in the Texas State Senator for Senate District 1, which includes Rusk County. Joanne Shofner, a Republican, is the Texas State Representative for House District 11, which includes Rusk County. Trent Ashby, a Republican from Lufkin who was born in Rusk County in 1972, represents District 57, which includes Angelina and several other mostly rural East Texas counties.

United States presidential election results for Rusk County, Texas
| Year | Republican | | Democratic | | Third party(ies) | |
| Year | No. | % | No. | % | No. | % |
|---|---|---|---|---|---|---|
| 1912 | 488 | 21.86% | 1,453 | 65.10% | 291 | 13.04% |
| 1916 | 521 | 20.29% | 1,849 | 72.00% | 198 | 7.71% |
| 1920 | 745 | 26.02% | 1,555 | 54.31% | 563 | 19.66% |
| 1924 | 651 | 17.06% | 3,097 | 81.18% | 67 | 1.76% |
| 1928 | 1,033 | 37.36% | 1,732 | 62.64% | 0 | 0.00% |
| 1932 | 483 | 8.68% | 5,074 | 91.16% | 9 | 0.16% |
| 1936 | 433 | 6.61% | 6,107 | 93.27% | 8 | 0.12% |
| 1940 | 704 | 8.17% | 7,901 | 91.73% | 8 | 0.09% |
| 1944 | 637 | 9.31% | 5,232 | 76.45% | 975 | 14.25% |
| 1948 | 1,294 | 17.55% | 4,322 | 58.60% | 1,759 | 23.85% |
| 1952 | 5,634 | 49.68% | 5,694 | 50.21% | 12 | 0.11% |
| 1956 | 5,140 | 59.96% | 3,381 | 39.44% | 52 | 0.61% |
| 1960 | 6,001 | 55.36% | 4,390 | 40.50% | 449 | 4.14% |
| 1964 | 5,488 | 45.61% | 6,528 | 54.25% | 17 | 0.14% |
| 1968 | 3,739 | 29.80% | 4,078 | 32.50% | 4,729 | 37.69% |
| 1972 | 8,179 | 73.87% | 2,867 | 25.89% | 26 | 0.23% |
| 1976 | 6,800 | 52.65% | 6,063 | 46.95% | 52 | 0.40% |
| 1980 | 8,705 | 60.17% | 5,582 | 38.58% | 180 | 1.24% |
| 1984 | 11,081 | 70.40% | 4,599 | 29.22% | 61 | 0.39% |
| 1988 | 9,117 | 63.70% | 5,140 | 35.91% | 56 | 0.39% |
| 1992 | 7,560 | 45.61% | 5,391 | 32.53% | 3,623 | 21.86% |
| 1996 | 8,423 | 54.22% | 5,988 | 38.55% | 1,123 | 7.23% |
| 2000 | 11,611 | 69.81% | 4,841 | 29.10% | 181 | 1.09% |
| 2004 | 13,390 | 72.99% | 4,899 | 26.71% | 55 | 0.30% |
| 2008 | 13,646 | 72.89% | 4,983 | 26.62% | 93 | 0.50% |
| 2012 | 13,924 | 75.08% | 4,451 | 24.00% | 171 | 0.92% |
| 2016 | 14,675 | 76.70% | 3,935 | 20.57% | 524 | 2.74% |
| 2020 | 16,534 | 77.28% | 4,629 | 21.63% | 233 | 1.09% |
| 2024 | 17,234 | 79.40% | 4,337 | 19.98% | 135 | 0.62% |

United States Senate election results for Rusk County, Texas1
| Year | Republican | | Democratic | | Third party(ies) | |
| Year | No. | % | No. | % | No. | % |
|---|---|---|---|---|---|---|
| 2024 | 16,665 | 77.43% | 4,500 | 20.91% | 357 | 1.66% |

United States Senate election results for Rusk County, Texas2
| Year | Republican | | Democratic | | Third party(ies) | |
| Year | No. | % | No. | % | No. | % |
|---|---|---|---|---|---|---|
| 2020 | 16,367 | 77.28% | 4,455 | 21.03% | 357 | 1.69% |

Texas Gubernatorial election results for Rusk County
| Year | Republican | | Democratic | | Third party(ies) | |
| Year | No. | % | No. | % | No. | % |
|---|---|---|---|---|---|---|
| 2022 | 12,762 | 81.66% | 2,697 | 17.26% | 169 | 1.08% |

== See also ==
- National Register of Historic Places listings in Rusk County, Texas
- Recorded Texas Historic Landmarks in Rusk County
- Mount Tabor Indian Community
