= Bradshaw State Jail =

Texas Department of Criminal Justice prison in Henderson, Texas, USA

Coordinates: 32°10′58″N 94°48′56″W

Bradshaw
- Interactive map of Bradshaw
- Location: 3900 W Loop 571 N Henderson, Texas
- Status: Operational
- Capacity: 1984
- Opened: July 1995; operated by Texas Department of Criminal Justice since September 1st 2025
- Managed by: Texas Department of Criminal Justice

The Bradshaw State Jail is a medium-security prison for men located in Henderson, Rusk County, Texas, owned and operated by the Texas Department of Criminal Justice. and it has an official capacity of 1828 inmates.

This facility was first opened by Management and Training Corporation in July 1995.

As of August 31, 2020, the state placed this facility in idle status, due to the decreasing number of inmates during the COVID-19 pandemic.

This facility has since reopened as of October 2023.
