= Leverett's Chapel Independent School District =

School district in Texas

Coordinates: 32.3126°N 94.922°W

Location
- Leverett's Chapel, Texas; United States

District information
- Type: Public
- Superintendent: Josh Johnson

Other information
- Website: www.leverettschapelisd.net

Leverett's Chapel Independent School District is a public school district located in northwestern Rusk County, Texas that serves the unincorporated communities of Leverett's Chapel and Laird Hill. In 2017 it founded its academic rodeo team, and in 2021 has started a junior high basketball team.

== Academic achievement ==
In 2009, the school district was rated "academically acceptable" by the Texas Education Agency.

== Schools ==
- Leverett's Chapel High (Grades 9–12)
- Leverett's Chapel Junior High (Grades 6–8)
- Leverett's Chapel Elementary (Grades PK–5)

== See also ==
- List of school districts in Texas
