= Kilgore Independent School District =

School district in Texas

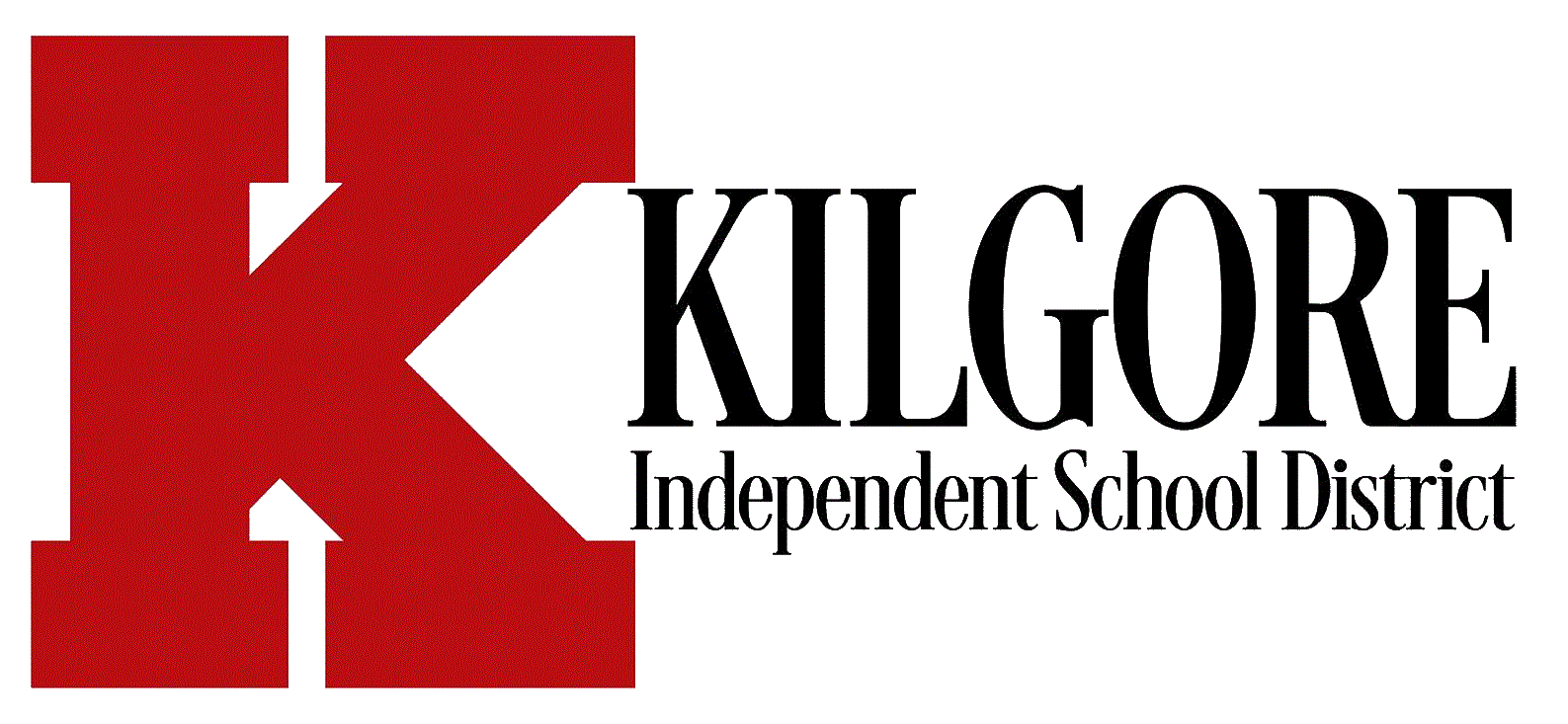

Address
- 301 North Kilgore Street, Downtown Kilgore Kilgore, (Gregg County and Rusk County), Texas, 75662; United States

District information
- Type: Public School District
- Motto: "Kilgore Proud", "Bulldog Strong"
- Grades: Pre-K – 12th grade
- Governing agency: Texas Education Agency
- Schools: 5
- NCES District ID: 4825620

Students and staff
- Students: 3,722
- Athletic conference: UIL
- District mascot: Bulldogs
- Colors: Red & White

Other information
- Website: www.kisd.org

Kilgore Independent School District (Kilgore ISD) is one of two public school districts serving the city of Kilgore. Headquartered in Downtown Kilgore, Texas, United States, the district encompasses most of Kilgore, extending into small portions of southern Longview, and provides its educational services to select communities within southern Gregg and northern Rusk counties, including a portion of the Lake Cherokee area.

During the 2015–2016 academic year, the district reported a dropout rate of 3.2%.

In 2019, Kilgore ISD received a grade of “B” under the Texas Education Agency’s accountability rating system.

Athletically, the district’s teams compete under the mascot name the Bulldogs.

== History ==
Kilgore Independent School District traces its origins to the early educational institutions of Kilgore. The first dedicated high school building was established in 1906 and served the community until 1913, when a larger facility was constructed to meet the needs of a growing student body. Prior to the formation of the independent school district, public education in Kilgore was primarily conducted in private homes and institutions like the Alexander Institute (which later became Lon Morris College in Jacksonville, Texas)

The discovery of oil in the East Texas Oil Field precipitated rapid district expansion. Under Superintendent W. L. Dodson’s leadership, Kilgore ISD established Kilgore College in the fall of 1935.

Also in 1935, the district constructed the Kilgore Colored School to serve African‑American students. In 1956, it was renamed C. B. Dansby School in honor of its principal, who led the school for 25 years. The institution remained segregated until desegregation in 1970; the original building was demolished in 2013, with a Texas Historical Marker preserving its legacy.

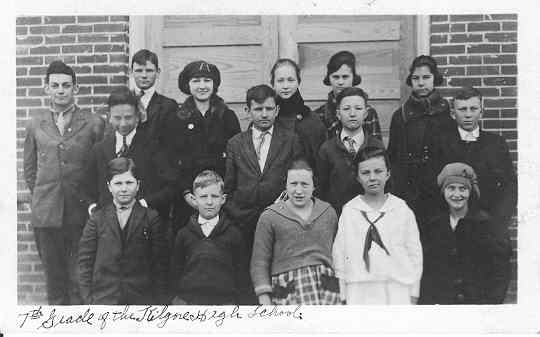
1920 Kilgore Middle School 7th Grade Class

The mid‑20th and early‑21st centuries saw continued growth in facilities. Chandler Elementary School opened in 1960 for second and third graders, Kilgore Intermediate School in 1995 for fourth and fifth grades, and — to accommodate a burgeoning student population — both Kilgore Primary and Kilgore Middle Schools commenced operations in 2013.

== Schools ==
- Kilgore High School (Grades 9–12)
- Kilgore Middle School (Grades 6–8)
- Kilgore Intermediate (Grades 4–5)
- Chandler Elementary (Grades 1–3)
- Kilgore Primary School (Grades PK–1)

== See also ==
- Sabine Independent School District, serves northern Kilgore
