= Harmony Hill, Texas =

Harmony Hill
- Unincorporated area
- Nickname: Nip 'N' Tuck
- Location within the state of Texas Harmony Hill (the United States)
- Coordinates: 32°16′52″N 94°34′01″W
- Country: United States
- State: Texas
- County: Rusk

Population
  - Total: no data
- Time zone: UTC-6 (Central (CST))
  - Summer (DST): UTC-5 (CDT)

Harmony Hill is an unincorporated area 15 miles northeast of Henderson and three miles southwest of Tatum in northeastern Rusk County, Texas, United States.

== History ==
The land for the town was donated by John W. Kuykendall, a prosperous plantation owner in the 1840s. The nickname of the town was Nip 'n' Tuck until it was officially named Harmony Hill in 1856. A post office was established in 1854, William P. Johnston was the postmaster, and the post office was closed in 1867. The post office was reopened in 1868 and closed in 1905, with mail then being delivered via Tatum. A Baptist church was the first church opened in the community. By 1860, the town had grown to 8-10 stores, a druggist, blacksmith, furniture factory, racetrack, Masonic lodge, doctor, and school. Due to being bypassed by the railroad, the town began to decline in the 1870s and 1880s. In 1906, many of the structures were destroyed by a tornado. Only a few homes and a cemetery remained in 1950. A 1984 county highway map showed a church and business in Harmony Hill. A historical marker now sits in the Harmony Hill Cemetery. The Harmony Hill Cemetery Association annually honors 20-25 buried Confederate soldiers.
