= Tatum Independent School District =

School district in Texas, United States

Tatum Independent School District is a public school district based in Tatum, Texas (USA).

In addition to Tatum, the district serves rural areas in northeastern Rusk and northwestern Panola counties. It includes most of Lake Cherokee. The portions of the district located within Rusk County are part of the Kilgore College community college taxation district.

In 2009, the school district was rated "recognized" by the Texas Education Agency.

== History ==
Mike Moses served as superintendent until circa 1985. In a period on or after 1985, Robert Barrett became superintendent of the district. On July 31, 1988, Barrett was scheduled to resign from his position.

In 2017 J.P. Richardson became the sole person considered for the superintendent position at Tatum ISD. He was previously the superintendent of the Gladewater Independent School District. Richardson expressed satisfaction in taking the Tatum job.

== Schools ==
- Tatum High (Grades 9-12)
- Tatum Middle (Grades 6-8)
- Tatum Elementary (Grades 3-5)
- Tatum Primary (Grades PK-2)

The district's athletic teams are known as the Eagles and compete in green and white school colors. In the 2024–25 season, the boys basketball team won the UIL 3A Division 1 state championship. Historically under the previous state accountability systems, Tatum ISD campuses frequently maintained "Recognized" or "Exemplary" ratings through the Texas Education Agency.
