= Mount Enterprise, Texas =

- City
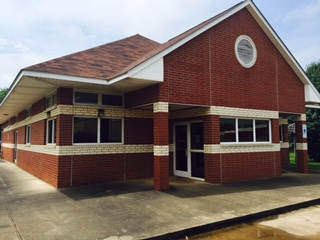
- US Post Office in Mount Enterprise, Texas, USA

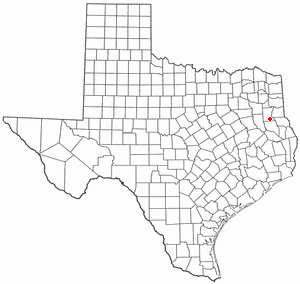
- Location of Mount Enterprise, Texas

- Coordinates: 31°54′42″N 94°40′58″W
- Country: United States
- State: Texas
- County: Rusk

Area
  - Total: 1.49 sq mi (3.85 km^{2})
  - Land: 1.49 sq mi (3.85 km^{2})
  - Water: 0 sq mi (0.00 km^{2})
- Elevation: 449 ft (137 m)

Population (2020)
  - Total: 505
  - Density: 340/sq mi (131/km^{2})
- Time zone: UTC-6 (Central (CST))
  - Summer (DST): UTC-5 (CDT)
- ZIP code: 75681
- Area codes: 903, 430
- FIPS code: 48-49728
- GNIS feature ID: 2411178
- Website: cityofmte.gov

Mount Enterprise is a city in Rusk County, Texas, United States. The population was 505 at the 2020 census.

== History ==
The city of Mount Enterprise, located south of Henderson in rural Rusk County, was named for a small elevation near the town and for the business enterprise of the Vinzent brothers, who settled it in 1832.

The town owes its existence to the presence of promising iron ore in the area. Charles Vinzent considered the "old mountain" nearby to be an "iron mountain," and he was not far off the mark; the brown, crumbly ore of the Weches formation that outcrops in the area has a better than 50 percent iron content. However, Vinzent's real enterprise came in the form of manufacturing and retailing. His factory made wagons, buggies, furniture, plows, caskets, and a patented churn. He launched a chain of stores to sell these products, and more, operating out of Mount Enterprise. At one time Vinzent had as many as four stores.

Lumbering was also an early industry of Mount Enterprise; the furniture factory it supported is dated as early as 1850. There were also numerous plantations in the area before the Civil War. In 1846 the Mulberry Grove post office was established with Henry Henson as postmaster. Three years later the name was changed to Mount Enterprise.

Mount Enterprise Male and Female College was begun in 1851, and it lasted until 1855. In 1853 Mount Enterprise Male and Female Academy was established. In 1880 the town had three sawmills, a hotel, two cotton gins, a school, three churches, and a population of 150.

In 1894 the Caro Northern Railway was chartered to operate as a logging road between Mount Enterprise and Caro, in Nacogdoches County, a distance of little over 16 miles. The railroad, which connected Mount Enterprise with the Texas and New Orleans Railroad, came to within a mile of Mount Enterprise, and the town then moved to the railroad. It became the new Mount Enterprise, and the old location was called the old Mount Enterprise.

The railroad was abandoned in 1934, but by 1939 the town had incorporated and still had a number of businesses, a bank, a post office, a newspaper, and a population of 920. After 1940 the population gradually declined to 485 in 1982, when the town had a bank, a post office, and fifteen businesses. In 1990 the population was 501. The population grew to 525 in 2000, but has since dropped to 447 according to the 2010 census.

== Geography ==
According to the United States Census Bureau, the city has a total area of 1.5 square miles (3.8 km^{2}), all land.

== Demographics ==
Historical population
Census	Pop.	Note	%±
1970	425		—
1980	485		14.1%
1990	501		3.3%
2000	525		4.8%
2010	447		−14.9%
2020	505		13.0%
U.S. Decennial Census; 2020 Census

=== 2020 census ===
As of the 2020 census, Mount Enterprise had a population of 505. The median age was 38.5 years. 26.1% of residents were under the age of 18 and 16.0% of residents were 65 years of age or older. For every 100 females there were 87.7 males, and for every 100 females age 18 and over there were 84.7 males age 18 and over.

0.0% of residents lived in urban areas, while 100.0% lived in rural areas.

There were 199 households in Mount Enterprise, of which 33.2% had children under the age of 18 living in them. Of all households, 49.2% were married-couple households, 16.1% were households with a male householder and no spouse or partner present, and 28.1% were households with a female householder and no spouse or partner present. About 27.7% of all households were made up of individuals and 13.0% had someone living alone who was 65 years of age or older.

There were 244 housing units, of which 18.4% were vacant. The homeowner vacancy rate was 4.1% and the rental vacancy rate was 0.0%.

Racial composition as of the 2020 census
Race	Number	Percent
White	391	77.4%
Black or African American	50	9.9%
American Indian and Alaska Native	4	0.8%
Asian	1	0.2%
Native Hawaiian and Other Pacific Islander	0	0.0%
Some other race	23	4.6%
Two or more races	36	7.1%
Hispanic or Latino (of any race)	68	13.5%

=== 2000 census ===
As of the 2000 census, there were 525 people, 206 households, and 155 families residing in the city. The population density was 355.9 inhabitants per square mile (137.4/km^{2}). There were 241 housing units at an average density of 163.4 per square mile (63.1/km^{2}). The racial makeup of the city was 91.05% White, 8.19% African American, and 0.76% from two or more races. Hispanic or Latino of any race were 1.71% of the population.

There were 206 households, out of which 30.1% had children under the age of 18 living with them, 64.6% were married couples living together, 7.8% had a female householder with no husband present, and 24.3% were non-families. 21.4% of all households were made up of individuals, and 15.5% had someone living alone who was 65 years of age or older. The average household size was 2.55 and the average family size was 2.97.

In the city, the population was spread out, with 25.7% under the age of 18, 7.6% from 18 to 24, 25.7% from 25 to 44, 22.5% from 45 to 64, and 18.5% who were 65 years of age or older. The median age was 39 years. For every 100 females, there were 95.9 males. For every 100 females age 18 and over, there were 88.4 males.

The median income for a household in the city was $25,577, and the median income for a family was $31,719. Males had a median income of $27,083 versus $20,125 for females. The per capita income for the city was $13,165. About 18.1% of families and 22.0% of the population were below the poverty line, including 33.9% of those under age 18 and 9.7% of those age 65 or over.

== Education ==
The City of Mount Enterprise is served by the Mount Enterprise Independent School District.
