= Henderson Independent School District =

Public school district in Henderson, Texas

Address
- 300 Crosby Drive, Henderson, TX 75652 East Texas Henderson, Rusk County, Texas, 75652

District information
- Motto: The Tradition of Excellence Continues
- Grades: Pre-K - 12
- Superintendent: Brian Bowman
- Asst. superintendent(s): Dr. Terry Everett, Dea Henry

Students and staff
- District mascot: Lions
- Colors: Red and blue

Other information
- Website: https://www.HendersonISD.org

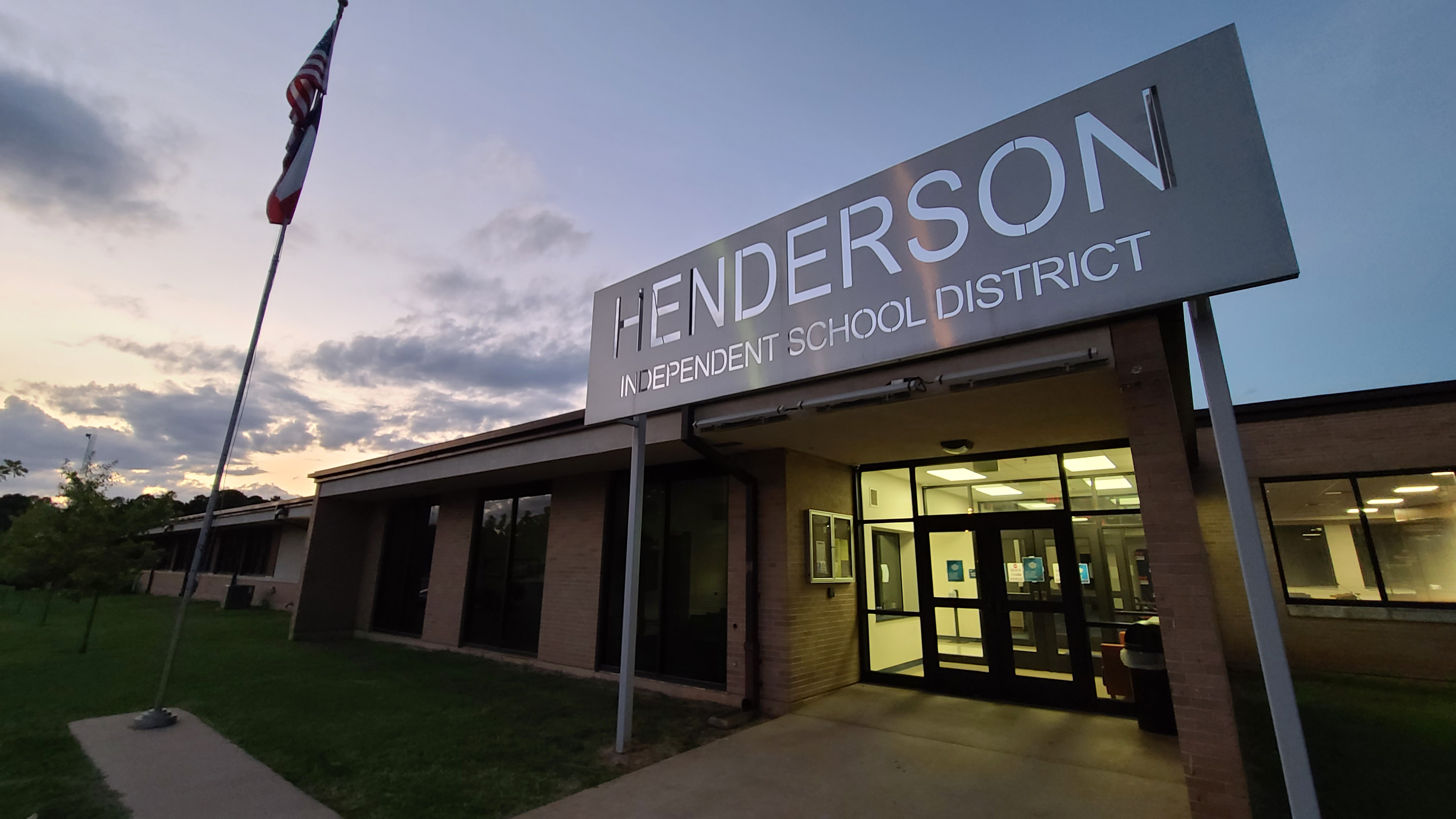
Front of the current Henderson ISD Administration building at 300 Crosby Drive in Henderson, Tx.

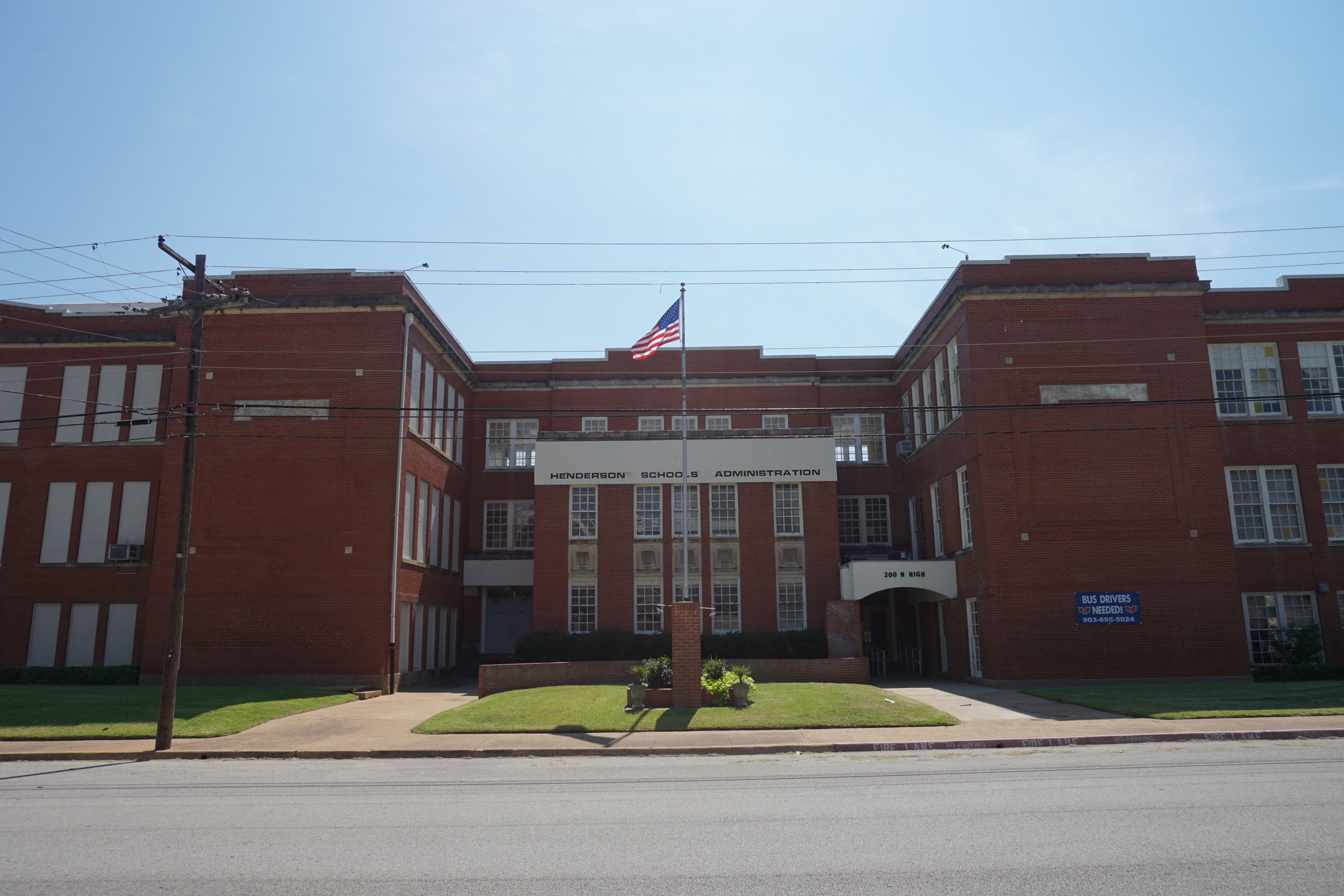
Henderson ISD Maintenance and Transportation Offices.

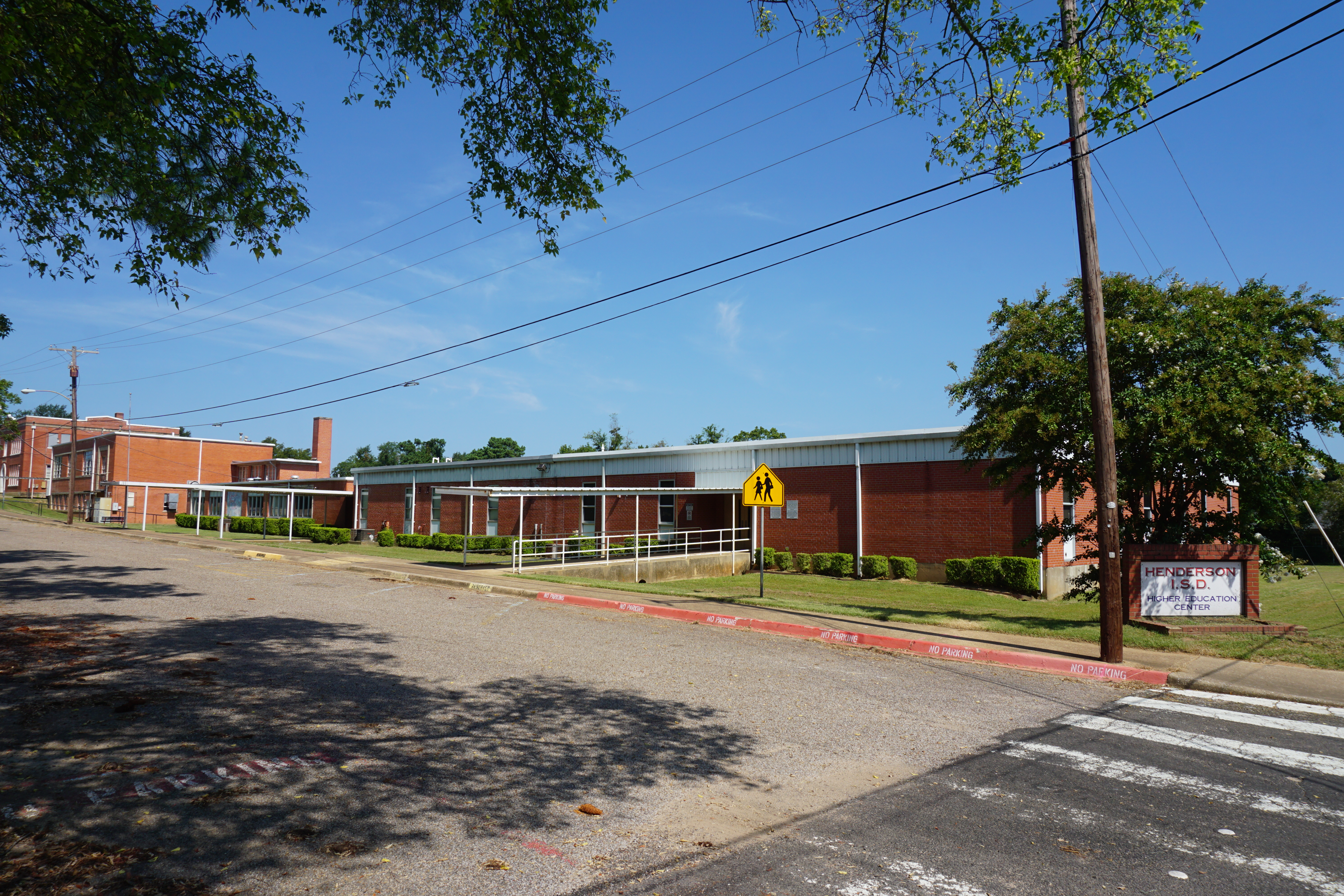
Henderson ISD Higher Education Center

Henderson Independent School District is a public school district based in Henderson, Texas (USA). HISD is the largest school district in Rusk County. Current enrollment is 3,365 students and the district employees just over 600 teachers, administrators and support staff. For the 2022-2023 fiscal year, the district has budgeted $41,079,314 in total revenues and $40,465,506 in expenses.

== History ==
In early 1949, Henderson ISD's coverage area was 16 square miles (41 km^{2}). Later in 1949, HISD began absorbing other area school districts. Motley, New Hope, Crim’s Chapel, Grandview, Roquemore, Oakland, Ebenezer, and Bethel were the first communities merged into Henderson ISD. Hickey joined the district in 1950 and Pinehill joined the district in 1951. With the addition of Pinehill, Henderson ISD's coverage area was 137.7 square miles (357 km^{2}). The district constructed a new Henderson High School building in 1953 due to the increased demand for a school building due to the new students coming from the consolidations.

In 2006, voters approved a $22 million bond to build two new campuses — each more than 100,000 square feet (9,300 m^{2}) in size — on about 50 acres (200,000 m^{2}) of land donated by the Wylie family of Henderson.

In 2009, the school district was rated "academically acceptable" by the Texas Education Agency.

In 2010, the Henderson Lion football team won the Texas 3-A Division 1 State Championship by defeating the Chapel Hill Bulldogs at Cowboys Stadium (AT&T Stadium) in Arlington, Texas.

Henderson High School's marching band became the 2012 3A state champions at the National Association of Military Marching Bands contest held in Bryan, Texas.

In 2013, voters approved the funding of a new middle school to be built in the same location as the old one. The 6th grade building is still used but the 7th, and 8th grade buildings wore torn down and rebuilt on the former middle school practice football field. Construction was completed in fall of 2015.

The Henderson High School Marching Band became the 2015 State Champions at the National Association of Military Marching Bands contest held in Carthage, Texas.

== Schools ==
- Henderson High School (grades 9–12)
  - Principal: Shannon Dickerson
- Henderson Middle School (grades 6–8)
  - Principal: Russell Wylie
  - The campus occupies a former building of Henderson High School, which was completed in 1953. In 1979 the high school moved to its current location, and Henderson Middle moved into the former high school building. A wing for science classes and sixth grade classes opened in 1997. In 2006 the gymnasium was renovated. The school was revamped once again in 2015, with a complete remodeling of the building and an extreme renovation of the football stadium. The new middle school, holding the same title, opened in November 2015.
- Northside Intermediate School (grades 4–5)
  - Principal: Dr. Christopher Chambers
- William E. Wylie Elementary School (grades 1–3)
  - Principal: Angela Crow
- Monnie Meyer Wylie Primary School (PreK-K)
  - Principal: Leslie Bowles
