= Longview metropolitan area, Texas =

Longview metropolitan area
- Metropolitan statistical area
- Longview, TX Metropolitan Statistical Area
- Downtown Longview, Texas
Interactive Map of Longview, TX MSA
City of Longview
City of Kilgore
City of Marshall
Longview, TX MSA
- Country: United States
- State: Texas
- Current largest city: Longview
- Other cities: Kilgore, Marshall

Area
  - Land: 2,550 sq mi (6,610 km^{2})

Population (2020)
  - Total: 286,184
  - Estimate (2025): 297,315
  - Rank: 173rd

GDP
  - Total: $20.259 billion (2022)
- Time zone: UTC−6 (CST)
  - Summer (DST): UTC−5 (CDT)

The Longview, TX Metropolitan Statistical Area is a metropolitan area in Northeast Texas that covers four counties—Gregg, Harrison, Rusk, and Upshur. The MSA had a population of 286,184 at the 2020 census, increasing to an estimated 297,315 by 2025. Prior to 2023, the Longview MSA and Marshall micropolitan area (µSA) were components of the Longview–Marshall combined statistical area; in 2023, the Marshall µSA was disestablished and its sole county, Harrison County, was made part of the Longview metropolitan area.

== History ==
The Office of Management and Budget (OMB) first defined the Longview metropolitan area in 1981, with the creation of the Longview–Marshall, TX Standard Metropolitan Statistical Area (SMSA) comprising Gregg and Harrison counties. Upshur County was added to the renamed Longview–Marshall, TX Metropolitan Statistical Area (MSA) in 1993. In 2003, Harrison County was split into the separate Marshall, TX Micropolitan Statistical Area (µSA), with Rusk County being added to the remaining Longview, TX MSA. The Longview MSA and Marshall µSA were both components of the Longview–Marshall, TX Combined Statistical Area (CSA). This configuration was used until 2023, when Harrison County was added back to the Longview MSA, dissolving the Marshall µSA and the Longview–Marshall CSA and giving the Longview MSA its current four-county form.

== Counties ==
- Gregg
- Harrison
- Rusk
- Upshur

== Communities ==
The following are cities, towns, and villages categorized based on the United States Census Bureau 2025 population estimates. No population estimates are released for census-designated places (CDPs), which are marked with an asterisk (*). These places are categorized based on their 2020 Census population.

=== Places with more than 25,000 people ===
- Longview (Principal city) (83,236)

=== Places with 10,000 to 25,000 people ===
- Marshall (24,467)
- Kilgore (13,531)
- Henderson (13,496)

=== Places with 1,000 to 10,000 people ===
- Gladewater (6,306)
- White Oak (6,186)
- Gilmer (5,287)
- Hallsville (4,895)
- Lake Cherokee* (2,980)
- Liberty City* (2,721)
- Overton (partial) (2,315)
- Waskom (1,980)
- Tatum (partial) (1,403)
- Big Sandy (1,339)
- Ore City (1,210)

=== Places with fewer than 1,000 people ===
- Lakeport (993)
- New London (993)
- East Mountain (972)
- Clarksville City (779)
- Mount Enterprise (517)
- Easton (507)
- Union Grove (477)
- Reklaw (partial) (349)
- Scottsville (341)
- Warren City (321)
- Uncertain (90)

=== Unincorporated communities ===
- Concord
- Diana
- Elderville
- Elysian Fields
- Harleton
- Joinerville
- Judson
- Laird Hill
- Laneville
- Leverett's Chapel
- Liberty City
- Nesbitt
- Price
- Selman City
- Turnertown

== Demographics ==
As of the census of 2000, there were 194,042 people, 73,341 households, and 52,427 families residing within the MSA. The racial makeup of the MSA was 75.71% White, 17.93% African American, 0.50% Native American, 0.48% Asian, 0.02% Pacific Islander, 4.02% from other races, and 1.33% from two or more races. Hispanic or Latino of any race were 8.03% of the population. The median income for a household in the MSA was $33,750 and the median income for a family was $40,220. Males had a median income of $31,786 versus $20,570 for females. The per capita income for the MSA was $17,160.

By the 2021 American Community Survey, there were 287,868 people residing in the Longview metropolitan area. Its racial makeup as of 2021 was 61% White, 16% African American, 1% Asian, 5% multiracial, and 17% Hispanic or Latino American of any race. With a median age of 38.3, 50% of the population was female, and 50% were male. The median household income within the metropolis was $56,777, and it had a per capita income of $29,315. An estimated 15.5% of the population lived at or below the poverty line.

According to the 2021 census estimates, there were 106,151 households and 60% were married-couples households; there was an average of 2.6 people per household. An estimated 48% of the population was married in contrast with 52% unmarried residents. Of its households, there were 121,614 housing units throughout the MSA. With an 87% occupancy rate, 71% were owner-occupied and 49% of the population from 2015-2017 were new residents. The median value of an owner-occupied housing unit was $155,700, with 30% of housing units for sale under $100,000 in 2021; approximately 18% of housing units were from $200,000 to $300,000.

As of 2020's religion census by the Association of Religion Data Archives, Baptists were the largest set of Christians, with Christianity being the predominant religion. Altogether, Baptists from the American Baptist Association, Full Gospel Baptist Church Fellowship, Free Will Baptists, National Baptists, National Missionary Baptists, and Southern Baptists numbered 88,811. Non/inter-denominational Protestants numbered 26,874. Other large Christian communities for the MSA were Methodists, Pentecostals, Jehovah's Witnesses, and Mormons. Its Catholic Christian community numbered 22,952.

County	Seat	2025 estimate	2020 Census	Change	Area	Density
Gregg	Longview	126,095	124,239	+1.49%	276 sq mi (715 km^{2})	457/sq mi (176/km^{2})
Harrison	Marshall	71,956	68,839	+4.53%	916 sq mi (2,372 km^{2})	79/sq mi (30/km^{2})
Rusk	Henderson	54,854	52,214	+5.06%	938 sq mi (2,429 km^{2})	58/sq mi (23/km^{2})
Upshur	Gilmer	44,410	40,892	+8.60%	593 sq mi (1,536 km^{2})	75/sq mi (29/km^{2})
Total		297,315	286,184	+3.89%	2,723 sq mi (7,053 km^{2})	109/sq mi (42/km^{2})

== Education ==
The MSA is home to LeTourneau University, Kilgore College, and the University of Texas at Tyler's Longview University Center.

== Transportation ==
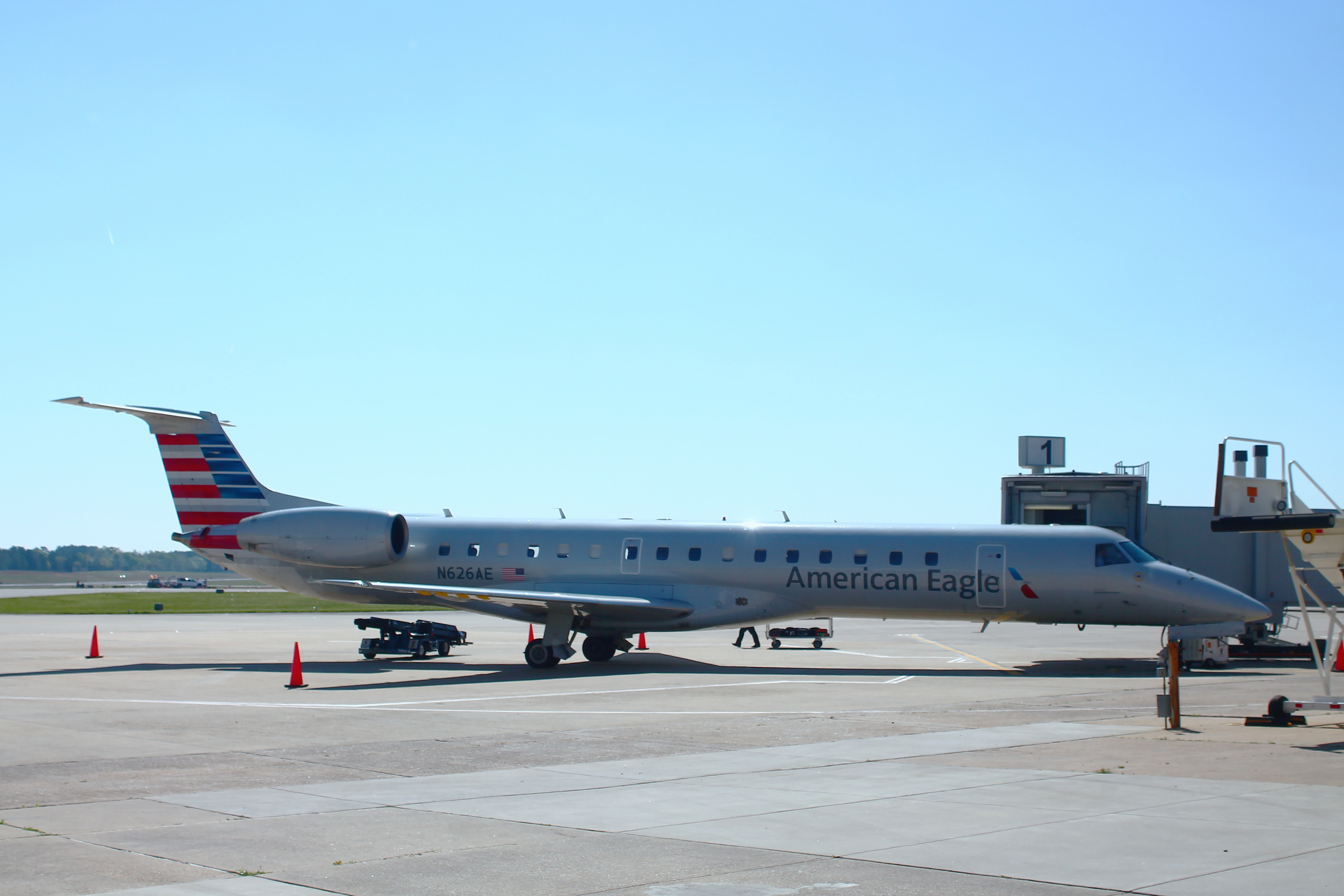
American Eagle plane at East Texas Regional Airport

The Longview metropolitan area is serviced by East Texas Regional Airport.

Amtrak passenger rail service is available on the Texas Eagle through a downtown terminal. Longview's Amtrak station is the fifth-busiest in Texas and the fourth-busiest station along the Texas Eagle route. Daily trains between Chicago and San Antonio stop each morning (Chicago–San Antonio) and each evening (San Antonio–Chicago). Monday, Wednesday, and Friday, the Longview station serves the Chicago to Los Angeles trains.

The return train, Los Angeles to Chicago, stops in Longview on Sunday, Tuesday, and Friday. It serves about 20–50 passengers per day. From the station, passengers can connect to Nacogdoches, Lufkin, Houston, and Galveston, as well as Shreveport, Louisiana, by motorcoach. A proposal is in the works for a high-speed rail system from Dallas/Fort Worth to Shreveport along the I-20 corridor, bringing passenger rail service to that corridor for the first time since the Texas and Pacific's unnamed successor to the Louisiana Eagle in the late 1960s.

Longview is served by Amtrak, the BNSF Railway, and the Union Pacific Railroad.

== See also ==
- List of cities in Texas
- Texas census statistical areas
- List of Texas metropolitan areas
