= White Oak High School (Texas) =

Location
- 200 S. White Oak Rd. White Oak, Texas 75693-1597; United States; 32.53185°N 94.86117°W

Information
- School type: Public high school
- Motto: I Believe
- School district: White Oak Independent School District
- Principal: Skylar Stagner
- Grades: 9-12
- Enrollment: 409 (2016-17)
- Colors: Maroon and white
- Athletics conference: UIL Class 3A
- Mascot: Joe Roughneck
- Nickname: Roughnecks, Ladynecks
- Newspaper: Gauger
- Yearbook: The Roughneck
- Website: White Oak High School

White Oak High School is a public high school located in the city of White Oak, Texas, in Gregg County, United States and classified as a 3A school by the University Interscholastic League (UIL). It is a part of the White Oak Independent School District located in west central Gregg County. In 2015, the school was rated "Met Standard" by the Texas Education Agency.

The school district includes most of White Oak and a portion of Clarksville City.

== Athletics ==
The White Oak Roughnecks compete in:

Volleyball, cross country, football, basketball, powerlifting, swimming, golf, tennis, track, softball and baseball.

=== State titles ===
- Boys Basketball -
  - 1953(B), 1957(B), 2012(2A), 2013(2A)
- Boys Track -
  - 1949(B), 1958(B), 1972(1A),
- Volleyball -
  - 2010(2A)
- UIL Lone Star Cup Champions
  - 2012(2A)
- UIL State Military Marching Contest Champions 2021
- UIL State Military Marching Contest Champions 2024

Notably, the school’s marching band has the most number of state championships in the 3A Military Marching Band Contest.

== Notable alumni ==
- Mike Barber, former NFL player
- Dick Fugler, former NFL player
- Byron Hunt, former NFL player
- Sam Hunt, former NFL player
- Max McGee, former NFL player
- Kelcy Warren, billionaire oil businessman
- Russell Wayt, former NFL player
- Josh Benson, social media influencer and podcast host
