= Dee Mackey =

American football player (1934–2001)

No. 87, 85, 89
- Position: Tight end

Personal information
- Born: October 16, 1934; Gilmer, Texas, U.S.
- Died: February 26, 2001 (aged 66); Gladewater, Texas, U.S.
- Listed height: 6 ft 5 in (1.96 m)
- Listed weight: 235 lb (107 kg)

Career information
- College: East Texas State
- NFL draft: 1958: 24th round, 287th overall pick
- AFL draft: 1960: 2nd round

Career history
- San Francisco 49ers (1960); Baltimore Colts (1961–1962); New York Jets (1963-1965)

Awards and highlights
- East Texas State Hall of Fame, 1984

Career NFL/AFL statistics
- Receptions: 94
- Receiving yards: 1,352
- Touchdowns: 8
- Stats at Pro Football Reference

Dee Elbert Mackey (October 16, 1934 – February 26, 2001) was an American professional football tight end who played six seasons in the National Football League (NFL) and the American Football League (AFL). He played for the NFL's San Francisco 49ers (1960) and the Baltimore Colts (1961–1962). He played for the AFL's New York Jets (1963–1965).

He played college football at East Texas State and was a 24th round selection (287th overall pick) in the 1958 NFL draft.

== Personal ==
Dee Mackey's son Kyle also played football professionally in the NFL and the Arena Football League. Mackey's granddaughter, Molly Mackey, played NCAA Division I softball at the University of Louisiana at Monroe from 2014 to 2015.

Dee Mackey died at his home in Gladewater, Texas of a heart attack.
