= Spring Hill, Gregg County, Texas =

Spring Hill, Texas
- Unincorporated community
- Location within Texas Location within the United States
- Coordinates: 32°33′47″N 94°48′08″W
- Country: United States
- State: Texas
- County: Gregg
- Elevation: 410 ft (120 m)
- Time zone: UTC-6 (Central (CST))
  - Summer (DST): UTC-5 (CDT)
- Area codes: 430 & 903
- GNIS feature ID: 1347736

Spring Hill was an unincorporated community in Gregg County, Texas, United States. Founded sometime before 1900, the town became the site of many oil field camps during the oil boom of the 1930s. Most oil workers would leave by the end of the decade. By 1940, Spring Hill had a population of 140, a consolidated school district, and a number of businesses. By 1984, the population stood at 1,458 due in part to development in nearby Longview. Spring Hill was annexed to Longview on October 7, 1983. Spring Hill still retains its own school district, the Spring Hill Independent School District.
