= Clarksville City, Texas =

- City
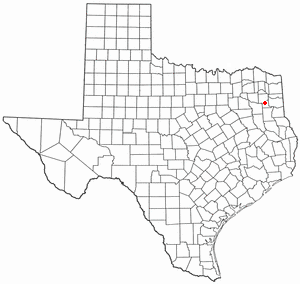
- Location of Clarksville City, Texas

- Coordinates: 32°31′59″N 94°53′40″W
- Country: United States
- State: Texas
- Counties: Gregg, Upshur

Area
  - Total: 6.53 sq mi (16.92 km^{2})
  - Land: 6.37 sq mi (16.50 km^{2})
  - Water: 0.16 sq mi (0.41 km^{2})
- Elevation: 308 ft (94 m)

Population (2020)
  - Total: 780
  - Density: 120/sq mi (47/km^{2})
- Time zone: UTC-6 (Central (CST))
  - Summer (DST): UTC-5 (CDT)
- ZIP code: 75693
- Area codes: 430, 903
- FIPS code: 48-15172
- GNIS feature ID: 2409471
- Website: clarksvilletx.com

Clarksville City is a city in Gregg and Upshur Counties in the U.S. state of Texas. Its population was 780 at the 2020 census.

== History ==
The first settlers arrived in the area before 1845. A stagecoach stop at the home of William W. Walters was later owned and operated by Warren P. Victory. Though first known as "Gilead", the post office was named "Point Pleasant" in 1852. It closed in 1867. The community withered when the railroad bypassed it in 1873, and Gladewater was established. With the advent of the East Texas Oil Field in 1930, so many homes, businesses, and oil-company camps and offices sprang up along the highway that it was called the Main Street of Texas, and street numbers were designated from Longview to Gladewater. The area around George W. Clark's home on the site of the old stagecoach stop became known as "Clarksville".

After extensive paving projects and other civic improvements in the 1940s and the construction of Lake Gladewater in 1952, the nearby city of Gladewater had a high tax rate and was extending its boundaries. Industrialists in the area to the east became alarmed at the prospect of being taken into Gladewater and taxed more. A movement to incorporate, spearheaded by several oil companies and the L. W. Pelphrey Company, a general contractor specializing in oilfield construction, culminated in a vote to establish Clarksville City on September 14, 1956. Pelphrey was elected mayor and served until his death in August 1961. The bypassed portion of Old Highway 80 is named Pelphrey Drive in his honor.

The population dwindled as drilling reached the state allowable and producing wells became automated. Cities Service Oil Company closed its office and camp in the early 1960s, and Sun Oil Company soon followed. After a population low of 359 in the 1960s, growth was steady. In 1990, Clarksville City had 720 residents and twenty businesses. In 2000, its population was 806. The town has an elected mayor and council with a city manager form of government. The city hall was built in 1962 and doubled in size in 1991. A Texas historical marker for the old community of Point Pleasant is at the city hall.

== Geography ==
Clarksville City is located in northwestern Gregg County along U.S. Route 80, 10 miles (16 km) west of Longview and 2.5 miles (4.0 km) east of Gladewater. The city is bordered by Gladewater to the west, Warren City to the northwest, and White Oak to the east. Lake Deverina on Campbell Creek is in the southern part of Clarksville City.

According to the United States Census Bureau, the city has a total area of 6.5 sq mi (16.8 km^{2}), of which 6.3 sq mi (16.4 km^{2}) are land and 0.15 square miles (0.4 km^{2}), or 2.49%, is covered by water.

== Demographics ==
Historical population
Census	Pop.	Note	%±
1960	359		—
1970	398		10.9%
1980	525		31.9%
1990	720		37.1%
2000	806		11.9%
2010	865		7.3%
2020	780		−9.8%
U.S. Decennial Census

=== 2020 census ===
As of the 2020 census, Clarksville City had a population of 780. The median age was 46.9 years. 19.1% of residents were under the age of 18 and 22.8% of residents were 65 years of age or older. For every 100 females there were 114.3 males, and for every 100 females age 18 and over there were 109.6 males age 18 and over.

30.1% of residents lived in urban areas, while 69.9% lived in rural areas.

There were 322 households in Clarksville City, of which 29.5% had children under the age of 18 living in them. Of all households, 51.2% were married-couple households, 19.3% were households with a male householder and no spouse or partner present, and 24.2% were households with a female householder and no spouse or partner present. About 24.2% of all households were made up of individuals and 11.4% had someone living alone who was 65 years of age or older.

There were 359 housing units, of which 10.3% were vacant. Among occupied housing units, 79.5% were owner-occupied and 20.5% were renter-occupied. The homeowner vacancy rate was 1.2% and the rental vacancy rate was 6.6%.

Racial composition as of the 2020 census
Race	Percent
White	85.0%
Black or African American	4.2%
American Indian and Alaska Native	0.9%
Asian	0.3%
Native Hawaiian and Other Pacific Islander	0%
Some other race	3.8%
Two or more races	5.8%
Hispanic or Latino (of any race)	10.3%

=== 2010 census ===
At the census of 2010, 865 people lived in the city. The population density was 127.9 inhabitants per square mile (49.4/km^{2}). The 337 housing units had an average density of 53.5 per square mile (20.7/km^{2}). The racial makeup of the city was 92.56% White, 3.97% African American, 0.25% Native American, 0.62% from other races, and 2.61% from two or more races. Hispanics or Latinos of any race were 1.36% of the population.

== Education ==
Most of Clarksville City is served by the Gladewater Independent School District. A small portion of the town is in the White Oak Independent School District. The portion in Upshur County is within the Union Grove Independent School District.

Areas in Gladewater, White Oak, and Union Grove ISDs are in the service area of Kilgore Junior College.
