= Sexual abuse scandal in the Roman Catholic Archdiocese of Dubuque =

The sexual abuse scandal in Dubuque archdiocese is a major chapter in the series of Catholic sex abuse cases in the United States and Ireland. It took place in the Roman Catholic Archdiocese of Dubuque in the US state of Iowa.

== Cases ==
=== Leo Riley ===
A Dubuque priest called Father Leo Riley was charged in April 2024 with five counts of second-degree sexual abuse against several former altar boys. The claims date from Riley's time as associate pastor of Resurrection Parish in Dubuque from 1984 to 1986. Riley was arrested in Florida, where he had most recently worked at a Catholic Church, and where he also faced a sexual abuse lawsuit. Riley had previously been placed administrative after these abuse allegations starting coming forward by May 2023. However, criminal charges against Riley were dismissed in July 2024 because the statute of limitations had run out. In June 2025, the Archdiocese of Dubuque was dismissed by Charlotte County (Fla.) Circuit Judge Geoffrey H. Gentile as a party to a lawsuit filed by three men who alleged that they were sexually abused by Riley when they served as altar boys at the Dubuque based church where Riley served, due to the Florida-based court’s lack of jurisdiction over the Iowa-based archdiocese, the expiration of the statute of limitations and also due a legal doctrine called “forum non conveniens,” which makes it legal for a court to dismiss a case if another court is deemed more appropriate or convenient to hear a case. Despite this, no ruling was made on Riley's motion to this lawsuit against him. Riley, who served in multiple Archdiocese of Dubuque-run churches from 1982 to 2002 before moving to the Florida-based Diocese of Venice and serving as in multiple churches in that diocese from 2002 until 2023, died in Florida in December 2025 at the age of 69. At the time of his death, Riley was facing a pair of sex abuse lawsuits in two Florida counties. It was soon afterwards revealed in addition to the one lawsuit being based on sex abuse Riley allegedly committed while serving at the Dubuque-based Resurrection Parish, the other of these two Florida lawsuits was for sex abuse Riley allegedly committed during his time in Florida. The lawsuit based in Charlotte County, Florida, related to sex abuse allegations stemming from Dubuque, was set to have its next hearing on March 2, 2026, while the other lawsuit, based in Sarasota County, Florida, was set to begin trial in March 2026.

=== Robert Reiss ===
In 1997, accused Archdiocese of Dubuque "predator priest" Robert Reiss was defrocked by the Vatican. He was later found dead in Mexico in 2005 under mysterious circumstances. It was believed that he was murdered. Following the death of Reiss, then-Archbishop of Dubuque Jerome Hanus called for more sex victims to come forward.

=== William Roach ===
In 2002, a man living in Dallas, Texas, filed a lawsuit against the archdiocese in which he claimed that he had been abused by William Roach in 1962. At the time, Roach worked at Immaculate Conception Catholic Church in Cedar Rapids, Iowa. The man, who was 17 at the time, claimed that Roach and another priest abused him and another young person. Two other men have also claimed to have been abused by Roach, including NBC reporter Jim Cummins, who filed 15 lawsuits over forty years after he had been sexually abused.

Roach worked in parishes in Key West, Waukon, Cascade, and Oxford Junction. He also worked at Holy Family in Peosta, Iowa, and Holy Ghost parish in Dubuque. Roach died in an automobile accident in 1986, and was legally intoxicated at the time of the accident.

=== William Goltz ===
The Rev. William Goltz was accused of abusing minors during the 1950s and showing pornographic pictures to them as well. Goltz was named in three lawsuits. He retired in 1991, and in 1992 Goltz was barred by the Vatican from celebrating Mass or representing himself publicly as a priest. In 2005 the Vatican further ordered him to spend the remainder of his life in prayer and penance. Legal actions against Goltz ended with his death in 2006.

=== Jim Cummins lawsuit ===
Jim Cummins, an NBC reporter, alleged that he was sexually molested by his parish priest, William Roach, when he was a 17-year-old altar boy in 1962. The abuse took place on two occasions, each one accompanied by an additional, different priest. Roach went on to molest at least two more teenage boys and worked for the northeast Iowa Catholic parishes for another 24 years before being killed while driving intoxicated.

The memories caused serious psychological troubles for Cummins including panic attacks, but he continued to suppress them. In 2002 Cummins interviewed the family of a suicide victim and was reminded of his own past. Cummins in June 2004 filed the first of 15 lawsuits which would be brought against the Archdiocese of Dubuque and priests accused of child molestation.

In February 2006, he spoke with Dubuque Archbishop Jerome Hanus about his troubled past and later commended the archbishop for his sincere remorse.

=== Old cases ===
A number of cases of past abuse have also come up—some from as long as 60 years ago. Some new claims have recently been made against a deceased priest; the parishes he served at have been notified of these claims, and the archdiocese has encouraged victims to come forward. The archdiocese released to the media the names and pictures of those priests—both living and deceased—that had been accused or found guilty of sexual abuse. It also gave their current status. On February 21, 2006, the archdiocese announced that it had reached settlements with several victims worth an estimated five million dollars, paid from the archdiocese's self-insurance program.

== Diocesan response ==
The archdiocese has responded to this crisis by creating a policy for protecting minors; it also created a review board for dealing with issues of abuse, and has agreed to pay for counseling for victims. Reaction to these policy changes has been mixed. Some people feel that the archdiocese is not being as cooperative as it could be, and feel that more could be done. At the same time, others feel that the archdiocese is doing what it can in a very difficult situation.

Like many other dioceses, in the past the archdiocese had tried to handle such problems quietly through sending the offender to treatment followed by quiet reassignment. The archdiocese has been accused of being slow to respond to this crisis, and of not doing enough to prevent this from happening. Almost immediately after taking office, Archbishop Hanus was forced to deal with a case of sexual abuse by a Dubuque area priest. Most of these incidents of abuse took place on church property.

=== Settlements by archbishop Hanus ===
Archbishop Jerome Hanus has had to deal with the sexual abuse crisis that has rocked the church in recent times. Soon after he became archbishop, a Dubuque area priest had been found to have abused minors while working at Saint Columbkille's church in Dubuque. In February 2006 he, along with Bishop Charron of Des Moines and Bishop Franklin of Davenport, met with victim's advocate groups. Then on February 21, 2006 the archdiocese settled a number of claims, and the Archbishop offered a personal apology.
