= Grace Noll Crowell =

American writer

- Grace Noll Crowell
- Born: Grace Noll Crowell; October 31, 1877 Inland Township, Cedar County; Iowa, US
- Died: March 31, 1969 (aged 91)
- Resting place: Sparkman-Hillcrest Memorial Park Cemetery in Dallas, Texas
- Occupation: Poet
- Spouse: Norman H. Crowell

Grace Noll Crowell (October 31, 1877 - March 31, 1969) was an American poet, author of 36 books of inspirational verse and approximately 5,000 poems. Her work has appeared in hundreds of magazines and newspapers.

== Early life, education, and family ==
Crowell was born Grace Noll in Inland Township in Cedar County, Iowa, to Adam and Sarah Noll. She was educated at the German-English college in Wilton, Iowa, and received her B.A. in 1901. That same year, she married Norman H. Crowell, with whom she had three sons, Dean, Reid, and Norton. Crowell and her husband moved to Farmington, Minnesota, where he worked as a bank teller. In 1917 Crowell and her family moved to Texas, first to Wichita Falls, and then to Dallas, where she lived until her death.

== Poetry ==
Crowell first attempted writing poetry at the age of 8, but found that her family mocked her efforts as infantile. She stated, "I never tried to write after that until love and romance and a home came to me. That quickened and awakened the desire to write poetry again."

In 1906 after the birth of her first child she fell gravely ill, and was immobile. During this time she began to write poetry again, and her first poem, "The Marshland", was written and published while she was recovering from her illness. Crowell said that it was primarily her long confinement and suffering in various hospitals that led her to write verses of hope, patience, and inspiration; she stated, "The thought kept coming to me, 'I would like to write poetry that will help others who are suffering as I am.'" She continued to write, and many of her works were subsequently published in popular periodicals.

Her first full book of poetry White Fire, which was published in 1925, received first prize from the Texas Poetry Society. In 1935 she was appointed Poet Laureate of Texas, a position she held for three years. She was awarded the Golden Scroll Medal of Honor as National Honor Poet in 1938. That same year she was designated American Mother of the Year by the Golden Rule Foundation, and American Woman, a biographical publication, selected her as one of the ten Outstanding American Women. Baylor University awarded her an honorary doctorate degree in 1940.

As Crowell gained in popularity, her husband left his previous career to manage her writing career full-time. She received large amounts of correspondence from readers of all ages and backgrounds, and he took it upon himself to sort through this large volume of communication that she was receiving on a daily basis.

Crowell wrote over 35 books of poetry, as well as stories for children and religious devotionals. Lee Mero illustrated several of her children’s books. Her Songs for Courage went into twenty-five printings. She continued writing until she was 86 years old. God's Masterpieces, a devotional book was her last published work before her death.

Her poetry came back into the public eye during the COVID pandemic, with 14 of her works having been published as e-books on two leading sites.

== Death and legacy ==
Crowell died on March 31, 1969, at age 91, and is buried at Hillcrest Memorial Park Cemetery, in Dallas, Texas.

Let the Sun Shine In was published posthumously in 1970. In 1977 a reprint of her 1965 collection of poems appeared as The Eternal Things: The Best of Grace Noll Crowell.

Although time has relegated her to the status of a minor poet, she was selected by the America Publishers as one of the ten outstanding American Women of 1938, and in the early 1940s she was called "the most popular writer of verse in America".

Her poem "Because of Thy Great Bounty" has appeared in 16 hymnals under the title "Because I Have Been Given Much" starting in 1937, the year after the poem was first published. In 1974 Philip Landgrave composed a tune for the poem that first appeared in the Baptist Hymnal (1975 ed) and has since been used in several hymnals.
