= Dick Fugler =

American football player (1931–2003)

No. 75
- Positions: Offensive tackle, defensive tackle

Personal information
- Born: July 19, 1931; Dallas, Texas, U.S.
- Died: January 22, 2003 (aged 71); Destin, Florida, U.S.
- Listed height: 6 ft 2 in (1.88 m)
- Listed weight: 238 lb (108 kg)

Career information
- High school: White Oak (White Oak, Texas)
- College: Tulane
- NFL draft: 1952: 5th round, 51st overall pick

Career history
- Hamilton Tiger-Cats (1952); Pittsburgh Steelers (1952); Chicago Cardinals (1954)

Career NFL statistics
- Games played: 24
- Games started: 3
- Fumble recoveries: 1
- Stats at Pro Football Reference

Richard Guy Fugler (July 19, 1931 – January 22, 2003) was an American professional football player who played offensive lineman for two seasons for the Chicago Cardinals and Pittsburgh Steelers. He died on January 22, 2003, at the age of 71.
