= Russell Wayt =

American football player (1942–2020)

No. 33
- Position: Linebacker

Personal information
- Born: October 6, 1942; Oklahoma City, Oklahoma, U.S.
- Died: January 10, 2020 (aged 77); White Oak, Texas, U.S.
- Listed height: 6 ft 4 in (1.93 m)
- Listed weight: 235 lb (107 kg)

Career information
- High school: White Oak (TX)
- College: Rice
- NFL draft: 1965: 8th round, 103rd overall pick
- AFL draft: 1965: 6th round, 43rd overall pick

Career history
- Dallas Cowboys (1965)

Awards and highlights
- Second-team All-SWC (1963)

Career NFL statistics
- Games played: 9
- Stats at Pro Football Reference

Russell Gene Wayt (October 6, 1942–January 10, 2020) was an American professional football linebacker in the National Football League (NFL) for the Dallas Cowboys. He played college football at Rice University.

== Early life ==
Wayt attended White Oak High School. He accepted a football scholarship from Rice University. He was a two-way player at fullback and linebacker. As a sophomore, he was second on the team with 70 carries for 277 yards (4-yard avg.).

As a junior, he was third on the team with 43 carries for 161 yards (3.7-yard avg.) and one touchdown. As a senior, he posted 13 carries for 105 yards (fourth on the team), a 8.1-yard average (led the team) and one touchdown.

== Professional career ==
Wayt was selected by the Dallas Cowboys in the eighth round (103rd overall) of the 1965 NFL draft. He also was selected by the Houston Oilers in the sixth round (43rd overall) of the 1965 AFL draft. On November 31, 1964, he opted to sign with the Cowboys.

As a rookie in training camp, he was moved to tight end. During the season he was switched to linebacker. He was released before the start of the 1966 season.
