= Warren City, Texas =

- City
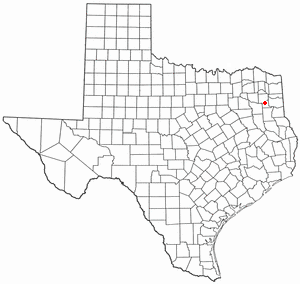
- Location of Warren City, Texas

- Coordinates: 32°33′11″N 94°54′20″W
- Country: United States
- State: Texas
- Counties: Gregg, Upshur

Area
  - Total: 1.75 sq mi (4.53 km^{2})
  - Land: 1.75 sq mi (4.53 km^{2})
  - Water: 0 sq mi (0.00 km^{2})
- Elevation: 387 ft (118 m)

Population (2020)
  - Total: 319
  - Density: 182/sq mi (70.4/km^{2})
- Time zone: UTC-6 (Central (CST))
  - Summer (DST): UTC-5 (CDT)
- Area codes: 903, 430
- FIPS code: 48-76576
- GNIS feature ID: 2412183

Warren City is a city in Gregg and Upshur counties in the U.S. state of Texas. The population was 319 at the 2020 U.S. census.

== Geography ==
Warren City is located near the northern border of Gregg County. The city limits extend north into Upshur County. It is bordered to the west by Gladewater and to the south and east by Clarksville City. It is 4 miles (6 km) northeast of the center of Gladewater and 12 miles (19 km) northwest of Longview. It is in the area of the East Texas Oil Field.

According to the United States Census Bureau, Warren City has a total area of 1.8 square miles (4.6 km^{2}), all land.

== Demographics ==
=== 2020 census ===
As of the 2020 census, Warren City had a population of 319 and remained predominantly non-Hispanic white. The median age was 36.4 years. 29.2% of residents were under the age of 18 and 14.7% of residents were 65 years of age or older. For every 100 females there were 93.3 males, and for every 100 females age 18 and over there were 85.2 males age 18 and over.

50.5% of residents lived in urban areas, while 49.5% lived in rural areas.

There were 125 households in Warren City, of which 39.2% had children under the age of 18 living in them. Of all households, 48.8% were married-couple households, 18.4% were households with a male householder and no spouse or partner present, and 27.2% were households with a female householder and no spouse or partner present. About 26.4% of all households were made up of individuals and 15.2% had someone living alone who was 65 years of age or older.

There were 131 housing units, of which 4.6% were vacant. The homeowner vacancy rate was 1.0% and the rental vacancy rate was 7.4%.

Racial composition as of the 2020 census
Race	Number	Percent
White	259	81.2%
Black or African American	33	10.3%
American Indian and Alaska Native	0	0.0%
Asian	1	0.3%
Native Hawaiian and Other Pacific Islander	0	0.0%
Some other race	10	3.1%
Two or more races	16	5.0%
Hispanic or Latino (of any race)	31	9.7%

=== 2020 American Community Survey ===
In 2020, the American Community Survey estimated the median income increased to $61,250 with a mean income of $65,208.

=== 2000 census ===
According to the census of 2000, there were 343 people, 119 households, and 98 families residing in the city. The population density was 194.0 inhabitants per square mile (74.9/km^{2}). There were 124 housing units at an average density of 70.1 per square mile (27.1/km^{2}). The racial makeup of the city was 89.50% White, 7.87% African American, and 2.62% from two or more races. Hispanic or Latino of any race were 3.21% of the population.

In 2000, there were 119 households, out of which 37.8% had children under the age of 18 living with them, 67.2% were married couples living together, 10.9% had a female householder with no husband present, and 17.6% were non-families. 14.3% of all households were made up of individuals, and 10.1% had someone living alone who was 65 years of age or older. The average household size was 2.88 and the average family size was 3.20. In the city, the population was spread out, with 29.4% under the age of 18, 7.0% from 18 to 24, 25.9% from 25 to 44, 26.5% from 45 to 64, and 11.1% who were 65 years of age or older. The median age was 35 years. For every 100 females, there were 86.4 males. For every 100 females age 18 and over, there were 90.6 males.

The median income for a household in the city was $34,028, and the median income for a family was $37,500 in 2000. Males had a median income of $22,639 versus $24,750 for females. The per capita income for the city was $13,066. About 10.9% of families and 14.0% of the population were below the poverty line, including 16.3% of those under age 18 and 8.9% of those age 65 or over.

== Education ==
All of Warren City in Gregg County is served by the Gladewater Independent School District. A section of the Upshur County portion is also in Gladewater ISD, while a portion is within the Union Grove Independent School District.

Areas in Gladewater and Union Grove ISDs are in the service area of Kilgore Junior College.
