= Tony Jeffery =

American football player (born 1964)

No. 28, 27
- Position: Running back

Personal information
- Born: July 8, 1964 (age 62); Gladewater, Texas, U.S.
- Listed height: 5 ft 11 in (1.80 m)
- Listed weight: 208 lb (94 kg)

Career information
- High school: Gladewater
- College: TCU (1984–1987)
- NFL draft: 1988: 2nd round, 38th overall pick

Career history
- Phoenix Cardinals (1988); San Francisco 49ers (1990)*; New York/New Jersey Knights (1991)
- * Offseason or practice squad member only

Awards and highlights
- Second-team All-SWC (1987)

Career NFL statistics
- Rushing yards: 8
- Rushing average: 2.7
- Return yards: 11
- Stats at Pro Football Reference

Tony Loranzo Jeffery (born July 9, 1964) is an American former professional football player who was a running back for one season with the Phoenix Cardinals of the National Football League (NFL). He was selected by the Cardinals in the second round of the 1988 NFL draft after playing college football for the TCU Horned Frogs. Jeffery was also a member of the New York/New Jersey Knights of the World League of American Football.

== Early life and college ==
Tony Loranzo Jeffery was born on July 9, 1964, in Gladewater, Texas. He attended Gladewater High School in Gladewater.

Jeffery was a four-year letterman for the TCU Horned Frogs of Texas Christian University from 1984 to 1987. He rushed 165 times for 840 yards and nine touchdowns as a freshman in 1984 while also catching six passes for 39 yards and returning four kicks for 81 yards. In 1985, he recorded 176 carries for 695 yards and four touchdowns, and 17 receptions for 229 yards and one touchdown. As a junior in 1986, Jeffery totaled 122 rushing attempts for 861 yards and eight touchdowns, and 11 catches for 112 yards and one touchdown. His 7.1 yards per attempt was the highest in the Southwest Conference (SWC) that season. He rushed 202 times for 1,353 yards and ten touchdowns his senior year in 1987 while catching 17 passes for 257 yards and one touchdown, earning Associated Press second-team All-SWC honors. Jeffery's 1,353 rushing yards led the SWC that year. His 3,749 career rushing yards were the second most in TCU history at the time. He was inducted into the school's athletics hall of fame in 2019.

== Professional career ==
Jeffery was selected by the Phoenix Cardinals in the second round, with the 38th overall pick, of the 1988 NFL draft. He officially signed with the team on July 11, 1988. He played in three games for the Cardinals during the 1988 season, rushing three times for eight yards and returning one kick for 11 yards. Jeffery was released on September 5, 1989.

Jeffery signed with the San Francisco 49ers on May 4, 1990. He was released on August 27, 1990.

Jeffery played in all ten games for the New York/New Jersey Knights of the World League of American Football in 1991, totaling 16 carries for 72 yards and two touchdowns and four receptions for 60 yards.
