= Union Grove Independent School District =

School district in Texas

Location
- Union Grove, Texas United States

District information
- Type: Public School
- Grades: PK-12
- Superintendent: Dr. Greg Bower

Students and staff
- Athletic conference: UIL Class 2A
- Colors: Columbia Blue, Grey, and White

Union Grove Independent School District is a public school district based in Union Grove, Texas (USA). In addition to Union Grove, the district also serves small portions of nearby Gladewater, Warren City, Clarksville City, and East Mountain.

The school's athletic teams are known as the Lions.

In 2009, the school district was rated "recognized" by the Texas Education Agency.

== Schools ==
Union Grove ISD operates two schools:

- Union Grove Jr/Sr High School (Grades 6-12)
- Union Grove Elementary (Grades PK-5)

== History ==
The earliest recorded school in the southern Upshur County, Texas, area was held at the home of pioneer settler, John O'Byrne, a former banker from Alabama. In 1888, a public school opened with JH Sheppard as teacher. The first half of the 20th century saw much growth for the Union Grove School, with the creation of the Union Grove Common School District, No. 42 in 1907. In 1909, 1920, and 1933, new buildings were constructed on the current site of the UG Elementary School. The 1930s oil boom greatly increased the tax base and population of the Union Grove community, with students coming in from nearby Gladewater, Texas, and Gilmer, Texas. Over the years, the UG School has expanded to include elementary and junior-senior high campuses, an auditorium, cafeteria, library, shop buildings, and in 1996, a new football stadium located at the high school. In 1965, Union Grove became a Texas Independent School District (ISD).

== Lion Pride ==
Union Grove is known for its marching band program, under the helm of Mark Melton. Since 1988, Mr. Melton has made the band from a 12-member ensemble (as it was at the time) into an 80-something-member marching force. "Upshur County's Finest" has blown away the competition at many marching contests including the East Texas Yamboree marching contest in Gilmer, Texas, every October and the University Interscholastic League State Marching Contest, in which Union Grove has marched in three times, the most recent being the 2009 AA State Contest, in which Union Grove placed 8th, coming in behind the Regiment of Roughnecks Band from the neighboring White Oak Independent School District of White Oak, Texas by judges preference. This marked a special feat for both White Oak and Union Grove, being the only two military style marching bands at the state contest. In May, 2011, Mr. Melton announced he was leaving "the Grove" to take over as head band director at the much larger Pine Tree Independent School District in Longview, Texas, in August 2011. The current band director is Brandon Garmon who came from Gilmer's band program during the 2013-2014 school year.

Union Grove is also known for its agriculture and shop programs. With Mr. Garry T. Boyd as ag director at Union Grove since the early-1970s, the ag program has grown to be one of the best in the entire state of Texas.

== Other Accomplishments ==
The 2011 Senior Class of Union Grove High School totaled 45 students, one of the smallest classes to graduate in years.
