= Seven Pines =

Seven Pines may refer to the following places in the United States:

- Seven Pines, Virginia, in Henrico County, location of a Civil War battle and cemetery
  - Battle of Seven Pines
  - Seven Pines National Cemetery
- Seven Pines, Mississippi, in Carroll County (33°22'13"N 90°5'41"W)
- Seven Pines, Pennsylvania, in Juniata County; (40°28'11"N 77°27'45"W)
- Seven Pines, Texas, in Gregg County
- Seven Pines, West Virginia, in Marion County
