= Spring Hill High School (Texas) =

Location
- 3101 Spring Hill Road; Longview, Texas 75605-2822; United States; 32.564517°N 94.795306°W

Information
- School type: Public high school
- School district: Spring Hill Independent School District
- Grades: 9-12
- Enrollment: 611 (2023-2024)
- Campus: Suburban
- Colors: Blue & White
- Athletics conference: UIL Class AAAA
- Mascot: Panther
- Yearbook: The Panther
- Website: hs.shisd.net

Spring Hill High School is a public high school located in the city of Longview, Texas, in Gregg County, United States and classified as a 4A school by the University Interscholastic League (UIL). It is a part of the Spring Hill Independent School District located northwest of the city of Longview. In 2013, the school was rated "Met Standard" by the Texas Education Agency.

== Athletics ==
The Spring Hill Panthers compete in these sports:

- Baseball
- Basketball
- Cross Country
- Football
- Golf
- Powerlifting
- Soccer
- Softball
- Tennis
- Track and Field
- Volleyball

=== State Titles ===
- Baseball
  - 2025 (4A/D2)
- Boys Track
  - 1962 (B)

== Notable alumni ==
- Brandon Carter, former NFL player
- David Sullivan, actor
