= Alpine, Gregg County, Texas =

Ghost town in Texas, US

Alpine
- Ghost town
- Location in Texas
- Coordinates: 32°33′17″N 94°42′48″W
- Country: United States
- State: Texas
- County: Gregg

Alpine is a ghost town in Gregg County, Texas, United States. It began in the 19th century, as the Alpine Presbyterian Church, its namesake. It peaked in the 1960s, and was abandoned by the 1990s.
