= Awalt, Texas =

Ghost town in Texas, US

Awalt is a ghost town in Gregg County, Texas, United States. Situated near the Sabine River, it was established in the late 1840s. The communitt was named for local pastor Solomon Awalt. Awalt's Ferry operated in the town during the American Civil War. In 1873, the Texas and Pacific Railway was built through Gregg County but bypassed Awalt, which caused its abandonment by 1900.
