= Molly Mackey =

American softball player and coach

Current position
- Title: Head coach
- Team: Union Grove HS
- Conference: UIL Class 2A
- Record: 22–10

Biographical details
- Born: December 3, 1992 (age 33); West Monroe, Louisiana, U.S.
- Education: University of Louisiana at Monroe

Playing career
- 2012: Angelina CC
- 2013: Kilgore CC
- 2014–2015: Louisiana–Monroe
- Position: First baseman / Designated player

Coaching career (HC unless noted)
- 2016: Galveston CC (assistant)
- 2017: LeTourneau (assistant)
- 2018–2020: Sabine HS
- 2021–present: Union Grove HS

Head coaching record
- Overall: 40–41–1 (high school softball); 12–16 (high school volleyball)

Accomplishments and honors

Awards
- 19-AA All District Coach of the Year (2021)

Molly Kathryn Mackey (born December 3, 1992) is an American softball player and coach.

== Career ==
Mackey attended Overton High School in Overton, Texas. She later attended Angelina College and Kilgore College, before transferring to the University of Louisiana at Monroe, where she played first base and designated player for the Louisiana–Monroe Warhawks softball team. After graduating from Louisiana–Monroe, Mackey served as an assistant softball coach at Galveston College and LeTourneau University, before being named head softball coach at Sabine High School in Liberty City, Texas on June 14, 2017. Mackey was named head softball and volleyball coach at Union Grove High School in Union Grove, Texas on June 1, 2020.

== Head coaching record ==
=== Softball ===
Record table
Season	Team	Overall	Conference	Standing	Postseason
Sabine Lady Cardinals (UIL Class 3A) (2018–2020)
2018	Sabine	13–8	7–2		
2019	Sabine	4–15–1	0–9		
2020	Sabine	1–8	0–2		
Sabine:		18–31–1	7–13		
Union Grove Lions (UIL Class 2A) (2021–Present)
2021	Union Grove	22–10	11–0		
Union Grove:		22–10	11–0		
Total:		40–41–1			
National champion Postseason invitational champion Conference regular season champion Conference regular season and conference tournament champion Division regular season champion Division regular season and conference tournament champion Conference tournament champion

=== Volleyball ===
Record table
Season	Team	Overall	Conference	Standing	Postseason
Union Grove Lions (UIL Class 2A) (2020–Present)
2020	Union Grove	12–16	8–4		
Union Grove:		12–16	8–4		
Total:		12–16			
National champion Postseason invitational champion Conference regular season champion Conference regular season and conference tournament champion Division regular season champion Division regular season and conference tournament champion Conference tournament champion

Sporting positions
Preceded by Donne Cline	Sabine HS Head Softball Coach; 2018 – 2020	Succeeded by Brian Martin
Preceded by Jaime Scott	Union Grove HS Head Softball Coach; 2021 – present	Succeeded by Incumbent
Preceded by Barry Woodruff	Union Grove HS Head Volleyball Coach; 2020 – present	Succeeded by Incumbent
