= Mike Gunter =

American football player (born 1961)

No. 38
- Position: Running back

Personal information
- Born: February 18, 1961 (age 65); Gladewater, Texas, U.S.
- Listed height: 5 ft 11 in (1.80 m)
- Listed weight: 205 lb (93 kg)

Career information
- High school: Gladewater (Texas)
- College: Tulsa (1980–1983)
- NFL draft: 1984: 4th round, 107th overall pick

Career history
- Tampa Bay Buccaneers (1984)*; Indianapolis Colts (1984)*; Kansas City Chiefs (1984)
- * Offseason or practice squad member only

Awards and highlights
- 2× First-team All-MVC (1982–1983); MVC Offensive Player of the Year (1983)

Career NFL statistics
- Rushing yards: 12
- Rushing average: 0.8
- Stats at Pro Football Reference

Michael Wayne Gunter (born February 18, 1961) is an American former professional football player who was a running back for one season with the Kansas City Chiefs of the National Football League (NFL). He was selected by the Tampa Bay Buccaneers in the fourth round of the 1984 NFL draft. He played college football for the Tulsa Golden Hurricane.

== Early life and college ==
Michael Wayne Gunter was born on February 18, 1961, in Gladewater, Texas, to parents Maurice and Mary (Smith) Gunter. He attended Gladewater High School.

He played college football for the Hurricane at Tulsa University from 1980 to 1983. In 1982, he set the school single-season rushing yards record with 1,464 yards and also led the country with 7.5 yards per carry, earning first-team All-Missouri Valley Conference (MVC) honors. In 1983, he rushed for 1,198 yards and 14 touchdowns, garnering first-team All-MVC and MVC Offensive Player of the Year recognition. Gunter recorded 3,547 yards, 6.2 yards per carry and 32 touchdowns in his college career. His 3,547 rushing yards set the school's all-time record. He was inducted into the Tulsa Golden Hurricane Hall of Fame in 1996.

== Professional career ==
Gunter was selected by the Tampa Bay Buccaneers in the fourth round, with the 107th overall pick, of the 1984 NFL draft. He officially signed with the team on May 25. He was waived on August 20, 1984.

Gunter was claimed off waivers by the Indianapolis Colts on August 21, 1984. He was waived on August 27, 1984.

Gunter signed with the Kansas City Chiefs on October 16, 1984. He played in four games for the Chiefs during the 1984 season, rushing 15 times for 12 yards. He was released on August 12, 1985.

== See also ==
- List of NCAA major college football yearly rushing leaders
