= Monty Montgomery (American football) =

American football player (born 1973)

No. 34, 24, 25
- Position: Cornerback

Personal information
- Born: December 8, 1973 (age 52); Gladewater, Texas, U.S.
- Listed height: 5 ft 11 in (1.80 m)
- Listed weight: 197 lb (89 kg)

Career information
- High school: Gladewater
- College: Houston
- NFL draft: 1997: 4th round, 117th overall pick

Career history
- Indianapolis Colts (1997–1999); San Francisco 49ers (1999–2000); Philadelphia Eagles (2001); New Orleans VooDoo (2004); New Orleans Saints (2004); New Orleans VooDoo (2005); Nashville Kats (2006–2007); Austin Wranglers (2007); New York Dragons (2008); Kansas City Brigade (2008)

Career NFL statistics
- Total tackles: 72
- Sacks: 3.5
- Forced fumbles: 1
- Fumble recoveries: 2
- Interceptions: 4
- Defensive touchdowns: 1
- Stats at Pro Football Reference

Career AFL statistics
- Total tackles: 254
- Sacks: 1
- Interceptions: 17
- Stats at ArenaFan.com

Delmonico Lamont "Monty" Montgomery (born December 8, 1973) is an American former professional football player who was a cornerback in the National Football League (NFL). He played college football for the Houston Cougars and was selected in the fourth round of the 1997 NFL draft with the 117th overall pick. He played six seasons for the Indianapolis Colts (1997–1999), San Francisco 49ers (1999–2000), Philadelphia Eagles (2001), and New Orleans Saints (2004).
