= Agistha, Texas =

Ghost town in Texas, US

Agistha is a ghost town in Gregg County, Texas, United States. Settled in the 1890s, a post office operated from 1899 to 1901. It was abandoned by the early 1920s.
