= Max McGee =

American football player (1932–2007)

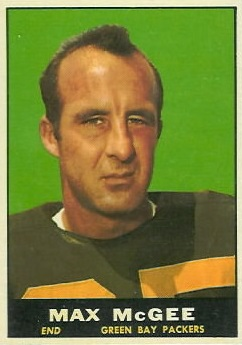
- McGee c. 1961

No. 85
- Positions: End, Punter

Personal information
- Born: July 16, 1932; Saxon City, Nevada, U.S.
- Died: October 20, 2007 (aged 75); Deephaven, Minnesota, U.S.
- Listed height: 6 ft 3 in (1.91 m)
- Listed weight: 205 lb (93 kg)

Career information
- High school: White Oak (White Oak, Texas)
- College: Tulane (1950–1953)
- NFL draft: 1954: 5th round, 51st overall pick

Career history
- Green Bay Packers (1954; 1957–1967)

Awards and highlights
- 5× NFL champion (1961, 1962, 1965–1967); 2× Super Bowl champion (I, II); Pro Bowl (1961); 2× NFL punting yards leader (1954, 1959); Green Bay Packers Hall of Fame; Third-team All-SEC (1952); Louisiana Sports Hall of Fame

Career NFL statistics
- Receptions: 345
- Receiving yards: 6,346
- Receiving touchdowns: 50
- Punts: 256
- Punting yards: 10,647
- Punting average: 41.6
- Longest punt: 63
- Stats at Pro Football Reference

William Max McGee (July 16, 1932 – October 20, 2007) was an American professional football player who was an end and punter for the Green Bay Packers of the National Football League (NFL) from 1954 to 1967. He is best known for his seven receptions for 138 yards and two touchdowns, scoring the now historic initial touchdown, in the first Super Bowl.

== Early life ==
McGee played high school football in White Oak, Texas, and was the very first player in American high school football history ever to rush for over 3,000 yards in a single season. He rushed for 3,048 his senior year as a White Oak Roughneck player in 1949.

McGee played college football at Tulane University in New Orleans, where he was a fullback and a top punter. At the time, Tulane was a member of the Southeastern Conference.

== Professional career ==
McGee was selected in the fifth round (51st overall) of the 1954 NFL draft by the Green Bay Packers. He was the punter during the first few years of his career. In his rookie season in 1954, McGee led the NFL in punting yards while catching 36 passes for 614 yards and nine touchdowns. He missed the next two seasons (1955 and 1956) while serving as a pilot in the U.S. Air Force, then returned to become the Packers' leading receiver from 1958 to 1962. McGee was one of the few bright spots on the 1958 team, which finished the season with a league-low 1–10–1 record, the worst in Packers history. During 1958, he led the NFL in yards per catch average (23.2), punting yards (2,716), and net yards average (36.0).

After Vince Lombardi took over as head coach in January 1959, McGee may be best known for his performance during the first Super Bowl game. He helped the team to six NFL championship appearances, five NFL championship wins, and two Super Bowl titles during the remaining years of his career. He was a Pro Bowl selection during the 1961 season.

Despite reductions in playing time due to injuries and age, McGee's final two seasons were the ones for which his career is best remembered. In the 1966 season at age 34, McGee caught only four passes for 91 yards and a touchdown as the Packers recorded a 12–2 record, won the NFL Championship Game, and advanced to Super Bowl I against the Kansas City Chiefs. McGee did not expect to play in the game, and he violated the Packers' curfew policy and spent the night before the Super Bowl out on the town (with teammate and best friend Paul Hornung). The next morning, he told starting receiver Boyd Dowler, "I hope you don't get hurt. I'm not in very good shape," alluding to his hangover (however, Dave Hanner, an assistant coach with the team at the time, stated in 2002 that McGee did not in fact get out of his bed the night before the Super Bowl, as anybody trying to be out past curfew would've been fined and kicked off the team). Dowler went down with a separated shoulder on the Packers' second drive of the game, and McGee, who had to borrow a teammate's helmet because he had not brought his own out of the locker room, was put into the game. A few plays later, McGee made a one-handed reception of a pass from Bart Starr, took off past Chiefs defender Fred Williamson, and ran 37 yards to score the first touchdown in Super Bowl history. This was a repeat of his performance in the NFL championship game two weeks earlier, when he had also caught a touchdown pass after relieving an injured Dowler. By the end of the game, McGee had recorded seven receptions for 138 yards and two touchdowns, in a 35–10 Packers' victory.

The following year, he recorded a 35-yard reception in the third quarter of Super Bowl II that set up a touchdown in the Packers' 33–14 win over the Oakland Raiders. McGee retired shortly after the game and finished his 12-season career with 345 receptions for 6,346 yards and 12 carries for 121 yards. He scored 51 touchdowns (50 receiving and one fumble recovery). On special teams, he punted 256 times for 10,647 yards, an average of 41.6 yards per punt, and returned four kickoffs for 69 yards.

== Career as a celebrity restaurateur ==
McGee entered into a restaurant partnership with Packers left guard Fuzzy Thurston; they operated the Left Guard Charcoal Houses in Appleton, Fond du Lac, Madison, Green Bay, and Eau Claire. They also operated the Left Guard Steak Houses in Menasha, Milwaukee, and Minneapolis–St. Paul, and the Left End Steak House in Manitowoc. In addition, McGee co-founded the Mexican restaurant chain Chi-Chi's.

== Life after the NFL ==
After retiring from football, McGee became a major partner in developing the popular Chi-Chi's chain of Mexican restaurants with restaurateur Marno McDermott.

McGee was inducted into the Green Bay Packers Hall of Fame in 1975. His ties to the Packers continued from 1979 to 1998 when he served as the color commentator for radio broadcasts of Packers' football games. With droll wit and keen insights, McGee was extremely popular as a color commentator.

McGee founded the Max McGee National Research Center for Juvenile Diabetes in 1999 at the Children's Hospital of Wisconsin and raised a great deal of money for diabetes research.

=== Cancer ===
McGee was diagnosed with colon cancer at age 56 in April 1989, but it was caught early and he recovered after surgery.

=== Death ===
In 2007, at the age of 75, McGee died after a fall off the roof of his home in Minnetonka Beach, Minnesota, a suburb west of Minneapolis. His wife said he had been suffering from an early form of Alzheimer's disease for the previous five years.

== NFL career statistics ==
Legend
	Won the NFL championship
	Super Bowl champion
	Led the league
**Bold**	Career high

=== Regular season ===
Year	Team	Games		Receiving				
Year	Team	GP	GS	Rec	Yds	Avg	Lng	TD
1954	GB	12	12	36	614	17.1	**82**	**9**
1957	GB	12	9	17	273	16.1	49	1
1958	GB	12	12	37	655	17.7	80	7
1959	GB	12	12	30	695	**23.2**	81	5
1960	GB	12	12	38	787	20.7	57	4
1961	GB	13	13	**51**	**883**	17.3	53	7
1962	GB	**14**	**14**	49	820	16.7	64	3
1963	GB	**14**	**14**	39	749	19.2	64	6
1964	GB	13	12	31	592	19.1	55	6
1965	GB	12	1	10	154	15.4	37	1
1966	GB	12	0	4	91	22.8	39	1
1967	GB	10	0	3	33	11.0	13	0
Career		148	111	345	6,346	18.4	82	50

== See also ==
- List of NCAA major college yearly punt and kickoff return leaders
