= Kelcy Warren =

American businessman (born 1955)

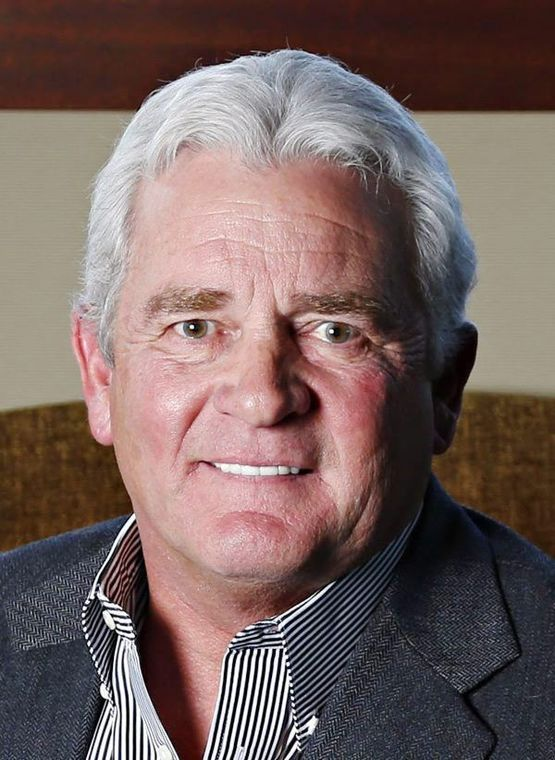
- Warren in 2017
- Born: Kelcy Lee Warren; November 5, 1955 (age 70); Gladewater, Texas, US
- Education: White Oak High School
- Alma mater: University of Texas at Arlington
- Occupations: Chairman & CEO of Energy Transfer Partners

Kelcy Lee Warren (born November 9, 1955) is an American billionaire and the chairman and chief executive officer of Energy Transfer Partners.

== Early life ==
Born in Gladewater, Texas, Warren grew up in White Oak, Texas, the youngest of four sons of Hugh Brinson Warren and Bertie Lee Kirby. His father worked as a field hand for Sun Pipeline, a company now owned by Warren. Warren went to White Oak High School.

He received a bachelor's degree in civil engineering from the University of Texas at Arlington in 1978.

== Career ==
He started his career working for the Lone Star Gas Company. From 1981 to 1992, he worked for Endevco. He served as executive vice-president Cornerstone Natural Gas from 1989 to 1990, and as president and CEO from 1993 to 1996. He has been the co-chairman and co-CEO of Energy Transfer Partners since 2007. He also serves as member of the management council of ETP Enogex Partners LLC, co-CEO of ETC OLP, co-CEO and co-chairman of La Grange Energy and of US Propane LLC. He is a former co-chairman of Le Gp, OEC Compression.

From 1996 to 2000, he sat on the board of directors of Crosstex Energy. He serves on the advisory board of his alma mater, the University of Texas at Arlington.

In 2007, he bought the bankrupt Lajitas Resorts in Lajitas, Texas, as a real estate investment.

Warren purchased the Roatan Electric Company (RECO) in 2008, where he serves as president and chairman of the board. RECO invested $7 million on a wind farm that was scheduled for completion in 2017.

Warren is chief executive officer and chairman of Energy Transfer Partners. Warren also serves as chairman of the general partner of Energy Transfer Equity. Prior to the combination of the operations of ETP and Heritage Propane in 2004, Warren co-founded the entities that acquired and operated the midstream natural gas pipelines that were contributed in the merger. From 1996 to 2000, Warren served as a director of Crosstex Energy, Inc. and from 1993 to 1996, he served as president, chief operating officer and a director of Cornerstone Natural Gas, Inc. Warren has more than 25 years of business experience in the energy industry.

In 2015, Governor Greg Abbott of Texas appointed Warren to the Texas Parks and Wildlife Commission.

In 2020, Warren received a COVID stimulus check as he had reported large losses previously.

In 2022, he ranked No. 289 on the Forbes 400 list of the richest people in America, with an estimated net worth of $3.8 billion. As of September 2024, his net worth over $7 billion.

== Music ==
In 2007, he co-founded an independent record label, Music Road Records, with Jimmy LaFave and Fred Remmert. He collects music memorabilia, and has a collection that includes autographs of Jackson Browne and drumsticks signed by the Eagles.

== Philanthropy ==
In 2020, Forbes gave Warren its lowest score for philanthropy, a "1." This indicates he was in the lowest 20% of billionaires rated.

In 2012, Warren donated $10 million to help build Klyde Warren Park in downtown Dallas. It is named for his son. As part of the contract, his son cleans up trash from the park once a month. The construction of the park cost about $90 million. Warren's gift was the largest, giving him naming rights.

== Political activity ==
Warren donated $6 million to Governor Rick Perry's 2016 presidential campaign. He also donated $103,000 to President Donald Trump's 2016 presidential campaign. Together with his spouse Amy, Warren contributed $1.8 million to President Donald Trump's 2020 presidential campaign. In August 2020, Warren gave $10 million to the America First Action super PAC, which supports Donald Trump. In May 2024, Warren hosted a fundraiser in Houston for Donald Trump. In total, Warren and his wife contributed more than $20 million to Trump's presidential runs between 2016 and 2024. He gave $1 million to Greg Abbott after Texas's 2021 legislative session. He donated $5 million to pro-Trump super PAC Make America Great Again Inc. in May 2024.

Warren has called for environmental activists to be "removed from the gene pool."

== Personal life ==
Warren married the former Sherry Johnson on May 18, 1980, in Dallas, and they divorced in 1991. He married Amy Hudson on June 3, 2010, in Dallas. He has one son, Klyde Warren.

He lives in Preston Hollow, Dallas on an 8+-acre estate on Park Lane valued at more than $30 million. In 2012, press reports indicated he owned an estate on an island off the coast of Honduras.

In 2010, he bought the 3,500-acre BootJack Ranch near Pagosa Springs, Colorado, for $46.5 million. He also owns an 8,000-acre ranch near Cherokee, Texas, the 20,000-acre Lajitas Golf Resort and Spa in Lajitas, Texas, and a private island near Roatán, Honduras.

In 2020 Warren acquired Castletown Cox house and estate in County Kilkenny, Ireland for €12.6m.
