= Byron Hunt =

American football player (born 1958)

No. 57
- Position: Linebacker

Personal information
- Born: December 17, 1958 (age 67); Longview, Texas, U.S.
- Listed height: 6 ft 5 in (1.96 m)
- Listed weight: 238 lb (108 kg)

Career information
- High school: White Oak (White Oak, Texas)
- College: SMU
- NFL draft: 1981: 9th round, 224th overall pick

Career history
- New York Giants (1981–1988); Detroit Lions (1989)*
- * Offseason or practice squad member only

Awards and highlights
- Super Bowl champion (XXI)

Career NFL statistics
- Games played: 100
- Sacks: 6.5
- Interceptions: 2
- Fumble recoveries: 3
- Stats at Pro Football Reference

Byron Ray Hunt (born December 17, 1958) is an American former professional football player who was a linebacker in the National Football League (NFL) for the New York Giants. He was selected in the ninth round of the 1981 NFL draft. He played college football for the SMU Mustangs.

== Early life ==
Hunt attended White Oak High School. He accepted a football scholarship from Southern Methodist University.

== Professional career ==
Hunt was selected by the New York Giants in the ninth round (224th overall) of the 1981 NFL draft.

In the seventh game of the 1982 season, he sacked Washington Redskins quarterback Joe Theismann, cracking Theismann's front teeth in half.

In 1985, he started 11 games at left outside linebacker, opposite of Lawrence Taylor. He eventually was passed on the depth chart by Carl Banks.

In the Week 10 game of 1986 season, the Philadelphia Eagles quarterback Ron Jaworski, tore a tendon on the little finger of his right as a result of a hit by Hunt.

On September 15, 1988, he was released to make room for linebacker Johnie Cooks.

In 1989, he signed as a free agent with the Detroit Lions. He was released on August 22, 1989.

== Personal life ==
Hunt is the younger brother of former New England Patriots linebacker Sam Hunt.
