= Brandon Carter (American football) =

American football player (born 1986)

No. 60
- Position: Guard

Personal information
- Born: September 10, 1986 (age 40); Lakewood Township, New Jersey, U.S.
- Listed height: 6 ft 6 in (1.98 m)
- Listed weight: 319 lb (145 kg)

Career information
- High school: Spring Hill (Longview, Texas)
- College: Texas Tech
- NFL draft: 2010: undrafted

Career history
- New Orleans Saints (2010)*; Tampa Bay Buccaneers (2010); Dallas Cowboys (2011)*
- * Offseason or practice squad member only

Awards and highlights
- Consensus All-American (2008); Third-team All-American (2009); First-team All-Big 12 (2009)

Career NFL statistics
- Games played: 1
- Stats at Pro Football Reference

Brandon Scott Carter (born September 10, 1986) is an American former professional football player who was a guard in the National Football League. He played college football for the Texas Tech Red Raiders. He was signed by the New Orleans Saints as an undrafted free agent in 2010. After football he signed to WWE, where he worked in their developmental territory NXT Wrestling under the name TAC.

== Early life ==
Carter was born in Lakewood Township, New Jersey. He attended Spring Hill High School in Longview, Texas, he played nose guard and defensive tackle until his senior season, when he broke his hand, causing him to play on the offensive line.

As a junior, he received district defensive MVP and honorable-mention All-state honors. As a senior, he received Class 3A All-State first-team honors.

In track and field he competed in the shot put, finishing third in the state as a senior.

== College career ==
Carter accepted a football scholarship from Texas Tech University. As a redshirt freshman in 2006, he played in 12 games mainly on special teams. He had one start against Iowa State University.

As a sophomore in 2007, he started all 13 games. As a junior in 2008, he was a starter at guard and allowed only one sack. He contributed to the team having an 11–2 record.

As a senior in 2009, Carter was listed at No. 15 on Rivals.com′s preseason offensive tackle power ranking. He was also named to the 2009 Outland Trophy watch list. On September 27, 2009, Carter was suspended indefinitely for violating team rules. He was reinstated on October 4, after missing only a single game.

He is remembered for his intense personality, multi-colored mohawk, and wrestling style face paint while at Texas Tech.

== Professional career ==
=== New Orleans Saints ===
Carter was signed as an undrafted free agent by the New Orleans Saints on April 26, 2010. He was waived from the team on September 4 and signed to the practice squad the next day. He was released by the Saints on September 15.

=== Tampa Bay Buccaneers ===
On September 14, 2010, he was signed to the Tampa Bay Buccaneers practice squad. He was promoted to the active roster on November 30. He was waived/injured on August 29, 2011.

=== Dallas Cowboys ===
On December 27, 2011, he was signed to the Dallas Cowboys practice squad. He wasn't re-signed after the season.

== Professional wrestling ==
Carter signed a developmental deal with the WWE in 2012 and would report to their developmental territory NXT Wrestling, where he was known as TAC. On January 14, 2013, Carter was released from his contract.

== Awards and honors ==
- 2007, 2008 All-Big 12 honorable mention
- 2008 AFCA Coaches’ first-team All-American
- 2008 Associated Press second-team All-American
