= National Register of Historic Places listings in Gregg County, Texas =

Location of Gregg County in Texas

This is a list of the National Register of Historic Places listings in Gregg County, Texas.

This is intended to be a complete list of properties and districts listed on the National Register of Historic Places in Gregg County, Texas. There are two districts and seven individual properties listed on the National Register in the county. All individually listed properties are also Recorded Texas Historic Landmarks.

This National Park Service list is complete through NPS recent listings posted March 21, 2025.

== Current listings ==
The locations of National Register properties and districts may be seen in a mapping service provided.

	Name on the Register	Image	Date listed	Location	City or town	Description
1	Everett Building	Everett Building	November 15, 1979 (#79002948)	214-216 Fredonia St. 32°29′43″N 94°44′19″W	Longview	Recorded Texas Historic Landmark
2	Greggton Commercial Historic District		April 16, 2024 (#100010239)	Bounded by West Marshall Avenue/US Highway 80 to the south, North Supply Street to the west, West Aztec Alley to the north, and Pine Tree Road to the east 32°30′27″N 94°47′42″W	Longview	
3	Longview National Bank		August 1, 2023 (#100009217)	213 North Fredonia St. 32°29′44″N 94°44′19″W	Longview	
4	McWilliams Building	McWilliams Building	March 25, 2019 (#100003536)	208 N. Green St. 32°29′42″N 94°44′12″W	Longview	
5	Northcutt House	Northcutt House	May 22, 1978 (#78002938)	313 S. Fredonia St. 32°29′29″N 94°44′27″W	Longview	Recorded Texas Historic Landmark
6	Nuggett Hill Historic District		May 1, 1998 (#98000403)	Roughly bounded by W. Marshall, N. 6th, Padon, and Teague Sts. 32°30′06″N 94°43′35″W	Longview	
7	Petroleum Building	Petroleum Building	March 6, 2019 (#100003494)	202 E. Whaley St. 32°29′48″N 94°44′15″W	Longview	
8	Frank Taylor and Kate Womack Rembert House	Frank Taylor and Kate Womack Rembert House	December 30, 2011 (#11000980)	316 S. Fredonia St. 32°29′28″N 94°44′24″W	Longview	Recorded Texas Historic Landmark
9	Whaley House	Whaley House	May 23, 1980 (#80004122)	101 E. Whaley St. 32°29′51″N 94°44′18″W	Longview	Recorded Texas Historic Landmark

== See also ==
- National Register of Historic Places listings in Texas
- Recorded Texas Historic Landmarks in Gregg County
