= Mack Rankin =

American oil tycoon (1930–2013)

- Born: Byron McLean Rankin, Jr. January 8, 1930; Mineola, Texas, U.S.
- Died: August 14, 2013 (aged 83); Dallas, Texas, U.S.
- Other name: Mack Rankin
- Education: Kilgore Junior College; University of Texas at Austin (BBA)
- Occupation: Oil business
- Spouse(s): Opal Cook Rankin (divorced; 1 child)
- Children: Richard Rankin
- Relatives: Sam Rankin (brother)

Byron McLean Rankin, Jr., nicknamed "Mack," was a prominent member in the Texas oil industry who became a part-owner of the Texas Rangers.

== Personal life ==
Rankin was born in Mineola, Texas, on January 8, 1930. He initially attended Kilgore Junior College before transferring to the University of Texas at Austin, where he earned a B.B.A. in accounting.

He spent four years serving as a First Lieutenant, and eventually an Officer of Procurement in the United States Army during the implementation of The Marshall Plan while stationed in Germany after WWII. Mack was especially proud of his years in the service. He remained politically active his entire career, later becoming an aggressive advocate for effective governing of oil industry regulations.

Rankin entered the oil business working for an oilfield company in Post, Texas. From 1955 to 1967, he worked for Hunt Oil Company before joining geologists Jim Bob Moffett and Kent McWilliams to form McMoRan Oil Company and McMoRan Exploration Company. He served as president of the oil and gas company from 1968 to 1975 and as chairman of the executive committee and co-chairman of the board of the exploration firm from 1975 to 1977.

Rankin was a private pilot and an avid golfer. Rankin was a member of at least a dozen clubs, including Brook Hollow, and was a director at Preston Trail and Pine Valley golf clubs.

Because of his diagnosis and ongoing treatment for Chronic Lymphocytic Leukemia, Mr. Rankin retired from active management in 1977, and continued to serve in the capacities of Vice Chairman of the Board and Consultant to the Company, and Member of the Board of Directors, Executive Committee and major shareholder until his passing.

He died on August 14, 2013, at the age of 83, in Dallas, Texas and was buried there in the Sparkman-Hillcrest Memorial Park Cemetery.

== Oil endeavors ==
He gained expertise in the oil industry through his work at Hunt Oil Company. Subsequently, he collaborated with Jim Bob Moffett and W.K. McWilliams, Jr. (Kent) to establish McMoRan Oil, Inc. & McMoRan Exploration Company. The company was publicly listed in 1969 following a stock exchange with Horn Silver Mines, and was renamed McMoRan Oil & Gas Company, a Delaware corporation. It debuted on the New York Stock Exchange in 1978. He served as President of the company from 1968 to 1975, and from 1975 to 1977, he held the roles of Co-Chairman of the Board and Chairman of the Executive Committee. The company eventually merged with Freeport Minerals, forming Freeport-McMoRan while maintaining McMoRan Exploration as a subsidiary. This merger resulted in the creation of the largest phosphate fertilizer and sulfur producer in the United States. In 1995, the company further spun off Freeport-McMoRan Copper & Gold, Inc., which operates significant mining operations in Indonesia, employing over 15,000 people.

In 2007, Freeport-McMoRan Copper & Gold acquired Phelps Dodge, becoming the world's largest publicly traded copper producer, the largest molybdenum producer, and a major producer of cobalt and gold, with a workforce of 38,000.

His directorial roles extended to serving on the boards of Freeport-McMoRan Copper and Gold Inc., McMoRan Exploration Inc., and P.T. Freeport Indonesia. He was also the Chairman of the U.S. Oil & Gas Association. His industry involvement included membership in the Dallas Wildcat Committee, the Dallas Petroleum Club, the Texas Oil & Gas Association, and the All-American Wildcatters, where he was known for his annual roasts as 'The Big Gusher.'

== Other endeavors ==
Rankin purchased a stake in the Texas Rangers in the early 1980s, becoming a minority owner and sitting on the team's six-man board of directors. He sold his share of the team to majority owner Eddie Chiles in October 1982.

In 2012, he commissioned Canadian biographer Rachel Landry to write his memoirs. The manuscript, entitled Recollections of a Badass, was completed a few months before he died in 2013 and remains unpublished.

== Philanthropy ==
He was a well-known University of Texas booster. He is recognized for his many endowments including the B.M. Rankin (Mack) Rankin, Jr. Professorship in Business Administration, the Athletic Department Scholarship, and the Head Football Coach Endowment. He was asked to lead the fundraising campaign for the expansion of the Darrell K. Royal Texas Memorial Stadium. He is also a lifetime trustee of the Sigma Phi Epsilon fraternity Foundation and past National Director of the same fraternity.

Mr. Rankin's name prominently hangs over the entrance to the Longhorn Dining Hall, which he partly funded. He also endowed scholarships at Jesuit College Preparatory School, which his son Richard attended. Mack was recognized as an Outstanding Alumnus at both Gladewater High School and the University of Texas, where he was also inducted into the McCombs School of Business Hall of Fame.

Mr. Rankin was the Co-Founder and Chairman of the Chronic Lymphocytic Leukemia Global Research Foundation, now nationally recognized by M.D. Anderson's inclusion in their Moon Shots Research Program, one of only six departments of the Cancer Center so recognized. He was also one of the longest surviving patients in M.D. Anderson history.
