= Sparkman-Hillcrest Memorial Park Cemetery =

Cemetery in Dallas, Texas

Coordinates: 32.868°N 96.781°W

Sparkman-Hillcrest Memorial Park Cemetery is a multi-faith cemetery located at 7405 West Northwest Highway in North Dallas, Texas, United States. It is owned by Service Corporation International. Among the notable persons interred here are:

- Mary Kay Ash (1918–2001), businesswoman
- Harry W. Bass Jr. (1927–1998), businessman
- Faith (1992–2001) and Liberty Battaglia (1995–2001), murder victims
- Orville Bullington (1882–1956), lawyer and Republican politician
- Maureen Connolly (1934–1969), champion tennis player
- Grace Noll Crowell (1877–1969), poet
- Jim Cummins (1945–2007), NBC News reporter
- Roscoe DeWitt (1894–1975), architect
- Bill Forester (1932–2007), NFL linebacker (1953–1963)
- Greer Garson (1904–1996), British-American actress
- Pinky Higgins (1909–1969), Major League Baseball player and manager
- Ted Hinton (1904–1977), deputy sheriff involved in the capture of the bandits Bonnie and Clyde
- William Hootkins (1948–2005), actor
- Tom Hughes (1931–1994), managing producer of Dallas Summer Musicals
- H. L. Hunt (1889–1974), businessman, one of the wealthiest men in the world
- Lamar Hunt (1932–2006) founder of AFL and MLS sports leagues, owner of Kansas City Chiefs. Son of H.L. Hunt
- Neel Kearby (1911–1944), World War II Medal of Honor recipient
- Justin Ford Kimball (1872–1956), school superintendent, founder of what would eventually become Blue Cross Blue Shield
- Freddie King (1934–1976), blues musician
- Tom Landry (1924–2000), Hall of Fame head coach of Dallas Cowboys; cenotaph at Texas State Cemetery in Austin
- Cyrus Longworth Lundell (1907–1994), scientist
- Merlyn Mantle (1932–2009), author and widow of Mickey Mantle
- Mickey Mantle (1931–1995), Hall of Fame baseball player
- James F. Moriarty (1896–1981), decorated brigadier general in the Marine Corps
- Clint Murchison Jr. (1923–1987), businessman, founder of Dallas Cowboys
- Wilbert Lee O'Daniel (1890–1969), governor of Texas and U.S. senator
- Jim Parker (1947–2019), lawyer and businessman, former CEO of Southwest Airlines.
- Ross Perot (1930–2019), business magnate, billionaire, philanthropist, and politician.
- Nelson Phillips (1873–1939), Chief Justice of the Supreme Court Of Texas
- B.M. "Mack" Rankin Jr. (1930–2013), businessman, co-founder of Freeport-McMoRan
- Gretchen Celeste Neff Rogers (1934–2020), senior vice president at Metropolitan Financial Savings and Loan
- August Schellenberg (1936–2013), Kanienʼkehá꞉ka actor
- Annette Strauss (1924–1998), mayor of Dallas, Texas
- John Tower (1925–1991), United States senator from 1961 to 1985; cenotaph at Texas State Cemetery in Austin; the first Mrs. Tower, the former Lou Bullington (1920–2001), is also interred at Sparkman-Hillcrest.
- George Washington Truett (1867–1944), pastor of First Baptist Church of Dallas from 1897 to 1944
- Henry Wade (1914–2001), district attorney of Dallas County from 1951 to 1987
- Joseph Franklin Wilson (1901–1968), politician
- Charles Wyly Jr. (1933–2011), entrepreneur, businessman, philanthropist and civic leader
- Lewis Sperry Chafer (1871-1952), Founder and first president of Dallas Theological Seminary, 20th century theologian

== See also ==
- List of United States cemeteries
