= Gladewater Mirror =

- Type: Weekly newspaper
- Publisher: Jim Bardwell
- Editor: Jim Bardwell
- Founded: 1928
- Headquarters: 211 N. Main; Gladewater, Texas 75647-2736; USA
- Circulation: 467 (as of 2023)
- Website: www.gladewatermirror.com

The Gladewater Mirror is a weekly newspaper in Gladewater, Texas.

== History ==
The paper was first published in 1928 as the Gladewater Daily Journal and then became the Gladewater Daily Mirror in the 1930s. Another paper, the Gladewater Daily Times competed for several years before merging into the Gladewater Daily Times-Tribune. In the 1950s, the Gladewater Mirror was formed. The Gladewater Mirror services both Gregg and Upshur counties. The paper published as a daily newspaper from 1949 until sometime in the 1960s when it became a weekly paper.

Publication and ownership of the paper included both Harry Kates starting in 1954 and then later his son Jerry Kates through 1989, when the paper was sold to the Westward newspaper chain. In 2012, the paper was purchased by Texas Community Media LLC.

In 2024, the Lindale News & Times was absorbed into the Gladewater Mirror.
