= Gladewater Park, Texas =

- Unincorporated community
- Location within Texas Location within the United States
- Coordinates: 32°30′42″N 94°58′38″W
- Country: United States
- State: Texas
- County: Gregg
- Elevation: 354 ft (108 m)
- Time zone: UTC-6 (Central (CST))
  - Summer (DST): UTC-5 (CDT)
- Area codes: 430 & 903
- GNIS feature ID: 1336559

Gladewater Park is an unincorporated community in Gregg County, located in the U.S. state of Texas.
