= Gladewater High School =

Coordinates: 32.5473°N 94.9639°W

Location
- 2201 W. Gay Avenue; Gladewater, Texas 75647; United States

Information
- School type: Public high school
- Motto: The Race for EXCELLENCE Has No Finish Line
- School district: Gladewater Independent School District
- Principal: Derrick Floyd
- Teaching staff: 39.73 (FTE)
- Grades: 9-12
- Enrollment: 467 (2023-2024)
- Student to teacher ratio: 11.75
- Colors: Orange & Black
- Athletics conference: UIL Class 3A
- Mascot: Bear
- Yearbook: Bear's Tale
- Website: Gladewater High School

Gladewater High School is a public high school located in the city of Gladewater, Texas, United States and classified as a 3A school by the UIL. It is a part of the Gladewater Independent School District located in southeast Upshur County and northwest Gregg County. Gladewater High School is actually located in Upshur County. In 2015, the school was rated "Met Standard" by the Texas Education Agency.

== History ==
On April 30, 1955, Elvis Presley performed in the school gymnasium. Six teams of tickets sellers were dispatched by the club on April 12 to canvass the area. During the weeks before this show, the Louisiana Hayride heavily promoted it and there were requests from all over the south and Southwest for tickets. The weekend of the show, there was not a vacant hotel or motel room in Gladewater.

By show time, approximately 3,000 country music fans were jammed into the 2,500 seats as the Gladewater High Gymnasium, and everything that would be used to fan the air was brought into service. To protect the basketball floor, a combination covering of paper and canvas was laid down. Admission was $1.00 for adults and 50-cents for children.

A half-hour portion of the show was broadcast nationwide on the CBS radio network, and the entire evening was aired on KWKH in Shreveport and KTHS in Little Rock.

The current campus replaced a previous campus that at the time was 50 years old. Construction on the new campus started in July 1982 built by the Del E. Webb Corporation. Construction was completed in 1983.

== Athletics ==
The Gladewater Bears compete in these sports -

Volleyball, Cross Country, Football, Basketball, Powerlifting, Soccer, Golf, Tennis, Track, Baseball & Softball

=== State titles ===
- Boys Track
  - 1985(3A)
  - 1961(2A), 1967(2A)

== Theater ==
- One Act Play

== Notable alumni ==
- Michael Gunter, football player
- Daylon Mack, football player
- Mack Rankin, oil executive
