= Jim Cummins (reporter) =

American television reporter (1945–2007)

- Born: March 11, 1945; Cedar Rapids, Iowa, U.S.
- Died: October 27, 2007 (aged 62); Plano, Texas, U.S.
- Resting place: Sparkman-Hillcrest Memorial Park Cemetery, Dallas, Texas
- Education: Northwestern University B.A. 1967, M.A. 1968 (journalism)
- Occupations: News reporter, NBC News; Southwest bureau chief
- Notable credit: NBC News reporter (1978–2007)
- Spouse: Constance Driscoll Cummins
- Children: 3 sons, 3 daughters
- Website: NBC profile

Jim Cummins (March 11, 1945 – October 26, 2007) was an American television reporter for the NBC News network. He became a recognizable member of the network, having worked there for nearly thirty years.

== Education ==
Cummins was born in Cedar Rapids, Iowa. He was a basketball player and member of the Regis Catholic High School 1962 state champion squad. From 1963 to 1967, Cummins attended Northwestern University's Medill School of Journalism and earned both his bachelor's and master's degrees. He was also a forward at for the Wildcats basketball team at NU.

== Career ==
Cummins began his professional career at KGLO-TV in Mason City, Iowa, in 1969. From there, his career took him to WOTV (Grand Rapids, Michigan), WTMJ-TV (Milwaukee), and WMAQ (Chicago).

He joined NBC News in 1978 working out of their Chicago bureau. In 1989, Cummins reopened NBC's Southwest bureau in Dallas, becoming its correspondent. Over the years, he reported on various stories including U.S. political coverage, plane crashes, the Iran hostage crisis, the Salvadoran Civil War, the Oklahoma City bombing, many hurricanes, floods, and tornadoes, and live coverage of the Waco Siege. Cummins' work manifested itself when he won an Award for his coverage of the Midwest floods in 1993. He also earned two National Emmy nominations for his coverage of Hurricane Hugo and the Salvadoran Civil War.

Cummins retired from his NBC position in 2007, but shortly after was diagnosed with cancer. He died at the Presbyterian Hospital of Plano on October 26 at age 62, and was buried at Sparkman-Hillcrest Memorial Park Cemetery in Dallas. Cummins was survived by his widow and six children.

== Personal life ==
Jim Cummins had an extensive family consisting of his wife, Connie of Dallas; three daughters, Chrissy Cummins and Molly Cummins, both of Dallas, and Kim of Lafayette; three sons, John Cummins of Dallas, Billy Cummins, a student of University of Oklahoma, and Doug Cummins of Waco; two brothers, Richard Cummins of New York City and Bob Cummins of Sarasota; and two grandchildren. He also coached youth baseball and basketball teams for his six children.

== Molestation lawsuits ==
In 1962, Cummins, then a 17-year-old altar boy, alleged that he was sexually molested by his parish priest, Reverend William Roach. In 2002, his repressed history was reflected through Cummins's interview with a family dealing with a similar situation. Cummins filed the first of fifteen lawsuits against the Archdiocese of Dubuque and priests accused of child molestation.
