= Union Grove, Texas =

- City
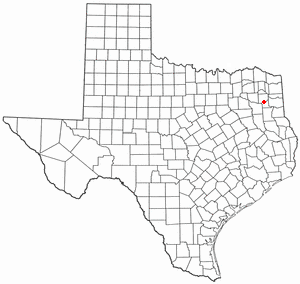
- Location of Union Grove, Texas

- Coordinates: 32°35′0″N 94°54′35″W
- Country: United States
- State: Texas
- County: Upshur

Area
  - Total: 0.95 sq mi (2.45 km^{2})
  - Land: 0.93 sq mi (2.42 km^{2})
  - Water: 0.012 sq mi (0.03 km^{2})
- Elevation: 410 ft (125 m)

Population (2020)
  - Total: 441
  - Density: 472/sq mi (182/km^{2})
- Time zone: UTC-6 (Central (CST))
  - Summer (DST): UTC-5 (CDT)
- FIPS code: 48-74312
- GNIS feature ID: 2412132

Union Grove is a city in Upshur County, Texas, United States. The population was 441 at the 2020 census.

== Geography ==
According to the United States Census Bureau, the city has a total area of 1 square mile (2.6 km^{2}) , all land.

== Demographics ==
Historical population
Census	Pop.	Note	%±
1980	344		—
1990	271		−21.2%
2000	346		27.7%
2010	357		3.2%
2020	441		23.5%
U.S. Decennial Census; 2020 Census

=== 2020 census ===
As of the 2020 census, Union Grove had a population of 441 and a median age of 34.5 years. 31.1% of residents were under the age of 18 and 13.2% of residents were 65 years of age or older. For every 100 females there were 91.7 males, and for every 100 females age 18 and over there were 98.7 males age 18 and over.

There were 148 households in Union Grove, of which 43.9% had children under the age of 18 living in them. Of all households, 55.4% were married-couple households, 17.6% were households with a male householder and no spouse or partner present, and 23.0% were households with a female householder and no spouse or partner present. About 19.0% of all households were made up of individuals and 9.5% had someone living alone who was 65 years of age or older.

There were 156 housing units, of which 5.1% were vacant. The homeowner vacancy rate was 0.0% and the rental vacancy rate was 14.3%.

The 2020 census Demographic and Housing Characteristics data indicates that 55.1% of residents lived in urban areas, while 44.9% lived in rural areas.

Racial composition as of the 2020 census
Race	Number	Percent
White	408	92.5%
Black or African American	8	1.8%
American Indian and Alaska Native	6	1.4%
Asian	1	0.2%
Native Hawaiian and Other Pacific Islander	0	0.0%
Some other race	2	0.5%
Two or more races	16	3.6%
Hispanic or Latino (of any race)	23	5.2%

=== 2000 census ===
As of the 2000 census, there were 346 people, 120 households, and 89 families residing in the city. The population density was 361.1 inhabitants per square mile (139.4/km^{2}). There were 130 housing units at an average density of 135.7 per square mile (52.4/km^{2}). The racial makeup of the city was 93.93% White, 3.47% African American, 0.29% Native American, 1.45% from other races, and 0.87% from two or more races. Hispanic or Latino of any race were 2.02% of the population.

There were 120 households, out of which 36.7% had children under the age of 18 living with them, 59.2% were married couples living together, 9.2% had a female householder with no husband present, and 25.8% were non-families. 19.2% of all households were made up of individuals, and 8.3% had someone living alone who was 65 years of age or older. The average household size was 2.88 and the average family size was 3.35.

In the city, the population was spread out, with 32.7% under the age of 18, 9.0% from 18 to 24, 28.9% from 25 to 44, 20.8% from 45 to 64, and 8.7% who were 65 years of age or older. The median age was 34 years. For every 100 females, there were 96.6 males. For every 100 females age 18 and over, there were 86.4 males.

The median income for a household in the city was $38,750, and the median income for a family was $48,750. Males had a median income of $40,313 versus $25,000 for females. The per capita income for the city was $14,444. About 23.8% of families and 24.3% of the population were below the poverty line, including 35.8% of those under age 18 and 17.4% of those age 65 or over.

== Education ==
The City of Union Grove is served by the Union Grove Independent School District.
