= Inland Township, Cedar County, Iowa =

Township in Iowa, US

Inland Township, Cedar County
- Township
- Coordinates: 41°44′01″N 090°57′16″W
- Country: United States
- State: Iowa
- County: Cedar

Area
  - Total: 36.37 sq mi (94.21 km^{2})
  - Land: 36.37 sq mi (94.21 km^{2})
  - Water: 0 sq mi (0 km^{2})
- Elevation: 774 ft (236 m)

Population (2000)
  - Total: 773
  - Density: 21/sq mi (8.2/km^{2})
- FIPS code: 19-92046
- GNIS feature ID: 0468075

Inland Township is one of seventeen townships in Cedar County, Iowa, United States. As of the 2000 census, its population was 773.

== Geography ==
Inland Township covers an area of 36.37 square miles (94.2 km^{2}) and contains one incorporated settlement, Bennett. According to the USGS, it contains two cemeteries: Inland and Moneka.
