= Gladewater Independent School District =

School district in Texas, United States

Address
- 200 East Broadway Gladewater, Texas, 75647; United States

District information
- Type: Public
- Grades: PK–12
- Schools: 4
- NCES District ID: 4820760

Students and staff
- Students: 1,636 (2024–2025)
- Teachers: 124.17 (on an FTE basis) (2024–2025)
- Staff: 159.78 (on an FTE basis) (2024–2025)
- Student–teacher ratio: 13.18 (2024–2025)

Gladewater Independent School District is a public school district based in Gladewater, Texas, United States.

The district covers most of the towns of Gladewater, Warren City, Clarksville City, and a very small portion of White Oak. Mrs.Ray Ann Patty is the current Superintendent of Schools.

== Schools ==
- Gladewater High School (grades 9-12)
- Gladewater Middle (grades 6-8)
- Weldon Elementary (grades 2-5)
- Gay Avenue Primary (prekindergarten-grade 1)
