= Sam Hunt (American football) =

American football player (born 1951)

No. 50
- Position: Linebacker

Personal information
- Born: August 6, 1951 (age 75); Longview, Texas, U.S.
- Listed height: 6 ft 1 in (1.85 m)
- Listed weight: 248 lb (112 kg)

Career information
- High school: White Oak (TX)
- College: Stephen F. Austin
- NFL draft: 1974: 15th round, 374th overall pick

Career history
- New England Patriots (1974–1979); Green Bay Packers (1980)

Awards and highlights
- PFWA All-Rookie Team (1974); New England Patriots All-1970s Team; New England Patriots 35th Anniversary Team

Career NFL statistics
- Interceptions: 7
- Touchdowns: 1
- Fumble recoveries: 6
- Stats at Pro Football Reference

Sam Hunt (born August 6, 1951) is an American former professional football player who was a linebacker in the National Football League (NFL). He played college football for the Stephen F. Austin Lumberjacks and was selected by the New England Patriots in the 15th round of the 1974 NFL draft. Hunt also played for the Green Bay Packers. His younger brother Byron also played in the NFL.
