= White Oak Independent School District =

School district in Texas

White Oak Independent School District is a public school district based in White Oak, Texas (USA). The district covers most of the town of White Oak as well as a small portion of Clarksville City.

In 2009, the school district was rated "recognized" by the Texas Education Agency.

== UIL History ==
As of 2024, the school is classified as IIIA.

Notable departments include: One Act Play (OAP), Debate, Social Studies, Computer Science, and Science.

== Duel-Credit/Certification Courses ==
As of 2024, White Oak ISD offers Structural Firefighter and Patient Care Technician certifications through Kilgore College, and MIG Welder Certifications through their FFA program.

== Schools ==
- White Oak High (Grades 9-12)
- White Oak Middle (Grades 6-8)
- White Oak Intermediate (Grades 3-5)
- White Oak Primary (Grades PK-2)
