= Spring Hill Independent School District =

School district in Texas

Coordinates: 32°33′46″N 94°47′47″W

Location
- Longview, Texas; United States

District information
- Type: Public
- Motto: Proud Past ... Promising Future ...
- Superintendent: Penny Fleet
- Enrollment: 2075

Other information
- Website: www.shisd.net

Spring Hill Independent School District is a public school district based in Longview, Texas (USA). The district serves the northern portion of Longview. The school's mascot is the Panthers, and the school colors are royal blue and white.

Brandon Carter, who attended Spring Hill High School played college football at Texas Tech University where he was an All-American Right Guard under Head Coach Mike Leach. Brandon is now playing in the NFL for the New Orleans Saints. The Panther's marching band, the "Blue Brigade", provides music during sports events and is an All- State Band.

In 2009, the school district was rated "academically acceptable" by the Texas Education Agency.

== Schools ==
- Spring Hill High School (Grades 9–12)
  - The school mascot is the panther.
- Spring Hill Junior High (Grade 6–8)
- Spring Hill Intermediate (Grades 3–5)
- Spring Hill Primary (Grades PK-2)
