= Gregg County, Texas =

County in Texas, United States

- County
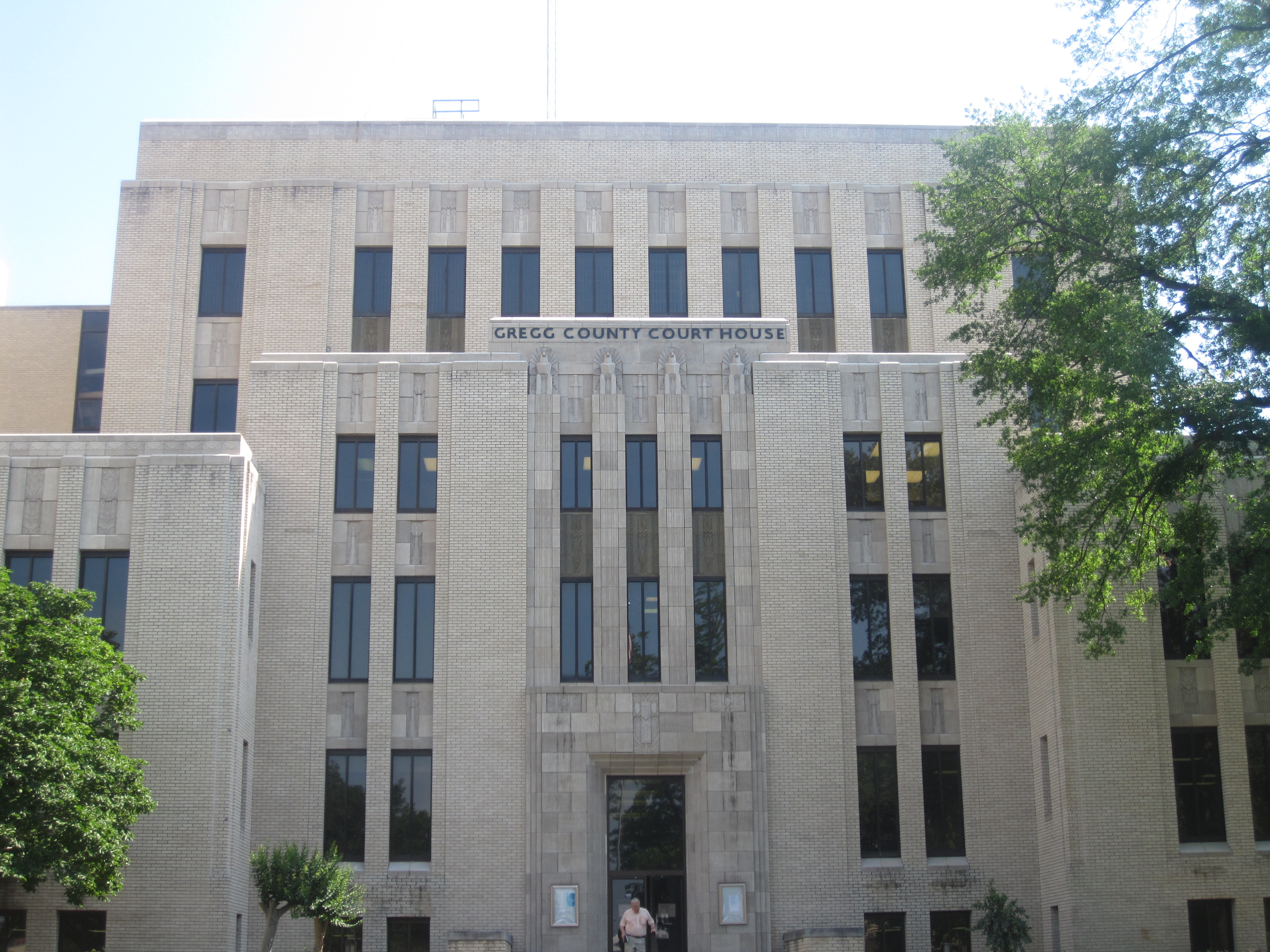
- The Gregg County Courthouse of Art Deco design in Longview designed by architects Voelcker and Dixon. William R. Hughes was the county judge when the structure was completed in 1932.

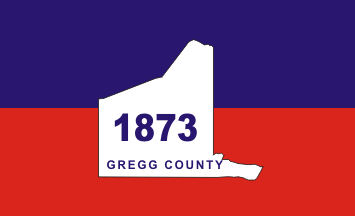
- Flag Seal

- Location within the U.S. state of Texas
- Coordinates: 32°29′N 94°49′W
- Country: United States
- State: Texas
- Founded: 1873
- Named for: Gen. John Gregg
- Seat: Longview
- Largest city: Longview

Area
  - Total: 276 sq mi (710 km^{2})
  - Land: 273 sq mi (710 km^{2})
  - Water: 2.5 sq mi (6.5 km^{2}) 0.9%

Population (2020)
  - Total: 124,239
  - Estimate (2025): 126,095 ▲
  - Density: 455/sq mi (176/km^{2})
- Time zone: UTC−6 (Central)
  - Summer (DST): UTC−5 (CDT)
- Congressional district: 1st
- Website: greggcounty.texas.gov

Gregg County is a county located in the eastern part of the U.S. state of Texas. As of the 2020 census, its population was 124,239. Its county seat is Longview. The county is named after John Gregg, a Confederate general killed in action during the American Civil War.

Gregg County is part of the Longview, Texas metropolitan area and the Longview–Marshall, Texas combined statistical area. Discovery of oil near Kilgore in October 1930 was the beginning of an oil boom that attracted workers to the county and expanded the population by more than 500% by 1940, according to the census. By that time, the economy had stabilized, but the East Texas Oil Field, extending into five counties, has continued to be important to the county and region's economy.

== History ==
This area was among early sections settled by United States immigrants before Texas became an independent republic, and after 1845, a state of the United States. It was an area developed as cotton plantations dependent on slave labor of African Americans. Lumbering of the pine forests was also pursued, especially in the early years of clearing the land for cultivation.

Gregg County was organized in 1873 after the American Civil War from portions of existing counties. When the Texas State Legislature convened in January 1873, Democratic representative B. W. Brown of Upshur County introduced a bill to create a new county from parts of Harrison, Rusk, and Upshur Counties. He was likely trying to break up the black majority that dominated county politics in Harrison County. Under Brown's proposal, the county was to be named Roanoke, and Longview was to be the county seat. The proposed name was later changed to honor Texas leader and Confederate General John Gregg, and the county seat was determined by popular election.

Harrison and Rusk Counties resisted efforts to have portions of their territory assigned to Gregg County. When Gregg County was created, it first consisted of about 143 square miles (370 km^{2}) taken from Upshur County, and the Sabine River was its southern boundary. In April 1874, about 141 square miles (370 km^{2}) south of the Sabine River in Rusk County was added to Gregg County. The third portion, of about 145 square miles (380 km^{2}) to be taken from Harrison County, was never realized. Many of its voters continued to elect Republicans to county offices.

By 1919, the county population was 16,700, of whom 8,160, or 48%, were Black. Most were sharecroppers or tenant farmers raising cotton as a commodity crop. Members of the Negro Business League set up a cooperative store in Longview to compete with White merchants and offer African-American residents more choices for purchases. Beginning July 10, the town had a short-lived Longview Race Riot, in which one Black man was killed, and several Black-owned homes and properties were burned. It was quelled when the sheriff asked for Texas National Guard and other law enforcement. They established a curfew and military occupation.

Agricultural work declined during the Great Depression of the 1930s, and many African Americans continued to leave in the Great Migration north to find other work.

In October 1930, oil was discovered near Joinerville, between Henderson, Texas (Rusk County) and Kilgore (mostly in southwest Gregg County). And shortly after, oil was discovered within Gregg County, near Pine Tree/East Mountain (Lathrop No 1). Suddenly, the county economy was booming, and the East Texas Oil Field attracted so many workers that county population increased by more than 500% by 1940. Growth stabilized, but oil has continued to be important. County demographics changed as other workers were attracted to the area. In the early 21st century, slightly less than 20% of the population is African American.

== Geography ==
According to the U.S. Census Bureau, the county has a total area of 276 square miles (710 km^{2}), of which 2.5 square miles (6.5 km^{2}) (0.9%) are covered by water.

=== Major highways ===
- Interstate 20
- U.S. Highway 80
- U.S. Highway 259
- U.S. Highway 271
- State Highway 31
- State Highway 42
- State Highway 135
- State Highway 149
- State Highway 300
- State Highway 322
- Loop 281
- Loop 485
- Spur 63
- Spur 502

=== Adjacent counties ===
- Upshur County (north)
- Harrison County (east)
- Rusk County (south)
- Smith County (west)

=== Communities ===
==== Cities ====
- Clarksville City (small part in Upshur County)
- East Mountain (mostly in Upshur County)
- Easton (partly in Rusk County)
- Gladewater (partly in Upshur County)
- Kilgore (small part in Rusk County)
- Lakeport
- Longview (small part in Harrison County)
- Warren City (small part in Upshur County)
- White Oak

==== Census-designated places ====
- Lake Cherokee
- Liberty City

==== Other unincorporated communities ====
- Danville
- Elderville
- Fredonia
- Gladewater Park
- Judson
- Seven Pines
- Shiloh
- Teneryville

==== Former communities ====
- Greggton - annexed to Longview in the 1950s
- Spring Hill - annexed to Longview on October 7, 1983

== Demographics ==
Historical population
Census	Pop.	Note	%±
1880	8,530		—
1890	9,402		10.2%
1900	12,343		31.3%
1910	14,140		14.6%
1920	16,767		18.6%
1930	15,778		−5.9%
1940	58,027		267.8%
1950	61,258		5.6%
1960	69,436		13.4%
1970	75,929		9.4%
1980	99,487		31.0%
1990	104,948		5.5%
2000	111,379		6.1%
2010	121,730		9.3%
2020	124,239		2.1%
2025 (est.)	126,095	▲	1.5%
U.S. Decennial Census; 1850–2010 2010 2020

=== Racial and ethnic composition ===
Gregg County, Texas – Racial and ethnic composition Note: the US Census treats Hispanic/Latino as an ethnic category. This table excludes Latinos from the racial categories and assigns them to a separate category. Hispanics/Latinos may be of any race.
Race / Ethnicity (NH = Non-Hispanic)	Pop 1980	Pop 1990	Pop 2000	Pop 2010	Pop 2020	% 1980	% 1990	% 2000	% 2010	% 2020
White alone (NH)	79,022	80,358	76,851	74,005	68,050	79.43%	76.57%	69.00%	60.79%	54.77%
Black or African American alone (NH)	17,629	19,835	21,989	24,068	24,974	17.72%	18.90%	19.74%	19.77%	20.10%
Native American or Alaska Native alone (NH)	356	455	426	497	424	0.36%	0.43%	0.38%	0.41%	0.34%
Asian alone (NH)	390	480	745	1,316	1,614	0.39%	0.46%	0.67%	1.08%	1.30%
Native Hawaiian or Pacific Islander alone (NH)	x	x	17	35	47	x	x	0.02%	0.03%	0.04%
Other race alone (NH)	79	45	46	119	298	0.08%	0.04%	0.04%	0.10%	0.24%
Mixed race or Multiracial (NH)	x	x	1,122	1,672	4,792	x	x	1.01%	1.37%	3.86%
Hispanic or Latino (any race)	2,011	3,775	10,183	20,018	24,040	2.02%	3.60%	9.14%	16.44%	19.35%
Total	99,487	104,948	111,379	121,730	124,239	100.00%	100.00%	100.00%	100.00%	100.00%

=== 2020 census ===
As of the 2020 census, the county had a population of 124,239. The median age was 37.5 years; 24.3% of the residents were under 18 and 17.0% were 65 or older. For every 100 females, there were 93.4 males, and for every 100 females 18 and over, there were 89.8 males 18 and over.

The racial makeup of the county was 58.8% White, 20.3% Black or African American, 0.7% American Indian and Alaska Native, 1.3% Asian, <0.1% Native Hawaiian and Pacific Islander, 9.4% from some other race, and 9.4% from two or more races. Hispanic or Latino residents of any race comprised 19.3% of the population.

About 86.5% of residents lived in urban areas, while 13.5% lived in rural areas.

Of the 48,130 households in the county, 32.5% had children under 18 living in them, 44.3% were married-couple households, 18.5% were households with a male householder and no spouse or partner present, and 31.3% were households with a female householder and no spouse or partner present. About 28.7% of all households were made up of individuals, and 12.1% had someone living alone who was 65 or older. The county had 53,212 housing units, of which 9.6% were vacant. Among occupied housing units, 58.9% were owner-occupied and 41.1% were renter-occupied. The homeowner vacancy rate was 1.9% and the rental vacancy rate was 10.4%.

=== 2000 census ===
According to the 2000 census, 111,379 people, 42,687 households, and 29,667 families were residing in the county. The population density was 406 inhabitants per square mile (157/km^{2}) in 2000; the 46,349 housing units averaged 169 per square mile (65/km^{2}).

The racial makeup of the county was 72.89% White, 19.86% African American, 0.52% Native American, 0.68% Asian, 4.57% from other races, and 1.49% from two or more races; about 9.14% of the population was Hispanic or Latino of any race.

In 2000, median income for a household in the county was $35,006, and for a family was $42,617. Males had a median income of $33,186 versus $21,432 for females. The per capita income for the county was $18,449. About 12.00% of families and 15.10% of the population were below the poverty line, including 20.50% of those under age 18 and 11.40% of those age 65 or over.

=== Income ===
By 2020, its median household income was $52,027 with a mean income of $73,022.

== Education ==
These school districts serve Gregg County:

- Gladewater ISD (partly in Smith, Upshur Counties)
- Kilgore ISD (partly in Rusk County)
- Longview ISD
- Pine Tree ISD
- Sabine ISD
- Spring Hill ISD
- White Oak ISD

All of the school districts' areas in the county are assigned to Kilgore College.

== Media ==
Gregg County is part of the Tyler/Longview/Jacksonville DMA. Local media outlets are: KLTV, KTRE-TV, KYTX-TV, KFXK-TV, KCEB-TV, and KETK-TV.

The Longview News-Journal is the primary newspaper in the county, published in Longview. Coverage of the area can also be found in the Tyler Morning Telegraph, based in Tyler, in Smith County. The Gladewater Mirror has been published since 1949, first as a daily newspaper and then as a weekly newspaper.

== Gallery ==
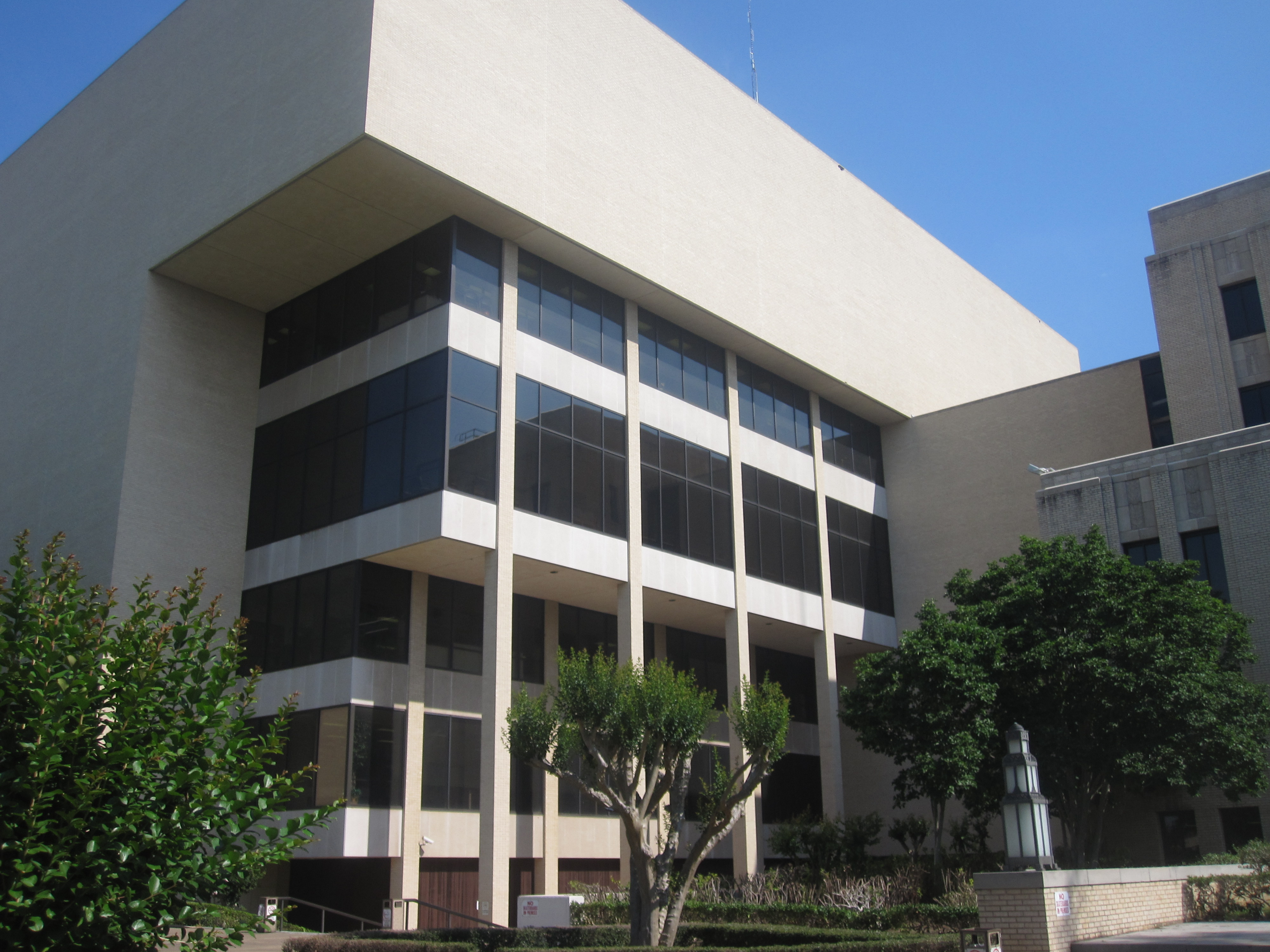
The annex building is attached to the Gregg County Courthouse.

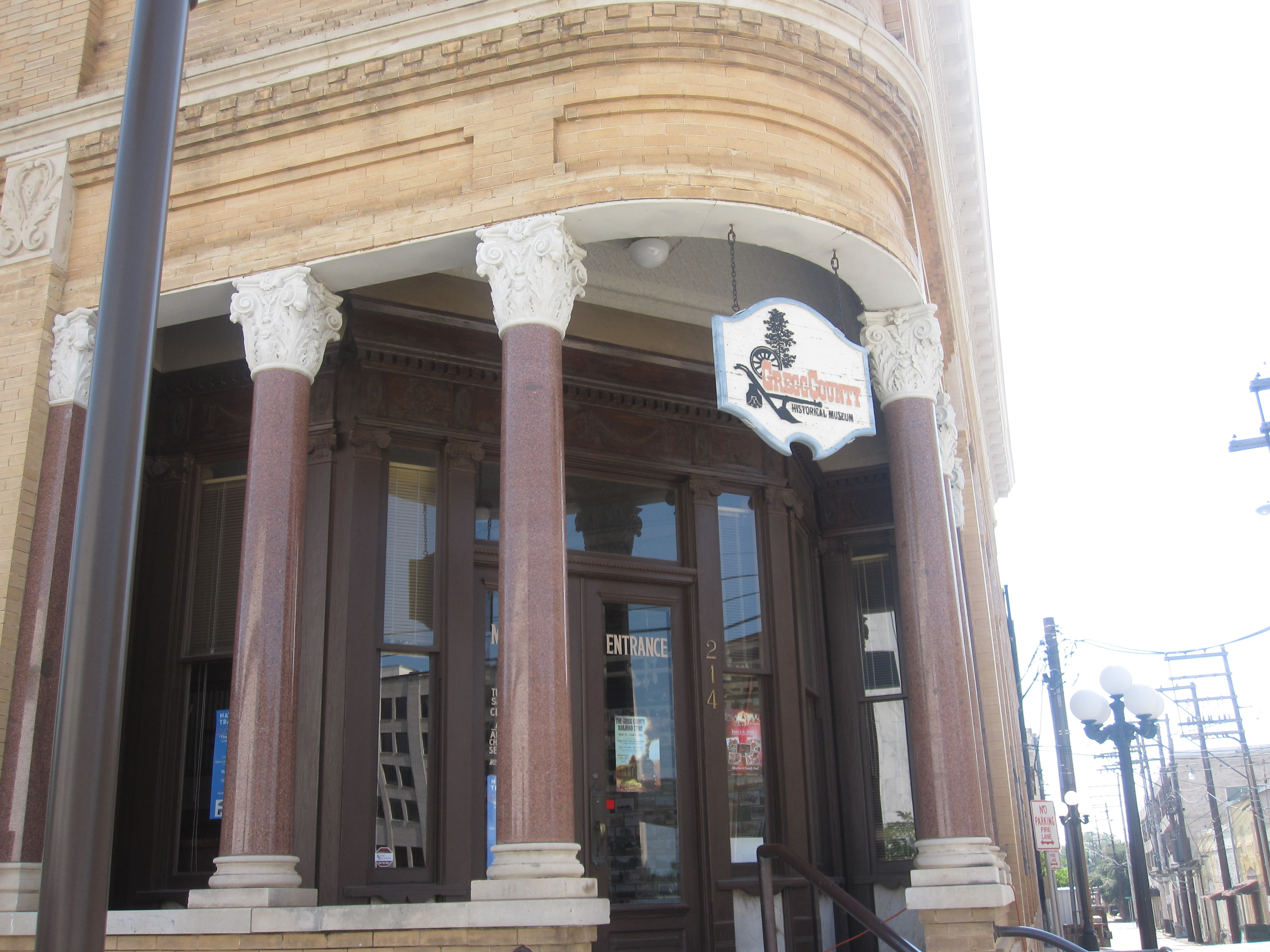
The Gregg County Historical Museum is located in the historic district of Longview.

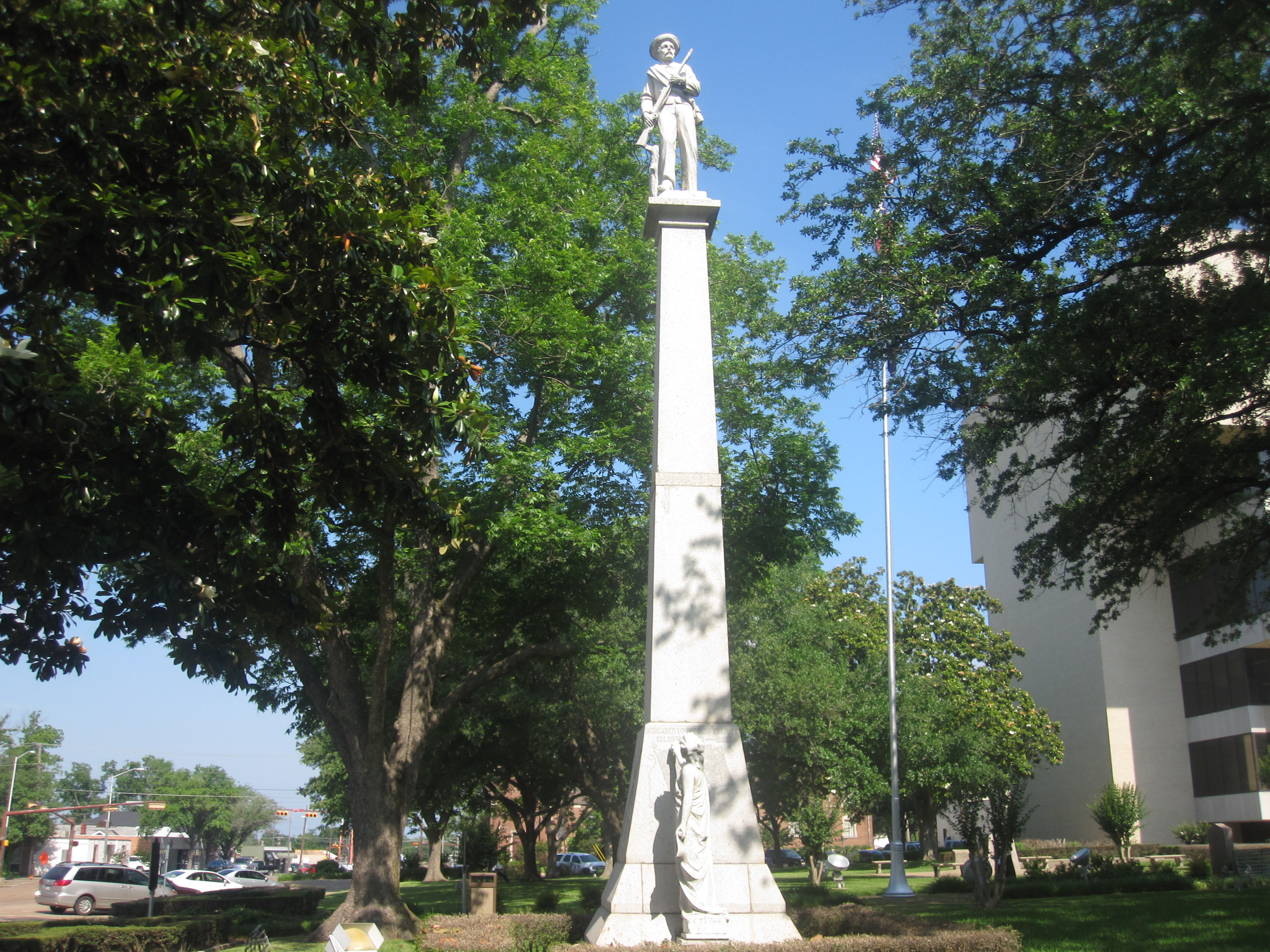
Monument to the Confederate soldier at the Gregg County Courthouse in Longview, completed by Frank Teich, 1911

== Politics ==
United States presidential election results for Gregg County, Texas
Year	Republican		Democratic		Third party(ies)	
Year	No.	%	No.	%	No.	%
1912	129	16.52%	590	75.54%	62	7.94%
1916	159	15.81%	820	81.51%	27	2.68%
1920	257	16.89%	1,050	68.99%	215	14.13%
1924	177	10.59%	1,286	76.96%	208	12.45%
1928	646	39.29%	996	60.58%	2	0.12%
1932	341	6.13%	5,204	93.51%	20	0.36%
1936	621	8.72%	6,489	91.12%	11	0.15%
1940	1,584	14.41%	9,391	85.45%	15	0.14%
1944	1,412	15.56%	6,401	70.52%	1,264	13.93%
1948	2,477	23.45%	5,104	48.31%	2,984	28.24%
1952	10,583	56.31%	7,969	42.40%	242	1.29%
1956	9,440	65.02%	4,881	33.62%	198	1.36%
1960	10,679	56.99%	7,765	41.44%	293	1.56%
1964	11,761	57.14%	8,741	42.47%	82	0.40%
1968	9,278	40.13%	5,733	24.80%	8,109	35.07%
1972	19,927	77.49%	5,325	20.71%	464	1.80%
1976	17,582	63.68%	9,827	35.59%	203	0.74%
1980	23,399	68.44%	10,219	29.89%	572	1.67%
1984	29,697	73.07%	10,700	26.33%	246	0.61%
1988	26,465	67.19%	12,486	31.70%	436	1.11%
1992	20,542	49.11%	12,797	30.59%	8,490	20.30%
1996	21,611	57.66%	13,659	36.45%	2,208	5.89%
2000	26,739	69.57%	11,244	29.26%	450	1.17%
2004	29,939	70.61%	12,306	29.02%	153	0.36%
2008	29,203	68.54%	13,166	30.90%	241	0.57%
2012	28,742	69.25%	12,398	29.87%	367	0.88%
2016	28,764	68.90%	11,677	27.97%	1,308	3.13%
2020	32,493	67.72%	14,796	30.84%	693	1.44%
2024	33,026	70.66%	13,294	28.44%	418	0.89%

United States Senate election results for Gregg County, Texas1
Year	Republican		Democratic		Third party(ies)	
Year	No.	%	No.	%	No.	%
2024	31,862	68.51%	13,660	29.37%	983	2.11%

United States Senate election results for Gregg County, Texas2
Year	Republican		Democratic		Third party(ies)	
Year	No.	%	No.	%	No.	%
2020	32,467	68.37%	14,025	29.54%	992	2.09%

Texas Gubernatorial election results for Gregg County
Year	Republican		Democratic		Third party(ies)	
Year	No.	%	No.	%	No.	%
2022	24,223	72.93%	8,662	26.08%	330	0.99%

Before the complete disfranchisement of rural freedmen, Gregg County's black freedmen allowed it to vote for William McKinley twice, and for several other Republicans during the Third Party System.

Gregg subsequently became a classic "Solid South" Democratic county between 1904 and 1948, but has since become solidly Republican at a Presidential level, although the presence of a sizeable black population has permitted the Democrats to gain a quarter of the countywide total at virtually every election. Nonetheless, Gregg was one of only 16 Texas counties to vote for Barry Goldwater in his 1964 definitive loss, and the last Democrat to carry the county was Harry S. Truman in 1948.

Gregg County is located within District 7 of the Texas House of Representatives. Gregg County is located within District 1 of the Texas Senate.

== See also ==
- National Register of Historic Places listings in Gregg County, Texas
- Recorded Texas Historic Landmarks in Gregg County
