= Gladewater, Texas =

- City
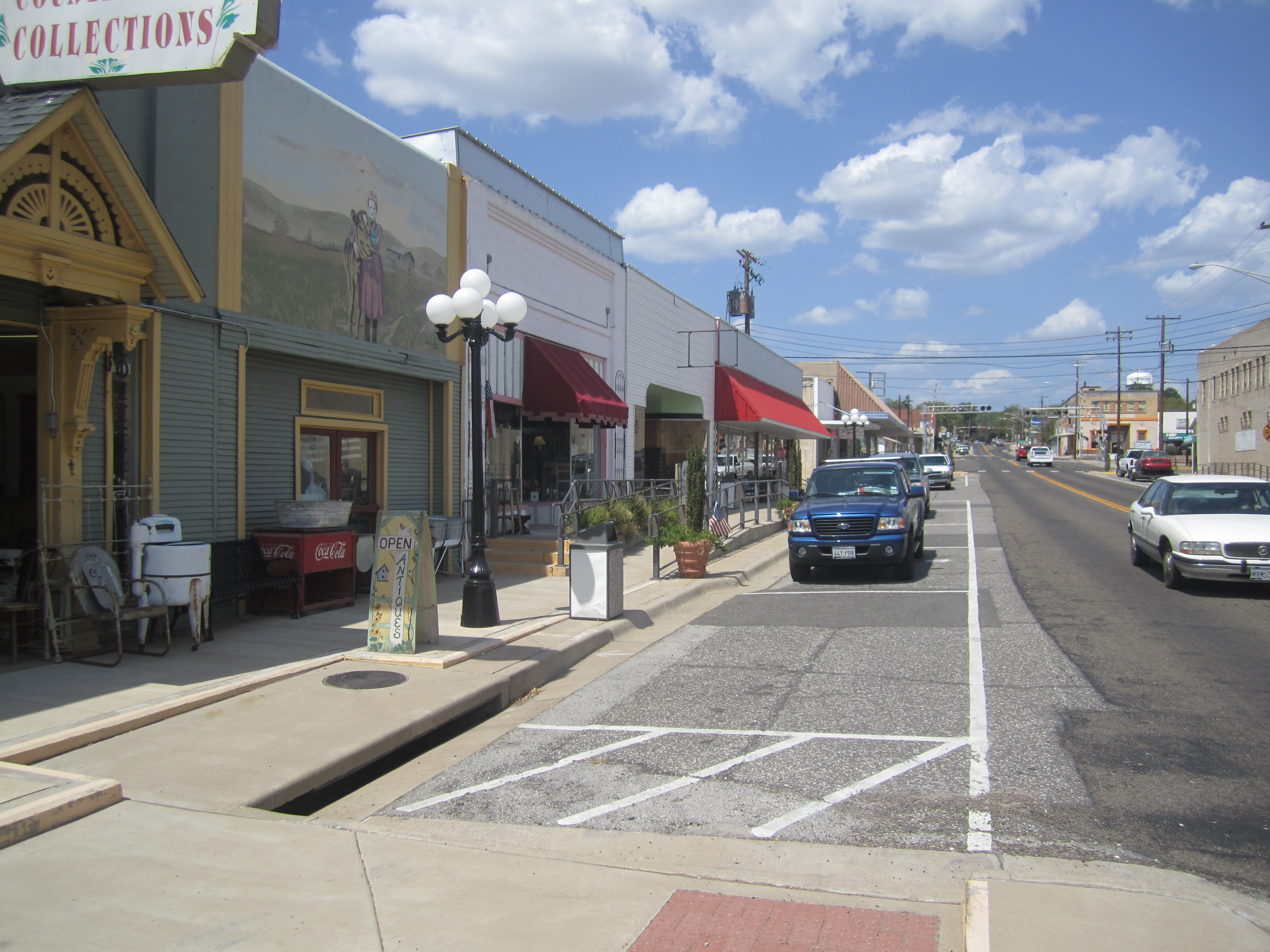
- Antique shops in Gladewater
- Nickname: Antique Capital of East Texas
- Motto(s): "Treasuring the past, while embracing the future"
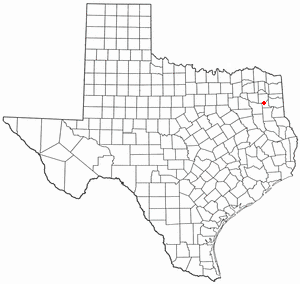
- Location of Gladewater, Texas

- Coordinates: 32°32′33″N 94°56′48″W
- Country: United States
- State: Texas
- Counties: Gregg, Upshur
- Incorporated (town): 1873 (dissolved 1878)
- Incorporated (city): 1931

Government
  - Type: Mayor-Council

Area
  - Total: 12.09 sq mi (31.32 km^{2})
  - Land: 11.57 sq mi (29.96 km^{2})
  - Water: 0.53 sq mi (1.36 km^{2})
- Elevation: 341 ft (104 m)

Population (2020)
  - Total: 6,134
  - Density: 530.3/sq mi (204.7/km^{2})
- Time zone: UTC-6 (Central (CST))
  - Summer (DST): UTC-5 (CDT)
- ZIP code: 75647
- Area codes: 430, 903
- FIPS code: 48-29660
- GNIS feature ID: 2410592
- Website: cityofgladewater.com

Gladewater is a city in Gregg and Upshur Counties in the U.S. state of Texas, with a 2020 census population of 6,134.

In the early 20th century, Gladewater was an oil boom town. In 1995, the Texas Legislature proclaimed it the "Antique Capital of East Texas".

== History ==
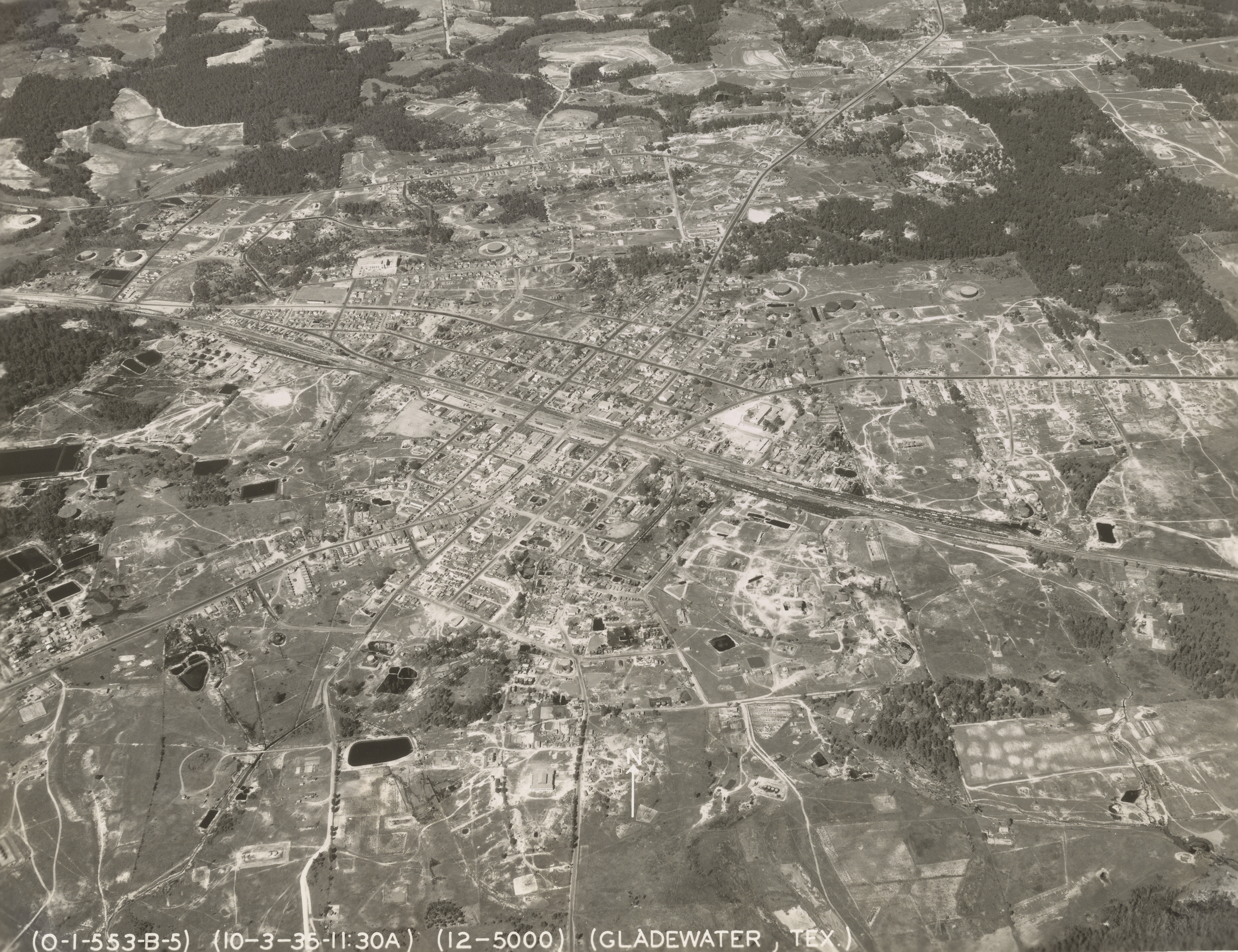
Gladewater in 1935

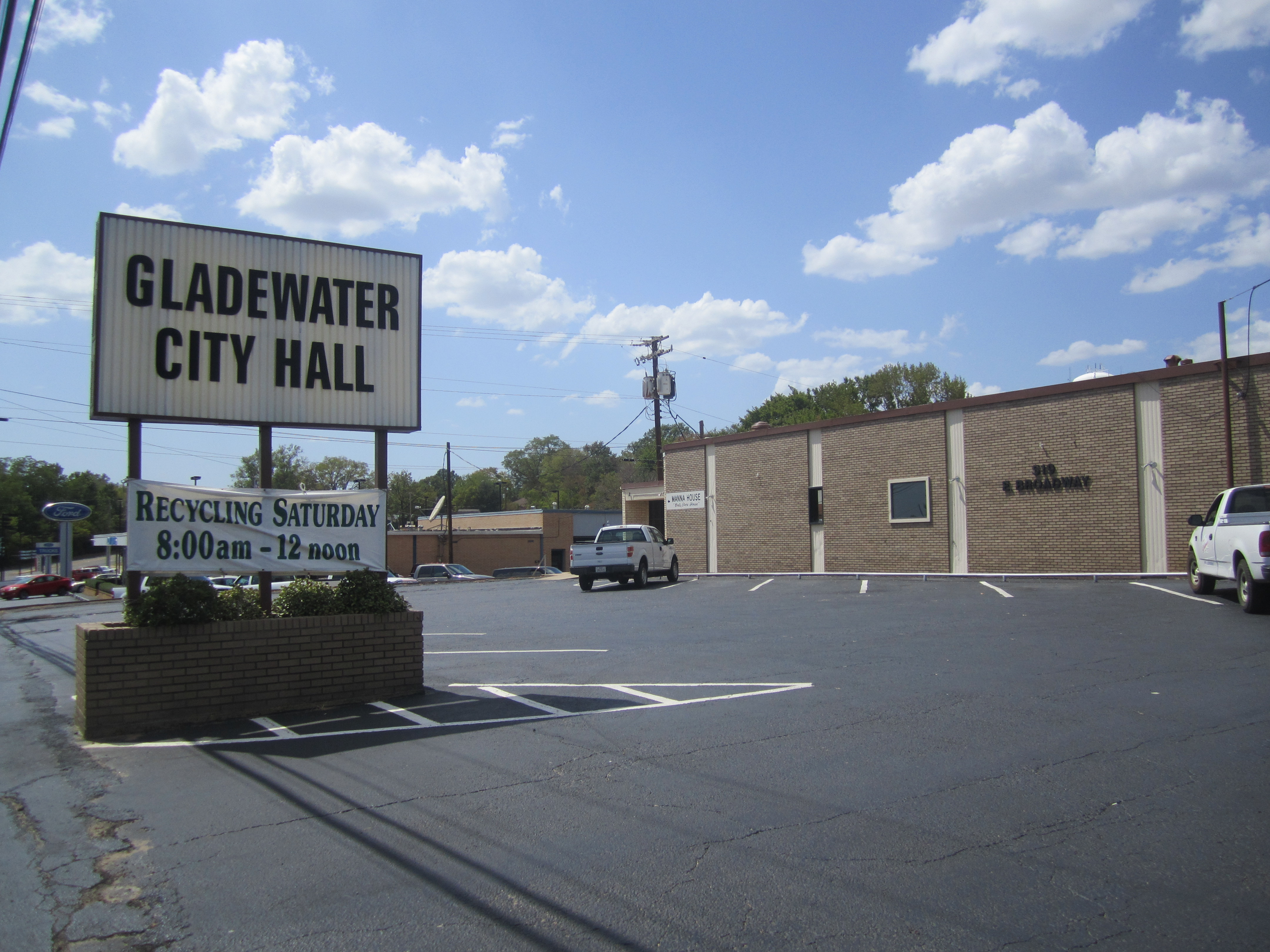
Gladewater City Hall

Gladewater was founded by the Texas and Pacific Railway Company in 1873 on land bought from Jarrett Dean and Anderson White. A community called St. Clair, 2 miles (3 km) to the east, moved to Gladewater when the railroad announced that the only mail stop in the area would be there; residents from Point Pleasant, also bypassed by the railroad, moved to Gladewater. The first post office at Gladewater was established on August 22, 1873. The town's name probably originated from its proximity to Glade Creek, a tributary of the Sabine River that rose in a rather barren region called the Glades.

In 1874, Gladewater was incorporated with a mayor-alderman government. The incorporation lapsed, and a new charter was not obtained until 1931, when an influx of population necessitated organized city government.

Bonnie and Clyde maintained Gregg County connections through Bonnie Parker's sister Billie Mace, who worked at a Gladewater café in early 1934.

In 1955, Gladewater adopted a council-mayor form of government. The population grew slowly during the 19th century; the town had only 163 people in 1880 and 259 in 1900. In the area around Gladewater, lumbering was a major activity, although farming was also important; cotton was the major crop. In 1908, the town had 10 stores, one bank, two blacksmith shops, two hotels, a gin, a sawmill, and a planing mill. It continued to grow slowly until 1931.

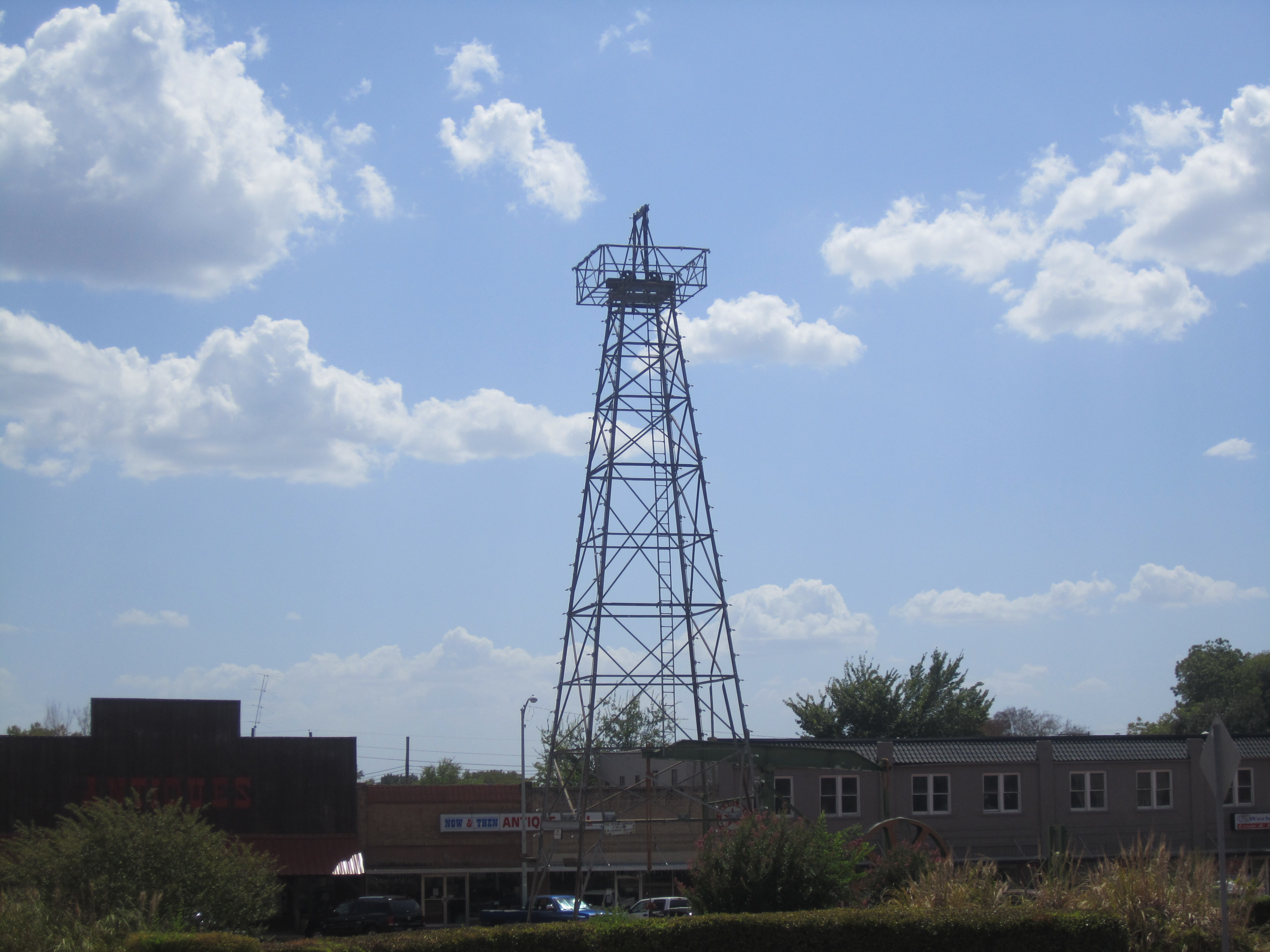
An oil derrick replica in downtown Gladewater recalls the oil-boom years.

On April 7, 1931, the first Gladewater oil well blew in. It was located 1 mi (1.6 km) outside town in the Sabine River bottom. Oil production led to a population increase during the 1930s from about 500 to around 8,000 people. In 1940, after the oil boom, Gladewater had a population of 4,454. Civic improvements in the 1940s included an extensive paving project and a commercial airfield. Between 1940 and 1960, the population grew to 5,742. Lake Gladewater, constructed on Glade Creek in 1954, provides recreation for city residents.

During the 1970s Gladewater moved from an oil-oriented to a more diversified economy, primarily because of depletion of oil resources in the area. The movement of salt water into the western edge of the large East Texas Oil Field affected Gladewater first. By 1980, the town had a total of 6,548 residents, 4,311 in Gregg County and 2,237 in Upshur County. The economy in the 1980s depended on the oil industry and related activities and on the manufacture of such products as furniture, clothing, paper products, and boats. The lumber and agricultural industry was still a driver for the economy, as well. By 1990, the community had become well known for its numerous antique stores. Notable annual festivals include the East Texas Gusher Days in April, the Gladewater Roundup Rodeo in June, the Arts and Crafts Festival in September, and Christmas in November.

In 1935, the Boston Red Sox franchise had a minor league baseball team in Gladewater, the Gladewater Bears. The minor league stadium has since been turned into a city park. The predominant features of the stadium are long gone, but the stadium is located near the Lee Building in Gladewater.

== Geography ==
It is located in western Gregg County and southern Upshur County, primarily within Gregg County. U.S. Route 80 leads east 12 miles (19 km) to Longview and west 10 miles (16 km) to Big Sandy. U.S. Route 271 crosses US 80 in the center of Gladewater, leading north 14 miles (23 km) to Gilmer and southwest 25 miles (40 km) to Tyler.

According to the United States Census Bureau, Gladewater has a total area of 12.2 square miles (31.5 km^{2}), of which 0.54 sq mi (1.4 km^{2}), or 4.61%, is covered by water. The Sabine River forms the southwestern border of the city.

== Demographics ==
Historical population
Census	Pop.	Note	%±
1940	4,454		—
1950	5,305		19.1%
1960	5,742		8.2%
1970	5,574		−2.9%
1980	6,548		17.5%
1990	6,027		−8.0%
2000	6,078		0.8%
2010	6,441		6.0%
2020	6,134		−4.8%
U.S. Decennial Census

=== 2020 census ===
As of the 2020 census, Gladewater had a population of 6,134 people and 1,283 families residing in the city. The median age was 37.8 years; 24.2% of the residents were under 18 and 17.0% were 65 or older. For every 100 females, there were 90.4 males, and for every 100 females 18 and over, there were 87.3 males 18 and over.

About 87.2% of the residents lived in urban areas, while 12.8% lived in rural areas.

Of the 2,341 households in Gladewater, 34.6% had children under 18 living in them, 39.9% were married-couple households, 19.0% were households with a male householder and no spouse or partner present, and 34.6% were households with a female householder and no spouse or partner present. About 27.6% of all households were made up of individuals, and 12.6% had someone living alone who was 65 or older.

The city had 2,661 housing units, of which 12.0% were vacant. The homeowner vacancy rate was 2.4% and the rental vacancy rate was 8.4%.

Racial composition as of the 2020 census
Race	Number	Percentage
White	4,063	66.2%
Black or African American	1,184	19.3%
American Indian and Alaska Native	48	0.8%
Asian	52	0.8%
Native Hawaiian and other Pacific Islander	3	0.0%
Some other race	203	3.3%
Two or more races	581	9.5%
Hispanic or Latino (of any race)	585	9.5%

In 2020, the American Community Survey estimated the median household income was $40,000.

=== 2000 census ===
At the 2000 census, 6,078 people, 2,257 households, and 1,593 families were living in the city. The population density was 523.7 inhabitants per square mile (202.2/km^{2}). The 2,601 housing units had an average density of 224.1 per square mile (86.5/km^{2}). The racial makeup of the city in 2000 was 79.80% White, 16.12% African American, 0.82% Native American, 0.58% Asian, 0.02% |Pacific Islander, 1.58% from other races, and 1.09% from two or more races. Hispanics or Latinos of any race were 3.50% of the population.

The median income in the city for a household was $28,118 and for a family was $32,278. Males had a median income of $24,770 versus $23,271 for females. The per capita income for the city was $14,317. About 15.5% of families and 19.6% of the population were below the poverty line, including 24.9% of those under 18 and 20.9% of those 65 or over.

== Education ==
All of Gladewater in Gregg County is served by the Gladewater Independent School District, home of the Gladewater Bears. Most of the Upshur County portion is also in Gladewater ISD, while a portion is within the Union Grove Independent School District.

School buildings include:

- Gladewater Primary School, formerly Gay Avenue Primary School
- Weldon Elementary School
- Gladewater Middle School
- Gladewater High School
- Truman W. Smith High School

The other school districts serving parts of the city is Sabine Independent School District.

Areas in Gladewater and Union Grove ISD are in the service area of Kilgore Junior College.

== Media ==
The newspaper Gladewater Mirror has been published in the community since 1949. It first was a daily newspaper from 1949 to 1968, and then became a weekly newspaper.

== Notable people ==
- Skip Butler, former punter for the Houston Oilers
- John Floyd, former wide receiver with the San Diego Chargers
- Winston Hill, (1941–2016), Pro Football Hall of Fame tackle, chiefly for the New York Titans and Jets
- Tony Jeffery, former NFL player for the Arizona Cardinals
- Chris Johnson, defensive back for the Oakland Raiders
- Joe R. Lansdale, award-winning author
- Harding Lawrence, president and chairman of Braniff International Airways
- Daylon Mack, USFL Memphis Showboats reserve player
- Delmonico Montgomery, cornerback in the NFL and defensive specialist in the Arena Football League
- James Scott, former Chicago Bears wide receiver
- John Ben Shepperd (1915–1990), former Texas attorney general and civic leader
- Lovie Smith, former head football coach for the Chicago Bears, including leading them to Super Bowl XLI, and the Houston Texans, NFL
- Kelcy Warren, billionaire oil businessman, born in Gladewater
