= White Oak, Texas =

- City
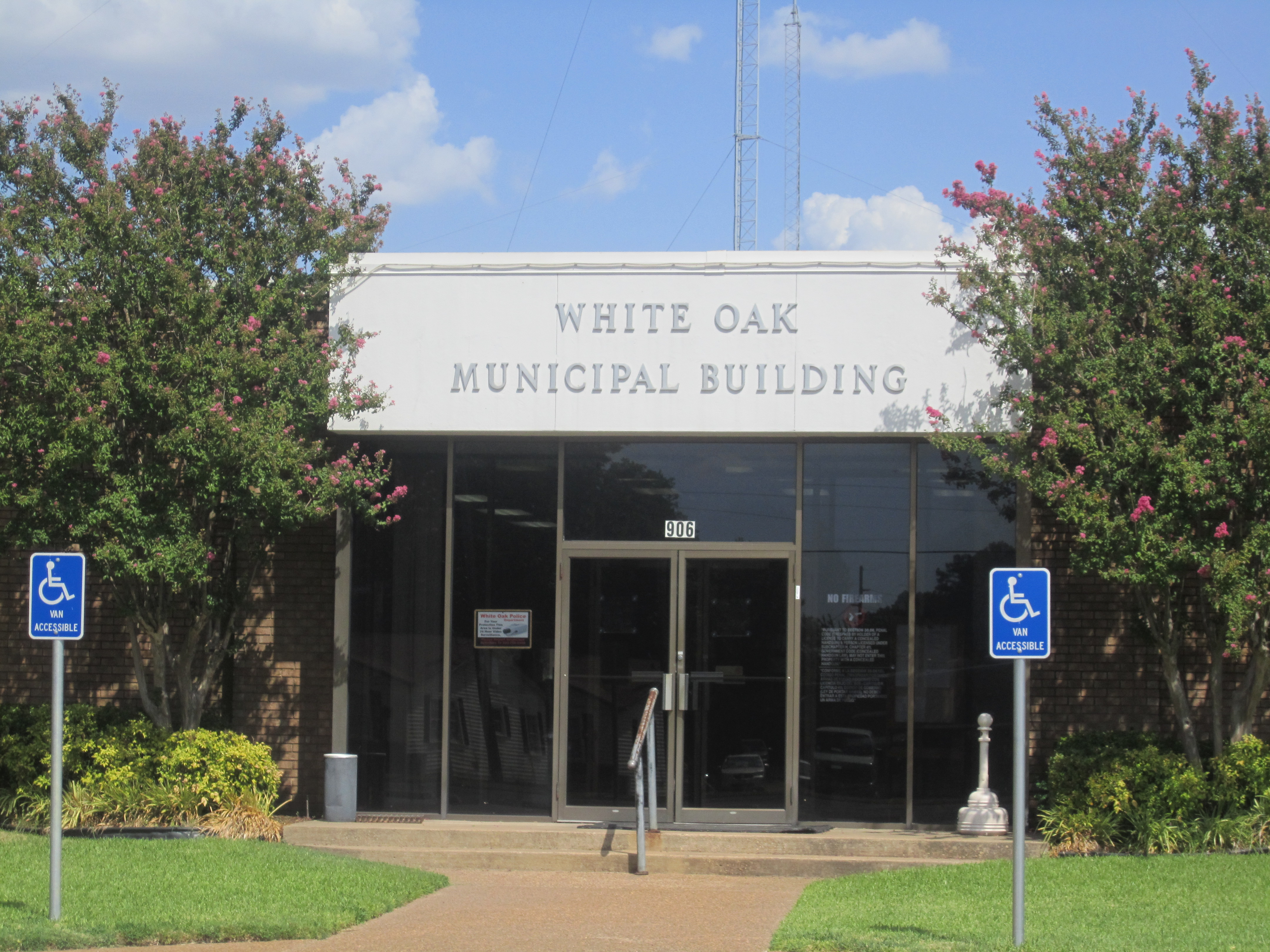
- White Oak Municipal Building
- Motto: "Pride, Tradition"
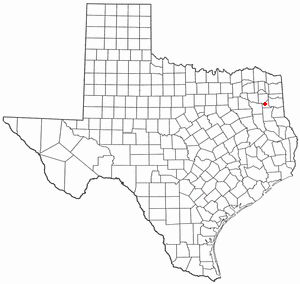
- Location of White Oak, Texas

- Coordinates: 32°31′30″N 94°51′50″W
- Country: United States
- State: Texas
- County: Gregg

Area
  - Total: 9.14 sq mi (23.67 km^{2})
  - Land: 9.09 sq mi (23.54 km^{2})
  - Water: 0.050 sq mi (0.13 km^{2})
- Elevation: 358 ft (109 m)

Population (2020)
  - Total: 6,225
  - Density: 695.5/sq mi (268.54/km^{2})
- Time zone: UTC-6 (Central (CST))
  - Summer (DST): UTC-5 (CDT)
- ZIP code: 75693
- Area codes: 903, 430
- FIPS code: 48-78436
- GNIS feature ID: 2412253
- Website: www.cityofwhiteoak.com

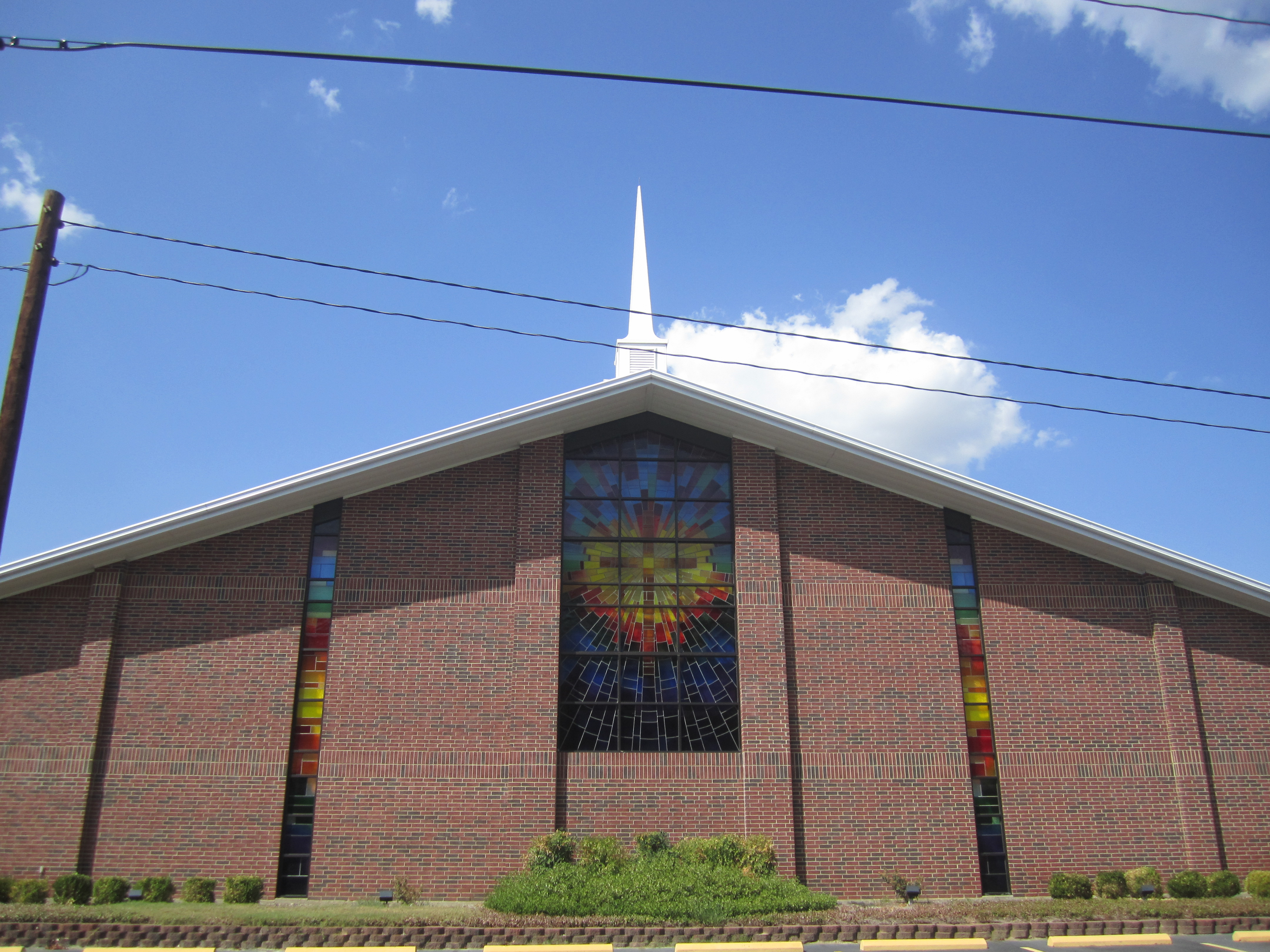
Emmanuel Baptist Church is located off U.S. Highway 80 in White Oak

White Oak is a city in Gregg County, Texas, United States. It was incorporated in 1960. The population was 6,225 as of 2020.

== History ==
In the later parts of the 1800s, White Oak was a small farming community with three sawmills located on thick forested land. By 1884, there were roughly 15 families living in the area. Most sought to either work at the large sawmills dominating the area or farm the land near the creaks and rivers. A small school was built near Hawkins Creek which would also be utilized as a church on Sundays. The school burned to the ground in 1885 due to suspected arson, though no one was ever brought to trial.

A new school was established in 1887. Local land owners, Andrew J. Tuttle and his father-in-law, John Bumpus, gathered a group of men in the area to erect a new school. Mr. Tuttle's uncle, Pleas Harris, and Kaleb Bumpus donated land near a spring on which to build the new school. Local tales say Tuttle and Bumpus noticed the two White Oak trees on either side of the building after construction. It was then decided the community would be known as White Oak.

The community grew during the oil boom of the 1930s, and continued to increase after World War II. The city was incorporated in 1960.

== Geography ==
According to the United States Census Bureau, the city has a total area of 9.1 square miles (24 km^{2}), of which 0.1 square miles (0.26 km^{2}), or 0.55%, is water.

== Demographics ==
Historical population
Census	Pop.	Note	%±
1960	1,250		—
1970	2,300		84.0%
1980	4,415		92.0%
1990	5,136		16.3%
2000	5,624		9.5%
2010	6,469		15.0%
2020	6,225		−3.8%
U.S. Decennial Census

=== 2020 census ===
As of the 2020 census, White Oak had a population of 6,225. The median age was 36.8 years. 27.9% of residents were under the age of 18 and 14.4% of residents were 65 years of age or older. For every 100 females there were 90.9 males, and for every 100 females age 18 and over there were 87.4 males age 18 and over.

Racial composition as of the 2020 census
Race	Number	Percent
White	5,198	83.5%
Black or African American	200	3.2%
American Indian and Alaska Native	53	0.9%
Asian	31	0.5%
Native Hawaiian and Other Pacific Islander	4	0.1%
Some other race	158	2.5%
Two or more races	581	9.3%
Hispanic or Latino (of any race)	559	9.0%

89.3% of residents lived in urban areas, while 10.7% lived in rural areas.

There were 2,245 households and 1,823 families residing in White Oak, of which 42.5% had children under the age of 18 living in them. Of all households, 58.1% were married-couple households, 12.6% were households with a male householder and no spouse or partner present, and 24.8% were households with a female householder and no spouse or partner present. About 18.3% of all households were made up of individuals and 9.0% had someone living alone who was 65 years of age or older.

There were 2,471 housing units, of which 9.1% were vacant. The homeowner vacancy rate was 1.0% and the rental vacancy rate was 15.3%.

== Education ==
The vast majority of the City of White Oak is served by the White Oak Independent School District. A section in the southeast corner of the town is in the Pine Tree Independent School District. A very small portion in the northwestern corner of White Oak is in the Gladewater Independent School District.

The school system in the area was segregated until 1966, when Black children from nearby Shiloh were permitted to enroll in White Oak schools. The Shiloh School, which had been operating since shortly after the Civil War, closed its doors after desegregation.

== Notable people ==
- Mike Barber, tight end for the Houston Oilers, his prison ministry
- Byron Hunt, played for the New York Giants in the early 1980s
- Sam Hunt, linebacker for the New England Patriots from 1974 to 1979
- Max McGee, wide-receiver at Tulane University during the 1950s, later for the Green Bay Packers
- Kelcy Warren, billionaire chairman and CEO of Energy Transfer Partners
