= Northeast Texas Community College =

College near Mount Pleasant, Texas, U.S.

- Motto: Focused
- Type: Public community college
- Established: 1984
- President: Ron Clinton
- Location: Mount Pleasant, Texas, United States; 33.104197°N 94.880556°W
- Campus: Rural, 375 acres (1.52 km^{2})
- Newspaper: The Eagle
- Colors: Red, white, and blue
- Nickname: Eagle
- Website: www.ntcc.edu

Northeast Texas Community College (NTCC) is a public community college near Mount Pleasant, Texas.

== History ==
In January 1984, the voters of Camp, Morris, and Titus counties approved a community college district for the area. The campus (centrally located among the county seats of Daingerfield, Pittsburg, and Mount Pleasant) and facilities were quickly chosen and constructed – by the fall semester of 1985 the first classes were held.

As a relatively modern campus with all new construction, NTCC has kept its main campus buildings of uniform appearance – all buildings are constructed of earth-tone brick with copper-tone metal roofs. In 2010, the college opened the new Elizabeth Hoggatt Whatley Agriculture complex, a Platinum-LEED certified classroom complex featuring the latest in alternative energy and environmentally-friendly technologies. The "net-zero" (producing more energy annually than it consumes) building is home to a Sustainable Agriculture program which teaches people to farm small acreages using a mixture of traditional and alternative farm methods, good business practices, and sensitivity to the long term environmental impact.

In addition to the main campus, the college has the Industrial Technology Training Center in Mount Pleasant, and outreach centers in Naples, Tx, and Pittsburg, Tx. The Culinary Arts program is also in Pittsburg.

The mission of the college is to offer "responsible and exemplary learning opportunities." The college song is "Eagles Soaring On."

NTCC is governed by a seven-member Board of Trustees. Three members are from Titus County, and two members each are from Morris and Camp counties.

== Academics ==
As with other community colleges, NTCC offers basic core courses which can lead to Associate of Arts or Associate of Science degrees, and/or transfer to four-year universities, as well as Associate of Applied Science degrees and certificates which allow students to immediately enter the workforce. NTCC also offers concurrent enrollment options for high school juniors and seniors.

NTCC students may obtain bachelor's degrees from Texas A&M University-Texarkana in the fields of teacher education and criminal justice, while taking all classes at the NTCC campus. NTCC and Texas A & M University at College Station have entered into an articulation agreement to provide a seamless transition for students who completed the Associate of Science Degree in Biomedical Science at NTCC to a Bachelor of Science Degree in Biomedical Science at Texas A & M. NTCC students must complete the A.S. degree with a 3.6 GPA, with no grades below "B" in science and math.

For high-achieving students, NTCC initiated an honors program in the spring of 2007. Each fall, fifteen Presidential Scholars are selected. Graduating seniors and freshmen with exemplary grades are admitted. Students from NTCC's award-winning honors program have presented work at the Great Plains Honors Conference, and the National Collegiate Honors Conference.

The Eagle is the official student monthly newspaper, staffed by students. Print issues are published every month during the fall and spring semesters.

== Service area ==
As defined by the Texas Legislature, the official service area of NTCC comprises the following:

- all of Camp, Morris, and Titus Counties (these counties comprise the tax base for the NTCC District),
- the Avinger and Hughes Springs school districts, located within Cass County,
- the Como-Pickton and Saltillo school districts, located within Hopkins County,
- the Mount Vernon Independent School District, located within Franklin County,
- the Harmony, Ore City, Union Hill, and Winnsboro school districts,
- the portion of the Pewitt Consolidated Independent School District located outside Morris County, and
- the portion of the Pittsburg Independent School District located within Upshur County.

== Student housing ==
NTCC has housing for 214 students. The complex includes Residential Housing West (RHW) and Residential Housing East (RHE). Children under 17 years of age are not permitted to live in the student housing.

== Sports ==
Northeast Texas Community College has a NJCAA Division I baseball team called the Eagles. They play their games at Eagle Field in Mount Pleasant, TX. The stadium features a grass playing field and 25 foot wall similar to the Green Monster that goes from left field to center field. It seats 1200 people and home run wall distances of 309 in left field, 400 in center, and 325 in right field. In 1996 the team won the NJCAA Division 1 National Championship with a record of 48–20. The team was coached by Greg Henry and Ty Harrington.

The Lady Eagles softball team play NJCAA Division I. They have a lighted, grass playing field (newly constructed in 2009) with bleachers and a press box/concession immediately behind home plate. They also have an adjacent practice field.

The men's & women's rodeo team compete across the country and earned 3rd place at Nationals in 2007.

Men's soccer was added in the Fall of 2010 and women's soccer in Fall, 2011. A competition-grade field exists on campus.
