= Kelsey, Texas =

Kelsey
- Ghost town
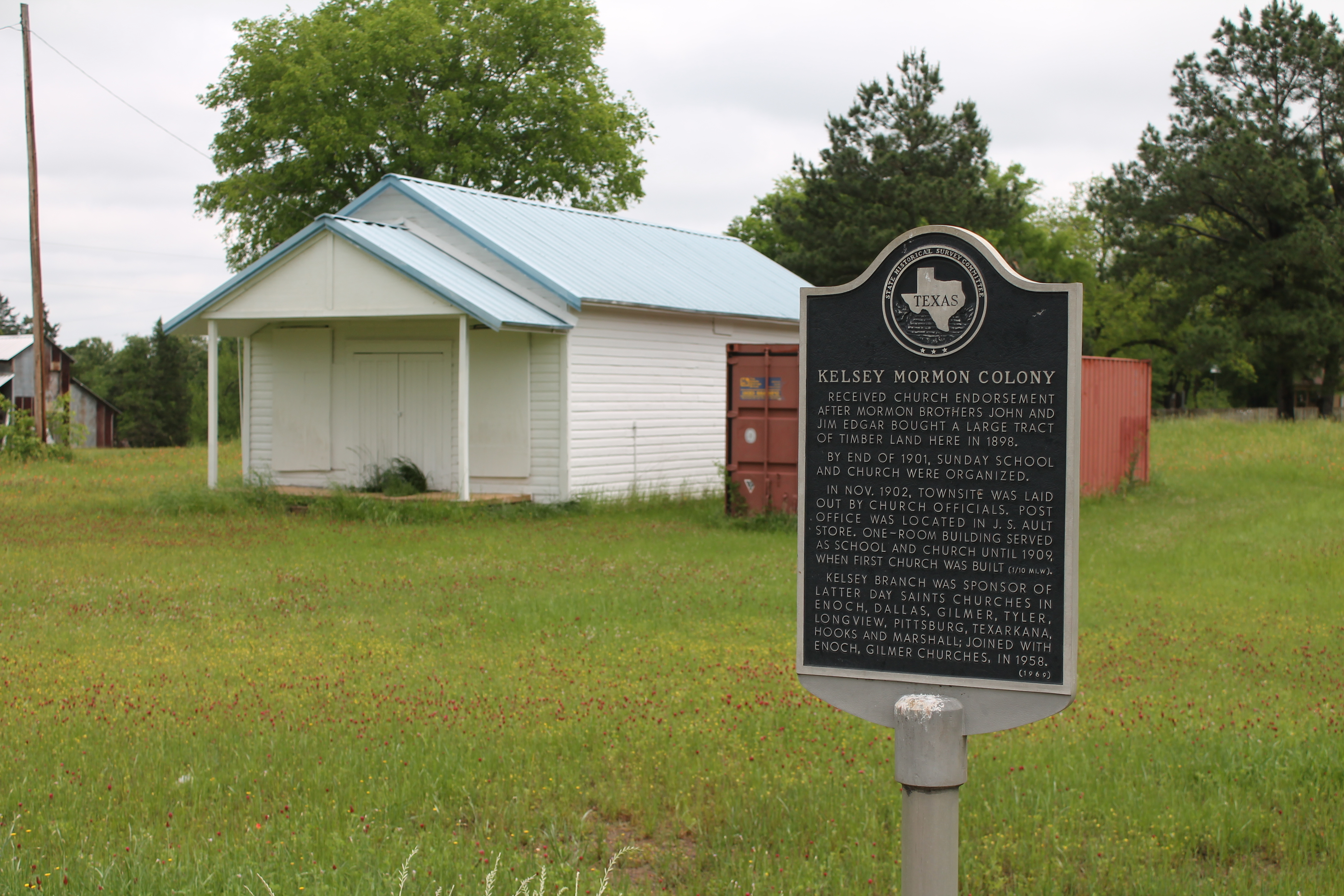

- Location within the state of Texas
- Coordinates: 32°43′54″N 95°2′58″W
- Country: United States
- State: Texas
- County: Upshur

Kelsey is an unincorporated area in Upshur County, Texas, United States that was the longest-lasting settlement founded by members of the Church of Jesus Christ of Latter-day Saints in the state. Now a ghost town, it has been called the "mother colony" of Latter-day Saint colonies in Texas.

== History ==
The naming of Kelsey, Texas came from a true love story. In 1843, Captain William H. Hart moved to Upshur County as a land surveyor and as the first settler in Upshur County. Captain Hart named the creek and community of Kelsey in honor of the Kelsey family, who also were among the first settlers of Upshur County. The Kelsey family included Captain Hart’s sweetheart and future wife, Miss Evaline Kelsey. In fact, Captain Hart had left eastern Tennessee to follow Miss Evaline Kelsey and her family to Marshall, Texas in 1836. Dr. W. H. Kelsey, who was Miss Kelsey’s father, was a physician, merchant, and Methodist preacher. In addition to being a land surveyor, Captain Hart also was the first county clerk of Upshur County, Postmaster of Gilmer, and later represented his district in the state legislature, was a magistrate, Justice of the Peace, Mason, and was a Methodist. His home also was used as the first courthouse for Upshur County.

Citations: A Brief History of Upshur County by G. H. Baird https://genealogytrails.com/tex/pineywoods/upshur/bios.html Past History and Present Stage of Development of Texas, published by Forrister History Company, Chicago (1912). Portal to Texas History (University of North Texas Libraries) A History of Upshur County, Texas, by Doyal T. Loyd, 1966.

In 1898, John Edgar—who had tried to settle in Mesa, Arizona, but had not succeeded—settled near Hopewell in Upshur County. In 1898, Edgar purchased land in what would become Kelsey.

By 1901, there were nine Latter-day Saint families in Kelsey. On August 4, 1901, a Sunday School of the church was organized at Kelsey. This same year, James G. Duffin, president of the Southwest States Mission of the church, received approval from the First Presidency for the building up of this settlement. In 1902, Abraham O. Woodruff and Duffin laid out the townsite for Kelsey.

A post office was established at Kelsey in 1902. By 1906, Kelsey had about 400 inhabitants.

In 1907, the Kelsey School District was formed. In 1911, a two-story brick schoolhouse was built. The first gymnasium in East Texas, named Bennion Hall after mission president Samuel O. Bennion, was completed at Kelsey in 1929.

By 1910 the population had risen to 527. In 1923, the population peaked at 750. Families gathered to Kelsey from throughout the southern United States and even on rare occasions from other parts of the United States.

Kelsey was a stop on the Marshall and East Texas Railway. Kelsey was Milepost 24.8 on the M&ET. The railroad built a branch line to Kelsey to facilitate the loading of such products as strawberries, cantaloupes and corn that were grown in the community.

During the 1930s, Kelsey farmers provided food to the oil workers in Kilgore and Gladewater, Texas. In 1943, the school in Kelsey was closed and after that students were bussed to Gilmer, Texas. In 1951, a new church was built in Kelsey.

== See also ==
- The Church of Jesus Christ of Latter-day Saints in Texas
- Enoch, Texas
