= National Register of Historic Places listings in Upshur County, Texas =

Location of Upshur County in Texas

This is a list of the National Register of Historic Places listings in Upshur County, Texas.

This is intended to be a complete list of properties listed on the National Register of Historic Places in Upshur County, Texas. There are two properties listed on the National Register in the county. One property is also a Recorded Texas Historic Landmark.

This National Park Service list is complete through NPS recent listings posted March 21, 2025.

== Current listings ==
The locations of National Register properties may be seen in a mapping service provided.

	Name on the Register	Image	Date listed	Location	City or town	Description
1	John and Eva O'Bryne House	John and Eva O'Bryne House	May 6, 2005 (#05000383)	FM 1844, 0.7 mi (1.1 km). east of US 271; 32°35′03″N 94°54′36″W	Union Grove	Recorded Texas Historic Landmark
2	Upshur County Courthouse	Upshur County Courthouse	May 16, 2012 (#12000290)	100 W. Tyler St. 32°43′45″N 94°56′40″W	Gilmer	

== See also ==
- National Register of Historic Places listings in Texas
- Recorded Texas Historic Landmarks in Upshur County
