= Elam Springs, Texas =

Historic Texas freedom colony in Upshur County, Texas, United States

Elam Springs, Texas Elam Spring
- Historic African-American freedom colony community
- Interactive map of Elam Springs, Texas
- Coordinates: 32.663375°N 95.099577°W
- Country: United States
- State: Texas
- County: Upshur
- Settled: before 1900

Population (2000)
  - Total: 50
- Time zone: UTC−6 (Central (CST))
  - Summer (DST): UTC−5 (CDT)

Elam Springs (also Elam Spring) is a historic Texas freedom colony in western Upshur County, Texas, United States, located off Farm Road 1795 about ten miles southwest of Gilmer, the county seat. Settled before 1900 by African Americans in the generation after emancipation, Elam Springs developed as one of the more than five hundred rural Black landowning communities of the East Texas Piney Woods — settlements of the type known in Texas as freedom colonies. The community's population was reported as fifty in 2000.

== History ==
Upshur County lay at the western edge of the antebellum cotton South: by 1860 the county's population of 10,645 included 3,794 enslaved people, and after emancipation — proclaimed in Texas on June 19, 1865 (Juneteenth) — most of the county's freedpeople became sharecroppers, while a minority acquired land of their own. Across Texas, clusters of Black landowners of this kind, organized around a church, a school, and a burial ground, formed the hundreds of dispersed rural settlements that historians call freedom colonies.

Elam Springs was settled before 1900, and a school was operating there by that year; in 1906 the school had an enrollment of forty-nine Black students. By the mid-1930s the community had a church and a number of houses. Like most rural Texas freedom colonies, Elam Springs contracted across the mid-twentieth century as residents moved away and rural Black schools were consolidated into town districts; by the mid-1960s it consisted of a church, a cemetery, and a few widely scattered houses. The population was reported as fifty in 2000.

== Geography ==
Elam Springs lies in the pine uplands of western Upshur County, within the Piney Woods region of East Texas, an area of loblolly, shortleaf, and longleaf pine mixed with hardwoods over sandy, acidic soils. The community is dispersed along and off Farm Road 1795 rather than concentrated in a village center, a settlement form typical of the region's rural freedom colonies.

== Elam Springs Cemetery ==
The Elam Springs Cemetery, the community's burial ground, is recorded in the Texas Historical Commission's Texas Historic Sites Atlas among the historic cemeteries of Upshur County. As of the Atlas record consulted, the cemetery had not received the commission's Historic Texas Cemetery designation.

== See also ==
- Freedmen's town
- Summerfield, Upshur County, Texas, a neighboring freedom colony southwest of Gilmer
- List of unincorporated communities in Texas
