= Enon, Upshur County, Texas =

Enon
- Unincorporated community
- Interactive map of Enon
- Location within Texas Enon (the United States)
- Coordinates: 32°46′14″N 95°1′47″W
- Country: United States
- State: Texas
- County: Upshur County

Enon (also referred to as McPeek) is an unincorporated community located on Farm Road 852 in Upshur County, Texas, United States.

== History ==
The community was settled in the 1840s. On May 13, 1848, a church called the Enon Baptist Church was organized and would then become one of the oldest churches in Upshur County. Families began migrating into the community from the 1850s, most of them being from Alabama and Georgia.

A communal post office was established in 1903 and was named McPeek after an early settler in the area, but it then would close in 1905. Several amenities were available in the community during the mid-1930s such as houses, the church, a store, sawmill, a cemetery called the Enon Cemetery, as well as two schools that have a total enrollment of 203.

The majority of Enon's residents moved after World War II ended. Only a few houses, the church and the cemetery remain during the 1960s, and by the 21st century, the population was estimated to be around 204.
