= Enoch, Texas =

Enoch
- Ghost Town
- Location within the state of Texas
- Coordinates: 32°43′07″N 94°59′32″W
- Country: United States
- State: Texas
- County: Upshur

Enoch is an unincorporated community in Upshur County, Texas, United States.

== History ==
Enoch was established by members of the Church of Jesus Christ of Latter-day Saints with Samuel O. Bennion's organization of the Enoch Branch in 1911. The first Latter-day Saint settlers had arrived in 1906. In 1908, a Sunday School was organized at Enoch. In 1910, a building was built for the Sunday School. In 1930, Enoch was only one of eight communities in Texas where the church owned a chapel.

By the mid-1930s, Enoch had one church and two stores. In 1938, it had a population of 250. Dairy farming was the most important economic activity.

In 1951, the school in Enoch was consolidated into the Gilmer Independent School District. In the mid-1960s, there were 125 residents of Enoch. By the 1990s, there were no functioning institutions in Enoch. In 2000, there were 25 inhabitants of Enoch.

In October 1953, when the Dallas Stake was organized, the Enoch Branch was a unit in this stake. In 1958, the area was transferred into the Shreveport Louisiana Stake, and the Kelsey Ward and Enoch branch being merged with the Gilmer branch to form the Kelsey-Gilmer Ward, with J. Wilburn Tefteller, Sr. as bishop. As of 1997, Enoch was part of the Gilmer 2nd Ward. There were three wards in Gilmer.

== See also ==
- The Church of Jesus Christ of Latter-day Saints in Texas
- Kelsey, Texas
