= Ore City, Texas =

- City
- Nicknames: "City on the Iron Hill", “Iron City”, "OC", "Featherstone" (after Lewis P. Featherstone)
- Interactive map of Ore City, Texas
- Location of Ore City in the contiguous United States Ore City, Texas (the United States)
- Coordinates: 32°48′03″N 94°43′05″W
- Country: United States
- State: Texas
- County: Upshur
- Incorporated: 1951; 75 years ago
- Founder: Lewis Porter Featherstone
- Named for: the iron discovered

Government
  - Type: Strong Mayor-council
  - Mayor: Angela Edwards

Area
  - Total: 2.18 sq mi (5.65 km^{2})
  - Land: 2.16 sq mi (5.59 km^{2})
  - Water: 0.023 sq mi (0.06 km^{2})
- Elevation: 308 ft (94 m)

Population (2020)
  - Total: 1,108
  - Density: 568.7/sq mi (219.56/km^{2})
- Demonym: Ore Citian
- Time zone: Central (CST)
- ZIP code: 75683
- Area codes: 903, 430
- FIPS code: 48-54216
- GNIS feature ID: 2411331
- Website: orecitytx.org

Ore City is a city in Upshur County, Texas, United States, located where US 259 and FM 450 converge, just four miles below the Lake O’ the Pines. The population was 1,108 at the 2020 census.

== Geography ==
Ore City is situated about 13 miles northeast of Gilmer at the junction of U.S. Highway 259 and FM 450, 20 miles north of Longview, Texas.

Four miles north of Ore City is Lake O' the Pines

Ore City is part of a larger area known as the East Texas, Piney Woods. The city and the surrounding area boast several impressive specimens.

According to the United States Census Bureau, the city has a total area of 2.3 mi^{2} (5.9 km^{2}), of which 2.3 mi^{2} (5.9 km^{2}) are land and 0.04 mi^{2} (0.1 km^{2}) (0.88%) is water.

=== Major highways ===
- Highway 259

== History ==
Before any settlement, the indigenous Caddo were the dominant people living within the region and on the land.

The arrival of European settlers in the 18th and 19th centuries led to significant changes in the region, including the forced removal of the Indigenous peoples.

Originally part of the William Murray League, the area was first settled in the early 1850s by a group from Haywood County, Tennessee. They immediately started The Murray League Methodist Episcopal Church, South as well as the Murray League Institute. After the Civil War, rich iron ore deposits were discovered in the area, and ore was mined sporadically from the 1860s through 1900.

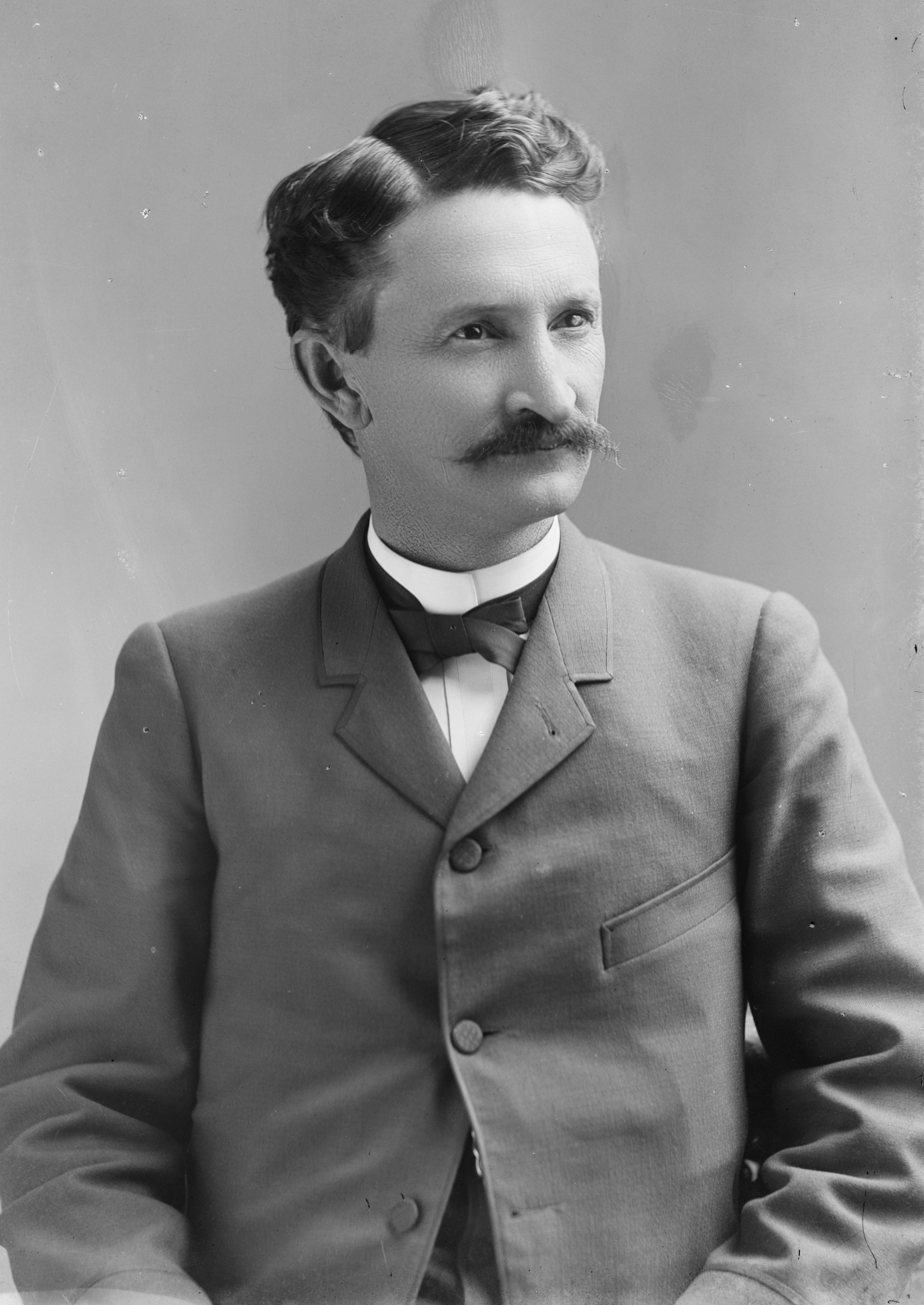
U.S. Representative, L.P. Featherstone

Around 1910, a commercial company was formed to mine ore in the East Texas Iron Ore Belt led by Colonel L.P. Featherstone, a former U.S. Congressman from Arkansas. He persuaded the Santa Fe Railway line to finance a rail link with Port Bolivar. Land for a new city was purchased and platted into streets and lots around 1911. The town was named Ore City, and a post office was established soon after. By 1914, 30 miles of the line known as the Port Bolivar Iron Ore Railway had been built, connecting Ore City with Longview. The newly founded community had an estimated population of 400. Further construction on the railroad line was halted by the outbreak of World War I. Colonel Featherstone's company went into bankruptcy, and the rail line was abandoned in 1927. Ore City survived, and by 1936, around 500 people lived in the community. During World War II, the federal government built a steel plant 10 miles north of Ore City to mine the same ore that previously brought Colonel Featherstone to the area. The plant was completed just as the war ended and was sold to a Texas group as surplus property. They operated it as the Lone Star Steel Company.

Ore City was incorporated in 1951. At that time, the number of residents had fallen to 385.

Growth resumed in the mid-1960s, and by 1976, Ore City had a population of 900 and 34 businesses. More than 1,000 people lived in the city by the year 2000.

=== Decline and Stabilization ===
As in many other mining towns, resource depletion led to population decline and economic stagnation. By the mid-20th century, mining operations had slowed considerably, and Ore City's growth stabilized as a small, rural community, falling short of becoming a potential Boomtown.

== Demographics ==
Historical population
Census	Pop.	Note	%±
1960	819		—
1970	830		1.3%
1980	1,050		26.5%
1990	898		−14.5%
2000	1,106		23.2%
2010	1,144		3.4%
2020	1,108		−3.1%
U.S. Decennial Census

=== 2020 census ===
As of the 2020 census, Ore City had a population of 1,108. The median age was 35.5 years. 29.8% of residents were under the age of 18, and 13.7% of residents were 65 years of age or older. For every 100 females there were 94.7 males, and for every 100 females age 18 and over there were 95.5 males age 18 and over.

0.0% of residents lived in urban areas, while 100.0% lived in rural areas.

There were 405 households in Ore City, of which 43.7% had children under the age of 18 living in them. Of all households, 47.4% were married-couple households, 18.0% were households with a male householder and no spouse or partner present, and 27.2% were households with a female householder and no spouse or partner present. About 22.5% of all households were made up of individuals, and 7.9% had someone living alone who was 65 years of age or older.

There were 445 housing units, of which 9.0% were vacant. The homeowner vacancy rate was 4.0%, and the rental vacancy rate was 5.1%.

Racial composition as of the 2020 census
Race	Number	Percent
White	798	72.0%
Black or African American	70	6.3%
American Indian and Alaska Native	20	1.8%
Asian	6	0.5%
Native Hawaiian and Other Pacific Islander	0	0.0%
Some other race	85	7.7%
Two or more races	129	11.6%
Hispanic or Latino (of any race)	191	17.2%

=== 2000 census ===
At the 2000 census, 1,106 people, 403 households, and 295 families resided there. At that time the population density was 490.4 inhabitants per square mile (189.3/km^{2}). The 432 housing units averaged 191.5 per square mile (73.8/km^{2}). The racial makeup of the city was predominantly White, comprising 68.41% of the population. Black or African Americans made up 6.05%, while Native Americans or Alaska Natives accounted for 1.81%. Asians accounted for 0.54%, and those identifying as Mixed or Multiracial accounted for 5.96%. Additionally, Hispanic or Latino individuals comprised 17.24% of the population.

Of the 403 households, 37.2% had children under the age of 18 living with them, 57.3% were married couples living together, 13.4% had a female householder with no husband present, and 26.6% were not families. About 22.6% of all households were made up of individuals, and 10.9% had someone living alone who was 65 years of age or older. The average household size was 2.74, and the average family size was 3.23.

In the city, the population was distributed as follows: 31.8% under 18, 8.7% from 18 to 24, 28.0% from 25 to 44, 18.1% from 45 to 64, and 13.4% who were 65 years of age or older. The median age was 32 years. For every 100 females, there were 89.1 males. For every 100 females age 18 and over, there were 86.6 males age 18 and over. The median household income in the city was $33,542, and the median family income was $37,750. Males had a median income of $28,250 versus $18,333 for females. The per capita income for the city was $15,997. About 17.2% of families and 22.4% of the population were below the poverty line, including 32.5% of those under age 18 and 18.0% of those age 65 or over.

== Culture ==
=== Juneteenth ===
Juneteenth—also known as "Freedom Day"—is the annual commemoration of the emancipation and the freeing of African Americans from slavery through the end of the Civil War, first observed in Texas on June 19, 1865. In Ore City, the observance is recognized by municipal and local institutions as a civic holiday.

The City of Ore City officially observes Juneteenth by closing City Hall, municipal offices, and the First National Bank branch on June 19 each year.

While no large-scale public festival in Ore City has been widely reported, the comprehensive closure of government and essential services underscores a serious civic acknowledgment of the holiday’s importance to the local community. This aligns with broader efforts across Texas to recognize Juneteenth as both a federal and state holiday.

Ore City’s practice of closing government offices reflects a growing recognition of Juneteenth's cultural significance, marking it as an institutionalized day of reflection, celebration, and community solidarity.

== Sports ==
=== Battle of 259 ===
Ore City's rivalry game with Diana

== Economy ==
Ore City, Texas, part of the Longview metropolitan area, has an economy that's traditionally tied to its small-town roots in agriculture, timber, and tourism related to nearby Lake O' the Pines. Located in East Texas and near the more developed regions of Longview and Marshall, Ore City is relatively modest in scale and maintains a completely rural economic profile. It doesn't experience the industrial or tech-driven growth seen in larger Texas cities but is more reliant on local businesses, agriculture, and nearby employment centers.

During the iron boom in the late 19th and early 20th centuries, Ore City had a prime opportunity to diversify its economy but ultimately struggled to do so. The town's economy relied heavily on the iron industry, and the discovery of nearby iron ore led to a surge in mining and related activities. However, this boom didn't last long, and local economic strategies were almost entirely focused on exploiting this one resource, with limited investment in other sectors such as infrastructure, services, or secondary industries that could support long-term economic stability.

One major issue was that Ore City lacked the transportation and logistics infrastructure to support broader industrial diversification. Without significant rail connections or investment in better roads, it was challenging to attract new industries to the area. As a result, when the iron ore deposits began to dwindle or became too costly to extract, the town found itself with limited economic fallback options.

Furthermore, the town's reliance on iron prevented it from developing the agricultural or manufacturing industries that nearby regions were investing in. Many residents, whose livelihoods depended on mining, faced unemployment and hardship as demand for local iron faded. Without significant efforts to diversify, Ore City was left vulnerable to economic downturns, a trend that continues to impact its economic development today.

== Government ==
=== State government ===
Ore City is represented in the Texas Senate by Republican Bryan Hughes, District 1, and in the Texas House of Representatives by Republican Cole Hefner, District 5.

=== Federal Government ===
At the federal level, the two U.S. senators from Texas are Republicans John Cornyn and Ted Cruz. Ore City is part of Texas's 5th congressional district, which is currently represented by Republican Lance Gooden.

== Education ==
Ore City ISD has a complex history with Confederate imagery; the former Confederate soldier mascot was replaced by a pirate to represent a rebel identity, removing all controversial imagery of the Confederate mascot.

Ore City and the surrounding area are served by the Ore City Independent School District.

== Media ==
=== Radio ===
KAZE (106.9) plays Hip-Hop

== Notable people ==
- Chubby Grigg, NFL Tackle, businessman
- Montana Jordan, television actor
- Walter McAfee, astronomer and physicist
- Chad Stanley, NFL player
