= Samuel Bennion =

Samuel Bennion may refer to:

- Sam Bennion (1871–1941), English footballer and later chairman of Port Vale
- Samuel O. Bennion (1874–1946), member of the First Council of the Seventy of The Church of Jesus Christ of Latter-day Saints
