= Chad Stanley =

American football player (born 1976)

No. 4, 7
- Position: Punter

Personal information
- Born: January 29, 1976 (age 50); Ore City, Texas, U.S.
- Listed height: 6 ft 3 in (1.91 m)
- Listed weight: 209 lb (95 kg)

Career information
- High school: Ore City
- College: Kilgore (1994–1995), Stephen F. Austin (1996–1998)
- NFL draft: 1999: undrafted

Career history
- San Francisco 49ers (1999–2000); Arizona Cardinals (2001); Houston Texans (2002–2006); Indianapolis Colts (2008)*
- * Offseason or practice squad member only

Awards and highlights
- NFL record: Most punts in a season: 114 (2002; tied with Bob Parsons)

Career NFL statistics
- Punts: 594
- Punt yards: 24,123
- Average punt: 40.6
- Longest punt: 70
- Stats at Pro Football Reference

Benjamin Chadwick Stanley (born January 29, 1976) is an American former professional football player who was a punter in the National Football League (NFL). He played college football at Kilgore College before transferring to Stephen F. Austin State University. He was signed by the San Francisco 49ers as an undrafted free agent in 1999.

Stanley was also a member of the Arizona Cardinals, Houston Texans and Indianapolis Colts.

== Early life ==
Stanley attended Ore City High School in Ore City, Texas, and was a letterwinner in football, basketball, baseball, and track. In football, he won All-District honors at punter.

== Professional career ==
Stanley was not drafted by the National Football League but was signed by the San Francisco 49ers in 1999. He remained with that team for two years before moving to the Arizona Cardinals for a year and then to Houston to be the starter for the expansion team, the Houston Texans. Until Andre Johnson was named Offensive Player of the Week for Week 4 of the 2006 NFL season, Stanley was the only Texans player to ever be named Player of the Week.

== Achievements ==
Stanley's most notable achievement is the NFL record for most punts in a season at 114.

== Post-football career ==
Stanley is, since November 2010, the Director of Development at KVNE in Tyler, Texas.
