= Diana, Texas =

Unincorporated community in Texas, US

Coordinates: 32°42′36″N 94°45′08″W

Diana is an unincorporated community in Upshur County, Texas, United States. The community is north of Longview and south of Ore City on U.S. Highway 259.

The community of Diana is made up of many smaller communities; Ashland, James, Diana, Graceton, Stamps, Sand Hill, Valley View, and part of Snow Hill. It was considered New Diana until the late 1990s. Most postal services recognized the city as New Diana as well as the school and other businesses.

The New Diana Independent School District was formed by consolidating local schools and is located at the intersection of U.S. Highway 154 and U.S. Highway 259. At the time the school was formed, many students did not have the opportunity to receive a high school education, as after grammar school they went to work at the local cotton and lumber industries. Stamps did not want to consolidate with the newly formed New Diana ISD, but later was forced to do so and Valley View School did not consolidate until the 1970s, during integration. The original location of Diana is said to be further north of U.S. Highways 154 and U.S. Highway 259 at the intersection of U.S. Highway 726 and U.S. Highway 259. The ZIP Code for Diana is 75640

Sometimes the community of Diana is incorrectly referred to as New Diana, the local independent school district's name. The mascot of New Diana ISD is the Eagle. While the population of Diana is unknown due to unincorporation, the school district itself is classified as a 3A by Texas guidelines. New Diana ISD receives quite a few transfers from neighboring towns and cities however due to their stellar reputation in sports and academics. New Diana High Schools' longest and most intense rival is its nearest neighbor, the Ore City Rebels.

The community's main employment opportunities still include the school, some restaurants, churches, and convenience stores. Most of the population commutes to Longview, Gilmer, or other nearby cities for employment. Longtime residents generally have substantial property tied to agricultural and recreational usage. Recent land developments offer myriad small lots and new homes to residents moving to the community from larger nearby cities.
