= New Diana High School =

Location
- 11826 State Highway 154 East; Diana, Texas 75640-0026; United States; 32.708257°N 94.750568°W

Information
- School type: Public high school
- School district: New Diana Independent School District
- Principal: John Gross
- Staff: 24.09 (FTE)
- Grades: 9-12
- Enrollment: 330 (2024-2025)
- Student to teacher ratio: 13.70
- Colors: Blue and gold
- Athletics conference: UIL Class 3A
- Nickname: Eagles
- Website: New Diana High School

New Diana High School is a public high school located in the unincorporated community of Diana, Texas in Upshur County, United States and classified as a 3A school by the UIL. It is a part of the New Diana Independent School District located in eastern Upshur County. In 2013, the school was rated "Met Standard" by the Texas Education Agency.

== Athletics ==
The New Diana Eagles compete in these sports

- Baseball
- Basketball
- Cross Country
- Football
- Soccer
- Golf
- Powerlifting
- Softball
- Tennis
- Track and Field
- Volleyball

=== State Titles ===
- One Act Play
  - 1996(2A), 1999(2A), 2000(2A), 2004(2A)

UIL Texas State Marching Band Contest Finialists 2013(2A) 2017(3A)

2015-2016 TMEA 3A Honor Band

2017-2018 Sweepstakes Band
