= Summerfield, Upshur County, Texas =

Historic Texas freedom colony community in Upshur County, Texas, United States

Summerfield, Texas
- Historic Texas (historic freedom colony)
- Interactive map of Summerfield, Texas
- Coordinates: 32.7201356°N 95.0260515°W
- Country: United States
- State: Texas
- County: Upshur
- Established: late 19th century
- Time zone: UTC−6 (Central (CST))
  - Summer (DST): UTC−5 (CDT)

Summerfield is a historic Texas freedom colony in western Upshur County, Texas, United States, on Farm Road 49 about six miles southwest of Gilmer, the county seat. Established toward the end of the nineteenth century as a predominantly Black community of the East Texas Piney Woods, Summerfield was one of the rural landowning settlements founded by formerly enslaved people and their descendants that historians of Texas call freedom colonies. The settlement declined after the Second World War, but its community cemetery has continued to receive burials into the twenty-first century and remains the principal surviving landmark — and the most extensive surviving public record — of the community.

== History ==
=== Emancipation-era context ===
Upshur County lay within the cotton-plantation belt of antebellum East Texas; by 1860 its population of 10,645 included 3,794 enslaved people. Emancipation was proclaimed in Texas on June 19, 1865 (Juneteenth). In the decades that followed, most of the county's freedpeople worked as sharecroppers, while a minority acquired land of their own; across the state, such clusters of Black landowners — organized around a church, a school, and a burial ground — formed the dispersed rural settlements known as freedom colonies.

=== The community ===
Summerfield was established toward the end of the nineteenth century. A school was in operation by the mid-1890s, and in 1896 it had an enrollment of forty-three Black students. By the mid-1930s the predominantly Black community consisted of a church, a school, and a number of houses.

The community cemetery preserves the names of Summerfield's founding generation, including several residents born under slavery. The gravestone transcription made in 1999 for the Upshur County Historical Commission records a woman identified only as "Lizzie E.," who died in February 1895 at the age of ninety-four — placing her birth around 1801 — as well as William Youmans (February 5, 1844 – August 15, 1908), Victoria Odom (died 1905, aged 52, born about 1853), Sophie Stephenson (died 1913, aged 52, born about 1861), and Emma Andres (born December 25, 1862), all born before emancipation, alongside a cohort born in its immediate aftermath, including Henry Stephenson (born 1865), Mattie Jackson (born 1868), and Eliza Grundy (born January 1869). The transcribers cautioned that the record is necessarily incomplete: many graves in the area's cemeteries, particularly the oldest, are marked only with plain iron-ore stones, have sunken or weathered markers, or are entirely unmarked.

=== Decline ===
After the Second World War many residents moved away, and the Summerfield school was consolidated into the Gilmer school district. By the mid-1960s all that remained of the settlement was a few scattered houses. The community's dispersal followed the broader mid-twentieth-century pattern of out-migration and school consolidation that reduced most of the Texas freedom colonies. The USGS records Summerfield as an unincorporated populated place that never had its own post office.

== Summerfield Community Cemetery ==
The Summerfield Community Cemetery lies off Farm Road 49 on Elderberry Road, about three miles west of Gilmer, at 32°43′12″N 95°1′33″W; the Upshur County cemetery index records it as an African-American cemetery. The cemetery was read and transcribed on October 13, 1999, by Ida and Billy Ray Hollis and Mary Jones, and submitted by the Upshur County Historical Commission, with headstone photographs by Jo Gina Dickerson; the transcription, comprising roughly two hundred entries and subsequently updated with later interments, linked obituaries, and death certificates, constitutes the community's most extensive surviving public record. The cemetery is recorded in the Texas Historical Commission's Texas Historic Sites Atlas among the historic cemeteries of Upshur County. It is one of more than two dozen African-American cemeteries recorded in the county's cemetery index — a register that maps the network of Black settlements and freedom colonies around Gilmer, including neighboring Elam Springs.

=== Families ===
The surnames most numerous in the transcription — Hagler (recorded in four spellings: Hagler, Heagler, Hegler, and Heguler), Stephenson, Cuba, Odom, Mathis, Jones, Brooks, Darden, Wright, Brewer, Jeffery, Byas, and Allen — indicate the interrelated landowning families around which the community formed. Married-name inscriptions such as Corine Heagler Mathis, Ola Cuba Bowser, Era Odom Jones, Viola Brooks Darden, Olivera Wright Johnson, and Luevera Hagler Luster, together with shared stones such as that of Sie Henry Jones (1874–1950) and Emma Brewer (1879–1937), record extensive intermarriage among the families. The stones also record notable longevity among the community's elders, including two near- or full centenarians: JoAnna Allen (March 26, 1885 – August 3, 1985) and Luther Brooks Sr. (August 29, 1895 – October 9, 1996), a First World War veteran who lived to 101.

=== Military service ===
The cemetery's markers, as transcribed in the 1999 reading, record military service across every major American conflict of the twentieth century. First World War stones include privates of the segregated labor units of the era — Bennie Odom of the 412th Labor Battalion, Quartermaster Corps, and Lee Darden of the 445th Reserve Labor Battalion — alongside Tommie Allen and Andrew Heagler of the 20th Engineers. More than twenty Second World War veterans are marked across the community's families, in the Army, Navy, and Naval Reserve, among them Joe Berry Byas of the 777th Field Artillery Battalion and Plez Heagler of the 1890th Engineer Aviation Battalion, both segregated Black units, and the brothers-in-arms of the Cuba, Hagler, Jones, Stephenson, Odom, Mathis, Griffin, and Brooks families. Korean and Vietnam War service is also recorded, including Master Sergeant Collie Jones (Second World War and Korea) and Staff Sergeant Russell L. Brooks of the Air Force (Korea and Vietnam).

One marker, for Richard J. Mathews (July 28, 1931 – September 8, 1950), is transcribed "TX PFC 24 Inf 25 Inf Korea PH" — a reading consistent with service as a private first class in the 24th Infantry Regiment, one of the last segregated Black regiments of the U.S. Army, then attached to the 25th Infantry Division in Korea, with a Purple Heart; Mathews died at nineteen during the fighting of the war's first summer.

=== Continuing use ===
Burials recorded in the transcription and its updates continue into the twenty-first century, with obituary-linked interments through the 2000s and the latest marked interment noted in 2012; the cemetery remains the community's active point of return for descendants.

== The other Summerfield ==
A second, unrelated community named Summerfield existed in the same region of northeast Texas: an antebellum white farming settlement west of Airline Road in what is now Judson, in northeastern Gregg County, named for its Methodist Episcopal congregation and absorbed into Judson after its school closed around 1900. That community — associated with the planter and state legislator Bluford Washington Brown, who is buried in Greenwood Cemetery in Longview — predates the Civil War and is distinct from the post-emancipation Black freedom colony near Gilmer; the two have sometimes been conflated in popular compilations.

== See also ==
- Freedmen's town
- Elam Springs, Texas, a neighboring historic Black community of western Upshur County
- List of unincorporated communities in Texas
