= Josh Reynolds (baseball) =

American baseball player & coach (born 1979)

Current position
- Title: Pitching coach
- Team: Tennessee
- Conference: SEC

Biographical details
- Born: September 27, 1979 (age 47); Jefferson City, Missouri, U.S.

Playing career
- 1998–2000: Central Missouri
- 2000: Pittsfield Mets
- 2001–2002: St. Lucie Mets
- 2002–2003: Lake Elsinore Storm
- 2003: Sarasota Red Sox
- Position: Pitcher

Coaching career (HC unless noted)
- 2004–2006: Kansas State (GA)
- 2007: Northeast Texas CC (P)
- 2009–2010: Evansville (P)
- 2011–2015: Kansas State (P)
- 2016–2021: Northwestern (P)
- 2021–2022: Northwestern (Interim HC)
- 2024: Cincinnati (P)
- 2025-present: Tennessee (DBO/PP, AC)

Head coaching record
- Overall: 27–32
- Tournaments: NCAA: 0–0

Accomplishments and honors

Awards
- MIAA Freshman of the Year (1998); Second Team All-MIAA (1998); 2× First Team All-MIAA (1999, 2000); MIAA MVP (2000); Second Team All-American (1999); First Team All-American (2000)

Joshua George Reynolds (born September 27, 1979) is an American baseball coach and former pitcher, who is a current assistant coach for the Tennessee Volunteers. He played college baseball at Central Missouri from 1998 to 2000, before playing professionally from 2000–2003. He then served as the head coach of the Northwestern Wildcats (2022). He spent the 2024 season as the pitching coach for the Cincinnati Bearcats. In 2025, Reynolds spent the season as Tennessee's Director of Baseball Operations and Pitching Performance before getting promoted to assistant coach the following season.

== Playing career ==
Reynolds attended and played college baseball at the University of Central Missouri. As a freshman, Reynolds was a second team All-Mid-America Intercollegiate Athletics Association (MIAA) selection and was named the Conference's Freshman of the Year. As a sophomore in 1999, he led the Mules in wins (11), strikeouts (67) and innings pitched (87.0), on his way to being named First Team All-MIAA. Reynolds turned in his best season of his college career in 2000, registering 12 wins in 97.0 innings. His efforts during the 2000 season earned him the MIAA MVP.

Reynolds was selected in the 3rd round of the 2000 Major League Baseball draft by the New York Mets. He decided to forgo his senior season and sign with the Mets, who assigned him to the Pittsfield Mets. Reynolds finished the season with a 1-1 record and a 4.39 ERA. Reynolds pitched for the St. Lucie Mets of the Class A-Advanced Florida State League in 2001, finishing the year with a 4.95 ERA in 11 games started. In 2002, he began the season with St. Lucie, but was traded on July 31, along with Jason Bay and Bobby Jones to the San Diego Padres for Steve Reed and Jason Middlebrook. The Padres assigned him to the Lake Elsinore Storm, he finished the season with a 14-7 record and a 3.79 ERA in 23 starts. He would spend the 2003 season split between the Lake Elsinore Storm and the Sarasota Red Sox, posting a 4.07 ERA in 26 games, mostly a reliever.

== Coaching career ==
Reynolds decided to give up playing, and took a graduate assistant job with the Kansas State Wildcats. After three years at Kansas State, he joined the coaching staff of Northeast Texas Community College as their pitching coach. After just a single season with Northeast Texas, he joined the coaching staff of the Evansville Purple Aces. Reynolds made his return to Kansas State in 2011, this time as the pitching coach. In 2016, Reynolds was named the pitching coach of the Northwestern Wildcats.

On May 31, 2021, Reynolds was named the interim head coach for the Wildcats.

== Head coaching record ==
Record table
Season	Team	Overall	Conference	Standing	Postseason
Northwestern Wildcats (Big Ten Conference) (2021–2022)
2021	Northwestern	3–5	3–5		
2022	Northwestern	24–27	10–14		
Northwestern:		27-32	13–19		
Total:		27-32			
National champion Postseason invitational champion Conference regular season champion Conference regular season and conference tournament champion Division regular season champion Division regular season and conference tournament champion Conference tournament champion
