= East Texas iron ore belt =

Region in East Texas

The East Texas iron ore belt refers to a significant region in East Texas characterized by the presence of iron ore deposits, primarily associated with the Weches greensand formation. This area has historical importance in the mining industry, contributing to the supply of iron ore in the United States. Although many counties in this region have reported the presence of iron ore, the actual commercially viable deposits are limited.

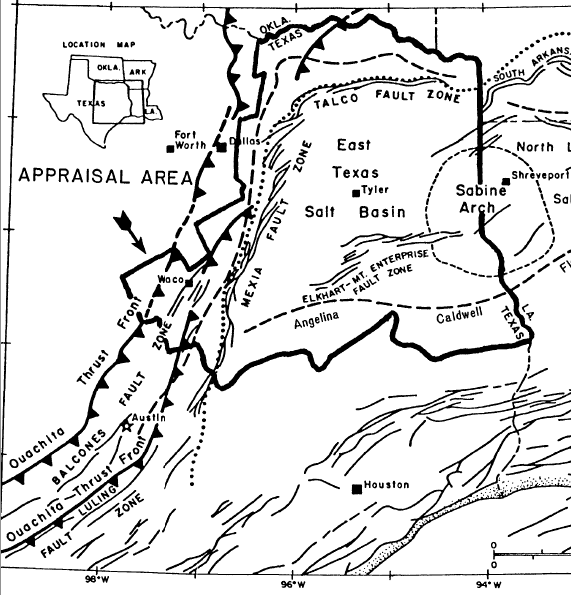
East Texas Basin geological map

== Geology and geography ==
The East Texas iron ore belt spans several counties, including Cherokee, Upshur, Camp, Gregg, Harrison, and others. The geology of the region is dominated by the Weches greensand, which consists of glauconitic sand and clay. This greensand is underlain by various sedimentary formations, including the Queen City sand member and the Sparta sand. The iron ore is typically found in the form of limonite, concretions, or thin lenticular beds within the greensand.

The area's topography is varied, featuring rolling hills and rugged outliers of greensand that rise significantly above the surrounding terrain. Many of these outliers are capped with ferruginous sandstone, which complicates extraction efforts. The elevation in some areas can reach up to 350 feet above sea level.

== Historical context ==
The East Texas iron ore belt has a history of mining dating back to the 19th century. The region was known for supplying iron ore to local furnaces, notably the Loo Ellen furnace at Kelleyville, which relied heavily on the output from the old mines in the area. Over the years, several mines were established, although many have since fallen into disuse.

Historically, the deposits in this region were of interest due to their potential for iron production. However, as industrial needs and mining technologies evolved, many smaller and less commercially viable deposits were abandoned.

== Notable deposits ==
=== Cherokee County ===
In northeastern Cherokee County, the Weches greensand is prominently exposed, though the iron ore deposits are generally thin, with maximum thicknesses around 10 inches. Structural features in this area are noteworthy, but overall, the potential for significant iron ore reserves is limited.

=== Upshur County ===
Upshur County lies at the divide between the North Basin and South Basin of the East Texas iron ore belt. The Weches greensand here shows variations in character, with some areas displaying non-fossiliferous and soft glauconitic sands. While there are indications of iron ore in the form of small concretions, the quantities are insufficient for commercial extraction.

The northeastern part of Upshur County features outliers of Weches greensand that rise steeply from the surrounding landscape. These outliers can contain substantial quantities of laminated ore, but many deposits are small and scattered, limiting their commercial viability.

=== Harrison County ===
Harrison County's Reklaw member of the Mount Selman formation contains ferruginous deposits, with some high-grade limonite. However, like other areas, these deposits typically consist of small concretions or thin beds, making large-scale mining operations impractical.

=== Other Counties ===
Counties such as Camp, Gregg, and Smith also show the presence of iron ore deposits, though many are deemed too small or inaccessible for profitable mining. Reconnaissance surveys have indicated that while iron minerals exist in these counties, the feasibility of commercial production is low.

In Smith County, the Weches greensand covers a significant portion of the area, but most of the iron ore beds are either missing or too thin to be economically viable. Some localized deposits have been identified, but their overall potential remains uncertain.
