= Robert N. McClelland =

American surgeon (1929–2019)

Robert Nelson McClelland (November 20, 1929 – September 10, 2019) was an American surgeon. On November 22, 1963, he worked unsuccessfully to save the life of U.S. President John F. Kennedy after he was fatally shot, and two days later, the life of Kennedy's assassin, Lee Harvey Oswald.

== Early life and education ==
Robert Nelson McClelland was born on November 20, 1929, in Gilmer, Texas. His father, Robert, was a butcher, and his mother, Verna McClelland née Nelson, worked for a federal relief agency. He graduated from University of Texas at Austin in 1950 and University of Texas Medical Branch in 1954.

== Career ==
McClelland was a medical officer in the United States Air Force for two years and was stationed overseas in Germany for a time. After completing a residency at Parkland Memorial Hospital, he was hired as a faculty member at the University of Texas Southwestern Medical Center. His specialty was in surgery related to the liver, pancreas, and biliary tract.

In 1974, McClelland created and was the first editor for the very successful Selected Readings in General Surgery, aiming to present to students and surgeons the most useful of medical-journal articles, now published by the American College of Surgeons. After 45 years on the faculty at Southwestern Medical Center, McClelland retired in August 2007. In September 2007, he was appointed Professor Emeritus of Surgery at the UT Southwestern Medical Center, remaining involved in medical-student education.

=== Assassination of John F. Kennedy and aftermath ===
On November 22, 1963, McClelland was working at Parkland Memorial Hospital in Dallas, Texas, when President John F. Kennedy was brought in grievously injured. Despite the efforts of the three attending surgeons, McClelland, Malcolm Perry, and Charles R. Baxter, he died shortly after arriving. McClelland supported the idea that Kennedy had been shot from the front, thus the idea that there was a second gunman. McClelland was called to testify to the Warren Commission, he described the "posterior portion of the skull" as "extremely blasted". He said the wound was such that "you could actually look down into the skull cavity itself and see probably a third or so, at least, of the brain tissue".

In 1988 he made an appearance in the documentary The Men Who Killed Kennedy. He was also interviewed for the 1992 documentary The JFK Assassination: The Jim Garrison Tapes and for the 2023 documentary JFK: What the Doctors Saw. He was portrayed by Joseph Nadell in the film JFK (1991).

Two days later, McClelland saw on the news that Kennedy's assassin Lee Harvey Oswald had been shot. McClelland immediately went back to the hospital. Along with Tom Shires, McClelland worked unsuccessfully to save Oswald's life, as he was pronounced dead two hours after being shot. McClelland preserved his blood-stained shirt from attempting to save President Kennedy for the rest of his life.

== Personal life and death ==
McClelland married Connie Logan in May 1958. She was the head nurse at Parkland Memorial Hospital, and the two also attended the same church. They had two daughters and a son. McClelland enjoyed reading, and insisted on having a bookcase in every room of his house.

McClelland died from kidney failure on September 10, 2019, at an assisted living facility in Dallas. He was 89.

== Honors ==
In 1990, McClelland became the namesake for the Parkland Surgical Society's Robert N. McClelland Lectureship.
