= Chilton Jennings =

African-American man lynched in the U.S.

Lynching of Chilton Jennings
- Part of Red Summer
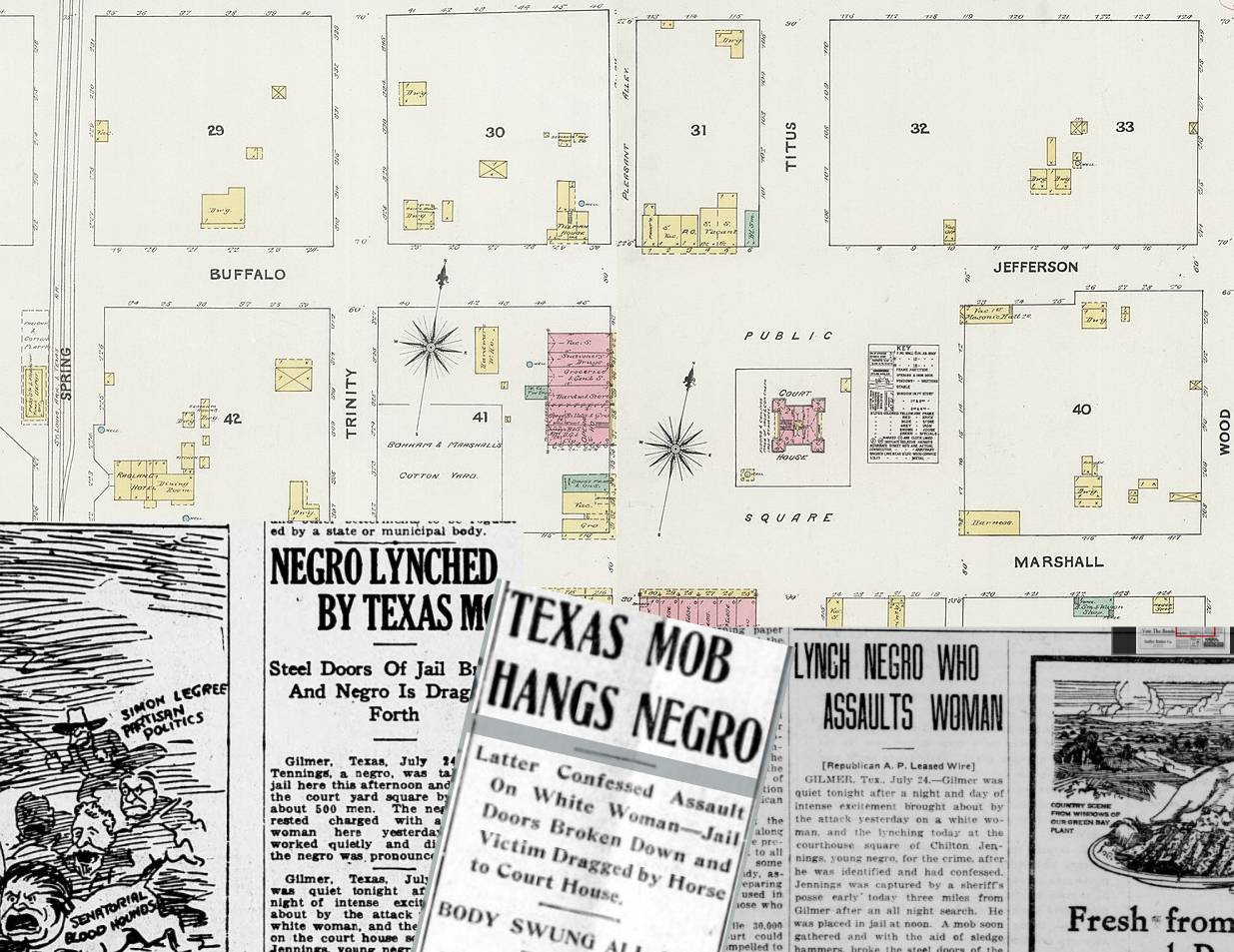
- National news coverage of the Jennings lynching
- Date: July 24, 1919
- Location: Gilmer, Texas
- Participants: White mob in Gilmer, Texas
- Deaths: 1

Chilton Jennings was lynched on July 24, 1919, after being accused of attacking a white woman, Mrs. Virgie Haggard in Gilmer, Texas.

== Lynching of Chilton Jennings ==
In Gilmer, Upshur County, Texas, 28-year-old Chilton Jennings allegedly assaulted a white woman, Mrs. Virgie Haggard, leaving her in critical condition. A posse caught him 3 miles (4.8 km) from Glimer. He was arrested and a mob of about 1,000 white people stormed the jail and broke down the door with sledgehammers. A noose was placed around his neck and he was dragged by horse to the town square where he was hanged. The mob worked quietly and quickly dispersed after he was killed. The body hung all day before being cut down at 4 o'clock July 25. Four people were later arrested for the lynching; murder indictments were served for Willie Howell, Charlie Lansdale, Fritz Boyd, and Francis Flanagan.

== Aftermath ==
These race riots were one of several incidents of civil unrest that began in the so-called American Red Summer of 1919, which included terrorist attacks on black communities and white oppression in over three dozen cities and counties. In most cases, white mobs attacked African American neighborhoods. In some cases, black community groups resisted the attacks, especially in Chicago and Washington DC. Most deaths occurred in rural areas during events like the Elaine massacre in Arkansas, where an estimated 100 to 240 black people and 5 white people were killed. Also in 1919 were the Chicago Race Riot and Washington D.C. race riot which killed 38 and 39 people respectively. Both had many more non-fatal injuries and extensive property damage reaching into the millions of dollars.

== See also ==
- Red Summer
- Texarkana, Texas riot of 1919
- Port Arthur riot 1919
- Longview race riot

== Bibliography ==
Notes

References

- "Lunch Negro Who Assaults Woman". Arizona Republican. Phoenix, Maricopa, Arizona: Republican Pub. Co. July 25, 1919. pp. 1–20. ISSN 2157-135X. OCLC 2612512.
- "Negro Lynched by Texas Mob". Grand Forks Herald. Grand Forks, North Dakota: Grand Forks Herald Co. 2020. pp. 1–10. ISSN 2379-1209. OCLC 12360797.
- Herald Democrat (July 25, 1919). "Teas mob hangs Negro". The Herald Democrat. Leadville, Colorado.
- Richmond Times-Dispatch (August 3, 1919). "Four Held In Lynching". Richmond Times-Dispatch. Richmond, Virginia: Times Dispatch Pub. Co. pp. 1–54. ISSN 2333-7761. OCLC 9493729.
- The New York Times (October 5, 1919). "For Action on Race Riot Peril". The New York Times. New York, NY. ISSN 1553-8095. OCLC 1645522.
