= Mission (LDS Church) =

Geographical administrative area within the LDS Church

A mission of the Church of Jesus Christ of Latter-day Saints (LDS Church) is a geographical administrative area to which church missionaries are assigned. Almost all areas of the world are within the boundaries of an LDS Church mission, whether or not any of the church's missionaries live or proselytize in the area. As of December 2025, there were 451 missions of the church.

== Administrative structure ==
Many LDS missions have logos or seals. This was the seal of the Arizona Tucson Mission from 2002 to 2005.

Geographically, a mission may be a city, a city and surrounding areas, a state or province, or perhaps an entire country or even multiple countries. Typically, the name of the mission is the name of the country (or state in the United States), and then the name of the city where the mission headquarters office is located. New missionaries receive a formal mission call, assigning them to a particular mission for the duration of their two years or eighteen months of service. Each mission has, on average, about 150 missionaries serving there.

=== Mission president ===
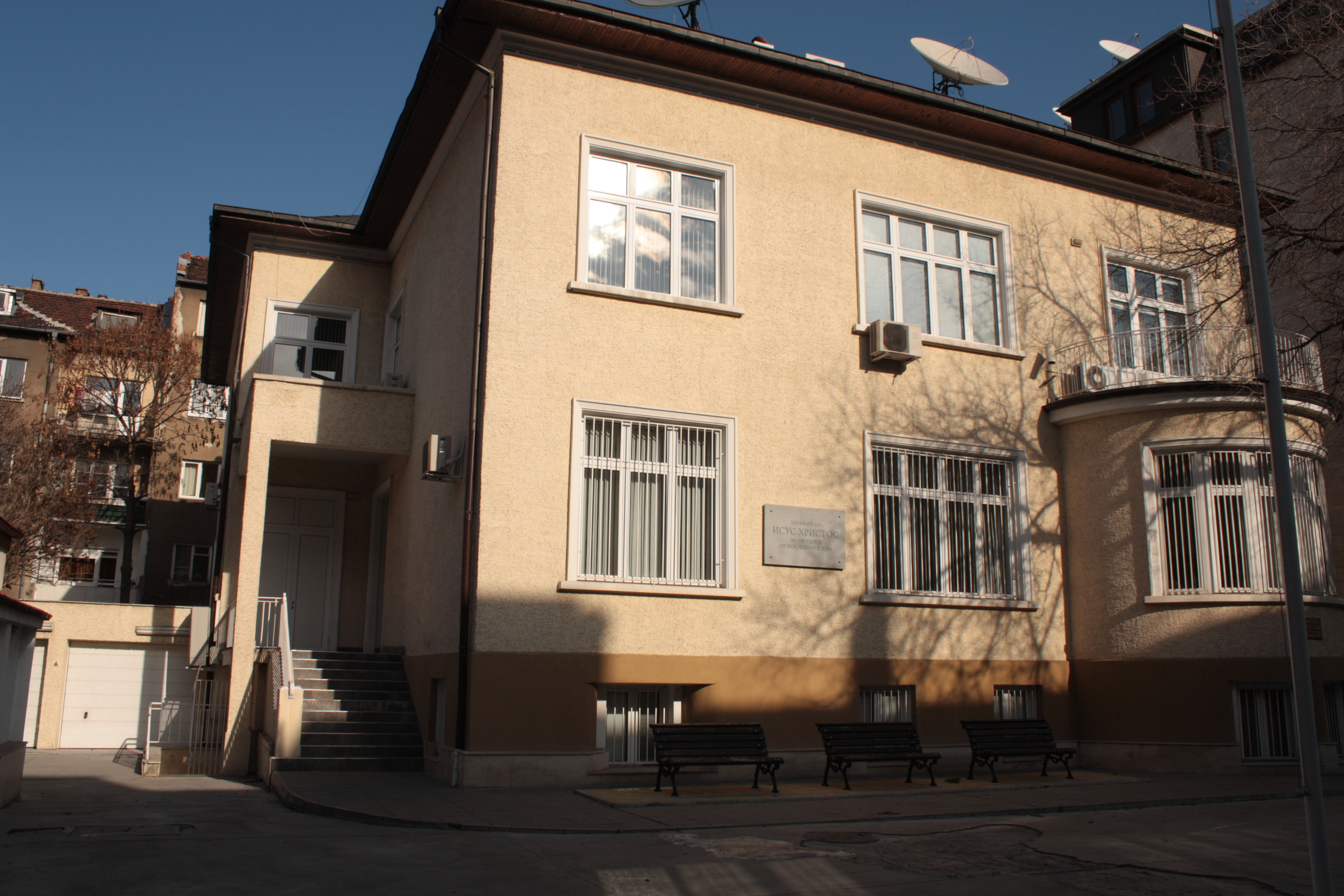
The mission home for the Bulgaria Sofia Mission. A mission home is the official residence of a Mission president.

All missionaries serve in a mission under the direction of a mission president, who, like individual missionaries, is assigned by the LDS Church president. The mission president must be a married high priest in the Melchizedek Priesthood; his wife is asked to serve alongside him. In 2013 the mission president's wife was given additional leadership roles in the mission. Mission presidents are typically in their forties or older, and usually have the financial means to devote themselves full-time to the responsibility for three consecutive years. The church provides mission presidents with a minimal living allowance but it normally requires them to supplement it with their own funds. Often, the mission president must learn the local language spoken in the mission, as the missionaries do (although many mission presidents today have either previously served a mission in the mission language or speak the mission language as their native language).

The mission president has at least two counselors, who are Latter-day Saints usually from the local area who keep their regular employment. The role of the counselors varies by mission, but they typically serve as liaisons between the mission and the local membership of the church. In some areas where the church is newer senior men who are serving full-time missions along with their wives may be called as counselors in the mission presidency.

=== Mission councils ===
Like other units of the church, a leadership council is used to assist in the governance of the mission. Prior to April 2013, this was often called a zone leader council, consisting of the mission president, assistants to the mission president and zone leaders. In April 2013 the zone leader council was replaced by the mission leadership council, which adds the mission president's wife and sister training leaders, a new position consisting of sister missionaries called to give leadership to other sister missionaries.

=== Mission organization ===
==== Organization in areas with stakes ====
Missions are organized in two parallel structures. The first is the organization of the missionaries. The mission president assigns missionary leaders to help him direct the work. Among the leadership assignments in the mission are assistants to the president, zone leaders, and district leaders.

There are two or more missionaries who serve as assistants to the president (not to be confused with the counselors in the mission presidency). The assistants carry out the direction of the mission president in organizing the mission; assigning companionships and proselytizing areas; and overseeing the welfare and training of the missionaries.

Missionaries serving in a given geographic area typically bounded by stakes are organized into a zone. Zones are led by one or more zone leaders and sister training leaders. In many missions a companionship of elders constitutes the zone leaders. However, there are also missions where only one elder is designated the zone leader and his companion holds no special designation. The zones may be geographically large or small, depending on the mission. The number of missionaries in a zone also varies widely.

The zones are divided into districts, each being led by a missionary assigned as a district leader. A district usually has two to four missionary companionships. The zone leaders and district leaders train the missionaries, see after their welfare, conduct interviews, proselytize together, and share successes.

Each missionary companionship has a geographical area which may include all or part of one ward and branch or even several wards or branches. The missionaries are responsible for preaching to the people in their own area.

A mission's ecclesiastical line of authority is from the mission president down to the missionaries. The missionaries answer to the mission president directly, as opposed to the local branch president, bishop, or stake president.

==== Organization in areas without stakes ====
The other type of mission structure exists where there are no organized stakes of the church in an area due to a relatively small number of Latter-day Saints living in the area. This may be the result of the church being relatively new in an area or the church being established in a sparsely populated area of the world. In these stake-less areas, the mission president is the presiding local church authority and he is responsible for the welfare of all the members, not just the missionaries. The mission is divided into districts (not to be confused with the other type of district mentioned above) which serve much the same role as stakes do. Each district is assigned a district president who is usually a local resident; the district president reports directly to the mission presidency. The district presidency perform most of the day-to-day functions that a stake presidency would perform in a stake. Certain duties, such as the issuance of recommends to attend the temple, remain the sole prerogative of the mission president.

Districts within a mission are composed exclusively of branches. After the membership has grown sufficiently, the branches may be converted into wards and the district may be converted into a stake. Typically, this will not occur until there are least five ward-sized congregations in the district. Once a district becomes a stake, the mission president is only responsible for the proselytizing missionaries in the area, not the local members of the church.

=== Variations in size ===
The LDS Church mission with the smallest geographic area (approximately 10 acres) is the Utah Salt Lake Temple Square Mission, in which missionaries from around the world serve on Temple Square, often to visitors from their own homelands. These missionaries serve at Temple Square, and occasionally serve in another mission in another part of the United States for a few months, then return to Temple Square for the final months of their 18-month mission call. Only female missionaries and older, retired couples are called to the Temple Square Mission.

The mission with the largest geographical area is currently the Micronesia Guam Mission, which covers an area that is roughly the size of the continental United States. However, the vast majority of this mission is composed of empty ocean. The largest mission in terms of geographical land mass and population is currently the China Hong Kong Mission, which encompasses nearly all of the Chinese landmass and population. Outside of Hong Kong and Macau, there are no LDS missionaries in China. Prior to its split in November 2007 the India Bangalore Mission has the largest population amongst which proselytizing is allowed. This mission covers all of India, thus it has more than one billion inhabitants in its borders. It is unclear whether the New Delhi or Bangalore mission should now be considered to cover more inhabitants partly because the New Delhi mission covers Nepal, Bangladesh, and Pakistan as well as northern India, and outside of Northern India does little formal proselytizing.

Russia contains missions with very large areas. In the Russia Novosibirsk Mission, it is possible to take a 42-hour train ride to get to the city of Novosibirsk from some places within the mission boundaries.

=== Special language assignments within missions ===
Missionaries are sometimes called to serve in a particular mission, but with a non-standard language assignment. To cite some examples: Kentucky Louisville, Spanish speaking; California Anaheim, Vietnamese speaking; Canada Vancouver, Mandarin speaking; Illinois Chicago, Polish speaking; California San Diego, Arabic speaking, and California Los Angeles, Turkish-speaking.

=== Central church structure ===
The work of the missions is overseen by the Missionary Committee, which consists of the First Presidency and Quorum of the Twelve. Much of the actual work of overseeing the missions is delegated to the Missionary Executive Council (MEC). This committee has roots in the Radio, Publicity and Missionary Literature Committee formed in the 1930s, with Stephen L. Richards as chair and Gordon B. Hinckley as executive secretary. In the late 1940s, Richards and Hinckley held the same positions, with Hinckley essentially fulfilling the duties later undertaken by the missionary department.

By the early 1970s, the MEC consisted of Spencer W. Kimball, Hinckley, Thomas S. Monson and Bruce R. McConkie, all members of the Quorum of the Twelve. L. Tom Perry was chairman of the executive committee for several years in the late 2000s. He was then succeeded by Russell M. Nelson. As of August 2015, most of the current members are not known. However, membership has historically included at least two members of the Quorum of the Twelve Apostles, one member of the Presiding Bishopric and the executive director of the church's Missionary Department, who is usually a member of the First Quorum of the Seventy. As of 1 August 2015, the executive director's identity is not known. Prior to August 2015, David F. Evans had been serving in this capacity. On 19 August 2015, it was announced that Bonnie L. Oscarson, the church's General Young Women President, had been invited to become the first female member of the MEC.

The church's Missionary Department works under the direction of the MEC. The Missionary Department does not develop policy, but oversees its implementation. It directs the missions of the church, along with the 15 Missionary Training Centers and the 20+ visitors' centers and historical sites the church operates.

== History of missions ==
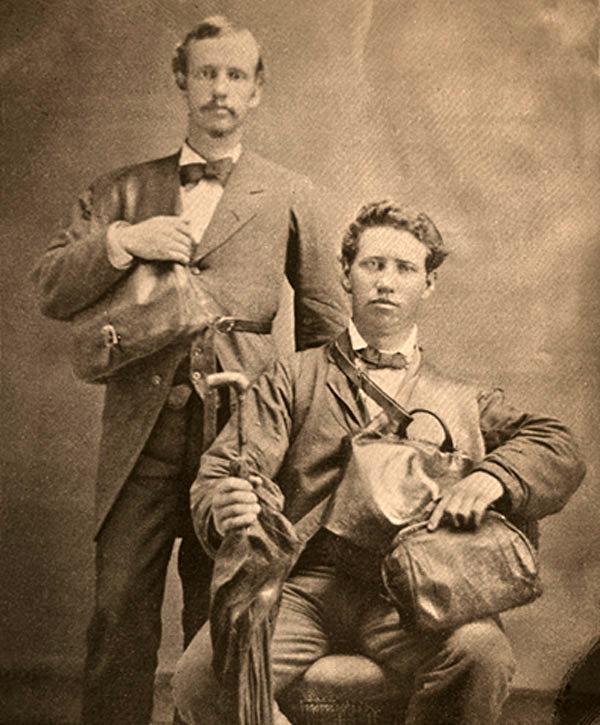
Rudger Clawson and Joseph Standing (seated), missionaries of the LDS Church serving in the Southern States Mission in the United States, pose for a portrait in 1879. While still companions, Standing was killed by a mob of anti-Mormons on 21 July 1879 in Varnell Station, Georgia.

The title of "First Mission" is normally given to the British Mission, today considered the lineal ancestor of the England London Mission. This was begun under the direction of Heber C. Kimball in 1837. Missionary work had previously occurred in the United States and Canada, but missionaries were not organized into specific missions. The work of this mission began in Preston, England, largely because one of the missionaries Joseph Fielding had a brother there who initially opened his chapel to the missionaries preaching. Later they often preached at the location also used by the Temperance Society. The first convert in the British Mission was George D. Watt, who would later be important in the compilation of the Journal of Discourses. Within the first year of missionary work the headquarters of this mission were moved to Manchester. In 1840 they were moved again to Liverpool, largely so the mission leaders could play a role in organizing the emigration of Latter-day Saints to America. In 1929 when the British Mission was separated from the European Mission, its headquarters were moved to Birmingham. The headquarters were moved to London in about 1930 since by this time the church was no longer encouraging Latter-day Saints to emigrate from Britain.

=== United States and Canada ===
==== Early missions ====
Although the church's missionaries served in many parts of the Eastern United States of America from 1830 on, no mission was organized until 1839. In this year a mission was organized in New York City presided over by John P. Greene. However, at this time missionaries continued to serve outside of regular mission areas.

With the removal of the main body of the Saints to Utah Territory and other western states, the number of church members in the Eastern United States was very small. As mission president of the Eastern States Mission, Wilford Woodruff tried to bring all the saints in New England and other eastern areas to move to Utah Territory.

In 1854, after having been defunct for about three years, the Eastern States Mission was organized again. John Taylor presided over this mission. His main function was to publish a paper to disseminate the teachings of the church. The other thing he did was supervise immigration from Europe to Utah, being the first to meet the saints when they came out of Castle Garden. He did preside over the few Saints in New York City but did not functionally administer the church in any larger region.

On the eve of the American Civil War missionary work made much progress in New York City as well as other eastern metropolises. However the call of the gathering to Utah, given more power by the preaching and leadership of Orson Pratt and Erastus Snow, caused many of the saints to "flee Babylon and gather to Zion".

The advent of the U.S. Civil War and its connection in the minds of the Saints with Joseph Smith's prophecies on war caused the vast majority of the Saints to leave the eastern United States and gather to Utah Territory.

During the 1850s the church also had an organization in St. Louis with first Erastus Snow and later Orson Spencer having a regional leadership position somewhat equivalent to that of a mission president, although neither was referred to by this title while they presided from St. Louis.

In the western United States families would be called on settlement missions, but these were not primarily proselytizing missions. Some started as missions to the Native Americans. One such was headed by Orson Hyde and tried to convert the Shoshone in Wyoming. The Southern Indian Mission, with Jacob Hamblin as its most famous missionary, made much progress. These missions were often directed by church leaders in regular wards and stakes and did not become an organized mission at this time.

There were three more missions organized at this time in the United States as we define it today. The California Mission thrived for a short time with the presence of such men as Parley P. Pratt and George Q. Cannon. However, there were nearly as many men on gold-mining missions as regular proselytizing missions. By the time of the Utah War, the California Mission had largely stopped functioning.

The Sandwich Islands Mission was begun in 1850. Among the first missionaries sent to what are now called the Hawaiian Islands was George Q. Cannon who converted Jonatana Napela. The two of them translated the Book of Mormon into Hawaiian, and the church was able to gain many native Hawaiian converts.

The last antebellum mission was the Indian Territory Mission. Organized in 1855 with Henry W. Miller as president, this mission mainly focused on teaching the Cherokee in what is today Oklahoma. There were some converts made in the following five years, however, the mission was soon afterward disbanded.

In 1865, John Taylor again organized the Eastern States Mission. However, this mission stopped functioning in 1869.

==== Establishment of permanent missions ====
The true advent of fully functioning missions, with missionaries functioning under a mission president, in the United States on a large and permanent scale can be dated to the organization of the Southern States Mission. This mission was started in 1876 with Henry G. Boyle as president. A short time later John Hamilton Morgan was made the president of this mission.

The next mission to be organized was the Northern States Mission (initially called the Northwestern States Mission) with headquarters in Council Bluffs, Iowa. The first president of this mission was Cyrus H. Wheelock. Wheelock had served as a missionary in both Iowa and Michigan about this time. The mission was organized in 1878. It was renamed the Northern States Mission in 1889. The mission headquarters were moved to Chicago in 1896.

In 1883, the Indian Territory Mission was reestablished with Matthew W. Dalton as president. In 1898 it was renamed the Southwestern States Mission, signifying it was not only teaching the Native Americans but everyone else in its jurisdiction who would listen. 1892 saw a mission organized in California. This marked the beginning of proselytizing there. John Dalton worked initially in Oakland and San Francisco. In 1893 Karl G. Maeser arrived as head of the Utah exhibit at the mid-winter fair in San Francisco. He also presided over the mission, focusing his efforts on gaining friends in the San Francisco Bay Area. Henry S. Tanner arrived the next August, with missionaries, thus he was able to preside over missionaries. The headquarters of the mission remained in San Francisco, but by August 1895 a branch had been organized in Los Angeles. That year also marked the division of the California mission into Conferences.

In 1893, the Eastern States Mission was organized again. This is the first time the mission was a truly regional one, supervising missionary work throughout much of the eastern United States.

By the 1890s, the leaders of the church were beginning to encourage converts to no longer gather to Utah. With more church members from Utah moving east for employment and education, a nucleus was building around which the church could grow. Still, most people were baptized by missionaries traveling without purse or scrip.

==== Missions in the Western United States ====
Unlike missions in the Eastern United States, in this period missions in the Western States were generally set up in areas into which church members had already begun to move.

The origins of the Northwestern States Mission go back to the Oregon Lumber Company which was run by David Eccles and Charles W. Nibley. Many Latter-day Saints worked in the company's offices in Baker City, Oregon, and a branch was organized there in 1893. At that point this branch was part of the Oneida Stake headquartered in Preston, Idaho.

In 1896, Edward Stevenson was appointed to go open a mission in Oregon, Montana and Washington. As a missionary Stevenson preached in Walla Walla, Washington, Spokane, Washington, Lewiston, Idaho and Baker City, Oregon. The Colorado and Montana Missions were created in 1896. When the Northwestern States Mission was formally organized in 1897 George C. Parkinson served as president.

The Northwestern States and Montana Missions were merged in 1898, at which time Franklin Bramwell, who had been president of the Montana Mission, was made president of the new mission, the entire region now being called the Northwestern States Mission.

The Northwestern States Mission was headquartered in Baker City, Oregon. However, when a stake was organized in Oregon in 1901 with Bramwell as president, the mission headquarters were moved to Portland, Oregon. The next year Nephi Pratt replaced Bramwell as mission president, and the mission moved toward a system of preaching the gospel in areas where Latter-day Saints were a minority.

==== Missions in the early 20th century ====
In 1900, the United States was divided into eight missions, with three whole states and parts of two others outside of all missions. The newly acquired Hawaiian Islands made a ninth mission in the United States. However, missionary work was not going on in the Philippines, Puerto Rico or any of the smaller areas the U.S. had acquired in the Spanish–American War.

- The Eastern States Mission encompassed New England, New York, Pennsylvania, New Jersey, Delaware, West Virginia, Maryland, and the District of Columbia. This mission had its headquarters in Brooklyn, New York. It also included all of Ontario and the parts of Canada further east, though missionaries were only active in Ontario at this time.
- The Southern States Mission covered Florida, Georgia, North and South Carolina, Virginia, Alabama, Mississippi, Tennessee, Kentucky and Ohio. Ohio had been placed in this mission so there was a northern climate where missionaries could recover from illness. The Southern States Mission was headquartered in Chattanooga, Tennessee.
- The Northern States Mission included Michigan, Indiana, Iowa, [Illinois], Minnesota, Wisconsin, and Manitoba. It was headquartered in Chicago.
- The Southwestern States Mission covered Missouri, Kansas, Oklahoma, Arkansas, Louisiana and Texas. It was headquartered in St. John, Kansas.
- The Colorado Mission covered North and South Dakota, Nebraska, the eastern two-thirds of Wyoming, Colorado and New Mexico. It was headquartered in Denver.
- The Northwestern States Mission included Montana, Northern Idaho, Oregon and Washington. It also included Western Canada; however, it would not be until 1902 that Nephi Pratt, president of the Northwestern States Mission and a son of Parley P. Pratt, would lead missionaries into British Columbia. Edward G. Cannon was going about the Nome, Alaska region with a tabernacle on wheels in which to hold church meetings, but he had no actual connection with a mission and had gone to Alaska on his own initiative to share the gospel. The Northwestern States mission was headquartered in Portland, Oregon
- The last mission was the California Mission, which in 1900 had boundaries coterminous with California. It was headquartered in Los Angeles.

Arizona, Nevada, Utah, Southern Idaho and Western Wyoming, all areas which by that time had large Mormon populations, were not in any mission. Missionary work, to the extent that it occurred in these areas, was administered through the Home Missionary Program at the stake level.

In 1902, the Middle States Mission was created with Ben E. Rich as president. However, in 1903, Ephraim H. Nye, president of the Southern States mission, died. He was replaced by Ben E. Rich and the boundaries of the missions were realigned. In 1904, the Southwestern States Mission was renamed the Central States Mission. After the San Francisco earthquake and fire in 1906, the mission headquarters was relocated to Los Angeles from San Francisco. In the next few years the headquarters of the Central States Mission were moved to Independence, Missouri, and the headquarters of the Northwestern States Mission were moved to Portland, Oregon. By 1907, the Colorado Mission was renamed the Western States Mission. Also in these years, the headquarters of the Southern States Mission moved from Chattanooga to Atlanta, Georgia.

In 1919, the first major change to missions in more than 15 years occurred. Ontario, Manitoba and Québec were split from the Eastern States Mission and the Northern States Mission and organized as the Canadian Mission. In 1925, the North Central States Mission was organized with parts of the Western States, Northern States, and Canadian Missions included. In 1926, Ohio was transferred to the Northern States Mission.

To get a sense of how large these missions were, in 1922 part of southwest New Mexico was added to the jurisdiction of the California mission.

==== Central States Mission history ====
The Missouri Independence Mission is one of the oldest missions. Its history goes back to 1855.

In the 1855 General Conference the church called missionaries to the Indian Territory. They worked primarily with the Cherokee and the Creeks. There were also several converts made among the followers of Lyman Wight some of whom by that time were residing in Oklahoma. At the end of the year a company of 65 left for Utah. Early church apostle Parley P. Pratt was killed in the mission near Alma, Arkansas in 1857.

An early leader of the mission here was Henry Eyring, who presided 1858 to 1860. Eyring was an ancestor of the scientist Henry Eyring and apostle Henry B. Eyring.

In 1859 all except Eyring were expelled by Indian Agents as an outgrowth of the Utah War. With Eyring's departure the following year little missionary work occurred until 1877 when Matthew Dalton and John Hubbard served in the Indian Territory. The mission was non-existent again for six years until George Teasdale and Matthew Dalton reopened the work in 1883. Teasdale wrote several tracks at this time.

In 1885 Andrew Kimball, the father of church president Spencer W. Kimball, became the president of the mission. Under his leadership the mission expanded to include Kansas, Arkansas and Texas in its domain. The headquarters were by the time he was released from this position in 1897 at St. John, Kansas. In 1900 the headquarters were still at St. John.

In October 1900 Louisiana and Missouri were added to the mission. Earlier that year James G. Duffin became president of the mission. He presided over the organization of a colony of Latter-day Saints at Kelsey, Upshur County, Texas. There were also church colonies established in the vicinity of Poynor, Henderson County, Texas and Spurger, Tyler County, Texas.

In 1904 the name of the mission was changed to the Central States Mission. In 1906 Samuel O. Bennion became president of the mission. In that same year the mission headquarters were moved to Independence, Missouri.

Independence soon developed into the publication headquarters for the missions of the church in the United States. the mission operated Zion's Printing and Publishing Company which published Liahona the Elders Journal as well as many books and tracts.

In the 1910s Spencer W. Kimball served as a missionary in the Central States Mission.

In 1930 there were twelve districts in the Central States mission, the Arkansas, East Kansas, East Texas, Independence, Louisiana, Missouri, North Texas, Oklahoma, South Texas, Southwest Missouri, West Kansas and West Texas.

President Bennion was called to the First Council of the Seventy in 1933, but he continued to serve as president of the Central States Mission until 1935.

The modern mission generally corresponds to the Independence and East Kansas Districts of 1930.

In 1931 the Texas Mission was split off from the Southern area of the Central States Mission.

In 1974 the mission was renamed the Missouri Independence Mission. All missions were renamed in 1974 going from a system that tried to identify missions by a generalized notation of the location to naming them after the city in which they were headquartered. Later, some missions such as the Baltic State Mission and the Alpine German Speaking Mission were created that moved away from this format, but as of 2010 over 99% of missions worldwide had names in the country/city or state/city format.

==== Early 20th century growth of the Northwestern States Mission ====
From 1902 to 1909 Nephi Pratt served as the president of the mission. He was succeeded by Melvin J. Ballard. Among Ballard's successors in the 1920s was Brigham S. Young, a son of Brigham Young Jr. and a grandson of Brigham Young and Orson Spencer. During the ten years Ballard was president the mission began teaching groups of Native Americans within its boundaries. By 1930 there were nine church-owned chapels as well as 23 organized branches in the mission. The mission did not include any organized stake. Missionary efforts had been extended into British Columbia and Alaska, although there was only one branch in British Columbia and no branches in Alaska.

==== Mission field versus stakes ====
Early on in church history, a general dichotomy grew up where the "mission field" was viewed as a separate area from the stakes of the church.

This line began to blur in the 1920s. With the organization of stakes in California, the mission still sent missionaries into those areas although it no longer had jurisdiction over the local units.

==== East Central States Mission history ====
The ancestor of the current Kentucky Louisville Mission was the East Central States Mission. It was organized in November 1928. It took in Kentucky, Tennessee, North Carolina, Virginia from the Southern States Mission and West Virginia and part of Maryland from the Eastern States Mission. Miles L. Jones, the new mission president, set up headquarters at Louisville.

By 1930 the Mission had eight districts, the Kentucky, East Kentucky, North Carolina, East Tennessee, Middle Tennessee, Virginia, West Virginia North and West Virginia South Districts.

==== Post–Second World War expansion ====
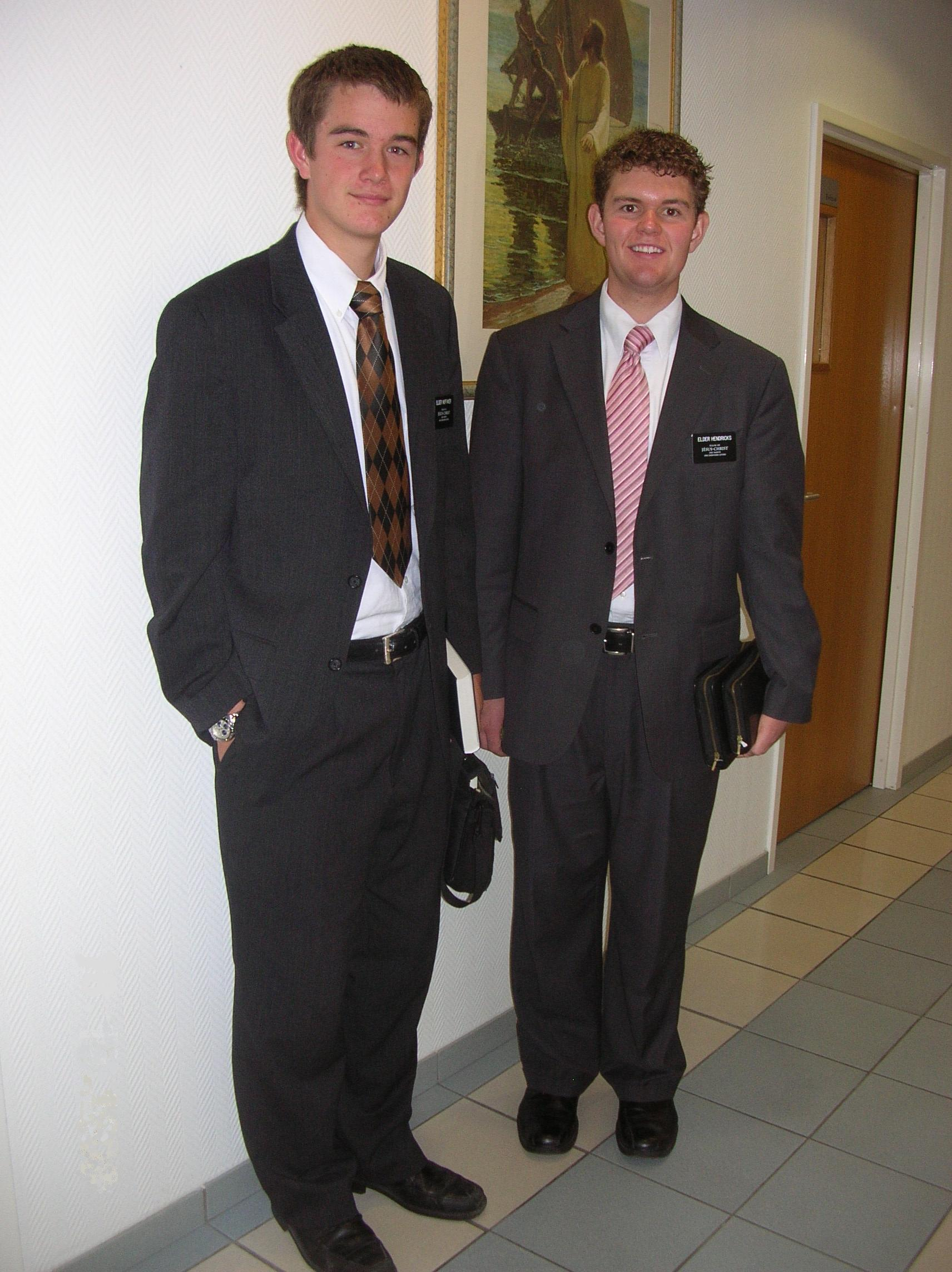
Two missionaries of The Church of Jesus-Christ of Latter-day Saints in 2008.

In 1945 there were the following missions in the United States:

- Northern California (organized 1942)
- Navajo-Zuni (organized 1943)
- New England (organized 1937)
- Spanish-American (organized 1936)
- Texas (organized 1931)
- East Central States
- North Central States
- Northwestern States
- Western States
- Central States
- Southern States
- Eastern States
- Northern States

In May 1945 the Texas Mission was renamed the Texas Louisiana Mission. In October 1947 the Central Atlantic States Mission was formed from the East Central States Mission. This mission was headquartered at Roanoke, Virginia. In 1970 this mission was renamed the North Carolina-Virginia Mission. In 1974 it became the Virginia Roanoke Mission. It was renamed the Virginia Richmond Mission in February 1992 and currently has its headquarters in Richmond.

In 1949 the Great Lakes Mission was organized, consisting of Michigan, Indiana and Ohio. The West Central States mission was organized in 1950, consisting primarily of Montana and Wyoming. There was then a break until a new mission was organized in the United States. There was no new mission organized in the United States for almost eight years after this. The general plan of having "states" in the various mission names was expanded when in 1955 the Texas-Louisiana Mission was renamed the Gulf States Mission.

In March 1958 the West Spanish-American Mission was organized. In October 1960 the Eastern Atlantic States Mission was organized with George B. Hill as president. This mission included the District of Columbia, Maryland, Delaware and southern New Jersey. This was the last new mission formed with "states" in its name. The next month the Florida Mission was organized with Karl R. Lyman as president. In February 1961 a new Texas Mission was split off from the Gulf States Mission.

In 1964 the Cumorah Mission was organized from the Eastern States Mission. Headquartered in Rochester, New York this showed that the "states" naming of missions was doomed. This mission would be renamed New York Rochester in 1974. This year also saw the organization of the Northern Indian Mission, organized from the Southwest Indian Mission, formerly the Navajo-Zuni Mission. This was the heyday of separate missions organized to proselyte with specific linguistic and ethnic groups. The California South Mission was formed in June 1966. 1967 saw two new missions that showed that "states" no longer made sense with missions since it was becoming true that missions often covered no more than one state. The Ohio Mission was organized from the Great Lakes Mission and the Texas South Mission was organized from the Texas and the Spanish-American missions. 1967 also saw the rest of the Spanish American Mission put in the Western States and Texas Missions. A decision had been made to have missionaries assigned to missions by area and not language. The full effects of this decision would not been seen for a few more years. On the 1st day of 1968 the Pacific Northwest Mission was organized. This made it so the Northwestern States mission was essential Oregon and adjacent parts of Idaho and the Pacific Northwest Mission was Washington with neighboring portions of Idaho.

Salt Lake City was first included in a regular mission in 1975. This was with the organization of the Utah Salt Lake City Mission.

=== Latin America ===
The first mission in Latin America was an attempt in the 1850s by Parley P. Pratt to preach in Chile. He made no progress and did not make a permanent impact.

It was not until the 1870s, after Meliton Trejo and Daniel Jones had translated the Book of Mormon into Spanish that missionary work began on a permanent footing in Mexico. The first mission president there was Moses Thatcher. Another early mission president in that land was Helaman Pratt, son of Parley and father of Rey Pratt.

The first permanent mission in South America was formed in 1925 under the direction of Melvin J. Ballard.

Missionary work in Central America began in the late 1940s under the supervision of the Mexican Mission. A separate Central American Mission was organized in November 1952. In 1956 Mexican Mission was again divided with the Northern Mexican Mission being formed. A third mission was organized in 1960, this time by splitting the Northern Mexican mission and forming the West Mexican Mission, which would later become the Mexico Hermosillo Mission.

=== Europe ===
After the initial opening of the British Mission it would be over ten years before missions would open in continental Europe. Although a missionary was sent to Germany in 1840 and Orson Hyde traveled across Europe in the early 1840s, it would not be until after the Latter-day Saints had gone to the Salt Lake Valley that missions would be established in Europe.

In October General Conference of 1849 three apostles were called to open missionary work in Europe. Erastus Snow was assigned to open missionary work in Scandinavia. The other two assignments were for Lorenzo Snow to go to Italy and John Taylor to go to France. There were other elders assigned to accompany each of these apostles, so a mission organization was in place even before any missionaries had reached their destinations. The French mission came to include the Channel Islands under John Taylor's direction, and this was where the mission saw the most converts in the early days. A few years later one of Taylor's converts, Louis Bertrand, returned to the mission and organized a Mormon newspaper out of Paris. He had little success in winning converts.

The Scandinavian mission came to encompass Sweden, Denmark, Norway and Iceland.

The Italian mission, despite the presence of Joseph Toronto, was largely confined to northern Italy among the Waldensians. Lorenzo Snow also supervised the opening of the Swiss Mission. This mission eventually became the Swiss-Italian-German mission a few years later, and then "Italian" was dropped from the name since no missionary work was going on in Italy.

Missionary work in Portugal began after the Portuguese Revolution of 1974. David M. Kennedy was a special representative of the church who visited with Portuguese officials in Lisbon during August 1974. These officials granted Kennedy's request to establish the church in Portugal and to allow missionaries to enter the country. The Portuguese Parliament passed a law in November 1974 granting freedom of religion. Soon after, the church organized the Portugal Lisbon Mission, with William Grant Bangerter as the mission president.

=== Oceania ===
The first missionaries to the Pacific Islands went to French Polynesia in 1844. These missionaries had much success in baptizing converts, but there were only three missionaries so no fully functioning organization was needed. Addison Pratt was designated the mission president, but the missionaries made decisions jointly on where to labor.

In 1850 a mission was organized in Hawaii. Here there was also a designated mission president, and there were enough missionaries to make it a clear process of assigning missionaries to specific areas. However, each area was an island, and the number of missionaries in each area varied. Beyond this, the decision to go from teaching in English to American and English sailors temporarily on the islands and other expatriates to teaching the natives in the Hawaiian Language was made by George Q. Cannon, who was not the mission president.

Although some British Latter-day Saints on their way to Australia were set apart as missionaries in the early 1840s, missionary work on an organized basis did not begin there until the arrival of John Murdock and Charles Wandell in 1851. As of 2024, the church has over 157,000 members and over 300 congregations in Australia. In the past 40 years, Mormon missionaries have been visiting remote Aboriginal communities in the Central Desert region, including tiny outstations such as Mulga Bore and Angkula in the Northern Territory. Local artists provide interpretations of teachings from the Book of Mormon using Indigenous Australian art techniques.

=== International Mission ===
In 1973, the church created the International Mission and gave it responsibility for all areas of the world not otherwise assigned to organized missions. Its purpose was the dissemination of church materials to correspondents who did not reside in organized missions. As the missionary work has expanded, the role of the International Mission has been superseded, and it was closed in about 1989.

=== Africa ===
The first mission in Africa was the South African Mission, originally organized in 1851. This became the South Africa Cape Town and South Africa Johannesburg missions in 1985. Later, the South Africa Durban Mission was created from portions of these missions as well as other regions in southern Africa.

==== West Africa ====
There were attempts to open a mission in Nigeria in the 1960s. However the church decided against proceeding with these plans.

After the 1978 revelation extending the priesthood to all worthy males was received, the church proceeded to open missions in West Africa. Initially the focus was on Ghana and Nigeria, where there were groups that with unofficial church members who had been for years begging the church to send missionaries. Initially the missionaries sent to these nations were organized in the International Mission. As missionary work in these areas progressed they were organized as the West African Mission in 1981.

French-speaking areas of Africa were originally organized into a separate Cameroon Yaounde Mission in 1991. The original plan was to have the mission cover a broad range of French speaking areas. However, after a short time it was decided to initially focus on building up the church in Côte d'Ivoire, and so the mission headquarters was moved to Abidjan.

=== Asia ===
The Japanese mission was split in 1968, with the mission headquartered in Tokyo retaining that name while a new mission was organized based in southern Japan that was designated the Japan-Okinawa Mission. The new mission was headed by Edward Y. Okazaki, a Japanese-American, along with his Japanese-American wife Chieko N. Okazaki. This mission was split again two years later. The Japan Central Mission was organized with headquarters in Kobe and with Okazaki continuing as president of that mission. The Japan West Mission was also organized at this time with headquarters in Fukuoka.

== Reunions ==
Many missionaries working together build strong bonds of friendship, and for a few years after their missions are over, a former mission president will host reunions of missionaries who served during his tenure. As the missionaries come from many different parts of the world, it is common that the reunions are held in Utah, especially during church general conference weekends, as it provides for the probability of the largest number of attendees. Several web sites have been created by church members with the express purpose of allowing mission alumni to keep in contact.

== See also ==
- Area (LDS Church)
