= New Diana Independent School District =

School district in Texas

New Diana Independent School District is a public school district based in the community of Diana, Texas (USA). The district is located in eastern Upshur County and extends into a small portion of northwestern Harrison County.

== Schools ==
New Diana ISD has. Three campuses -

- New Diana High School (Grades 9–12)
- New Diana Middle School (Grades 6 -8)
- Robert F. Hunt Elementary School (Grades PreK-5)

In 2009, the school district was rated "recognized" by the Texas Education Agency.
