= Coffeeville, Texas =

Ghost town in Texas, United States

Coordinates: 32°49′45″N 94°45′28″W

Coffeeville is a ghost town in northeastern Upshur County in East Texas, United States. It is one of the oldest settlements in East Texas.

== History ==
The town lies south of Texas State Highway 155 and five miles west of Lake O' the Pines in "pine country." The place is named after early settlers, the Coffee family, although some accounts claim that the name's origin is from the smell of brewing coffee at campsites in the area or from when a green coffee bean was spilled in the area and took root.

The town first developed when the town of Jefferson was a riverport and Coffeeville was approximately one day's journey west. Coffeeville was also a resting and resupplying point for wagon trains headed west. The area was settled by former Southern planters between 1845 and 1866.

According to the Handbook of Texas:

By 1852 a post office was established there. In the 1850s, the community had Methodist and Presbyterian churches, three doctors, two dry-goods stores, two grocery stores, a drugstore, a Masonic lodge, an academy, and a large hotel. At its peak, Coffeeville included several saloons, a bowling and pool hall, numerous blacksmith shops, and five churches. As late as 1867, the town had one of only four high schools in Upshur County; this school had an enrollment of seventy.

The town declined during and after the Civil War. During the war the town, at the request of Governor Edward Clark, was a training site for the Confederate soldiers. Following the war, railroad routes bypassed the town and its population steadily dwindled, from 2000 in 1887 to 152 in 1904 and 50 in 1946. The post office closed in 1915, and by 1940 only two stores remained. In 2000 there was a reported population of 50, but except for a small church building, nothing remains in the town.
