= Harmony Independent School District =

School district in Texas

Harmony Independent School District is a public school district that serves west central Upshur County, Texas (USA), and a small portion of eastern Wood County.

In 2009, the school district was rated "academically acceptable" by the Texas Education Agency.

== History ==
The district was founded in 1938, with the consolidation of Rosewood, Rhonesboro, Union (Little Mound), and Honey Creek schools. As the passage of the consolidation went with considerable ease, the name "Harmony" was chosen as the name for the new district.

Other schools which later consolidated with Harmony include Grice, Peach, Enon, Rhonesboro, Soules Chapel, Latch, Rosewood, and part of Kelsey

== Notable alumni ==
- Rob Childress (class of 1986) College baseball coach
- Kevin Aguilar (class of 2007) UFC fighter

== Schools ==
- Harmony High (Grades 9-12)
- Harmony Junior High (Grades 6-8)
- Irons-Smith Intermediate (Grades 4-5)
- James Poole Elementary (Grades PK-3)
