= Union Hill Independent School District =

School district in Texas

Coordinates: 32°48′46″N 94°58′47″W

Union Hill Independent School District is a public school district that serves northwestern Upshur County, Texas, United States, and a small portion of northeastern Wood County.

In 2009, the school district was rated "academically acceptable" by the Texas Education Agency.

== History ==
The district was formed in 1927 by the consolidation of the Bettie, Forest Hill, and Olive Branch schools. In subsequent years, several other schools merged with the Union Hill district: Brumley (1945), Simpsonville (1947), Perryville (1948), and Bethlehem (1968). The district changed from a common school district to an independent school district in 1951.

== Schools ==
Union Hill ISD operates two campuses:

- Union Hill High (grades 6-12)
- Sharon A. Richardson Elementary (prekindergarten-grade 5).
