= Ore City Independent School District =

School district in Texas

Address
- 100 Rebel Road Ore City, Texas, 75683; United States
- Coordinates: 32.8072°N 94.7208°W

District information
- Type: Public School District
- Grades: Pre-K – 12th grade
- Superintendent: Rachel Evers
- Governing agency: Texas Education Agency
- Schools: 3

Students and staff
- Students: ~825
- Athletic conference: UIL
- District mascot: Pirate/Rebel
- Colors: Black & Vegas Gold

Other information
- ESC Region: 7
- Website: Ore City ISD

Ore City Independent School District (Ore City ISD) is a public school district headquartered in Ore City, Texas, United States. It serves most of the area surrounding Lake O' the Pines, with the district located in northeastern Upshur County. The district also extends into select portions of Marion and Harrison counties. Ore City ISD offers education for students from Pre-Kindergarten through grade 12, and it is known for its commitment to student success and academic achievement.

The district has three campuses:

- Ore City High School (Grades 9–12)
- Ore City Middle School (Grades 6–8)
- Ore City Elementary School (Grades PK–5)

The district is proud of its strong academic programs and extracurricular activities, offering students opportunities to grow both academically and personally. It has a history of success in various state competitions, particularly in academics and debate.

In 2009, the school district was rated "academically acceptable" by the Texas Education Agency. Ore City ISD has continued to improve its performance, with a focus on both core education and student well-being.

== Academics ==
Ore City ISD offers a educational experience with a variety of programs and extracurricular activities that cater to the academic, athletic, and artistic interests of its students.

=== State Titles ===
Ore City ISD has a proud tradition of academic excellence, especially in policy debate. The district has earned the following state titles:

- Policy Debate
  - 2023 (2A) - Amir Sultan and Layne Morris
  - 2024 (2A) - Amir Sultan and Sadie Bonnette
  - 2025 (2A) - Amir Sultan and Sadie Bonnette
  - 2026 (2A) - Sadie Bonnette and Annabelle Dan

== Sports ==
=== Athletic Programs ===
Ore City ISD offers sports such as:

- Football
- Basketball
- Volleyball
- Tennis
- Golf
- Track and Field
- Cross Country
- Baseball
- Softball
