= Samuel O. Bennion =

American Mormon leader (1874–1945)

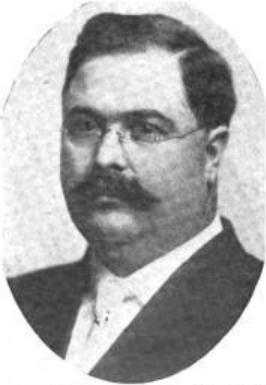
- Bennion while president of the Central States Mission

First Council of the Seventy
- April 6, 1933 – March 8, 1945
- Called by: Heber J. Grant

Personal details
- Born: Samuel Otis Bennion; June 9, 1874; Taylorsville, Utah Territory, United States
- Died: March 8, 1945 (aged 70); Salt Lake City, Utah, United States
- Resting place: Taylorsville Memorial Park; 40.6706°N 111.9367°W
- Spouse(s): Charlotte E. Towler
- Parents: John R.Bennion; Emma J. Terry

Samuel Otis Bennion (June 9, 1874 – March 8, 1945) was a member of the First Council of the Seventy of the Church of Jesus Christ of Latter-day Saints from 1933 until his death.

== Biography ==
Bennion was born in Taylorsville, Utah Territory. He became the president of the Central States Mission of the church in 1906. In this capacity, Bennion supervised all the church missionaries and church members in Texas, Oklahoma, Missouri, Kansas, Arkansas and Louisiana. He also supervised the publication of Liahona the Elders Journal and a publishing house.

In 1933, Bennion became a member of the First Council of the Seventy and a general authority of the church. He continued to preside over the Central States Mission until 1935. He died at Salt Lake City of a coronary occlusion.
