= Upshur County, Texas =

County in Texas, United States

- County
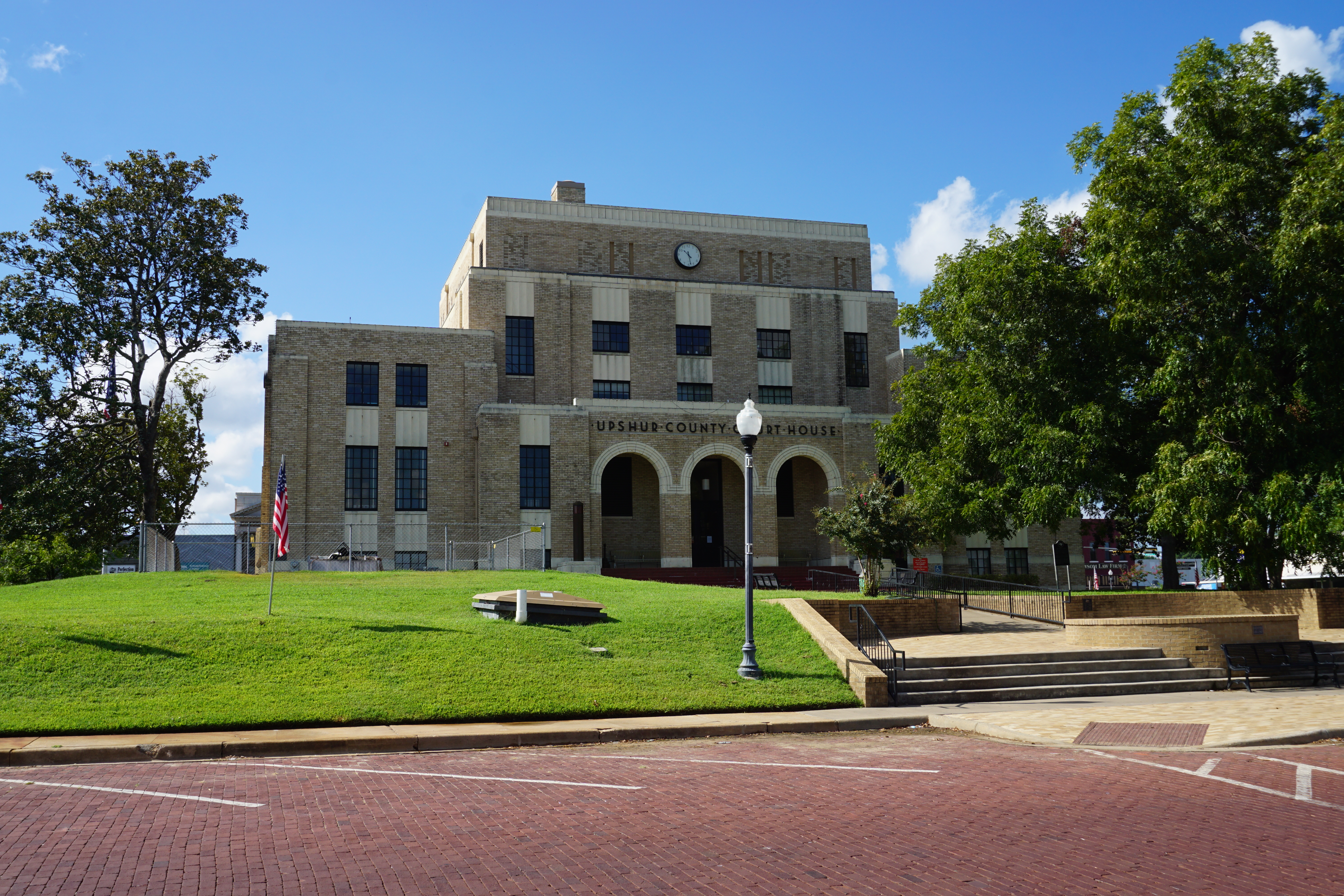
- Upshur County Courthouse

- Location within the U.S. state of Texas
- Coordinates: 32°44′N 94°56′W
- Country: United States
- State: Texas
- Founded: 1846
- Named for: Abel P. Upshur
- Seat: Gilmer
- Largest city: Gladewater

Area
  - Total: 593 sq mi (1,540 km^{2})
  - Land: 583 sq mi (1,510 km^{2})
  - Water: 9.7 sq mi (25 km^{2}) 1.6%

Population (2020)
  - Total: 40,892
  - Estimate (2025): 44,410 ▲
  - Density: 70.1/sq mi (27.1/km^{2})
- Time zone: UTC−6 (Central)
  - Summer (DST): UTC−5 (CDT)
- Congressional districts: 1st, 5th
- Website: www.countyofupshur.com

Upshur County is a county located in the eastern part of the U.S. state of Texas. As of the 2020 census, its population was 40,892. The county seat is Gilmer. The county is named for Abel P. Upshur, who was U.S. secretary of state during President John Tyler's administration.

Upshur County is part of the Longview, Texas metropolitan statistical area, and the Longview–Marshall, combined statistical area.

== History ==
Humans have inhabited what is now Upshur County since at least 10,000 years ago. The Caddoan people lived in this area, but were driven out about 1750, probably due to losses from new infectious diseases carried chronically by Europeans.

Later, some Cherokee migrated to the area from their territories in the Southeast – Georgia and Alabama. The Cherokee were driven out of here by European-American settlers in 1839, after having been removed from the Southeast.

The first European-American settler in Upshur County was probably Isaac Moody, who settled there in 1836. Upshur County was named for Abel Parker Upshur, secretary of state under John Tyler.

Upshur County has the distinction of being the county that has the largest settlement in Texas organized by the Church of Jesus Christ of Latter-day Saints. In 1904, the Latter-day Saint Southwestern States Mission organized a colony at Kelsey, Texas.

In 1919, Chilton Jennings, a 28-year-old African-American man, was lynched in Gilmer’s town square by a mob of about 1,000 White residents.

On March 21, 2022, Upshur County was hit by an EF-2 tornado, with winds reported as high as 135 mph. Extensive damage was reported, but no fatalities. This tornado was a part of the tornado outbreak of March 21–23, 2022.

== Geography ==
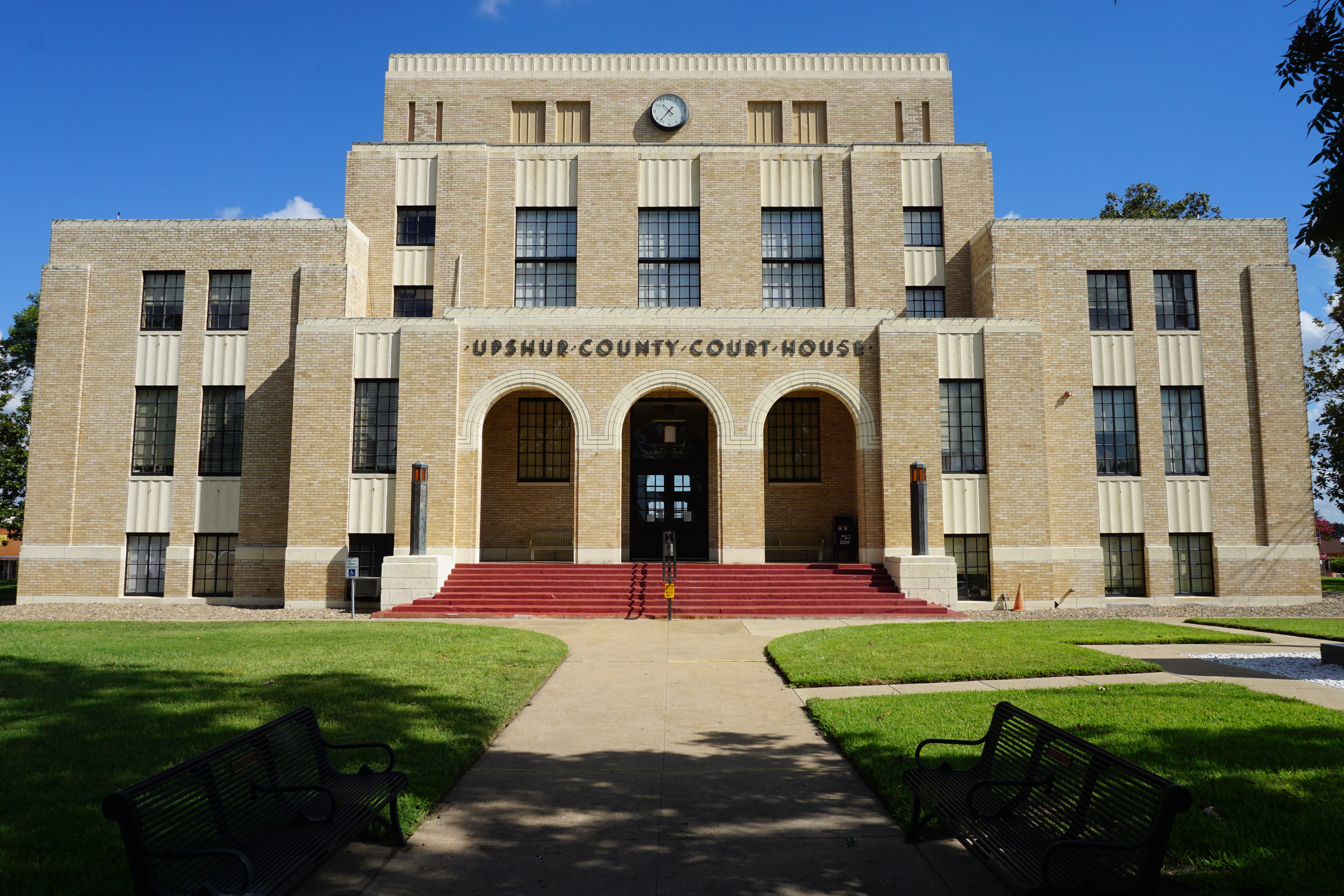
Upshur County Courthouse

According to the U.S. Census Bureau, the county has a total area of 593 square miles (1,540 km^{2}), of which 9.7 sq mi (25 km^{2}) (1.6%) are covered by water.

=== Major highways ===
- U.S. Highway 80
- U.S. Highway 259
- U.S. Highway 271
- State Highway 154
- State Highway 155
- State Highway 300

=== Adjacent counties ===
- Camp County (north)
- Morris County (northeast)
- Marion County (east)
- Harrison County (southeast)
- Gregg County (south)
- Smith County (southwest)
- Wood County (west)

== Communities ==
=== Cities ===
- Clarksville City (mostly in Gregg County)
- East Mountain (a small part of Gregg County)
- Gilmer (county seat)
- Gladewater (partly in Gregg County and Upshur County )
- Ore City
- Union Grove
- Warren City (mostly in Gregg County) Pritchett, Texas, Big Sandy, Texas, Bettie, Texas, and there are many other small communities in Upshur County.

=== Town ===
- Big Sandy

=== Unincorporated communities ===
- Coffeeville
- Diana
- Enoch
- Kelsey
- Rhonesboro
- Simpsonville
- Elam Springs
- Summerfield

== Demographics ==
Historical population
| Census | Pop. | Note | %± |
|---|---|---|---|
| 1850 | 3,394 | | — |
| 1860 | 10,645 | | 213.6% |
| 1870 | 12,039 | | 13.1% |
| 1880 | 10,266 | | −14.7% |
| 1890 | 12,695 | | 23.7% |
| 1900 | 16,266 | | 28.1% |
| 1910 | 19,960 | | 22.7% |
| 1920 | 22,472 | | 12.6% |
| 1930 | 22,297 | | −0.8% |
| 1940 | 26,178 | | 17.4% |
| 1950 | 20,822 | | −20.5% |
| 1960 | 19,793 | | −4.9% |
| 1970 | 20,976 | | 6.0% |
| 1980 | 28,595 | | 36.3% |
| 1990 | 31,370 | | 9.7% |
| 2000 | 35,291 | | 12.5% |
| 2010 | 39,309 | | 11.4% |
| 2020 | 40,892 | | 4.0% |
| 2025 (est.) | 44,410 | ▲ | 8.6% |
U.S. Decennial Census; 1850–2010 2010 2020

=== Racial and ethnic composition ===
Upshur County, Texas – Racial and ethnic composition Note: the US Census treats Hispanic/Latino as an ethnic category. This table excludes Latinos from the racial categories and assigns them to a separate category. Hispanics/Latinos may be of any race.
| Race / Ethnicity (NH = Non-Hispanic) | Pop 1980 | Pop 1990 | Pop 2000 | Pop 2010 | Pop 2020 | % 1980 | % 1990 | % 2000 | % 2010 | % 2020 |
|---|---|---|---|---|---|---|---|---|---|---|
| White alone (NH) | 23,904 | 26,714 | 29,728 | 32,257 | 31,287 | 83.60% | 85.16% | 84.24% | 82.06% | 76.51% |
| Black or African American alone (NH) | 4,367 | 3,858 | 3,557 | 3,388 | 2,908 | 15.27% | 12.30% | 10.08% | 8.62% | 7.11% |
| Native American or Alaska Native alone (NH) | 86 | 115 | 191 | 206 | 261 | 0.30% | 0.37% | 0.54% | 0.52% | 0.64% |
| Asian alone (NH) | 16 | 28 | 65 | 146 | 177 | 0.06% | 0.09% | 0.18% | 0.37% | 0.43% |
| Native Hawaiian or Pacific Islander alone (NH) | x | x | 7 | 3 | 9 | x | x | 0.02% | 0.01% | 0.02% |
| Other race alone (NH) | 7 | 14 | 30 | 35 | 150 | 0.02% | 0.04% | 0.09% | 0.09% | 0.37% |
| Mixed race or Multiracial (NH) | x | x | 319 | 661 | 2,114 | x | x | 0.90% | 1.68% | 5.17% |
| Hispanic or Latino (any race) | 215 | 641 | 1,394 | 2,613 | 3,986 | 0.75% | 2.04% | 3.95% | 6.65% | 9.75% |
| Total | 28,595 | 31,370 | 35,291 | 39,309 | 40,892 | 100.00% | 100.00% | 100.00% | 100.00% | 100.00% |

=== 2020 census ===
As of the 2020 census, the county had a population of 40,892. The median age was 40.7 years. 24.5% of residents were under the age of 18 and 18.5% of residents were 65 years of age or older. For every 100 females there were 97.3 males, and for every 100 females age 18 and over there were 94.4 males age 18 and over.

The racial makeup of the county was 78.8% White, 7.2% Black or African American, 0.8% American Indian and Alaska Native, 0.4% Asian, <0.1% Native Hawaiian and Pacific Islander, 4.4% from some other race, and 8.2% from two or more races. Hispanic or Latino residents of any race comprised 9.7% of the population.

19.3% of residents lived in urban areas, while 80.7% lived in rural areas.

There were 15,374 households in the county, of which 32.8% had children under the age of 18 living in them. Of all households, 53.6% were married-couple households, 16.7% were households with a male householder and no spouse or partner present, and 24.3% were households with a female householder and no spouse or partner present. About 24.0% of all households were made up of individuals and 11.7% had someone living alone who was 65 years of age or older.

There were 17,347 housing units, of which 11.4% were vacant. Among occupied housing units, 77.3% were owner-occupied and 22.7% were renter-occupied. The homeowner vacancy rate was 1.7% and the rental vacancy rate was 9.6%.

=== 2000 census ===
As of the 2000 census, 35,291 people, 13,290 households, and 10,033 families resided in the county. The population density was 60 people per square mile (23 people/km^{2}). The 14,930 housing units averaged 25 units per square mile (9.7 units/km^{2}). The racial makeup of the county was 85.70% White, 10.15% African American, 0.63% Native American, 0.18% Asian, 0.06% Pacific Islander, 2.10% from other races, and 1.17% from two or more races. About 3.95% of the population was Hispanic or Latino of any race.

Of the 13,290 households, 33.50% had children under 18 living with them, 60.70% were married couples living together, 11.00% had a female householder with no husband present, and 24.50% were not families. About 21.80% of all households were made up of individuals, and 10.30% had someone living alone who was 65 or older. The average household size was 2.62 and the average family size was 3.05.

In the county, the population was distributed as 27.0% under 18, 8.0% from 18 to 24, 26.6% from 25 to 44, 24.1% from 45 to 64, and 14.3% who were 65 or older. The median age was 38 years. For every 100 females, there were 95.50 males. For every 100 females 18 and over, there were 91.10 males.

The median income for a household in the county was $33,347, and for a family was $38,857. Males had a median income of $31,216 versus $20,528 for females. The per capita income for the county was $16,358. 14.90% of the population and 12.30% of families were below the poverty line. Out of the total population, 18.6% of those under 18 and 14.0% of those 65 and older were living below the poverty line.

== Politics ==
Upshur County is represented in the Texas Senate by Republican Bryan Hughes, from Mineola.

Upshur County is represented in the Texas House of Representatives by Republican Cole Hefner, from Mount Pleasant.

Upshur County is located within District 5 of the Texas House of Representatives. Upshur County is located within District 1 of the Texas Senate.

Upshur County, along with Marion County, is the 115th Judicial District of Texas; the presiding judge of the district is Judge Dean Fowler. He began his first term as district judge on January 1, 2019, and was unopposed in his re-election, to that office, beginning January 1, 2023. Prior to serving as judge of the 115th Judicial District, Fowler served for 16 years as the Upshur County Judge, beginning January 1, 2003, until December 31, 2018.

Per the Texas Constitution of 1876, the chief administrative body of Upshur County is the five-member Upshur County Commissioners Court. The county judge is elected separately. The county road maintenance is administrated by the county road administrator. This system was adopted in Upshur County in November 2002 and reaffirmed by two subsequent elections. The commissioners court oversees all of the Upshur County government's operations.

Upshur County Judge Todd Tefteller began his first term on January 1, 2019, and began his second term on January 1, 2023. He presides over the Upshur County Misdemeanor Criminal Docket, Probate, Civil, and Commissioners Courts. Commissioner Gene Dolle is in his first term and has served Precinct One since January 1, 2021. Commissioner Dustin Nicholson began his first term as Commissioner of Precinct Two on January 1, 2019. Nicholson was elected to a second term beginning January 1, 2023. Commissioner Michael Ashley is in his first term and has served Precinct Three since January 1, 2021. Commissioner Jay Miller began his first term as Commissioner of Precinct Four on January 1, 2019. He was elected to his second term beginning January 1, 2023.

United States presidential election results for Upshur County, Texas
| Year | Republican | | Democratic | | Third party(ies) | |
| Year | No. | % | No. | % | No. | % |
|---|---|---|---|---|---|---|
| 1912 | 168 | 13.90% | 896 | 74.11% | 145 | 11.99% |
| 1916 | 198 | 11.82% | 1,346 | 80.36% | 131 | 7.82% |
| 1920 | 616 | 26.44% | 1,222 | 52.45% | 492 | 21.12% |
| 1924 | 258 | 8.86% | 2,611 | 89.69% | 42 | 1.44% |
| 1928 | 649 | 29.37% | 1,553 | 70.27% | 8 | 0.36% |
| 1932 | 129 | 4.24% | 2,900 | 95.39% | 11 | 0.36% |
| 1936 | 321 | 12.50% | 2,243 | 87.38% | 3 | 0.12% |
| 1940 | 518 | 12.96% | 3,480 | 87.04% | 0 | 0.00% |
| 1944 | 446 | 13.24% | 2,369 | 70.32% | 554 | 16.44% |
| 1948 | 555 | 17.54% | 2,118 | 66.92% | 492 | 15.55% |
| 1952 | 2,391 | 43.98% | 3,040 | 55.91% | 6 | 0.11% |
| 1956 | 2,737 | 57.45% | 1,995 | 41.88% | 32 | 0.67% |
| 1960 | 2,262 | 40.73% | 3,248 | 58.48% | 44 | 0.79% |
| 1964 | 2,222 | 35.48% | 4,027 | 64.31% | 13 | 0.21% |
| 1968 | 1,519 | 22.06% | 2,480 | 36.02% | 2,886 | 41.92% |
| 1972 | 4,736 | 71.50% | 1,879 | 28.37% | 9 | 0.14% |
| 1976 | 3,272 | 39.85% | 4,902 | 59.70% | 37 | 0.45% |
| 1980 | 4,836 | 49.09% | 4,894 | 49.68% | 122 | 1.24% |
| 1984 | 7,325 | 61.16% | 4,614 | 38.53% | 37 | 0.31% |
| 1988 | 5,991 | 53.18% | 5,242 | 46.53% | 32 | 0.28% |
| 1992 | 4,511 | 36.95% | 4,776 | 39.12% | 2,921 | 23.93% |
| 1996 | 5,174 | 45.71% | 5,032 | 44.45% | 1,114 | 9.84% |
| 2000 | 8,448 | 65.96% | 4,180 | 32.64% | 180 | 1.41% |
| 2004 | 10,232 | 70.44% | 4,225 | 29.09% | 69 | 0.48% |
| 2008 | 11,222 | 74.00% | 3,790 | 24.99% | 152 | 1.00% |
| 2012 | 12,015 | 79.37% | 2,971 | 19.63% | 152 | 1.00% |
| 2016 | 13,209 | 82.49% | 2,380 | 14.86% | 424 | 2.65% |
| 2020 | 15,809 | 83.56% | 2,877 | 15.21% | 233 | 1.23% |
| 2024 | 16,939 | 85.18% | 2,820 | 14.18% | 128 | 0.64% |

United States Senate election results for Upshur County, Texas1
| Year | Republican | | Democratic | | Third party(ies) | |
| Year | No. | % | No. | % | No. | % |
|---|---|---|---|---|---|---|
| 2024 | 16,451 | 82.92% | 2,994 | 15.09% | 394 | 1.99% |

United States Senate election results for Upshur County, Texas2
| Year | Republican | | Democratic | | Third party(ies) | |
| Year | No. | % | No. | % | No. | % |
|---|---|---|---|---|---|---|
| 2020 | 15,470 | 82.94% | 2,804 | 15.03% | 379 | 2.03% |

Texas Gubernatorial election results for Upshur County
| Year | Republican | | Democratic | | Third party(ies) | |
| Year | No. | % | No. | % | No. | % |
|---|---|---|---|---|---|---|
| 2022 | 12,270 | 86.00% | 1,856 | 13.01% | 142 | 1.00% |

== Education ==
These school districts serve Upshur County:

- Big Sandy ISD (partly in Wood County)
- Gilmer ISD
- Gladewater ISD (partly in Gregg County, partly in Upshur County)
- Harmony ISD (partly in Wood County)
- New Diana ISD (small portion in Harrison County)
- Ore City ISD (small portion in Marion counties)
- Pittsburg ISD
- Union Grove ISD (small part in Gregg County)
- Union Hill ISD (mostly in Upshur County, partly in Wood County)

The service area of Kilgore Junior College includes areas in Big Sandy, Gilmer, Gladewater, New Diana, and Union Grove ISDs. Areas in Harmony, Ore City, and Union Hill ISDs are in the service area of Northeast Texas Community College.

== Media ==
The main newspaper for Upshur County is The Gilmer Mirror. The Gladewater Mirror has been published since 1949, first, as a daily newspaper and then became a weekly newspaper.

== See also ==
- National Register of Historic Places listings in Upshur County, Texas
- Recorded Texas Historic Landmarks in Upshur County
