= Gilmer, Texas =

- City
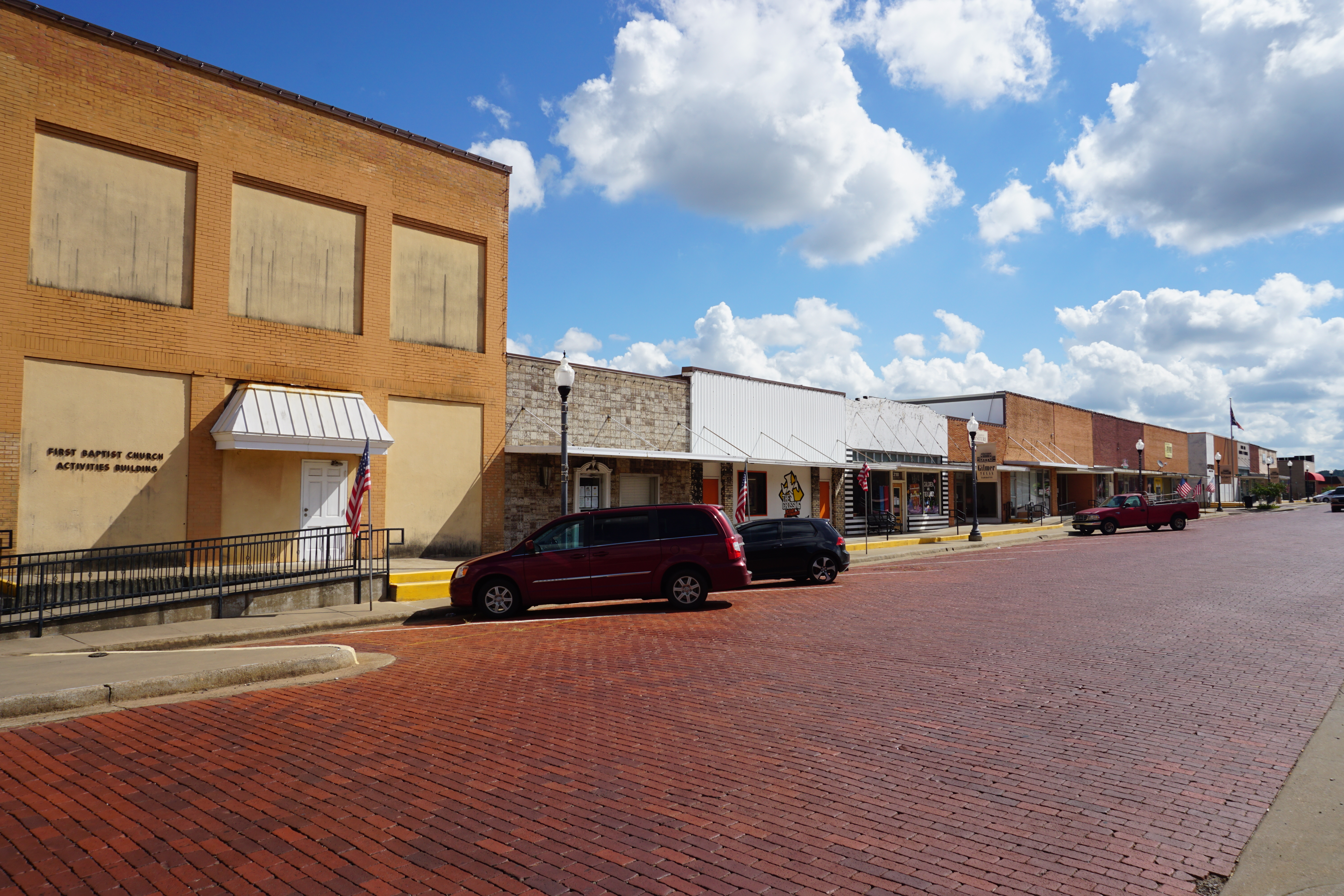
- Buffalo Street in Gilmer

- Seal
- Motto: "Finding the Way"
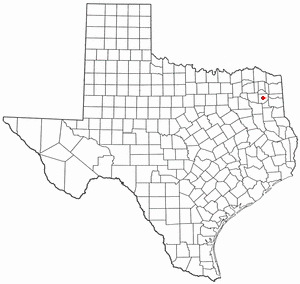
- Location of Gilmer in Texas

- Coordinates: 32°44′17″N 94°56′35″W
- Country: United States
- State: Texas
- County: Upshur

Area
  - Total: 3.80 sq mi (9.84 km^{2})
  - Land: 3.79 sq mi (9.82 km^{2})
  - Water: 0.012 sq mi (0.03 km^{2})
- Elevation: 358 ft (109 m)

Population (2020)
  - Total: 4,843
  - Density: 1,357/sq mi (523.9/km^{2})
- Time zone: UTC-6 (Central (CST))
  - Summer (DST): UTC-5 (CDT)
- ZIP Codes: 75644-75645
- Area codes: 903, 430
- FIPS code: 48-29564
- GNIS feature ID: 2410590
- Website: gilmer-tx.com

Gilmer is a city in and the county seat of Upshur County, Texas, United States. Its population was 4,843 at the 2020 census.

The East Texas Yamboree is an annual event held in Gilmer.

== History ==
Founded in 1846, the city's namesake is former Secretary of the Navy Thomas Walker Gilmer. Gilmer is located on the Old Cherokee Trace, a trail used by the Cherokee Indians in their travels. To this day, arrowheads and other Native American artifacts can be found with little to no digging. Sam Houston, when he lived with the Cherokee, traveled the trace through here. The location of Gilmer was determined by a flood on Little Cypress Creek. First located near the creek, residents decided to change locations because of frequent floods.

In 1919, during Red Summer, Chilton Jennings, a 28-year-old African American man, was lynched in Gilmer’s town square by a mob of about 1,000 White residents.

== Geography ==
According to the United States Census Bureau, the city has a total area of 4.6 mi^{2} (12.0 km^{2}), all land.

Gilmer is part of a larger area known as the East Texas Piney Woods.

=== Climate ===
The climate in this area is characterized by hot, humid summers and generally mild to cool winters. According to the Köppen climate classification, Gilmer has a humid subtropical climate, Cfa on climate maps.

Climate data for Gilmer, Texas (1991–2020 normals, extremes 1929–2012)
Month	Jan	Feb	Mar	Apr	May	Jun	Jul	Aug	Sep	Oct	Nov	Dec	Year
Record high °F (°C)	85 (29)	90 (32)	91 (33)	97 (36)	100 (38)	109 (43)	110 (43)	114 (46)	111 (44)	98 (37)	88 (31)	85 (29)	114 (46)
Mean daily maximum °F (°C)	55.6 (13.1)	60.2 (15.7)	67.0 (19.4)	74.5 (23.6)	81.6 (27.6)	88.6 (31.4)	92.6 (33.7)	92.2 (33.4)	87.4 (30.8)	77.2 (25.1)	65.5 (18.6)	57.4 (14.1)	75.0 (23.9)
Daily mean °F (°C)	44.1 (6.7)	47.7 (8.7)	54.8 (12.7)	61.9 (16.6)	70.4 (21.3)	77.9 (25.5)	81.5 (27.5)	80.8 (27.1)	74.8 (23.8)	64.3 (17.9)	53.3 (11.8)	45.7 (7.6)	63.1 (17.3)
Mean daily minimum °F (°C)	32.7 (0.4)	35.2 (1.8)	42.6 (5.9)	49.3 (9.6)	59.3 (15.2)	67.2 (19.6)	70.5 (21.4)	69.4 (20.8)	62.2 (16.8)	51.4 (10.8)	41.2 (5.1)	34.0 (1.1)	51.3 (10.7)
Record low °F (°C)	−4 (−20)	−3 (−19)	12 (−11)	25 (−4)	36 (2)	46 (8)	50 (10)	47 (8)	36 (2)	23 (−5)	13 (−11)	−4 (−20)	−4 (−20)
Average precipitation inches (mm)	3.76 (96)	4.09 (104)	4.22 (107)	4.66 (118)	4.49 (114)	4.07 (103)	3.05 (77)	3.01 (76)	3.68 (93)	4.57 (116)	3.81 (97)	4.51 (115)	47.92 (1,217)
Average snowfall inches (cm)	0.6 (1.5)	0.7 (1.8)	0.2 (0.51)	0.0 (0.0)	0.0 (0.0)	0.0 (0.0)	0.0 (0.0)	0.0 (0.0)	0.0 (0.0)	0.0 (0.0)	0.0 (0.0)	0.0 (0.0)	1.5 (3.8)
Average precipitation days (≥ 0.01 in)	7.9	7.3	7.9	6.1	7.7	7.6	5.0	4.6	5.5	5.7	6.9	8.0	80.2
Average snowy days (≥ 0.1 in)	0.2	0.3	0.1	0.0	0.0	0.0	0.0	0.0	0.0	0.0	0.0	0.0	0.6
Source: NOAA

== Demographics ==
Historical population
Census	Pop.	Note	%±
1880	386		—
1890	591		53.1%
1910	1,484		—
1920	2,268		52.8%
1930	1,963		−13.4%
1940	3,138		59.9%
1950	4,096		30.5%
1960	4,312		5.3%
1970	4,196		−2.7%
1980	5,167		23.1%
1990	4,822		−6.7%
2000	4,799		−0.5%
2010	4,905		2.2%
2020	4,843		−1.3%
U.S. Decennial Census

=== 2020 census ===
As of the 2020 census, 4,843 people and 987 families resided in the city. The median age was 38.6 years, 24.7% were under the age of 18, 19.7% were 65 years of age or older, and for every 100 females there were 86.9 males; for every 100 females age 18 and over there were 80.9 males age 18 and over.

There were 1,900 households, of which 32.3% had children under the age of 18 living in them. Of all households, 37.0% were married-couple households, 17.0% were households with a male householder and no spouse or partner present, and 39.2% were households with a female householder and no spouse or partner present. About 34.0% of all households were made up of individuals and 16.3% had someone living alone who was 65 years of age or older.

99.4% of residents lived in urban areas, while 0.6% lived in rural areas.

There were 2,125 housing units, of which 10.6% were vacant. The homeowner vacancy rate was 1.2% and the rental vacancy rate was 7.5%.

Racial composition as of the 2020 census
Race	Number	Percent
White	3,369	69.6%
Black or African American	766	15.8%
American Indian and Alaska Native	27	0.6%
Asian	38	0.8%
Native Hawaiian and Other Pacific Islander	6	0.1%
Some other race	239	4.9%
Two or more races	398	8.2%
Hispanic or Latino (of any race)	514	10.6%

=== 2000 census ===
As of the census of 2000, 4,799 people, 1,926 households, and 1,300 families resided in the city. The population density was 1,038.5 inhabitants per square mile (401.0/km^{2}). The 2,214 housing units averaged 479.1 per mi^{2} (185.0/km^{2}). The racial makeup of the city was 75.91% White, 20.23% African American, 0.35% Native American, 0.08% Asian, 0.02% Pacific Islander, 1.90% from other races, and 1.50% from two or more races. Hispanics or Latinos of any race were 4.42% of the population.

Of the 1,926 households, 30.1% had children under 18 living with them, 46.2% were married couples living together, 17.7% had a female householder with no husband present, and 32.5% were not families. About 29.9% of all households were made up of individuals, and 17.3% had someone living alone who was 65 or older. The average household size was 2.37, and the average family size was 2.93.

In the city, the population was distributed as 25.3% under 18, 7.8% from 18 to 24, 23.5% from 25 to 44, 21.6% from 45 to 64, and 21.8% who were 65 or older. The median age was 40 years. For every 100 females, there were 83.4 males. For every 100 females 18 and over, there were 76.3 males.

The median income for a household in the city was $28,487 and for a family was $39,688. Males had a median income of $32,437 versus $17,910 for females. The per capita income for the city was $16,823. About 15.9% of families and 19.1% of the population were below the poverty line, including 26.5% of those under the age of 18 and 21.0% of those 65 and older.

== Arts and culture ==
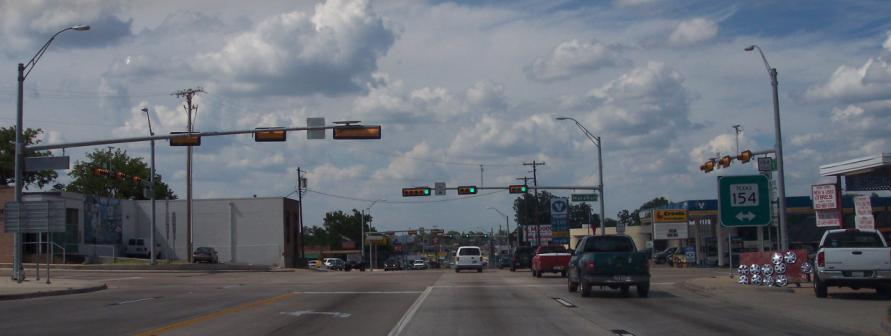
US-271 is the main highway in Gilmer

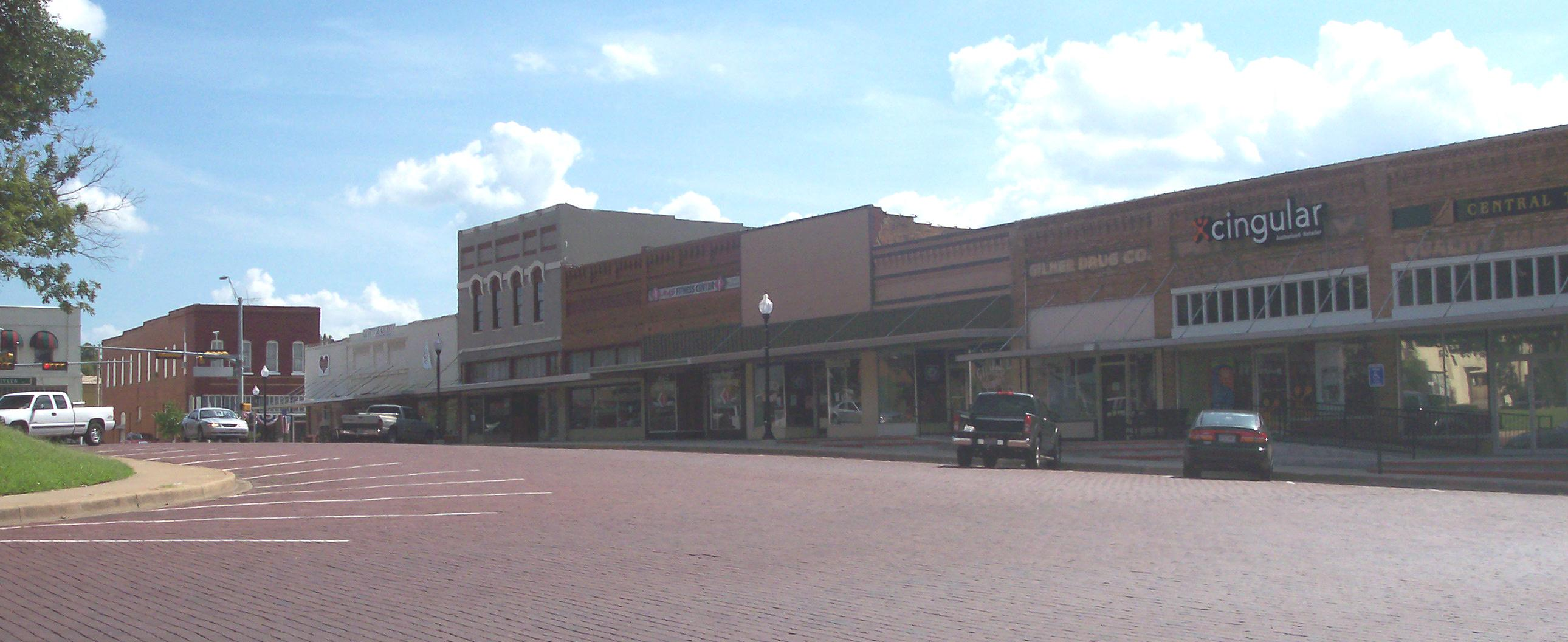
Downtown Gilmer

=== Annual events ===
The East Texas Yamboree is a celebration of the sweet potato, locally known as the yam. Established in 1935, it is one of the oldest continuous festivals in Texas, attracting over 100,000 visitors each year. Events include a pageant, carnival, parades, a dance, livestock shows, a car show, and contests.

The Upshur County Juneteenth celebration has featured a parade, live music, a car and tractor show, soul food contests, children's activities, vendor booths, and community unity programming.

== Education ==
Gilmer is served by the Gilmer Independent School District.

== Notable people ==
=== Music ===
- Don Henley, Grammy Award-winning singer-songwriter and founding member of the Eagles
- Freddie King, guitarist and singer in Blues Hall of Fame and Rock and Roll Hall of Fame
- Johnny Mathis, multiple platinum-selling popular music and standards singer; Grammy Lifetime Achievement Award
- Jason Sellers, country music singer-songwriter
- Michelle Shocked, folk singer-songwriter

=== Sports ===
- Kris Boyd, football corner back for the New York Jets
- Curtis Brown, former defensive back for the Pittsburgh Steelers
- Gus Johnson, former NFL running back
- Manuel Johnson, former wide receiver for the Dallas Cowboys
- G. J. Kinne, NFL and Canadian Football League quarterback
- Kenny Pettway, linebacker for the Edmonton Eskimos
- David Snow, offensive lineman for the Buffalo Bills and Pittsburgh Steelers
- Jeff Traylor, head football coach of UTSA
- Louis Wright, former four-time first-team All-Pro cornerback for the Denver Broncos

=== Other ===
- Chilton Jennings, lynched in Gilmer, Texas
- David Abner, an African-American Republican state representative from 1874 to 1875, he was brought to Upshur County as a slave from Selma, Alabama.
- Charles F. Baird, a former justice of the Texas Court of Criminal Appeals and former judge, Travis County District Court, he is the only judge in Texas history to preside over the exoneration of a deceased individual; he was longtime criminal-justice reform advocate.
- Robert N. McClelland was a surgeon for John F. Kennedy at Parkland Hospital in Dallas on the day of his assassination.
- Harold Moss, the first African-American mayor of Tacoma, Washington
- Thomas F. Proctor, a trainer of Thoroughbred racehorses, he won the 1994 edition of the Breeders' Cup Distaff
- Robert L. Stephens, record-setting test pilot

== In popular culture ==
- The Michelle Shocked song "Memories of East Texas" recalls her experiences growing up in Gilmer.
