= List of Farm to Market Roads in Texas (3000–3099) =

- Texas Farm to Market Road and Ranch to Market Road markers

Highway names
- Interstates: Interstate Highway X (IH-X, I-X)
- US Highways: U.S. Highway X (US X)
- State: State Highway X (SH X)
- Loops: Loop X
- Spurs: Spur X
- Recreational: Recreational Road X (RE X)
- Farm or Ranch to Market Roads: Farm to Market Road X (FM X); Ranch to Market Road X (RM X)
- Park Roads: Park Road X (PR X)

System links
- Highways in Texas; Interstate; US; State; Former; Toll; Loops; Spurs; FM/RM; Park; Rec

Farm to Market Roads in Texas are owned and maintained by the Texas Department of Transportation (TxDOT).

== FM 3000 ==
Farm to Market Road 3000
- Location: Bastrop County
- Length: 3.658 mi (5.887 km)
- Existed: May 5, 1966–present

Farm to Market Road 3000 (FM 3000) is located in Bastrop County. It begins in Elgin, at an intersection with Loop 109. It runs east approximately 3.6 miles (5.8 km) before state maintenance ends. The roadway continues as Old Lexington Road, which, along with Willow Road and CR 1202, provides access to FM 696 at the Lee County line.

Farm to Market Road 3000 was designated on May 5, 1966. It was originally designated to have a length of 4.2 miles (6.8 km).

=== FM 3000 (1965) ===
Farm to Market Road 3000
- Location: Burleson County
- Existed: June 1, 1965–August 19, 1965

The original FM 3000 was designated on June 1, 1965, to run from the end of Spur 135 southeast to SH 6. This FM 3000 was cancelled (along with Spur 135) and became a portion of FM 2818 on August 19 of that year.

== FM 3001 ==
Farm to Market Road 3001
- Location: Harrison and Marion counties
- Length: 9.668 mi (15.559 km)
- Existed: 1965–present

Farm to Market Road 3001 (FM 3001) is located in Harrison and Marion counties. It begins at FM 726 near the southeastern shores of Lake O' the Pines and continues southeastward approximately 9.9 miles to FM 1997, 6.0 miles north of Marshall.

Junction list

County	Location	mi	km	Destinations	Notes
Marion		0.0	0.0	FM 726	
Marion		5.6	9.0	FM 2208	
Harrison		9.7	15.6	FM 1997	
1.000 mi = 1.609 km; 1.000 km = 0.621 mi

== FM 3002 ==
Farm to Market Road 3002
- Location: Cooke County
- Length: 8.497 mi (13.675 km)
- Existed: November 16, 1981–present

Farm to Market Road 3002 (FM 3002) is located in southern Cooke County. The highway is signed as Lone Oak Road. It was designated on November 16, 1981, along its current route.

FM 3002 begins at Interstate 35 and continues eastward. The road crosses two arms of Lake Ray Roberts. Shortly after where it passes the entrance to the Johnson Branch Unit of Lake Ray Roberts State Park, the road changes direction to northeastward. FM 3002 ends at an intersection with FM 372; the road itself continues northward as FM 372 (the southern stretch of FM 372 branches off at this point).

Junction list

The entire route is in Cooke County.

Location	mi	km	Destinations	Notes
Valley View	0.0	0.0	I-35 (US 77) – Denton, Gainesville	I-35 exit 483
	2.0	3.2	Bridge over Lake Ray Roberts	
	5.8	9.3	FM 3442 south	
	8.5	13.7	FM 372	
1.000 mi = 1.609 km; 1.000 km = 0.621 mi

=== FM 3002 (1965) ===
Farm to Market Road 3002
- Location: Galveston County
- Existed: June 1, 1965–April 15, 1980

A previous route numbered FM 3002 was designated on June 1, 1965, from I-45, 2.6 miles (4.2 km) south of FM 518, northeast to FM 1266. On December 18, 1979, the road was extended east to FM 517 (now FM 3436). FM 3002 was cancelled on April 15, 1980, and transferred to FM 646.

== FM 3003 ==
Farm to Market Road 3003
- Location: Young County
- Length: 4.958 mi (7.979 km)
- Existed: 1965–present

Farm to Market Road 3003 (FM 3003) is located in Young County. It begins from FM 61, west of Lake Graham and continues north 5.3 miles.

== FM 3004 ==
Farm to Market Road 3004
- Location: Lipscomb County
- Length: 7.321 mi (11.782 km)
- Existed: 1966–present

Farm to Market Road 3004 (FM 3004) is located in Lipscomb County. It begins from FM 1454 9.0 miles south of Follett and continues east 7.3 miles to the Texas/Oklahoma State Line.

== FM 3005 ==
Farm to Market Road 3005
- Location: Galveston County
- Length: 22.003 mi (35.410 km)
- Existed: 1966–present

Farm to Market Road 3005 (FM 3005) is located in Galveston County. FM 3005 has a western terminus at the approach to the bridge over San Luis Pass; the bridge connects to the Bluewater Highway (County Road 257) on the Brazoria County side. It travels to the northeast along Termini–San Luis Pass Road, through Galveston (and briefly Jamaica Beach), crossing Galveston Island State Park. It passes Scholes International Airport before entering the Galveston central business district. Beginning near Cove View Boulevard, the route is signed as Seawall Boulevard, as it runs alongside the Galveston Seawall. The FM 3005 designation ends at Spur 342 (61st Street), which provides access to I-45. Seawall Boulevard continues under county maintenance to SH 87 on the eastern side of the island.

FM 3005 was first designated in Galveston County on March 31, 1966; its western terminus was at 13 Mile Road. The route was lengthened to the boundary of Galveston Island State Park on February 1, 1972, and through the park and to the San Luis Pass Toll Bridge on February 24, 1988. The designation was changed to Urban Road 3005 (UR 3005) on June 27, 1995. The designation reverted to FM 3005 with the elimination of the Urban Road system on November 15, 2018.

Junction list

The entire route is in Galveston County.

Location	mi	km	Destinations	Notes
Galveston	0.0	0.0	San Luis Pass-Vacek Bridge	Road continues west into Brazoria County as County Road 257 (Bluewater Highway)
Jamaica Beach			No major intersections	
Galveston	11.9	19.2	PR 66 – Galveston Island State Park	
Galveston	21.3	34.3	Spur 342 north (61st Street) to I-45 north	Eastern terminus; road continues east of Spur 342's southern terminus as Seawall Boulevard
1.000 mi = 1.609 km; 1.000 km = 0.621 mi

== FM 3006 ==
Farm to Market Road 3006
- Location: Atascosa County
- Length: 4.017 mi (6.465 km)
- Existed: 1966–present

Farm to Market Road 3006 (FM 3006) is located in Atascosa County. It begins from US 281 north of Pleasanton and continues northeast 4.0 miles to Interstate 37, 2.3 miles west of Verdi.

== FM 3007 ==
Farm to Market Road 3007
- Location: Franklin County
- Length: 5.971 mi (9.609 km)
- Existed: 1967–present

Farm to Market Road 3007 (FM 3007) is located in Franklin County. It begins from FM 115 eastward and northward approximately 6.0 miles to FM 21, with a spur connection of 0.242 miles from a point approximately 1.0 mile northeast of FM 115, northward to Lake Cypress Springs.

Junction list

The entire route is in Franklin County.

Location	mi	km	Destinations	Notes
	0.0	0.0	FM 115 – Mount Vernon	
	1.1	1.8	FM Spur 3007 north	
	4.3	6.9	FM 3122 west / County Road 4210	
	6.0	9.7	FM 21	
1.000 mi = 1.609 km; 1.000 km = 0.621 mi

=== FM 3007 (1966) ===
Farm to Market Road 3007
- Location: Comal County
- Existed: May 5, 1966–June 12, 1967

FM 3007 was first designated on May 5, 1966, running from FM 484 to Cranes Mill Road. On June 12, 1967, this FM 3007 was cancelled and combined with FM 306.

== RM 3008 ==
Ranch to Market Road 3008
- Location: Kinney County
- Length: 13.015 mi (20.946 km)
- Existed: 1966–present

Ranch to Market Road 3008 (RM 3008) is located in Kinney County. It continues from US 90, 12.0 miles west of Brackettville and heads northward approximately 13.4 miles to RM 2523.

== FM 3009 ==
Farm to Market Road 3009
- Location: Comal and Guadalupe counties
- Length: 17.062 mi (27.459 km)
- Existed: 1966–present

Farm to Market Road 3009 (FM 3009) is located in Comal and Guadalupe counties. The southern terminus of FM 3009 is in Schertz, at an intersection with FM 78. The route travels in a generally northwesterly direction along four-lane Roy Richard Drive, one of the major north–south thoroughfares in Schertz. FM 3009 crosses I-35 at its exit 175; past this point, the road is known as Natural Bridge Caverns Road. The route enters Garden Ridge, where it crosses FM 2252 and becomes a two-lane road. Outside of Garden Ridge, FM 3009 passes Natural Bridge Caverns and doglegs to the northeast before meeting FM 1863 in the outskirts of Bulverde. FM 3009 continues north through unincorporated Comal County before ending at a junction with SH 46.

FM 3009 was designated on May 5, 1966; the original route was the section in Schertz, from FM 78 to I-35. It was extended to FM 1337 (which was later redesignated as part of FM 2252) on November 5, 1971, to 2.3 miles (3.7 km) northwest on November 3, 1972, to 0.9 miles (1.4 km) northwest of there on April 4, 1974, to FM 1863 on November 25, 1975, and to SH 46 on October 26, 1983. The portion from FM 2252 to FM 78 was redesignated as Urban Road 3009 (UR 3009) on June 27, 1995. The designation of this section reverted to FM 3009 with the elimination of the Urban Road System on November 15, 2018.

Junction list

County	Location	mi	km	Destinations	Notes
Guadalupe	Schertz	0.0	0.0	FM 78 (John E. Peterson Boulevard)	Southern terminus
Guadalupe	Schertz	3.2	5.1	I-35 – San Antonio, New Braunfels	I-35 exit 175
Comal	Garden Ridge	5.0	8.0	FM 2252 to FM 482 – Bracken	
Comal		12.9	20.8	FM 1863 to SH 46 – Bulverde	
Comal		17.1	27.5	SH 46 – Boerne, Canyon Lake, New Braunfels	Northern terminus
1.000 mi = 1.609 km; 1.000 km = 0.621 mi

== FM 3010 ==
Farm to Market Road 3010
- Location: DeWitt County
- Length: 3.681 mi (5.924 km)
- Existed: 1966–present

Farm to Market Road 3010 (FM 3010) is located in DeWitt County. It starts from FM 682, 2.9 miles southwest of SH 111 in Yoakum and continues southwestward a distance of 3.5 miles.

== FM 3011 ==
Farm to Market Road 3011
- Location: Fayette County
- Length: 3.25 mi (5.23 km)
- Existed: 1966–present

Farm to Market Road 3011 (FM 3011) is located in Fayette County. It begins at FM 2145, 0.6 mile southwest of Nechanitz and continues west 4.1 miles to a road intersection.

== FM 3012 ==
Farm to Market Road 3012
- Location: Wharton County
- Length: 6.13 mi (9.87 km)
- Existed: 1966–present

Farm to Market Road 3012 (FM 3012) is located in Wharton County. It begins southeast of Wharton and continues southeast to FM 1096, south of Iago.

== FM 3013 ==
Farm to Market Road 3013
- Location: Wharton, Colorado, and Austin counties
- Length: 22.048 mi (35.483 km)
- Existed: February 29, 1968–present

Farm to Market Road 3013 (FM 3013) is located in Wharton, Colorado, and Austin counties. It runs from FM 102 north and northeast via Eagle Lake to SH 36.

FM 3013 was designated on February 29, 1968, from I-10 at Sealy southwest 15.3 miles (24.6 km) to FM 1093 at Eagle Lake. On June 12, 1968, the northern terminus was moved south to SH 36, shortening the route by 0.5 miles (0.80 km). On January 25, 1971, the road was extended southwest to US 90 Alt. at Eagle Lake, replacing a section of FM 1093. On September 9, 1973, FM 3013 was extended south 6.4 miles (10.3 km) to FM 102.

Junction list

County	Location	mi	km	Destinations	Notes
Wharton		0.0	0.0	FM 102	
Colorado	Eagle Lake	6.3	10.1	US 90 Alt. – Eagle Lake, East Bernard	
Colorado	Eagle Lake	7.2	11.6	FM 1093 east – Wallis	
Austin		19.7	31.7	FM 3538 north	
Austin		22.1	35.6	SH 36 – Sealy, Wallis	
1.000 mi = 1.609 km; 1.000 km = 0.621 mi

=== FM 3013 (1966) ===
Farm to Market Road 3013
- Location: Jackson County
- Existed: May 5, 1966–January 16, 1968

A previous route numbered FM 3013 was designated in Jackson County on May 5, 1966. The highway ran from FM 1822 (this section is now part of FM 3131) to FM 1593 near Lolita. On January 16, 1968, this FM 3013 was deleted from the highway system due to construction of Lake Texana. In exchange, the then-new FM 3131 was created.

== RM 3014 ==
Ranch to Market Road 3014
- Location: Llano County
- Length: 2.38 mi (3.83 km)
- Existed: 1966–present

Ranch to Market Road 3014 (RM 3014) is located in Llano County. It begins at RM 2241, south of Tow, and continues east to near Lake Buchanan.

== FM 3015 ==
Farm to Market Road 3015
- Location: Travis County
- Existed: May 5, 1966–July 11, 1986

Farm to Market Road 3015 (FM 3015) was located in Austin. The highway was designated on May 5, 1966. The highway began at US 290 and ran northeast via Cameron Road for approximately 0.9 miles (1.4 km) to Loop 111, which became part of US 183 one month later. On July 11, 1986, FM 3015 was cancelled with maintenance being turned over to the city of Austin.

No highway currently uses the FM 3015 designation.

== FM 3016 ==
Farm to Market Road 3016
- Location: Houston County
- Length: 4.404 mi (7.088 km)
- Existed: 1966–present

Farm to Market Road 3016 (FM 3016) is located in Houston county. It begins at FM 227 west of SH 21 and continues northwest to FM 228 near the Anderson county line.

== FM 3017 ==
Farm to Market Road 3017
- Location: San Augustine County
- Length: 1.3 mi (2.1 km)
- Existed: 1966–present

Farm to Market Road 3017 (FM 3017) is located in San Augustine county. It begins at FM 711 southeast of the Shelby County Line and continues north a distance of 1.3 miles (2.1 km).

== FM 3018 ==
Farm to Market Road 3018
- Location: San Jacinto County
- Length: 2.503 mi (4.028 km)
- Existed: 1966–present

Farm to Market Road 3018 (FM 3018) is located in San Jacinto county. It begins at FM 946 south of Oakhurst and continues southwest and east 2.503 miles (4.028 km).

== FM 3019 ==
Farm to Market Road 3019
- Location: Hopkins County
- Length: 9.219 mi (14.837 km)
- Existed: 1966–present

Farm to Market Road 3019 (FM 3019) is located in Hopkins county. It begins at SH 11 near the Franklin County Line and continues north to FM 900 at Greenwood.

== FM 3020 ==
Farm to Market Road 3020
- Location: Lubbock County
- Length: 2.689 mi (4.328 km)
- Existed: November 26, 1969–present

Farm to Market Road 3020 (FM 3020) is located in Lubbock County.

FM 3020 begins at an intersection with Spur 331 near US 84 in southeastern Lubbock. The highway travels in an eastern direction, passes near a large livestock area and the Jones Station Power Plant, then ends at an intersection with FM 835 near Buffalo Springs.

The current FM 3020 was designated on November 26, 1969, along its current route when a section of County Road 7100 was upgraded.

=== FM 3020 (1966) ===
Farm to Market Road 3020
- Location: Hunt County
- Existed: May 5, 1966–September 3, 1968

FM 3020 was designated on May 5, 1966, from FM 903 eastward to US 69. The highway was cancelled on September 3, 1968, and combined with FM 2194.

== FM 3021 ==
Farm to Market Road 3021
- Location: Brown County
- Length: 3.412 mi (5.491 km)
- Existed: 1966–present

Farm to Market Road 3021 (FM 3021) is located in Brown county. It begins at SH 279 northwest of Brownwood and continues east, south, and east to FM 2632.

== FM 3022 ==
Farm to Market Road 3022
- Location: McCulloch County
- Length: 8.438 mi (13.580 km)
- Existed: 1966–present

Farm to Market Road 3022 (FM 3022) is located in McCulloch county. It begins at US 87 west of Brady and continues southeast to FM 2028.

== FM 3023 ==
Farm to Market Road 3023
- Location: Mills County
- Length: 5.025 mi (8.087 km)
- Existed: 1966–present

Farm to Market Road 3023 (FM 3023) is located in Mills county. It begins at FM 574 west of Goldthwaite and continues south 5.025 miles (8.087 km).

== FM 3024 ==
Farm to Market Road 3024
- Location: Live Oak and San Patricio counties
- Length: 12.827 mi (20.643 km)
- Existed: 1971–present

Farm to Market Road 3024 (FM 3024) is located in Live Oak and San Patricio counties. It begins at Interstate 37 near FM 534 and continues southeast to SH 359 in Mathis.

=== FM 3024 (1966) ===
Farm to Market Road 3024
- Location: Cochran County
- Existed: May 5, 1966–May 18, 1970

A previous route numbered FM 3024 was designated in Cochran County on May 5, 1966, from FM 769 east to SH 214. On May 7, 1970, the road was extended east to FM 1780. Eleven days later, FM 3024 was cancelled with the mileage being transferred to FM 1585.

== FM 3025 ==
Farm to Market Road 3025
- Location: Erath County
- Length: 8.104 mi (13.042 km)
- Existed: 1966–present

Farm to Market Road 3025 (FM 3025) is located in Erath county. It begins at FM 2303 at Pigeon and continues northeast 8.104 miles (13.042 km) to US 281.

== FM 3026 ==
Farm to Market Road 3026
- Location: Runnels County
- Length: 0.967 mi (1,556 m)
- Existed: 1970–present

Farm to Market Road 3026 (FM 3026) is located in Runnels county. It begins at FM 2111 south of Valley View and continues east 0.967 miles (1.556 m) to SH 158.

=== FM 3026 (1966) ===
Farm to Market Road 3026
- Location: Hood County
- Existed: May 5, 1966–November 26, 1969

FM 3026 was first designated on May 5, 1966. The highway ran from FM 1190 (now FM 167) eastward 3.5 miles (5.6 km) to near Falls Creek. On November 26, 1969, FM 3026 was cancelled with the mileage being transferred to FM 1192 (later FM 208, now FM 4).

== FM 3027 ==
Farm to Market Road 3027
- Location: Palo Pinto County
- Length: 4.491 mi (Note: The certified length given is shorter than the actual mileage, as the Texas Department of Transportation description of FM 3027 considers it to be discontinuous at rather than concurrent with US 281 in Mineral Wells.) (7.228 km)
- Existed: 1966–present

Farm to Market Road 3027 (FM 3027) is located in Palo Pinto county.

The highway begins at the intersection of Turkey Creek and Union Hill Roads, with the roadway continuing west along the former. FM 3027 travels in a southeastern direction to Mineral Wells and has an overlap with US 281 in the northern part of town. Leaving US 281, FM 3027 travels along Northeast 23rd Street before ending at an intersection with FM 1821.

FM 3027 was designated in 1966 from US 281 on the north edge of Mineral Wells to a point 3.1 miles (5.0 km) northwest. In 1970, the highway was extended along Northeast 23rd Street in Mineral Wells to FM 1821, creating an overlap with US 281 in the process. The FM 3027 designation was extended westward to SH 337 in 1987 along Turkey Creek Road; however, Turkey Creek Road has not been upgraded and still remains a county road.

Junction list

The entire route is in Palo Pinto County.

Location	mi	km	Destinations	Notes
	0.0	0.0	Turkey Creek Road, Union Hill Road	Western terminus; road continues as Turkey Creek Road
Mineral Wells	2.7	4.3	US 281 north – Perrin	West end of US 281 overlap
Mineral Wells	3.3	5.3	US 281 south (North Oak Avenue) – Mineral Wells	East end of US 281 overlap
Mineral Wells	5.1	8.2	FM 1821	
1.000 mi = 1.609 km; 1.000 km = 0.621 mi: Concurrency terminus

== FM 3028 ==
Farm to Market Road 3028
- Location: Palo Pinto and Parker counties
- Length: 3.539 mi (5.695 km)
- Existed: 1966–present

Farm to Market Road 3028 (FM 3028) is located in Palo Pinto and Parker counties. It begins at FM 1195 and continues southeast 3.539 miles (5.695 km) to FM 113 in Millsap.

== FM 3029 ==
Farm to Market Road 3029
- Location: Tarrant County
- Length: 4.993 mi (8.035 km)
- Existed: 1966–present

Farm to Market Road 3029 (FM 3029) is located in Hurst and North Richland Hills, just northeast of Fort Worth, in Tarrant County. It is known locally as Precinct Line Road.

FM 3029 begins at SH 121/SH 183 (Airport Freeway) in Hurst; the Precinct Line Road name continues south of here. After an intersection with Harwood Road, the highway passes along the eastern edge of the northeast campus of Tarrant County College. After crossing SH 26 (Grapevine Highway), FM 3029 runs along the city line between North Richland Hills and Hurst. Near the intersection with Mid-Cities Boulevard, the highway passes by the Birdville ISD administration building and Birdville High School. After the intersection witGlade Road, FM 3029 crosses over the Cotton Belt Trail, the Trinity Metro commuter train route, TEXRail, and sees less development along its route. Just north of here, FM 3029 runs along the city line between North Richland Hills and Colleyville. FM 3029 ends at an intersection with FM 1938 near Keller.

FM 3029 was designated on May 5, 1966, along its current route. On June 27, 1995, the entire route was redesignated Urban Road 3029 (UR 3029). The designation reverted to FM 3029 with the elimination of the Urban Road system on November 15, 2018.

Junction list

The entire route is in Tarrant County.

Location	mi	km	Destinations	Notes
Hurst	0.0	0.0	SH 121 / SH 183 (Airport Freeway)	
Hurst	1.2	1.9	SH 26 (Grapevine Highway)	
North Richland Hills	5.0	8.0	FM 1938 (Davis Boulevard)	
1.000 mi = 1.609 km; 1.000 km = 0.621 mi

== FM 3030 ==
Farm to Market Road 3030
- Location: Briscoe County
- Length: 3.925 mi (6.317 km)
- Existed: 1966–present

Farm to Market Road 3030 (FM 3030) is located in Briscoe county. It begins at SH 86 west of Silverton and continues north and east 3.925 miles (6.317 km).

== FM 3031 ==
Farm to Market Road 3031
- Location: Childress County
- Length: 3.785 mi (6.091 km)
- Existed: 1966–present

Farm to Market Road 3031 (FM 3031) is located in Childress county. It begins at FM 164 at Avenue B and 5th Street in Childress and continues south 3.785 miles (6.091 km).

== FM 3032 ==
Farm to Market Road 3032
- Location: Hall County
- Length: 4.379 mi (7.047 km)
- Existed: 1966–present

Farm to Market Road 3032 (FM 3032) is located in Hall county. It begins at FFM 1619 east of US 287 and continues north, west, and north 4.379 miles (7.047 km) to SH 256.

== FM 3033 ==
Farm to Market Road 3033
- Location: Martin County
- Length: 9.181 mi (14.775 km)
- Existed: 1966–present

Farm to Market Road 3033 (FM 3033) is located in Martin county. It begins at FM 87 west of the Howard county line and continues southeast 9.181 miles (14.775 km) to US 80.

== FM 3034 ==
Farm to Market Road 3034
- Location: Jones County
- Length: 2.218 mi (3.570 km)
- Existed: 1966–present

Farm to Market Road 3034 (FM 3034) is located in Jones County. It runs from US 83/US 277 eastward to FM 600 in Abilene near Lake Fort Phantom Hill.

FM 3034 was designated on May 5, 1966, along the current route. On June 27, 1995, the entire route was redesignated Urban Road 3034 (UR 3034). The designation reverted to FM 3034 with the elimination of the Urban Road system on November 15, 2018.

== FM 3035 ==
Farm to Market Road 3035
- Location: Refugio County
- Length: 2.124 mi (3.418 km)
- Existed: 1966–present

Farm to Market Road 3035 (FM 3035) is located in Refugio county. It begins at SH 239 northwest of Austwell and continues south 2.124 miles (3.418 km) to FM 1684.

== FM 3036 ==
Farm to Market Road 3036
- Location: Aransas County
- Length: 0.641 mi (1,032 m)
- Existed: 1966–present

Farm to Market Road 3036 (FM 3036) is located in Aransas county. It is concurrent with SH 35, from FM 1781 in Fulton, and continues east 0.641 miles (1.032 km) to BS 35-L.

== FM 3037 ==
Farm to Market Road 3037
- Location: Refugio County
- Length: 2.016 mi (3.244 km)
- Existed: 1966–present

Farm to Market Road 3037 (FM 3037) is located in Refugio county. It begins at FM 629 north of Bonnie View and continues west 2.016 miles (3.244 km) to FM 1360.

== FM 3038 ==
Farm to Market Road 3038
- Location: Collin County
- Length: 1.65 mi (2.66 km)
- Existed: May 5, 1966–August 25, 2016

Farm to Market Road 3038 (FM 3038) was located in McKinney and traveled along Virginia Parkway. FM 3038 was designated on May 5, 1966, from US 75 westward to 0.5 miles (0.80 km) west of Wilson Creek at Hardin Boulevard. On August 25, 2016, FM 3038 was cancelled and turned over to the city of McKinney.

No highway currently uses the FM 3038 designation.

== FM 3039 ==
Farm to Market Road 3039
- Location: Kaufman County
- Length: 4.033 mi (6.490 km)
- Existed: 1966–present

Farm to Market Road 3039 (FM 3039) is located in Kaufman County.

FM 3039 begins at an intersection with FM 1389 in Combine. The highway travels in a northeast direction and passes near a residential area, leaving the town near the East Fork Trinity River. FM 3039 continues to travel in a northeast direction and passes through rural areas, entering Crandall near Crandall High School. In Crandall, the highway is known as Lewis Street and runs in a more eastern direction, ending at an intersection with FM 148.

FM 3039 was designated on May 5, 1966, running from FM 148 at Crandall southwestward at a distance of 1.3 miles (2.1 km). The highway was extended 2.7 miles (4.3 km) to FM 1389 on July 11, 1968. When the FM 148 bypass east of Crandall (legislated on August 16, 2023) is built, FM 3039 will be extended southeast over the existing route of FM 148 to the bypass.

== FM 3040 ==
Farm to Market Road 3040
- Location: Denton County
- Length: 6.043 mi (9.725 km)
- Existed: 1966–present

Farm to Market Road 3040 (FM 3040) runs 6 miles (9.7 km) from Flower Mound to Lewisville in Denton County. FM 3040 begins at the intersection of FM 2499 and Flower Mound Road in Flower Mound. It travels eastward along Flower Mound Road, passing by the town's namesake, into Lewisville, where it is known as Round Grove Road. It crosses Bus. SH 121 and passes Vista Ridge Mall before ending at I-35E exit 448B.

FM 3040 was designated on May 5, 1966, from FM 2499 eastward to SH 121 (now Bus. SH 121) in Lewisville. It was extended to I-35E on June 2, 1967. On June 27, 1995, the entire route was redesignated Urban Road 3040 (UR 3040). The designation reverted to FM 3040 with the elimination of the Urban Road system on November 15, 2018.

Junction list

The entire route is in Denton County.

Location	mi	km	Destinations	Notes
Flower Mound	0.0	0.0	FM 2499 (Long Prairie Road) – Grapevine, Highland Village	Western terminus; continues as Flower Mound Road under local jurisdiction
Lewisville	4.7	7.6	Bus. SH 121 – Coppell	
Lewisville	1.3	2.1	I-35E (Stemmons Freeway) / US 77 – Dallas, Denton	Eastern terminus; continues as Hebron Parkway under local jurisdiction
1.000 mi = 1.609 km; 1.000 km = 0.621 mi

== FM 3041 ==
Farm to Market Road 3041
- Location: Navarro County
- Length: 6.156 mi (9.907 km)
- Existed: 1966–present

Farm to Market Road 3041 (FM 3041) is located in Navarro county. It begins at Interstate 45 near Corsicana and continues northeast 6.156 miles (9.907 km) to Roane.

== FM 3042 ==
Farm to Market Road 3042
- Location: Camp County
- Length: 3.679 mi (5.921 km)
- Existed: 1966–present

Farm to Market Road 3042 (FM 3042) is located in Camp county. It begins at FM 556 in Pittsburg and continues west 3.679 miles (5.921 km) to County Road 3104 near Leesburg.

== FM 3043 ==
Farm to Market Road 3043
- Location: Montague County
- Length: 4.925 mi (7.926 km)
- Existed: 1966–present

Farm to Market Road 3043 (FM 3043) is located in Montague County. FM 3043 begins at US 81 in Bowie. The route runs to the northeast along Pelham Street, past Pelham Park, before turning to the southeast along East Nelson Street. It leaves Bowie and enters the farming areas east of the city along Brushy Creek. State maintenance and the FM 3043 designation end near the intersection of Orchard and Lama Roads.

FM 3043 was designated along its current route on May 5, 1966, from US 287 (then concurrent with US 81) in Bowie to its current southern terminus. As US 287 was moved to a freeway west of the city in 1980, FM 3043 no longer intersects that route.

== FM 3044 ==
Farm to Market Road 3044
- Location: Hemphill County
- Length: 3.223 mi (5.187 km)
- Existed: 1966–present

Farm to Market Road 3044 (FM 3044) is located in Hemphill county. It begins at US 83 south of SH 33 and continues east 3.223 miles (5.187 km).

== FM 3045 ==
Farm to Market Road 3045
- Location: Ochiltree County
- Length: 8.526 mi (13.721 km)
- Existed: 1966–present

Farm to Market Road 3045 (FM 3045) is located in Ochiltree county. It begins at FM 376 and continues east 8.526 miles (13.721 km) to SH 70 southwest of US 83.

== FM 3046 ==
Farm to Market Road 3046
- Location: Lampasas and Coryell counties
- Length: 2.157 mi (3.471 km)
- Existed: 1966–present

Farm to Market Road 3046 (FM 3046) is located in Lampasas and Coryell counties. It begins at RM 2657 south of US 190 and continues northeast 2.157 miles (3.471 km) to FM 116, south of Copperas Cove.

== FM 3047 ==
Farm to Market Road 3047
- Location: McLennan County
- Length: 9.451 mi (15.210 km)
- Existed: 1966–present

Farm to Market Road 3047 (FM 3047) is located in McLennan county. It begins at SH 317 at McGregor and continues northeast and southeast 9.451 miles (15.210 km).

== FM 3048 ==
Farm to Market Road 3048
- Location: Johnson County
- Length: 3.774 mi (6.074 km)
- Existed: 1976–present

Farm to Market Road 3048 (FM 3048) is located in Johnson county. It begins at SH 174 south of Joshua and continues east to FM 2280.

=== FM 3048 (1966) ===
Farm to Market Road 3048
- Location: Hamilton County
- Existed: May 5, 1966–December 29, 1975

FM 3048 was originally designated on May 5, 1966, running from FM 219 to the Hamilton–Comanche county line. On December 29, 1975, the highway was cancelled and combined with FM 2823.

== FM 3049 ==
Farm to Market Road 3049
- Location: Hill County
- Length: 3.048 mi (4.905 km)
- Existed: 1966–present

Farm to Market Road 3049 (FM 3049) is located in Hill county. It begins at FM 934 east of FM 933 and continues northwest 3.048 miles (4.905 km) to FM 67.

== FM 3050 ==
Farm to Market Road 3050
- Location: Hill County
- Length: 3.149 mi (5.068 km)
- Existed: 1966–present

Farm to Market Road 3050 (FM 3050) is located in Hill county. It begins at SH 22 west of Peoria and continues northwest.

== FM 3051 ==
Farm to Market Road 3051
- Location: McLennan County
- Length: 6.153 mi (9.902 km)
- Existed: 1966–present

Farm to Market Road 3051 (FM 3051) is located in McLennan County.

FM 3051 begins at the entrance to Waco Regional Airport in Waco. The highway travels in an eastern direction, interacting FM 1637, and continuing along Steinbeck Bend Drive through the Bosqueville neighborhood, passing the Waco Mammoth National Monument. At M.L.K. Jr. Boulevard, FM 3051 turns right onto Lake Shore Drive. The highway runs parallel to the Brazos River before crossing the river and intersecting FM 933. Just east of FM 933, FM 3051 enters the town of Lacy Lakeview where it is known as Industrial Boulevard. The highway ends at Bus. US 77 and Loop 340.

FM 3051 was designated on May 5, 1966, replacing the FM 933 spur connection from US 81 (this section became Loop 491 on October 2, 1970, now Bus. US 77) to FM 933, and continued on a new alignment to FM 1637. The designation was extended southwest to the airport entrance on June 11, 1968. On June 27, 1995, the entire route was redesignated Urban Road 3051 (UR 3051). The designation reverted to FM 3051 with the elimination of the Urban Road system on November 15, 2018.

Junction list

The entire route is in McLennan County.

Location	mi	km	Destinations	Notes
Waco	0.0	0.0	FM 1637 (China Spring Road) / Steinbeck Bend Road – Waco, China Spring, Regional Airport	Western terminus; continues west as Steinbeck Bend Road
Waco	4.6	7.4	Bridge over the Brazos River	
Waco	5.1	8.2	FM 933 (Gholson Road)	
Lacy Lakeview	5.7	9.2	Bus. US 77 (New Dallas Highway) / Loop 340 east	Eastern terminus; continues east as Loop 340
1.000 mi = 1.609 km; 1.000 km = 0.621 mi

== FM 3052 ==
Farm to Market Road 3052
- Location: Cherokee County
- Length: 3.33 mi (5.36 km)
- Existed: 1966–present

Farm to Market Road 3052 (FM 3052) is located in north-central Cherokee County. It begins at FM 177 in Mixon and runs northward approximately 3.3 miles (5.3 km) through unincorporated Cherokee County before state maintenance ends at the Smith County line. The roadway continues as Mixon Road under Smith County jurisdiction.

FM 3052 was designated on June 10, 1966, along the current route.

== FM 3053 ==
Farm to Market Road 3053
- Location: Rusk and Gregg counties
- Length: 11.531 mi (18.557 km)
- Existed: May 5, 1966–present

Farm to Market Road 3053 (FM 3053) is a 11.531-mile (18.557 km) state road in Rusk and Gregg counties. It runs from Farm to Market Road 850 (FM 850) in Overton north to Interstate 20 (I-20) on southern edge of Liberty City.

Route description

FM 3053 begins at a T intersection with FM 850 (West Henderson Street) on the western edge of the downtown area in Overton. (FM 850 heads east to shortly end at Texas State Highway 135 (SH 135) and heads west toward Tyler.) From its southern terminus FM 3053 proceeds north along North Motley Drive for about 1.5 miles (2.4 km) before leaving the city limits of Overton. Roughly four miles (6.4 km) farther north, after passing just west of the unincorporated community of Red Level, FM 3053 reaches its junction with the west end of Farm to Market Road 1639 (FM 1639) and County Road 1111 (CR 1111) northeast of Florey Lake. (Northbound FM 2639 heads east toward Texas State Highway 31 (SH 31) and Kilgore. CR 1111 initially heads west, along the north side of Lake Florey, then turns south toward Overton.)

From its junction with FM 1639, FM 3053 continues north for about 1.5 miles (2.4 km) before crossing Old Highway 31 (the former Routing of SH 31) and then reaching its junction with SH 31 (current routing) roughly 0.4 miles (0.64 km) later. (SH 31 heads east toward Kilgore and Longview and heads west toward Tyler and Athens.) Approximately 3.6 miles (5.8 km) north-northwest of SH 31, FM 3053 reaches Old Highway 135 (the former routing of SH 135) at a T intersection. (Old Highway 135 heads southeast toward Kilgore.) Proceeding north-northwest along Old Highway 135, FM 3053 quickly reaches its northern terminus at a diamond interchange with I-20 (exit 582) on the southern city limits of Liberty City. (I-20 heads east toward Kilgore, Longview, and Shreveport, Louisiana and heads west toward Terrell and Dallas.)

History

FM 3053 was designated on May 5, 1966, from I-20 to Farm to Market Road 1639 (FM 1639). On January 31, 1972, it was extended south to FM 850, replacing the southern section of FM 1639.

Junction list

County	Location	mi	km	Destinations	Notes
Rusk	Overton	0.000	0.000	FM 850 (Henderson St)	Southern terminus; T intersection
Rusk		5.6	9.0	FM 1639 north – SH 31, Kilgore; CR 1111 south	Northbound FM 1639 heads east and southbound CR 1111 initially heads west
Gregg		7.0	11.3	Old Highway 31 east – FM 1639, SH 31; Old Highway 31 west – SH 31 and FM 2767	Former routing of SH 31
Gregg		7.4	11.9	SH 31 east – Kilgore, Longview SH 31 west – Tyler, Athens	
Gregg		11.3	18.2	Old Highway 135 south – Kilgore	T intersection; former routing of SH 135
Gregg	Liberty City	11.4– 11.531	18.3– 18.557	I-20 east – Kilgore, Longview, Shreveport (Louisiana) I-20 west – Terrell, Dallas	Northern terminus; diamond interchange; I-20 exit 582
Gregg	Liberty City	11.4– 11.531	18.3– 18.557	Old Highway 135 north – Gladewater	Continuation north from northern terminus
1.000 mi = 1.609 km; 1.000 km = 0.621 mi

== RM 3054 ==
Ranch to Market Road 3054
- Location: Henderson County
- Length: 4.168 mi (6.708 km)
- Existed: 1966–present

Ranch to Market Road 3054 (RM 3054) is located in Henderson county. It begins at SH 198 north of Malakoff and continues northeast to RM 2329.

== FM 3055 ==
Farm to Market Road 3055
- Location: Rusk County
- Length: 3.485 mi (5.609 km)
- Existed: 1966–present

Farm to Market Road 3055 (FM 3055) is located in Rusk county. It begins at US 84 in Mt. Enterprise and continues southwest 3.485 miles (5.609 km).

== FM 3056 ==
Farm to Market Road 3056
- Location: Wood County
- Length: 4.254 mi (6.846 km)
- Existed: 1966–present

Farm to Market Road 3056 (FM 3056) is located in Wood county. It begins at US 80 west of Crow and continues northeast 4.254 miles (6.846 km) to FM 778 southeast of Hainesville.

== FM 3057 ==
Farm to Market Road 3057
- Location: Matagorda County
- Length: 2.416 mi (3.888 km)
- Existed: 1966–present

Farm to Market Road 3057 (FM 3057) is located in Matagorda county. It begins at the Oxea Chemical Plant, southeast of Lake Le Tulle, and continues east 2.416 miles (3.888 km) to FM 2668.

== FM 3058 ==
Farm to Market Road 3058
- Location: Burleson County
- Length: 11.051 mi (17.785 km)
- Existed: 1966–present

Farm to Market Road 3058 (FM 3058) is located in Burleson county. It begins at FM 166 east of Caldwell and continues southeast 11.051 miles (17.785 km) to FM 60 northeast of Lyons.

== FM 3059 ==
Farm to Market Road 3059
- Location: Freestone County
- Length: 4.871 mi (7.839 km)
- Existed: 1966–present

Farm to Market Road 3059 (FM 3059) is located in Freestone county. It begins at SH 75 at Streetman and continues northeast and northwest 4.871 miles (7.839 km) to the Navarro County Line.

== FM 3060 ==
Farm to Market Road 3060
- Location: Madison County
- Length: 2.083 mi (3.352 km)
- Existed: 1966–present

Farm to Market Road 3060 (FM 3060) is located in Madison county. It begins at SH 21 at Midway and continues north 2.083 miles (3.352 km).

== FM 3061 ==
Farm to Market Road 3061
- Location: Milam County
- Length: 4.616 mi (7.429 km)
- Existed: 1966–present

Farm to Market Road 3061 (FM 3061) is located in Milam county. It begins at FM 487 at Lilac and continues south 4.616 miles (7.429 km) to FM 486 at San Gabriel.

== FM 3062 ==
Farm to Market Road 3062
- Location: Henderson County
- Length: 2.819 mi (4.537 km)
- Existed: August 1, 1967–present

Farm to Market Road 3062 (FM 3062) is located in Henderson county. It begins at Star Harbor and continues south and east 2.819 miles (4.537 km) to SH 198 in Malakoff.

=== FM 3062 (1966) ===
Farm to Market Road 3062
- Location: Washington County
- Existed: May 5, 1966–June 2, 1967

FM 3062 was first designated on May 5, 1966, running from FM 109 to FM 332. On June 2, 1967, the highway was cancelled and removed from the highway system. It was never built.

== FM 3063 ==
Farm to Market Road 3063
- Location: Hardin County
- Length: 2.056 mi (3.309 km)
- Existed: 1966–present

Farm to Market Road 3063 (FM 3063) is located in Hardin county. It begins at US 69 north of Village Mills and continues west 2.056 miles (3.309 km).

== FM 3064 ==
Farm to Market Road 3064
- Location: Brown County
- Length: 1.256 mi (2.021 km)
- Existed: November 26, 1969–present

Farm to Market Road 3064 (FM 3064) is located in Brown county. It begins at US 377 south of Brownwood and continues east to FM 2376.

=== FM 3064 (1966) ===
Farm to Market Road 3064
- Location: Liberty County
- Existed: May 5, 1966–July 11, 1968

FM 3064 was first designated on May 5, 1966, running from FM 834 north 3.0 miles (4.8 km) to a road intersection. On June 2, 1967, the highway was extended northward to FM 162. On July 11, 1968, FM 3064 was cancelled and removed from the highway system in exchange for extending FM 2090.

== FM 3065 ==
Farm to Market Road 3065
- Location: Tyler County
- Length: 6.903 mi (11.109 km)
- Existed: 1966–present

Farm to Market Road 3065 (FM 3065) is located in Tyler county. It begins at US 69 north of Doucette and continues northeast and northwest 6.903 miles (11.109 km) to FM 256 at Colmesneil.

== FM 3066 ==
Farm to Market Road 3066
- Location: Brooks County
- Length: 2.103 mi (3.384 km)
- Existed: 1966–present

Farm to Market Road 3066 (FM 3066) is located in Brooks county. It begins at US 281 south of SH 285 and continues west 2.103 miles (3.384 km).

== FM 3067 ==
Farm to Market Road 3067
- Location: Cameron County
- Length: 2.369 mi (3.813 km)
- Existed: 1966–present

Farm to Market Road 3067 (FM 3067) is located in Cameron county. It begins at FM 506 south of LaFeria and continues east 2.369 miles (3.813 km) to FM 800.

== FM 3068 ==
Farm to Market Road 3068
- Location: Cameron County
- Length: 1.501 mi (2.416 km)
- Existed: 1966–present

Farm to Market Road 3068 (FM 3068) is located in southern Cameron County. It begins at FM 1419, about 0.25 mi (0.40 km) north of the Rio Grande and near the aptly named colonia of Southmost. FM 3068 travels north along Indiana Avenue and enters Brownsville to its northern terminus at FM 511, which continues to the north along Indiana Avenue and to the west along Dockberry Road.

FM 3068 was designated on May 5, 1966, along the current route.

== FM 3069 ==
Farm to Market Road 3069
- Location: Cameron County
- Length: 3.026 mi (4.870 km)
- Existed: 1966–present

Farm to Market Road 3069 (FM 3069) is located in Cameron county. It begins at FM 2480 northeast of Los Fresnos and continues north 3.026 miles (4.870 km) to FM 510.

== FM 3070 ==
Farm to Market Road 3070
- Location: Collingsworth County
- Existed: August 1, 1966–May 30, 1974

Farm to Market Road 3070 (FM 3070) was designated on August 1, 1966, running from FM 1547 to a road intersection. On July 11, 1968, the highway was extended 5.6 miles (9.0 km) to the south and west. On November 26, 1969, the highway was extended 3.3 miles (5.3 km) to the north. On May 30, 1974, FM 3070 was cancelled and combined with FM 3143.

No highway currently uses the FM 3070 designation.

== FM 3071 ==
Farm to Market Road 3071
- Location: Hidalgo County
- Length: 1.454 mi (2.340 km)
- Existed: 1966–present

Farm to Market Road 3071 (FM 3071) is located in Hidalgo county. It begins at SH 107 east of FM 88 and continues north 1.454 miles (2.340 km) to FM 1925.

== FM 3072 ==
Farm to Market Road 3072
- Location: Hidalgo County
- Length: 5.122 mi (8.243 km)
- Existed: 1966–present

Farm to Market Road 3072 (FM 3072) is located in southern Hidalgo County.

FM 3072 begins at an intersection with FM 2061 in Pharr. The highway runs east along Dicker Drive through town, where it intersects US 281. FM 3072 continues to run east, exiting the town just after US 281 and enters into San Juan, where it intersects FM 2557. The highway ends at an intersection with FM 907 south of Alamo.

FM 3072 was designated on May 5, 1966, along its current route. On June 27, 1995, the entire route was redesignated Urban Road 3072 (UR 3072). The designation reverted to FM 3072 with the elimination of the Urban Road system on November 15, 2018.

Junction list

The entire route is in Hidalgo County.

Location	mi	km	Destinations	Notes
Pharr	0.0	0.0	FM 2061 (Jackson Road)	
Pharr	1.3	2.1	US 281 (Cage Boulevard) – Edinburg, Progreso	
San Juan	3.6	5.8	FM 2557 (Stewart Road) – San Juan	
	5.1	8.2	FM 907 (Alamo Road) – Alamo	
1.000 mi = 1.609 km; 1.000 km = 0.621 mi

== FM 3073 ==
Farm to Market Road 3073
- Location: Jim Hogg County
- Length: 16.256 mi (26.161 km)
- Existed: 1966–present

Farm to Market Road 3073 (FM 3073) is located in Jim Hogg county. It begins at FM 649 south of the Webb County Line and continues east 16.256 miles (26.161 km) to SH 16.

== FM 3074 ==
Farm to Market Road 3074
- Location: Zapata County
- Length: 1.652 mi (2.659 km)
- Existed: 1966–present

Farm to Market Road 3074 (FM 3074) is located in Zapata county. It begins at FM 496 southwest of Zapata and continues southeast 1.652 miles (2.659 km) to Falcon Lake.

== FM 3075 ==
Farm to Market Road 3075
- Location: Wheeler County
- Length: 3.037 mi (4.888 km)
- Existed: 1966–present

Farm to Market Road 3075 (FM 3075) is located in Wheeler county. It begins at Interstate 40 at Lela and continues north 3.037 miles (4.888 km).

== FM 3076 ==
Farm to Market Road 3076
- Location: Madison and Houston counties
- Length: 7.0 mi (11.3 km)
- Existed: 1966–present

Farm to Market Road 3076 (FM 3076) is located in Madison and Houston counties. It begins at FM 247 north of the Walker County Line and continues east and northeast 7.0 miles (11.3 km) to FM 230.

== FM 3077 ==
Farm to Market Road 3077
- Location: Clay County
- Length: 2.355 mi (3.790 km)
- Existed: 1966–present

Farm to Market Road 3077 (FM 3077) is located in Clay county. It begins at FM 174 at Buffalo Springs and continues south and east 2.355 miles (3.790 km).

== FM 3078 ==
Farm to Market Road 3078
- Location: Reeves and Jeff Davis counties
- Length: 14.678 mi (23.622 km)
- Existed: November 21, 1991–present

Farm to Market Road 3078 (FM 3078) is located in Reeves and Jeff Davis counties. A former alignment of US 290, it runs through rural lands between I-10 and SH 17.

=== RM 3078/FM 3078 (1966–1983) ===
Ranch to Market Road 3078
- Location: Maverick and Zavala counties
- Existed: June 21, 1966–July 8, 1983

A previous route designated Ranch to Market Road 3078 (RM 3078) was designated on June 21, 1966, from SH 76 (now US 57) to a point 7.0 miles (11.3 km) northeast. On April 25, 1978, the road was extended northeast 4.0 miles (6.4 km) and renamed FM 3078. On January 23, 1980, the road was extended northeast 17.7 miles (28.5 km) to FM 481 at the Zavala–Uvalde county line. FM 3078 was cancelled on July 8, 1983, and transferred to FM 481.

== FM 3079 ==
Farm to Market Road 3079
- Location: Henderson County
- Length: 5.209 mi (8.383 km)
- Existed: 1967–present

Farm to Market Road 3079 (FM 3079) is located in Henderson county. It begins at FM 314 near New Hope and continues east 5.209 miles (8.383 km) to FM 315.

== FM 3080 ==
Farm to Market Road 3080
- Location: Van Zandt County
- Length: 6.676 mi (10.744 km)
- Existed: 1967–present

Farm to Market Road 3080 (FM 3080) is located in Van Zandt county. It begins at SH 198 at Kaufman County Line and continues south and east 6.676 miles (10.744 km) to FM 316.

It was designated on June 2, 1967 as Ranch to Market Road 3080 (RM 3080), running along its current route. The designation was changed to FM 3080 on May 5, 1992.

== FM 3081 ==
Farm to Market Road 3081
- Location: San Jacinto County
- Length: 7.255 mi (11.676 km)
- Existed: 1967–present

Farm to Market Road 3081 (FM 3081) is located in San Jacinto county. It begins at FM 1725 southeast of SH 150 and continues south and west 7,255 miles (11.676 km) to the Montgomery County Line.

== FM 3082 ==
Farm to Market Road 3082
- Location: Shelby County
- Length: 2.346 mi (3.776 km)
- Existed: 1967–present

Farm to Market Road 3082 (FM 3082) is located in Shelby county. It begins at SH 7 southwest of Joaquin and continues southeast 2.346 miles (3.776 km).

== FM 3083 ==
Farm to Market Road 3083
- Location: Montgomery County
- Length: 16.653 mi (26.800 km)
- Existed: 1967–present

Farm to Market Road 3083 (FM 3083) is located in Montgomery County.

FM 3083 begins at an intersection with Farm to Market Road 1485/Old Houston Road southeast of Grangerland. The highway passes through Grangerland where it intersects with Farm to Market Road 2090. FM 3083 enters the city limits of Conroe right before intersecting with Loop 336. Inside the loop, the highway runs through largely undeveloped areas of the town's eastern side. North of Loop 336, FM 3083 turns to the west and starts to see a little more development along its route until an intersection with Farm to Market Road 1484. FM 3083 passes near a major retail area between SH 75 and Interstate 45. The highway passes over the interstate on the Don Blanton Memorial Bridge and runs near many residential areas before ending at SH 105 in northwestern Conroe.

FM 3083 was designated on June 2, 1967, from SH 105 east of Conroe southeast to FM 1485. On February 26, 1986, FM 3083 was extended west to I-45. On February 26, 1998, FM 3083 was extended northwest to SH 105.

Junction list

The entire route is in Montgomery County.

Location	mi	km	Destinations	Notes
	0.0	0.0	FM 1485 / Old Houston Road	
Grangerland	2.1	3.4	FM 2090 east	
Conroe	7.7	12.4	Loop 336	
Conroe	9.2	14.8	SH 105 (E. Davis Street)	
Conroe	10.7	17.2	Loop 336	
Conroe	11.9	19.2	FM 1484	
Conroe	13.6	21.9	SH 75 (N. Frazier Street)	Former US 75
Conroe	14.4	23.2	I-45	I-45 exit 89
Conroe	16.7	26.9	SH 105 (W. Davis Street)	
1.000 mi = 1.609 km; 1.000 km = 0.621 mi

== FM 3084 ==
Farm to Market Road 3084
- Location: Calhoun County
- Length: 4.499 mi (7.240 km)
- Existed: 1967–present

Farm to Market Road 3084 (FM 3084) is located in Calhoun county. It begins at SH 35 northeast of US 87 and continues northwest and northeast approximately 4.499 miles (7.240 km) to FM 1090.

== FM 3085 ==
Farm to Market Road 3085
- Location: Victoria County
- Length: 2.333 mi (3.755 km)
- Existed: 1967–present

Farm to Market Road 3085 (FM 3085) is located in Victoria county. It begins at FM 1686 northeast of Da Costa and continues southeast 2.333 miles (3.755 km).

== FM 3086 ==
Farm to Market Road 3086
- Location: Matagorda and Wharton counties
- Length: 7.158 mi (11.520 km)
- Existed: 1967–present

Farm to Market Road 3086 (FM 3086) is located in Matagorda and Wharton counties. It begins at FM 441 west of SH 71 and continues southward 7.158 miles (11.520 km) to SH 111.

== FM 3087 ==
Farm to Market Road 3087
- Location: Jim Wells County
- Length: 2.502 mi (4.027 km)
- Existed: 1967–present

Farm to Market Road 3087 (FM 3087) is located in Jim Wells county. It begins at FM 625, 0.2 mile (0.322 km) south of SH 359 and continues westward 2.502 miles (4.027 km).

== FM 3088 ==
Farm to Market Road 3088
- Location: Nueces County
- Length: 5.328 mi (8.575 km)
- Existed: 1967–present

Farm to Market Road 3088 (FM 3088) is located in Nueces county. It begins at FM 666, 0.7 mile (1.127 km) north of Bluntzer and continues northwest 5.328 miles (8.575 km) to FM 70.

== FM 3089 ==
Farm to Market Road 3089
- Location: San Patricio County
- Length: 7.117 mi (11.454 km)
- Existed: 1967–present

Farm to Market Road 3089 (FM 3089) is located in San Patricio county. It begins at US 181 in St. Paul and continues westward 7.117 miles (11.454 km) to FM 796.

== FM 3090 ==
Farm to Market Road 3090
- Location: Grimes County
- Length: 17.560 mi (28.260 km)
- Existed: June 2, 1967–present

Farm to Market Road 3090 (FM 3090) is located in Grimes County. It runs from FM 244 south of Carlos to Bus. SH 6 in Navasota.

FM 3090 was designated on June 2, 1967, from FM 244, 2.5 miles (4.0 km) southeast of Carlos, southeast 5.2 miles (8.4 km) to SH 90 near Anderson. On October 8, 1970, the route was transferred to FM 244 while FM 3090 was rerouted along the former route of FM 244 to SH 6 (later Loop 508, now Bus. SH 6) in Navasota.

== FM 3091 ==
Farm to Market Road 3091
- Location: Madison County
- Length: 4.218 mi (6.788 km)
- Existed: 1967–present

Farm to Market Road 3091 (FM 3091) is located in Madison county. It begins at Interstate 45, 1.0 mile (1.61 km) southeast of US 75 and continues northeast 4.218 miles (6.788 km).

== FM 3092 ==
Farm to Market Road 3092
- Location: Cooke County
- Length: 3.633 mi (5.847 km)
- Existed: May 7, 1970–present

Farm to Market Road 3092 (FM 3092) is located in Cooke county. It begins at US 82 east of Gainesville and continues southward 3.633 miles (5.847 km) to FM 902.

=== FM 3092 (1967) ===
Farm to Market Road 3092
- Location: Washington County
- Existed: June 2, 1967–December 19, 1969

FM 3092 was first designated on June 2, 1967, running from SH 36 southwest 4.8 miles (7.7 km) to a road intersection. On December 19, 1969, the highway was cancelled and combined with FM 1948.

== RM 3093 ==
Ranch to Market Road 3093
- Location: Glasscock and Reagan counties
- Length: 8.92 mi (14.36 km)
- Existed: 1975–present

Ranch to Market Road 3093 (RM 3093) is located in Glasscock and Reagan counties. It connects SH 137 and RM 33.

RM 3093 begins at an intersection with RM 1357 in unincorporated Glasscock County. The highway runs in a slight northwest direction, turning west at a county road, before turning back in a northwest direction. RM 3093's northern terminus is at an intersection with RM 2401 in unincorporated Reagan County.

RM 3093 was designated on November 25, 1975, on its current route.

=== FM 3093 ===
Farm to Market Road 3093
- Location: Collin County
- Existed: June 2, 1967–May 7, 1974

A previous route designated Farm to Market Road 3093 (FM 3093) was designated in Collin County on June 2, 1967. It ran from FM 2862 in Westminster northward and westward approximately 3.1 miles (5.0 km) to Sedalia. FM 3093 was cancelled on May 7, 1974, and was combined with FM 3133.

== FM 3094 ==
Farm to Market Road 3094
- Location: Kaufman County
- Length: 4.81 mi (7.74 km)
- Existed: 1967–present

Farm to Market Road 3094 (FM 3094) is located in Kaufman county. It begins at FM 148 west via Peeltown and continues northward and eastward to FM 148 4.81 miles (7.74 km).

== FM 3095 ==
Farm to Market Road 3095
- Location: Upton and Midland counties
- Length: 8.947 mi (14.399 km)
- Existed: November 25, 1975–present

Farm to Market Road 3095 (FM 3095) is located in Upton and Midland counties. It begins at FM 1379, 7.5 miles (12.07 km) southwest of RM 1357 and continues southeast and northeast 8.947 miles (14.399 km) to RM 2401 at Midkiff.

=== FM 3095 (1967) ===
Farm to Market Road 3095
- Location: Kaufman County
- Existed: June 2, 1967–June 7, 1974

FM 3095 was first designated on June 2, 1967, running from FM 1388 southwest 1.9 miles (3.1 km) to the Wilson Chapel Church and Cemetery. On June 7, 1974, the highway was cancelled and combined with FM 2860.

== FM 3096 ==
Farm to Market Road 3096
- Location: Navarro County
- Length: 7.835 mi (12.609 km)
- Existed: 1967–present

Farm to Market Road 3096 (FM 3096) is located in Navarro County. It begins at SH 309 in Kerens and continues southeast and northeast approximately 7.835 miles (12,609 km) via Goodnight to SH 309.

== FM 3097 ==
Farm to Market Road 3097
- Location: Rockwall County
- Length: 2.57 mi (4.14 km)
- Existed: 1967–present

Farm to Market Road 3097 (FM 3097) is located in entirely in Rockwall. The highway was designated on June 2, 1967, along the current route. FM 3097 is known locally as Horizon Road.

FM 3097 begins at an intersection with FM 549. The highway runs northwest, passing by many housing developments until an intersection with Ralph Hall Parkway. After Ralph Hall Parkway, the highway passes by a major retail center before ending at an intersection with FM 740.

== FM 3098 ==
Farm to Market Road 3098
- Location: Bowie County
- Length: 6.817 mi (10.971 km)
- Existed: 1967–present

Farm to Market Road 3098 (FM 3098) is located in Bowie County. It begins at US 67 at Redwater and continues northwest 6.817 miles (10.971 km) to FM 2149.

== FM 3099 ==
Farm to Market Road 3099
- Location: Stephens County
- Length: 5.863 mi (9.436 km)
- Existed: November 25, 1975–present

Farm to Market Road 3099 (FM 3099) is located in Stephens County.

The highway begins at an intersection with FM 2231 in unincorporated Stephens County. FM 3099 runs north before entering Breckenridge, where the highway has a short overlap with US 180. Leaving its concurrency with US 180, FM 3099 continues to run north, passing near Hubbard Creek Reservoir before ending at Hubbard Creek Dam Road near the Hubbard Creek Reservoir Dam. FM 3099 in Breckenridge south of US 180 is known locally as City Pool Road.

FM 3099 was designated on November 25, 1975, from Hubbard Creek Dam Road south to US 180. On October 29, 1992, FM 3099 was extended south to FM 2231.

Junction list

The entire route is in Stephens County.

Location	mi	km	Destinations	Notes
	0.0	0.0	FM 2231	
Breckenridge	2.1	3.4	US 180 east (Walker Street) – Palo Pinto	South end of US 180 overlap
Breckenridge	2.1	3.4	US 180 west – Albany	North end of US 180 overlap
	5.8	9.3	Hubbard Creek Dam Road	
1.000 mi = 1.609 km; 1.000 km = 0.621 mi: Concurrency terminus

=== FM 3099 (1967) ===
Farm to Market Road 3099
- Location: Hardin County
- Existed: June 2, 1967–August 18, 1975

FM 3099 was first designated on June 2, 1967. This highway ran from FM 92 1.4 miles (2.3 km) north of FM 1122 to FM 418 in Hardin County. This highway was decommissioned on August 18, 1975, being removed from the highway system.
