= Jamaica Beach, Texas =

City of Jamaica Beach
- City
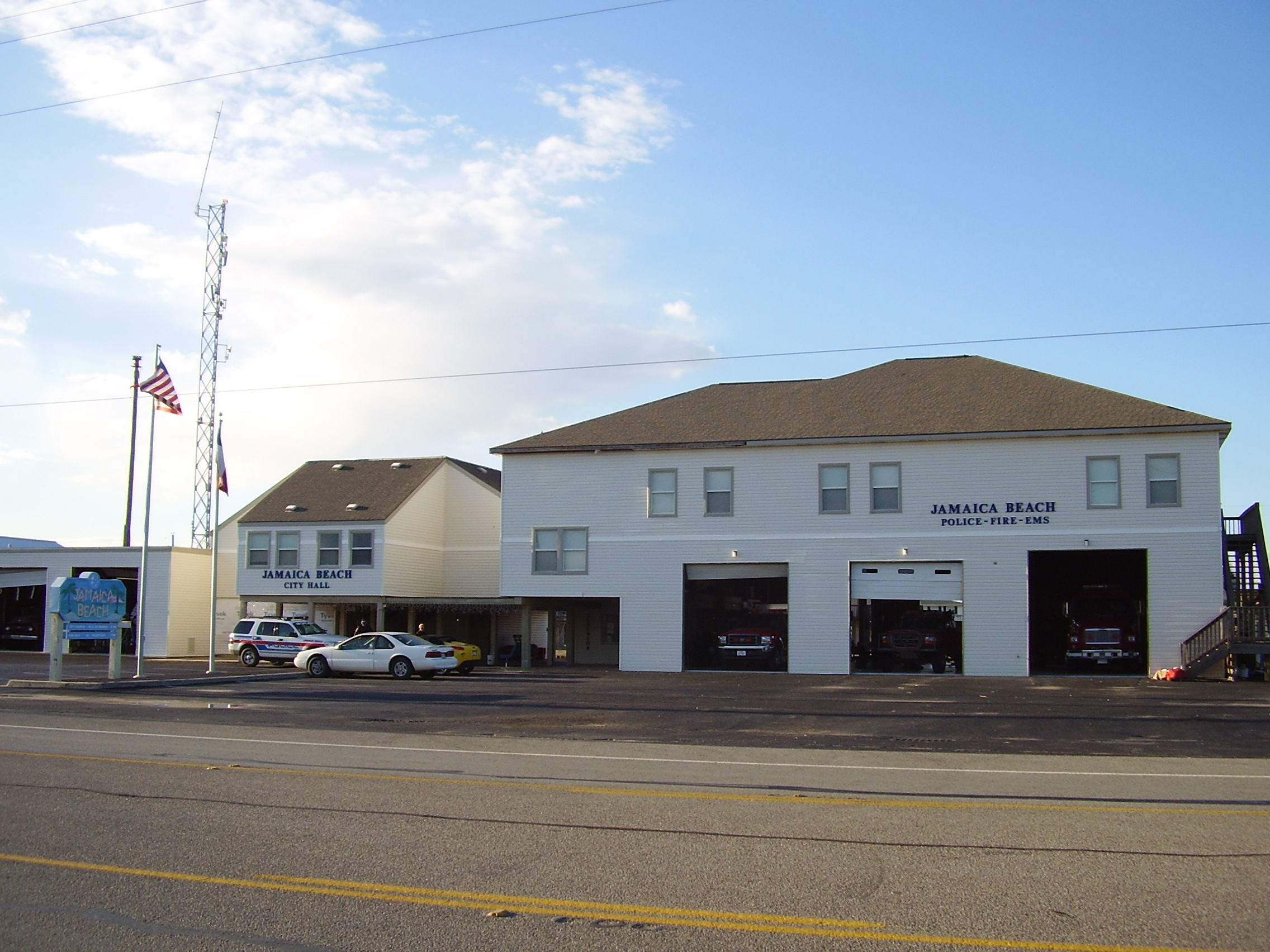
- Jamaica Beach City Hall

- Seal
- Motto(s): "A Great Place to Visit, but an even Better Place to Live"
- Location of Jamaica Beach, Texas
- Coordinates: 29°11′31″N 94°58′50″W
- Country: United States
- State: Texas
- County: Galveston
- Established: May 12, 1975

Government
  - Type: General law
  - Mayor: Mary Morse

Area
  - Total: 0.72 sq mi (1.86 km^{2})
  - Land: 0.58 sq mi (1.50 km^{2})
  - Water: 0.14 sq mi (0.35 km^{2})
- Elevation: 3.3 ft (1 m)

Population (2020)
  - Total: 1,078
  - Density: 1,860/sq mi (719/km^{2})
- Time zone: UTC-6 (Central (CST))
  - Summer (DST): UTC-5 (CDT)
- ZIP codes: 77550, 77554
- Area code: 409
- FIPS code: 48-37252
- GNIS feature ID: 1388565
- Website: www.jamaicabeachtx.gov

Jamaica Beach is a city in Galveston County, Texas, United States on Galveston Island. As of the 2020 census, the city's population was 1,078. The city is bordered by Galveston to the east and west, the west bay on the north, and the Gulf of Mexico to the south.

== History ==
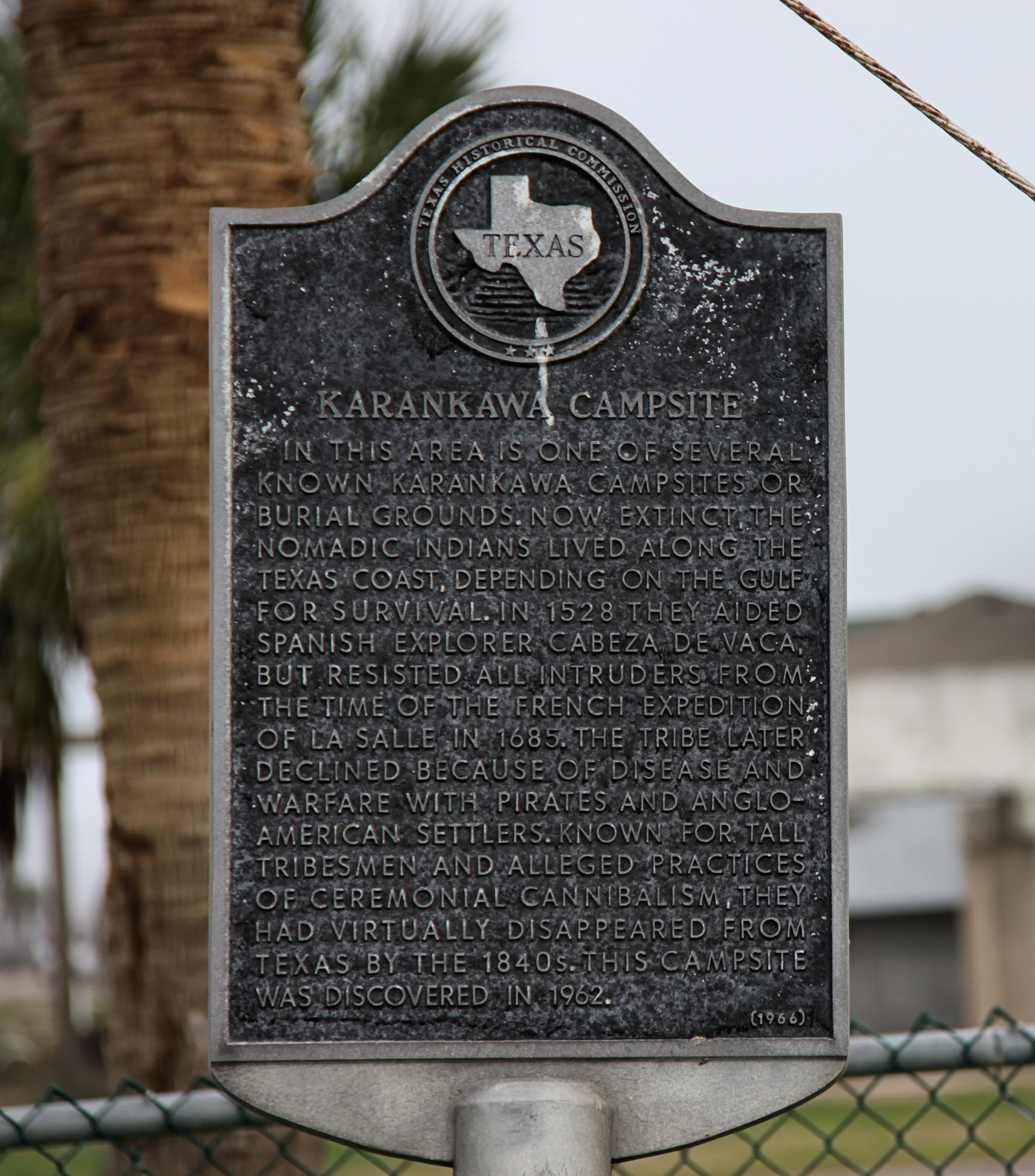
Karankawa Indian Historical Marker in Jamaica Beach

Before its development, Jamaica Beach was a burial ground of the Karankawa people. Johnny Goyen and Earl Galceran of the Jamaica Corporation developed Jamaica Beach as a 2,000-lot resort subdivision close to a marina. The individuals who were a part of the development effort were Goyen, Galceran, brothers Jack and Welcome Wilson, Bill Sherrill, and Jack Valenti. They acquired an area of 320 acres (130 ha) that was owned by the Moody family. An oil businessperson named R.E. "Bob" Smith decided not to be a partner in the development, but he purchased the Moody land and sold it to the developers. He did not ask for any down payments and he guaranteed a $250,000 bank loan. Initially, the beachfront lots, each 90 feet (27 m), were sold for $3,500 apiece. The "second-row" houses sold at a quick pace. As the subsequent rows of houses opened for sale, the sales figures decreased slowly because while wealthy people were easily able to acquire second houses, middle-class homebuyers were unable to get a mortgage, and needed to pay for the homebuilding with cash.

In the 1960s, the discovery of a skull and that it was connected to a Karankawa Native American burial ground led to an increase in public exposure and visitors. Welcome Wilson said that no additional sales were generated by the publicity. With the growth of the second house market, almost all of the lots on Jamaica Beach had been sold by the 1970s. Due to a decline in the United States economy, the developer closed its doors. The city incorporated on May 12, 1975. By 1978, 141 residents lived in Jamaica Beach. By 1988, the city had 446 residents and no businesses. By 1990, the city had 624 residents.

Jamaica Beach was affected by Hurricane Alicia in August 1983. In September 2008, the city was affected by Hurricane Ike.

On Saturday August 9, 2008, Jamaica Beach celebrated the 50th anniversary of its groundbreaking. At the ceremony, Welcome Wilson donated boxes of news articles, brochures, and promotional materials in order to build a collection for a museum located at the city hall. In addition, the five children of Welcome Wilson donated $10,000 to the new museum.

== Geography ==
Jamaica Beach is located at 29°11′31″N 94°58′50″W (29.192080, –94.980488).

According to the United States Census Bureau, the city has a total area of 0.77 square miles (2.0 km^{2}), of which 0.19 square miles (0.5 km^{2}), or 24.57%, is covered by water.

The city has several pirate-themed street names. They include "Blackbeard", "Buccaneer", "Captain Hook", "Captain Kidd". "Francis Drake", "John Davis", "Jean Lafitte", "Mansvelt", "Henry Morgan", "John Silver", and "Edward Teach".

== Parks ==
- Galveston Island State Park

== Demographics ==
Historical population
Census	Pop.	Note	%±
1980	365		—
1990	624		71.0%
2000	1,075		72.3%
2010	983		−8.6%
2020	1,078		9.7%
U.S. Decennial Census

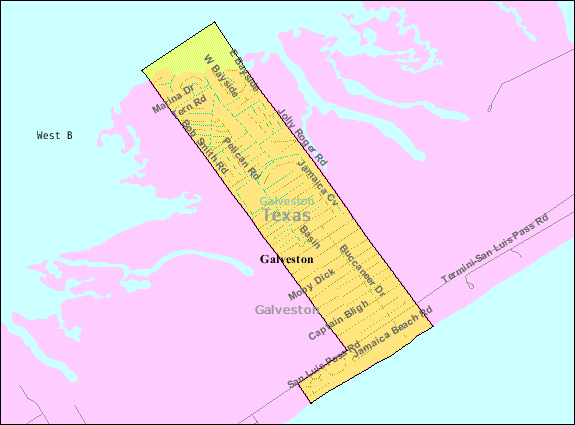
Map of Jamaica Beach

=== 2020 census ===
As of the 2020 census, Jamaica Beach had a population of 1,078, a median age of 59.1 years, 7.9% of residents under the age of 18, 31.6% of residents 65 years of age or older, 104.6 males per 100 females, and 103.1 males per 100 females age 18 and over.

100.0% of residents lived in urban areas, while 0.0% lived in rural areas.

There were 552 households in Jamaica Beach, of which 14.5% had children under the age of 18 living in them. Of all households, 53.6% were married-couple households, 21.4% were households with a male householder and no spouse or partner present, and 18.7% were households with a female householder and no spouse or partner present. About 31.2% of all households were made up of individuals and 15.6% had someone living alone who was 65 years of age or older.

There were 1,410 housing units, of which 60.9% were vacant. The homeowner vacancy rate was 1.6% and the rental vacancy rate was 17.3%.

Racial composition as of the 2020 census
Race	Number	Percent
White	962	89.2%
Black or African American	6	0.6%
American Indian and Alaska Native	7	0.6%
Asian	15	1.4%
Native Hawaiian and Other Pacific Islander	0	0.0%
Some other race	15	1.4%
Two or more races	73	6.8%
Hispanic or Latino (of any race)	83	7.7%

=== 2000 census ===
As of the 2000 census, there were 1,075 people, 483 households, and 303 families residing in the city. The population density was 1,487.7 inhabitants per square mile (574.4/km^{2}). There were 1,078 housing units at an average density of 1,491.8 per square mile (576.0/km^{2}). The racial makeup of the city was 95.07% White, 0.37% African American, 0.37% Native American, 0.56% Asian, 1.95% from other races, and 1.67% from two or more races. Hispanic or Latino of any race were 8.56% of the population.

There were 483 households, out of which 25.7% had children under the age of 18 living with them, 52.8% were married couples living together, 6.8% had a female householder with no husband present, and 37.1% were non-families. 27.3% of all households were made up of individuals, and 7.7% had someone living alone who was 65 years of age or older. The average household size was 2.23 and the average family size was 2.74.

In the city, the population was 20.3% under the age of 18, 4.9% from 18 to 24, 31.9% from 25 to 44, 28.4% from 45 to 64, and 14.5% who were 65 years of age or older. The median age was 42 years. For every 100 females, there were 99.8 males. For every 100 females age 18 and over, there were 99.8 males. The median income for a household in the city was $52,045, and the median income for a family was $66,250. Males had a median income of $42,411 versus $31,875 for females. The per capita income for the city was $30,943. About 5.7% of families and 7.3% of the population were below the poverty line, including 8.4% of those under age 18 and none of those age 65 or over.

== Government and infrastructure ==
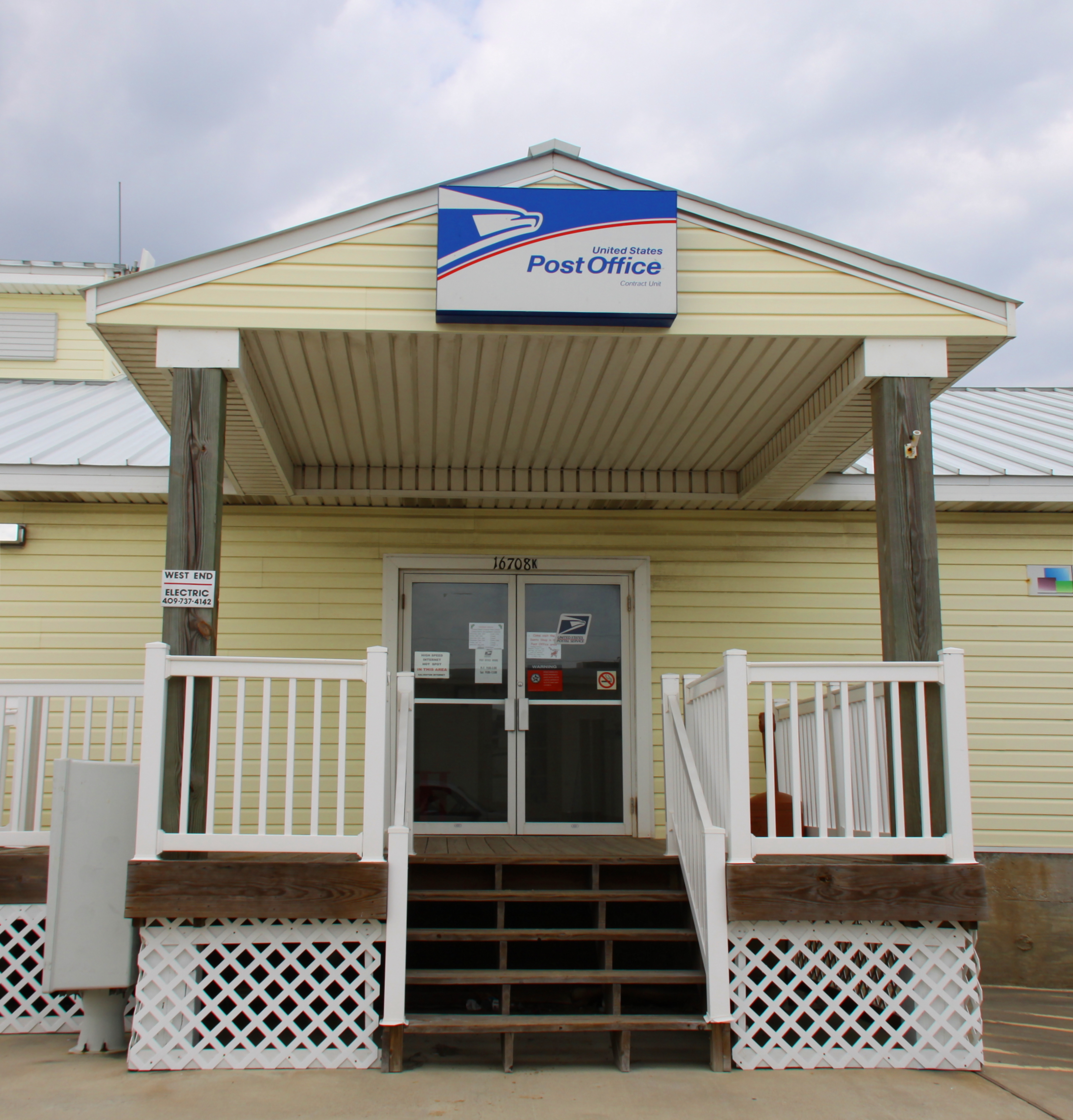
West Galveston Island Contract Post Office in Jamaica Beach

As of 2008 the City Council includes Mayor Victor Pierson, Mayor Pro Tem Steve Spicer, and four aldermen (Brad South, Eddie Burke, Sherwood Green, and Mary Morse). The city council established the Jamaica Beach Police Department in 1978; as of 2008 the department has one chief, one lieutenant, and five police officers. Jamaica Beach contracted its dispatching to the City of Hitchcock. After a large brush fire, the city created the Jamaica Beach Volunteer Fire Department and EMS in 1976. The city also has a municipal court, a water and sewer department, and a building department.

In November 2007 a United States Postal Service Contract Postal Unit opened inside a local business in Jamaica Beach. The West Galveston Contract Unit (77554-9998) is at Bob Smith Drive near Farm to Market Road 3005.

Galveston County Health District Galveston Area Ambulance Authority (GAAA) operates emergency medical services covering Jamaica Beach.

The City of Jamaica Beach relays animal control requests to the City of Galveston. The City of Galveston contracts animal shelter services to the Galveston Island Humane Society.

== Education ==
Pupils in Jamaica Beach are within the Galveston Independent School District. As of 2020 there are no particular attendance boundaries in GISD so parents may apply to any school they wish. Ball High School (9–12) in Galveston is the district's sole comprehensive high school.

Previously students are zoned to Oppe Elementary School (K–4) and Weis Middle School (6–8).

Galveston ISD (and therefore Jamaica Beach) is assigned to Galveston College in Galveston.

Texas A&M University at Galveston is in nearby Galveston.
