= Sabine High School =

Location
- 5424 FM 1252 W Gladewater, Texas 75647-9711; United States; 32.44619°N 94.95197°W

Information
- School type: Public high school
- Motto: Where every student is important
- School district: Sabine Independent School District
- Principal: S Reeves
- Grades: 9-12
- Enrollment: 454 (2023-2024)
- Colors: Red & Blue
- Athletics conference: UIL Class 3A
- Mascot: Cardinal
- Website: Sabine High School

Sabine High School is a public high school located in the unincorporated community of Liberty City, Texas, in Gregg County, United States and classified as a 3A school by the UIL. It is a part of the Sabine Independent School District located in western Gregg County and is addressed to neighboring Gladewater. In 2013, the school was rated "Met Standard" by the Texas Education Agency.

== Athletics ==
The Sabine Cardinals compete in these sports

Volleyball, Cross Country, Football, Basketball, Powerlifting, Golf, Tennis, Track, Baseball & Softball

In 2014, the football team made the playoffs for the 1st time since 1985.

=== State Titles ===
- Boys Basketball
  - 1980(1A), 1981(1A)
- Boys Golf
  - 1961(B), 1962(B), 1963(B)
