= Sabine Independent School District =

School district in Texas, United States

Sabine Independent School District is a public school district based in the community of Liberty City, Texas (USA). The district also serves a small portion of the nearby town of Kilgore.

In 2009, the school district was rated "academically acceptable" by the Texas Education Agency.

== Overview ==
Located in western Gregg County, Sabine ISD has three schools -

- Sabine High School (Grades 9–12)
- Sabine Middle School (Grades 6–8)
- Sabine Elementary School (Grades PK-5)

For much of the 1980s and 90's Sabine ISD was split into four campuses, Elementary, Intermediate, Junior High and High School. It is not clear why the split, nor why the district reverted to three campuses during the late 1990s. The current high school was dedicated in 1984. The current junior high, previously the high school, was dedicated in 1969. The junior high campus was constructed after a fire destroyed the former high school. The elementary campus was built originally in the early 20th century with its primary school wing completed in 1980 and the former intermediate school campus completed in 1969 on the site of the former high school which had burned the same year. In December 2014, with a bond passed a year earlier, Sabine Elementary was dedicated at its new location, 645 Access Road Kilgore. It is the only campus within Sabine ISD that is located in Kilgore.

Sabine's mascot is the Cardinal. The school's colors are royal blue and cardinal red. Historically the school has emphasized the blue in its uniforms. The band traditionally has worn red jackets over blue trouser's with white highlights on the jacket. The school's athletic program is best known for the success of its boys' and girls' basketball programs. The school won two boys' titles in the 1979–80 and 1980–81 seasons. The boys' team completed a perfect 34–0 season en route to their second title in 1981. A sign at the towns main intersection of Highway 3053 (Old Highway 135) and FM 1252 commemorates the program's two titles. The team made the 2009 and 2010 playoffs but were eliminated both times in the regional tournament. The girls team advanced as far as the Area Finals in 2009.

Sabine gained statewide fame through its basketball program under the leadership of legendary Coach Carl Allen who guided the boys program for many years. Coach Allen retired in the late 1990s with over 700 career wins and two state titles. Allen died in October 2011. Allen, a graduate of East Texas Baptist University in nearby Marshall, TX, remains one of the winningest basketball coaches in Texas high school history.

The school district was founded in 1893. In 1965 the district voted to integrate and integration was completed in 1969. The former all black school known as North Chapel was closed after integration was completed. This was completed during the period of the school's greatest athletic success on the gridiron. Since the early 1980s the school's football program has seen little success. The Cardinals last made the playoffs in 1985 under coach Barry Morgan when the team finished the regular season 8–2. The team had no wins in the 2008 and 2011 seasons. The school is served by the Gladewater Post Office and therefore the school is often formally referred to as Gladewater-Sabine. However, this should not be confused with the Gladewater ISD which is located nearby across the mighty Sabine River. Sabine is an independent school district and has been since 1951. The name Sabine was chosen based on a former name for the community in which it is located. Other early names for the community were Goforth and Hogeye, and Reject. Sabine was eventually chosen as the name for the community's first post office.
