= Galveston Island Humane Society =

Non-profit organization

Galveston Island Humane Society is a non-profit organization headquartered in Galveston, Texas. The city government of Galveston contracts animal shelter services to the organization. The City of Jamaica Beach, the other municipality on the island, relays animal control requests to the City of Galveston.

== History ==
Circa 1999 the organization began fundraising to have a new animal shelter built. In 2009, construction on the facility was underway.

On June 1, 2025, Kristen Thompson became the organization's executive director.

That year, it deployed a mobile adoption facility and lengthened operating hours on weekends to increase animal adoptions.

In 2026 it received a $20,000 50th Anniversary Community Choice Grant from the Rotary Club of Galveston Island as a way of trying to prevent the surrendering of animals from individuals or families finding financial hardship.
