= Red Level, Texas =

Unincorporated community in Rusk County, Texas, United States

- Unincorporated community
- Location within Texas Location within the United States
- Coordinates: 32°20′25″N 94°58′05″W
- Country: United States
- State: Texas
- County: Rusk
- Elevation: 459 ft (140 m)
- Time zone: UTC-6 (Central (CST))
  - Summer (DST): UTC-5 (CDT)
- ZIP Code: 75662
- Area codes: 430 & 903
- GNIS feature ID: 1378942

Red Level is an unincorporated community in Rusk County, Texas, United States. It is located east of Farm to Market Road 3053, roughly 4.5 miles (7.2 km) north of Overton.

== See also ==
- List of unincorporated communities in Texas
