= Liberty City, Texas =

Neighborhood of Kilgore, United States

- Census-designated place
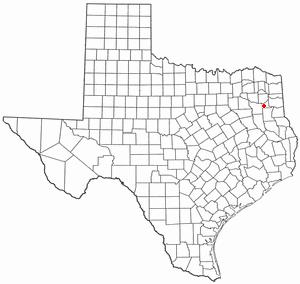
- Location of Liberty City, Texas

- Coordinates: 32°27′01″N 94°56′38″W
- Country: United States
- State: Texas
- County: Gregg

Area
  - Total: 6.10 sq mi (15.80 km^{2})
  - Land: 6.09 sq mi (15.78 km^{2})
  - Water: 0.0077 sq mi (0.02 km^{2})
- Elevation: 390 ft (120 m)

Population (2020)
  - Total: 2,721
  - Density: 390/sq mi (149/km^{2})
- Time zone: UTC-6 (Central (CST))
  - Summer (DST): UTC-5 (CDT)
- ZIP code: 75662 or 75647
- Area codes: 903, 430
- FIPS code: 48-42616
- GNIS feature ID: 2408607

Liberty City is a census-designated place (CDP) in Gregg County, Texas, United States. The population was 2,721 at the 2020 census, an increase over the figure of 2,351 tabulated in 2010.

== Geography ==
Liberty City is located in western Gregg County. Interstate 20 forms the southern edge of the CDP, with access from Exits 582 and 583. Texas State Highway 135 runs through the eastern side of Liberty City, leading north 8 miles (13 km) to Gladewater and southeast 6 miles (10 km) to Kilgore. Liberty City is 15 miles (24 km) southwest of the center of Longview and 24 miles (39 km) northeast of Tyler.

According to the United States Census Bureau, the CDP has a total area of 6.1 square miles (15.8 km^{2}), of which 0.01 square miles (0.02 km^{2}), or 0.13%, are water.

== Demographics ==
Historical population
Census	Pop.	Note	%±
1990	1,607		—
2000	1,935		20.4%
2010	2,351		21.5%
2020	2,721		15.7%
U.S. Decennial Census; 1850–1900 1910; 1920 1930 1940; 1950 1960 1970; 1980 1990 2000; 2010

Liberty City first appeared as a census designated place in the 1990 U.S. census.

=== 2020 census ===
Liberty City CDP, Texas – Racial and ethnic composition Note: the US Census treats Hispanic/Latino as an ethnic category. This table excludes Latinos from the racial categories and assigns them to a separate category. Hispanics/Latinos may be of any race.
Race / Ethnicity (NH = Non-Hispanic)	Pop 2000	Pop 2010	Pop 2020	% 2000	% 2010	% 2020
White alone (NH)	1,781	1,976	2,199	92.04%	84.05%	80.82%
Black or African American alone (NH)	83	81	114	4.29%	3.45%	4.19%
Native American or Alaska Native alone (NH)	6	14	8	0.31%	0.60%	0.29%
Asian alone (NH)	3	3	9	0.16%	0.13%	0.33%
Native Hawaiian or Pacific Islander alone (NH)	0	0	2	0.00%	0.00%	0.07%
Other race alone (NH)	0	2	12	0.00%	0.09%	0.44%
Mixed race or Multiracial (NH)	10	13	107	0.52%	0.55%	3.93%
Hispanic or Latino (any race)	52	262	270	2.69%	11.14%	9.92%
Total	1,935	2,351	2,721	100.00%	100.00%	100.00%

As of the 2020 United States census, there were 2,721 people, 754 households, and 689 families residing in the CDP.

As of the census of 2000, there were 1,935 people, 690 households, and 569 families residing in the CDP. The population density was 493.0 inhabitants per square mile (190.3/km^{2}). There were 747 housing units at an average density of 190.3 per square mile (73.5/km^{2}). The racial makeup of the CDP was 93.02% White, 4.50% African American, 0.36% Native American, 0.16% Asian, 1.03% from other races, and 0.93% from two or more races. Hispanic or Latino of any race were 2.69% of the population.

There were 690 households, out of which 41.3% had children under the age of 18 living with them, 67.8% were married couples living together, 10.4% had a female householder with no husband present, and 17.5% were non-families. 14.5% of all households were made up of individuals, and 7.0% had someone living alone who was 65 years of age or older. The average household size was 2.80 and the average family size was 3.09.

In the CDP, the population was spread out, with 28.5% under the age of 18, 8.2% from 18 to 24, 27.8% from 25 to 44, 24.4% from 45 to 64, and 11.2% who were 65 years of age or older. The median age was 36 years. For every 100 females, there were 92.7 males. For every 100 females age 18 and over, there were 92.2 males.

The median income for a household in the CDP was $55,000, and the median income for a family was $55,913. Males had a median income of $36,250 versus $22,880 for females. The per capita income for the CDP was $20,443. About 1.5% of families and 1.9% of the population were below the poverty line, including 1.7% of those under age 18 and none of those age 65 or over.

== Education ==
Liberty City is served by the Sabine Independent School District. The district's mascot is the Cardinal.
