= Galveston Island State Park =

State park in Texas, United States

- IUCN category IV (habitat/species management area)
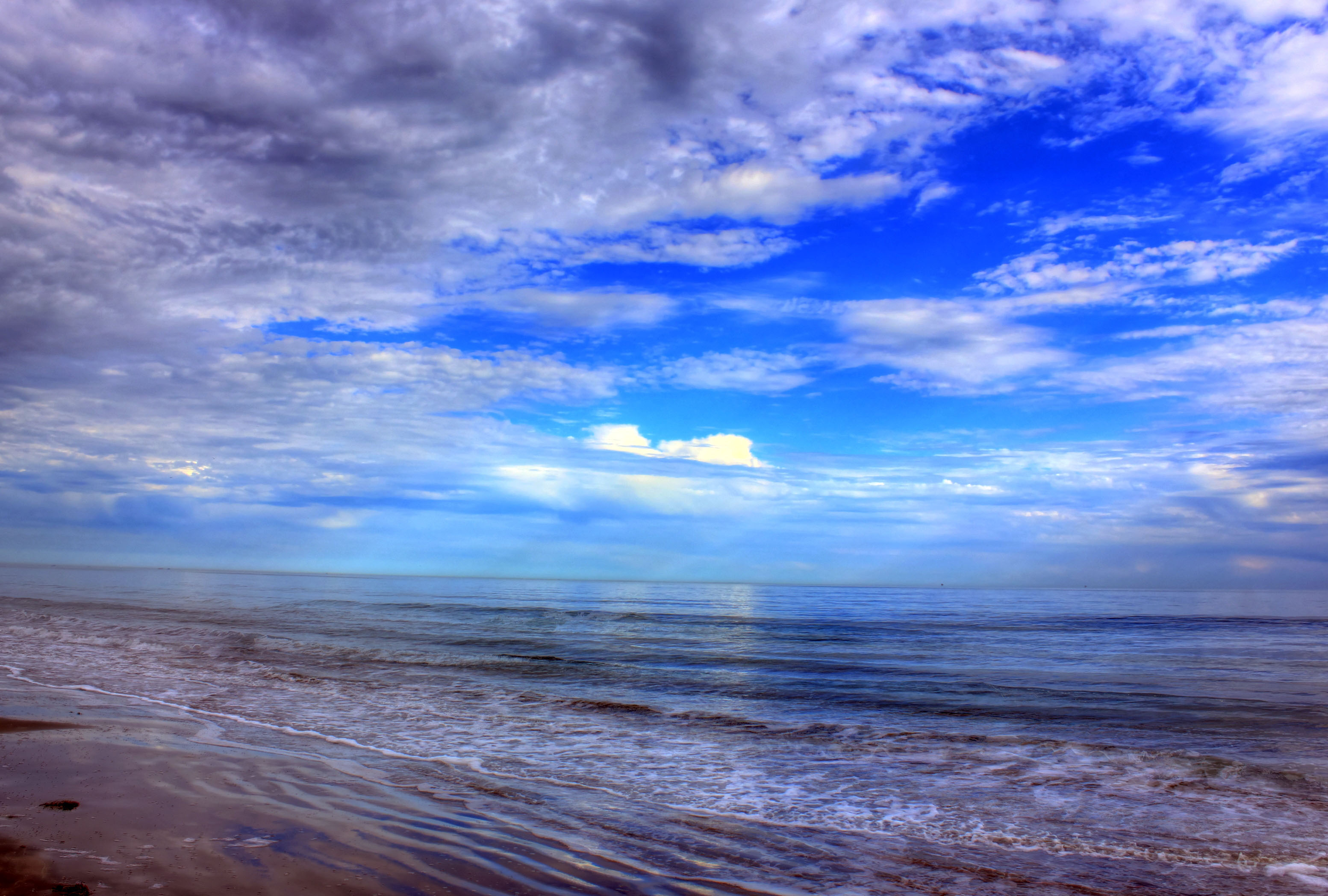
- Beach in the park on the Gulf of Mexico

- Location within Texas Location within the United States
- Location: Galveston Island, Galveston County, Texas, United States
- Nearest city: Galveston
- Coordinates: 29°11′56″N 94°57′22″W
- Area: 2,013.1 acres (815 ha)
- Established: 1975
- Visitors: 234,810 (in 2025)
- Operator: Texas Parks and Wildlife
- Website: Official website

Galveston Island State Park is a 2,013.1 acres (815 ha) state park located on western Galveston Island in Galveston County, on the western Gulf Coast in Texas, United States. The park opened in 1975 and is managed by the Texas Parks and Wildlife Department.

== Geography ==
The park protects dunes, estuaries, wetlands, brackish ponds, and beaches. It was established in 1975 and lies within the City of Galveston.

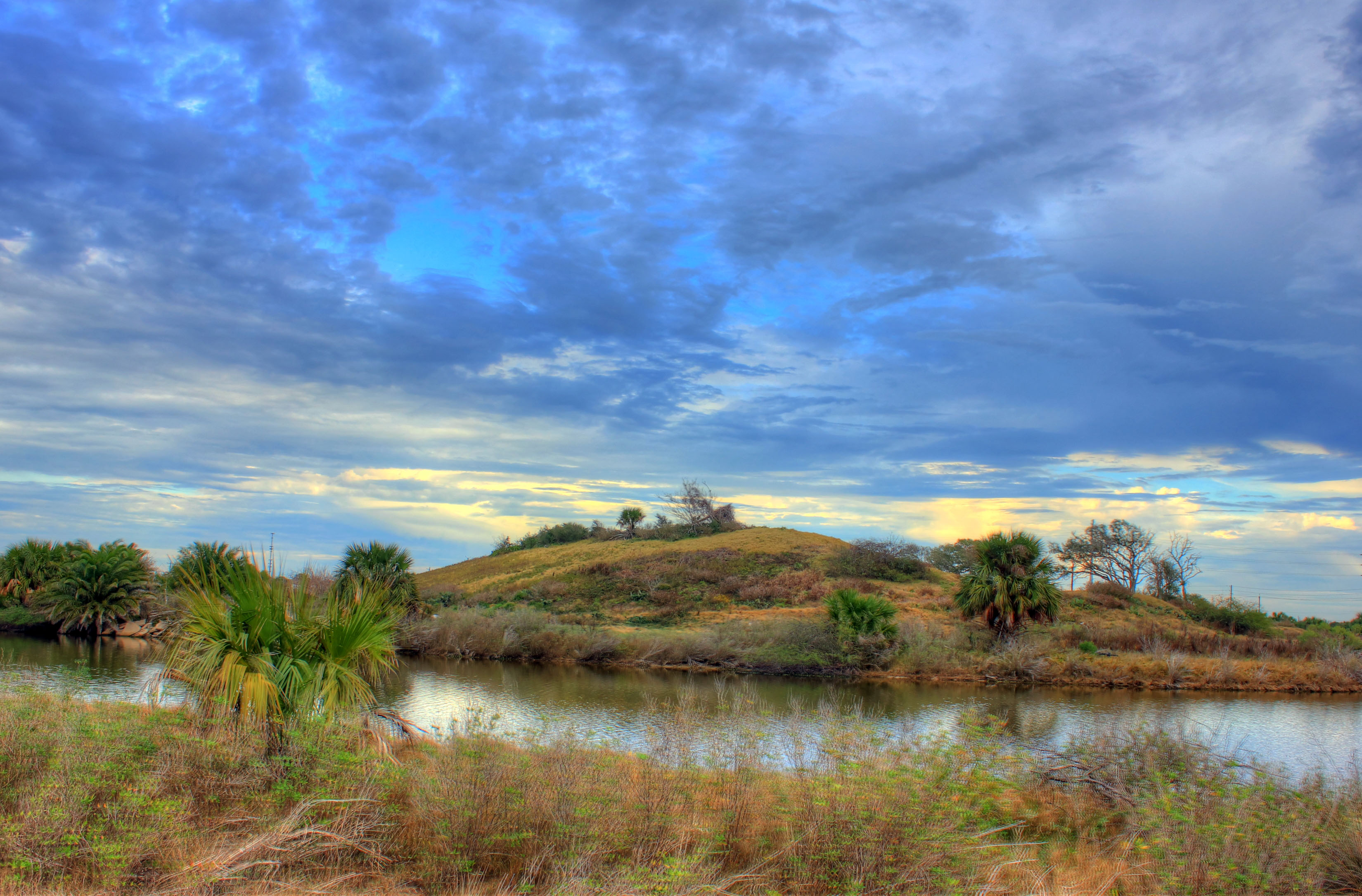
Coastal dune habitat in the park.

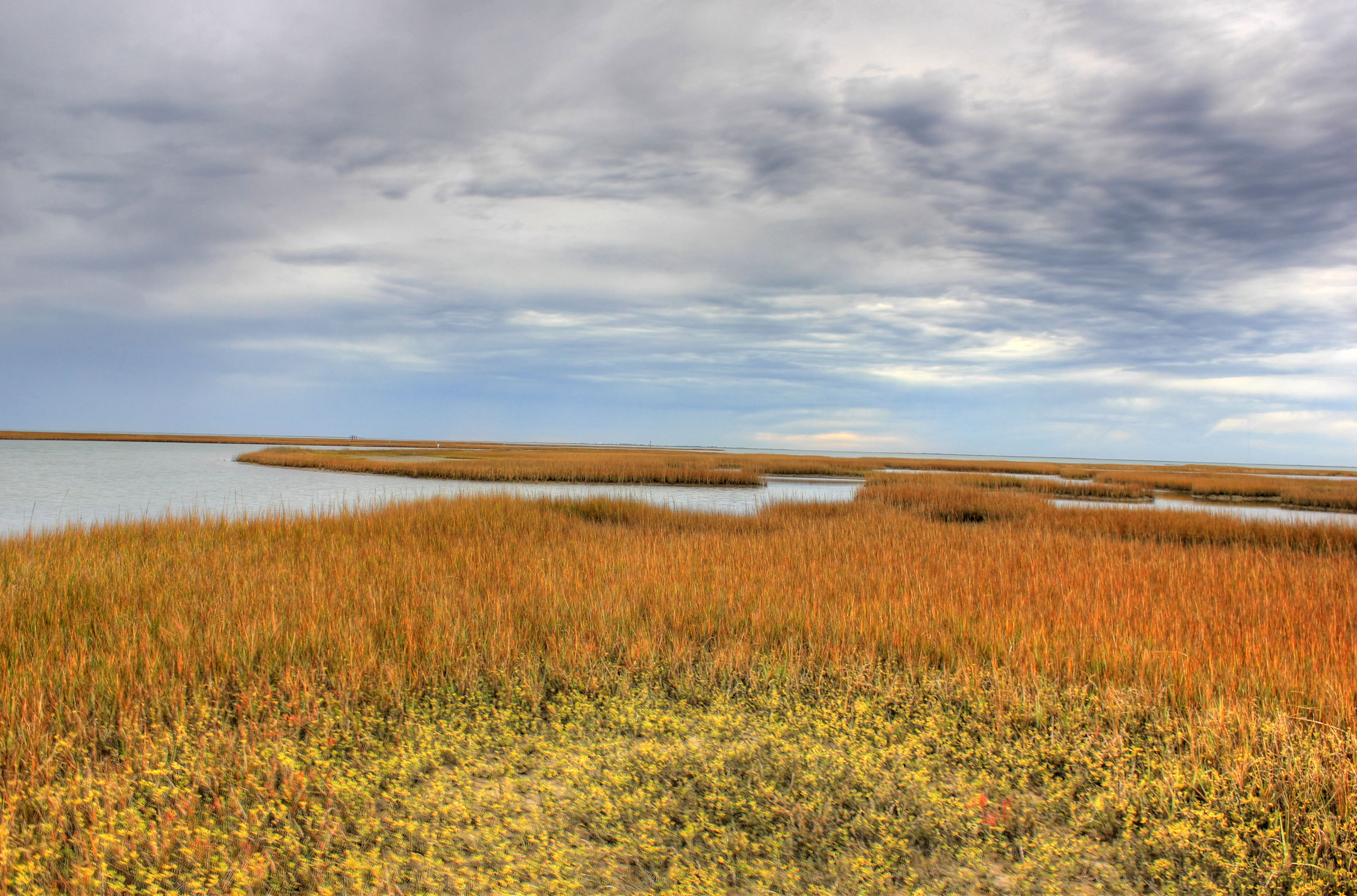
Wetlands in the park.

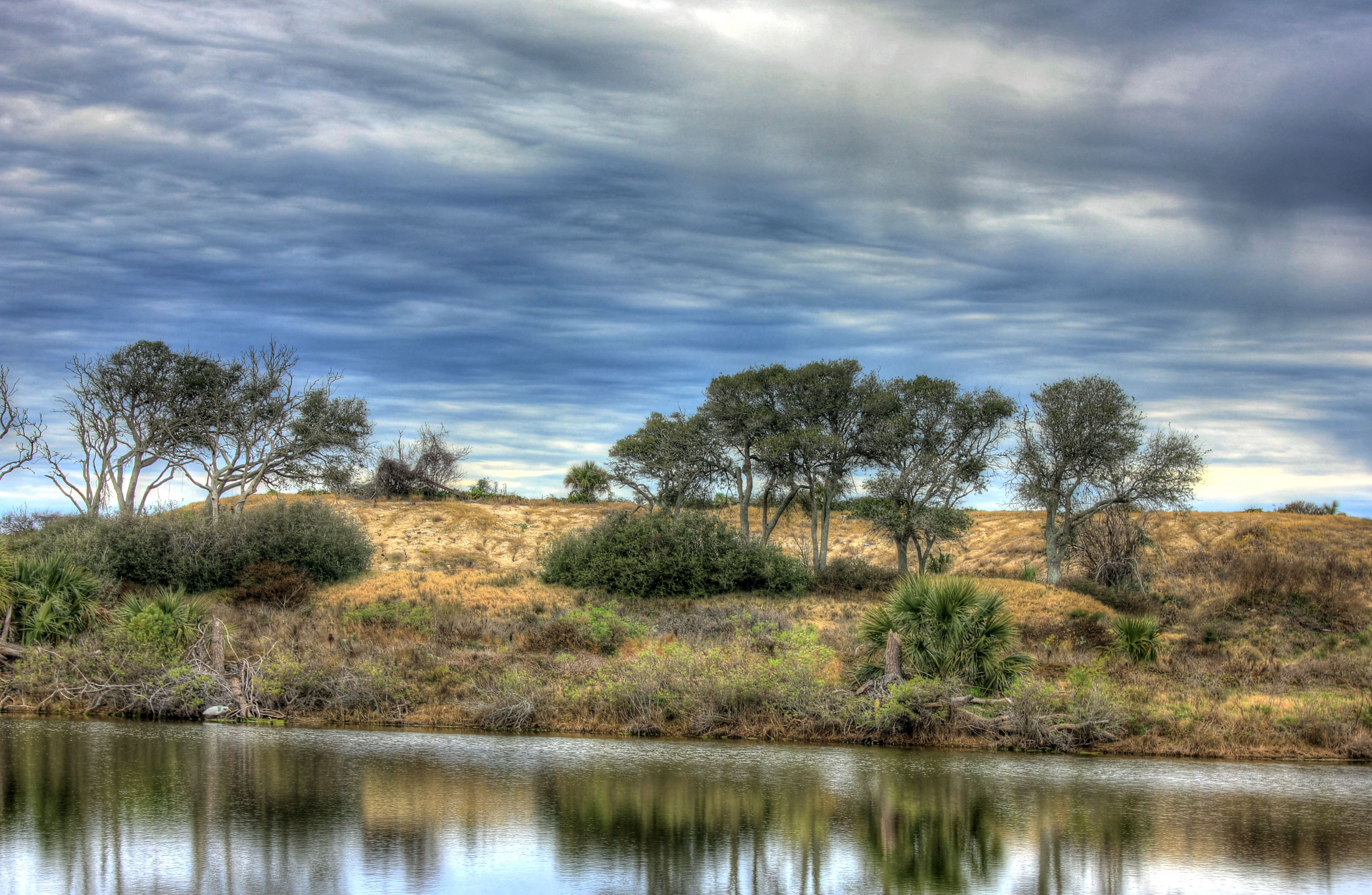
Restored dune habitat in the park.

Habitats include surf, beach, dunes, coastal prairie, fresh-water ponds, wetlands, bayous and bay shoreline. It has numerous trails for scenery and wildlife viewing. There is a public campground in the park.

== History ==
Galveston Island is a barrier island between Galveston Bay and the Gulf of Mexico. The island began to form around 5,000 years ago. It took another 3,000 years for the core to become high enough to withstand typical storm surges. American Indians began to visit Galveston Island around 2,000 years ago.

In the 16th century, Spanish exploration initiated European interaction with the indigenous Akokisa and Karankawa peoples. It is believed that Cabeza de Vaca and his crew were shipwrecked here in 1520 and eventually made their way from the island to colonial New Spain (México).

Jean and Pierre Lafitte, fleeing the prosecution of pirates in the Caribbean, established a "government" here in 1817, with visions of creating a "Manhattan on the Gulf." Commerce did thrive here, but major storms in 1867, 1871, 1875, and 1886 greatly slowed progress. The Galveston Hurricane of 1900 devastated the island, killing 5000 to 10,000 people, and prompted the construction of the seawall which protects the northern half of the island.

=== Park establishment ===
The saga of protecting the land began in 1950. Maco Stewart Jr., whose father founded Stewart Title Company, owned more than 2,000 acres on the island. In his will, he severed the mineral rights from the surface land rights and gave half of the surface and mineral rights to his wife, Virginia Stewart, and divided the other half between his sons from a former marriage, Wells and Maco III. In giving them the surface rights, the senior Maco specified that, upon the death of his wife and sons, his "Galveston Island home" should be given to the state of Texas "to be used and maintained as a fish, game, and oyster preserve and for any other public purpose." The will further stated that his heirs "shall not have any right or authority to convey, mortgage, encumber or in any manner dispose of the `surface' estate."

By the late 1960s, Stewart's heirs wanted a park to be established. In 1969, under the State Parks Bond Program, 1,950 acres of the private land was purchased from the heirs. A small part of the original property with the family's Stewart Mansion was not included in the sale. The state park opened to the public in 1975.

=== Dunes renewal projects ===
Tropical Storm Frances destroyed the sand dunes at Galveston Island State Park on September 10, 1998. The dunes provide the only protection that the park has for its freshwater habitats and visitor facilities. A project restored the dunes through the use of recycled Christmas trees to trap and accumulate sand.

The park was closed again, due to damage from Hurricane Ike on September 14, 2008. In July 2009 the park was reopened for outdoor recreation and camping.

== Nature ==
=== Animals ===
Coyote, white-tailed deer, raccoon, nine-banded armadillo Virginia opossum and marsh rabbit are mammals found in the park. The first nest in a decade of the Kemp's ridley sea turtle was found at the park in 2020. Laughing gull, sanderling, willet, great blue heron, snowy egret, roseate spoonbill and sandhill crane are a sampling of the more than 300 bird species recorded in the park.

=== Plants ===
Southern live oak dot the coastal prairie. Bitter panicgrass, beach morning-glory, and scarlet pimpernel help stabilize the dunes on the beach.

== See also ==
- Sand dune ecology
- List of Texas state parks
