= Hainesville, Texas =

- Unincorporated community
- Location within Texas Location within the United States
- Coordinates: 32°43′03″N 95°21′52″W
- Country: United States
- State: Texas
- County: Wood
- Elevation: 381 ft (116 m)
- Time zone: UTC-6 (Central (CST))
  - Summer (DST): UTC-5 (CDT)
- Area codes: 430, 903
- GNIS feature ID: 1378403

Hainesville is an unincorporated community in Wood County, Texas, United States. According to the Handbook of Texas, the community had a population of 74 in 2000.

== History ==
The area around Hainesville was settled in 1845, and Christian H. Haines built a gristmill there in 1870. The Dupree post office moved to the community in 1893; it was renamed Hainesville after Haines. His family owned a general store here. Another business was the office of Dr. James Marion Puckett, who may have started the community when he first practiced his doctoring. 25 people were living in the community in 1896 and were served by a blacksmith and cotton gin. The first Baptist church was organized in 1897. Hainesville had an agricultural economy; settlers primarily grew cotton but also farmed sugar cane, peanuts, melons and peaches. The town's post office closed in 1907. It had 200 residents, six businesses, and several churches in the 1930s. The population plummeted to 50 in 1949. Hainesville had a population of 74 from 1968 through 2000. Two churches, a company, and a community hall were depicted on a map of the area from 1988. Approximately 25 ancient rifles were reportedly found when ditches were dug during construction on the Haines mill, two miles south of Hainesville, in 1870. A few years later, on the adjoining Joe Moody property, the unmarked grave of a White man who was buried in a hewn-log coffin was discovered. According to local history, the body belonged to the French explorer René-Robert Cavelier, Sieur de La Salle, who was assassinated in East Texas in 1687. The remains may have actually belonged to a member of the Moscoso expedition, according to a 1950s idea. Both of these notions have typically been dismissed due to a lack of compelling evidence. Additionally, more investigation indicated that the rifles were not, as originally thought, from the 1500s, but rather from the 1700s.

An F1 tornado struck Hainesville on April 11, 1979. Another tornado hit on April 30, 2011, uprooting several trees.

== Geography ==
Hainesville is located at the intersection of Farm to Market Road 49 and Farm to Market Road 778, 7 miles (11 km) southeast of Quitman.

=== Climate ===
The climate in this area is characterized by hot, humid summers and generally mild to cool winters. According to the Köppen Climate Classification system, Hainesville has a humid subtropical climate, abbreviated "Cfa" on climate maps.

== Education ==
The community started out by having three music teachers in 1896. Its first school may have been hosted in a Methodist church that year and had 51 students enrolled. In 1905, it had 84 White students and 24 black students enrolled. Another school was built in the 1930s and both schools had 178 White and 26 Black students enrolled in 1932. Its schools merged with the Mineola and Quitman districts in the 1960s.
