= Coke, Texas =

- Unincorporated community
- Location within Texas Location within the United States
- Coordinates: 32°55′30″N 95°26′07″W
- Country: United States
- State: Texas
- County: Wood
- Elevation: 492 ft (150 m)
- Time zone: UTC-6 (Central (CST))
  - Summer (DST): UTC-5 (CDT)
- Area codes: 430 & 903
- GNIS feature ID: 1378141

Coke is an unincorporated community in Wood County, located in the U.S. state of Texas. According to the Handbook of Texas, Coke had a population of 105 in 2000.

== History ==
The population was 40 in 2010.

== Geography ==
Coke is located at the intersection of Farm to Market Roads 515 and 69, 10 mi (16 km) north of Quitman and 9 mi (14 km) west of Winnsboro in northern Wood County.

== Education ==
The first teacher came to Coke in 1892. It then had a school in the 1930s, which was still in operation in 1960 and 1988. Today, the community is served by the Quitman Independent School District.

In 1965, the school had only 19 students total in all eight grades. The school was universally referred to as the Coke School, however it was actually named Lloyd Common School, and it consolidated with the Quitman Independent School District and ceased operation at the end of the 64–65 school year.

In 1988, the school building was still there and community and private events were held there. The school building was sold in 2020 to a private party.

The Coke/Pleasant Grove Volunteer Fire Department was located at the school until 2018–2019. The Coke store was torn down in 2017 and a new building for the VFD was built at that location.
