= East Point, Texas =

- Unincorporated community
- Location within Texas Location within the United States
- Coordinates: 32°49′52″N 95°17′52″W
- Country: United States
- State: Texas
- County: Wood
- Elevation: 446 ft (136 m)
- Time zone: UTC-6 (Central (CST))
  - Summer (DST): UTC-5 (CDT)
- Area codes: 430 & 903
- GNIS feature ID: 1380844

East Point is an unincorporated community in Wood County, located in the U.S. state of Texas. According to the Handbook of Texas, East Point had a population of 40 in 2000.

== Geography ==
East Point is located at the intersection of Farm to Market Roads 312 and 2088, 8 mi (13 km) east of Quitman and 9 mi (14 km) south of Winnsboro in east-central Wood County.

== Education ==
Today, the community is served by the Winnsboro Independent School District.
