= Lake Winnsboro =

Lake in Wood County, Texas, United States

- Location within Texas
- Location: Wood County, Texas, United States
- Coordinates: 32°54′03.2″N 95°21′03.6″W
- Type: reservoir
- Primary inflows: Big Sandy Creek
- Primary outflows: Big Sandy Creek
- Built: June 15, 1961
- First flooded: July 1, 1962
- Surface area: 806 acres (326 ha)
- Max. depth: 23 ft (7.0 m)
- Surface elevation: 128 m (420 ft)

Lake Winnsboro is a lake located south-west of Winnsboro, Texas, and north-east of Quitman.

The lake is located within the Sabine River basin.

The lake has a capacity of 8,100 acre-feet.

Construction on the reservoir began on June 15, 1961. Impoundment of water began on July 1, 1962. In 1966 the crest of the service spillway was raised 2 feet.

The following types of fish are found in this lake: Largemouth Bass, Channel Catfish, Blue Catfish, Crappie, Bluegill, and Redear Sunfish. Lone Star Bass and Florida Largemouth Bass (both strains of Largemouth Bass) have been stocked into this lake. Channel Catfish, Blue Catfish, and Flathead Catfish have also been stocked.

== Recreation ==
There are 3 boat ramps on this lake, all 3 with picnic areas. There is also a privately owned bait shop with a restaurant, motel, and RV park.
