= Little Hope, Texas =

- Unincorporated community
- Location within Texas Location within the United States
- Coordinates: 32°46′46″N 95°15′25″W
- Country: United States
- State: Texas
- County: Wood
- Elevation: 413 ft (126 m)
- Time zone: UTC-6 (Central (CST))
  - Summer (DST): UTC-5 (CDT)
- Area codes: 430, 903
- GNIS feature ID: 1380875

Little Hope is an unincorporated community in Wood County, located in the U.S. state of Texas. According to the Handbook of Texas, Little Hope had a population of 25 in 2000. When the nearby Little Hope Missionary Baptist Church was established in 1881, it was said that it had little hope of surviving more than a year.

== Geography ==
Little Hope is located at the intersection of Farm to Market Roads 312 and 154, 10 mi (16 km) east of Quitman and 12 mi (19 km) east of Winnsboro in eastern Wood County.

== Education ==
Today, the community is served by the Winnsboro Independent School District.
