= Stout, Texas =

- Unincorporated community
- Location within Texas Location within the United States
- Coordinates: 32°52′19″N 95°17′48″W
- Country: United States
- State: Texas
- County: Wood
- Elevation: 459 ft (140 m)
- Time zone: UTC-6 (Central (CST))
  - Summer (DST): UTC-5 (CDT)
- Area codes: 430, 903
- GNIS feature ID: 1380930

Stout is an unincorporated community in Wood County, located in the U.S. state of Texas. According to the Handbook of Texas, Stout had a population of 86 in 2000.

== Geography ==
Stout is located on Farm to Market Road 312, 6 mi (9.7 km) south of Winnsboro and 10 mi (16 km) northeast of Quitman in northeastern Wood County.

== Education ==
Stout had its own school in 1900. It was still operational in the mid-1930s. The school had 115 students in 10 grade levels taught by four teachers. Today, the community is served by the Hawkins Independent School District.
