= Forest Hill, Wood County, Texas =

- Unincorporated community
- Location within Texas Location within the United States
- Coordinates: 32°50′11″N 95°25′05″W
- Country: United States
- State: Texas
- County: Wood
- Elevation: 463 ft (141 m)
- Time zone: UTC-6 (Central (CST))
  - Summer (DST): UTC-5 (CDT)
- Area codes: 430 & 903
- GNIS feature ID: 1380854

Forest Hill is an unincorporated community in Wood County, located in the U.S. state of Texas. According to the Handbook of Texas, Forest Hill had a population of 30 in 2000.

== Geography ==
Forest Hill is located on Texas State Highway 37, 3 mi (4.8 km) northeast of Quitman in north-central Wood County.

== Education ==
Forest Hill had its own school in the 1930s. It was originally known as Ratscuffle due to an infestation of rats. Today, the community is served by the Quitman Independent School District.
