= Oak Grove, Wood County, Texas =

- Unincorporated community
- Location within Texas Location within the United States
- Coordinates: 32°49′17″N 95°20′42″W
- Country: United States
- State: Texas
- County: Wood
- Elevation: 482 ft (147 m)
- Time zone: UTC-6 (Central (CST))
  - Summer (DST): UTC-5 (CDT)
- Area codes: 430, 903
- GNIS feature ID: 1380894

Oak Grove is an unincorporated community in Wood County, located in the U.S. state of Texas. According to the Handbook of Texas, Oak Grove had a population of 74 in 2000.

== Geography ==
Oak Grove is located at the intersection of Farm to Market Roads 14 and 2088, 7 mi (11 km) east of Quitman in north-central Wood County.

== Education ==
Today, the community is served by the Quitman Independent School District.
