= Pleasant Grove, Wood County, Texas =

- Unincorporated community
- Location within Texas Location within the United States
- Coordinates: 32°55′33″N 95°23′54″W
- Country: United States
- State: Texas
- County: Wood
- Elevation: 463 ft (141 m)
- Time zone: UTC-6 (Central (CST))
  - Summer (DST): UTC-5 (CDT)
- Area codes: 430, 903
- GNIS feature ID: 1378881

Pleasant Grove is an unincorporated community in Wood County, located in the U.S. state of Texas. According to the Handbook of Texas, Pleasant Grove had a population of 30 in 2000.

== Geography ==
Pleasant Grove is located on Farm to Market Road 515, 6.5 mi (10.5 km) west of Winnsboro in northern Wood County.

== Education ==
Schools were built in 1874 and 1904, and a college was built in or around the year 1907. By the 1930s, the settlement only had one school recorded as existing. Today, the community is served by the Winnsboro Independent School District.
