= Quitman High School (Texas) =

Location
- 1101 East Goode Street; Quitman, Wood County, Texas 75783-1640; United States; 32.7974°N 95.4283°W

Information
- School type: Public, high school
- Motto: Educating Every Child...Every Chance...Every Day
- School district: Quitman Independent School District
- Educational authority: Texas Education Agency
- Superintendent: Rhonda Turner
- CEEB code: 445775
- NCES School ID: 483630004078
- Principal: Dana Hamrick
- Teaching staff: 35.95 (FTE)
- Grades: 9–12
- Enrollment: 353 (2023–2024)
- Student to teacher ratio: 9.82
- Campus type: TEA - Non-metropolitan Stable; NCES - Town-Distant
- Colors: Red, white, and blue
- Athletics conference: University Interscholastic League Class AAA
- Sports: Baseball; basketball; cross country; football; golf; powerlifting; softball; tennis; track; volleyball
- Mascot: Bulldogs
- USNWR ranking: 7,863 (2020)
- Yearbook: The Growl
- Website: www.quitmanisd.net/page/quitman-high-school/

Quitman High School is a public high school located in the city of Quitman, Texas. It is a part of the Quitman Independent School District located in central Wood County.

== Academics ==
=== Enrollment ===
As of the 2017–18 school year, the school had an enrollment of 294 students and 31.08 classroom teachers (on an FTE basis), for a student–teacher ratio of 9.46. There were 119 students eligible for free lunch and 24 eligible for reduced-cost lunch. The student population at Quitman is predominantly White, with a large Hispanic and Latino Americans.

In 2018, the school was rated Met Standard by the Texas Education Agency.

=== Awards ===
In 2018, the school was recognized for Academic Achievement in English Language Arts (ELA)/Reading by the Texas Education Agency.

=== Programs ===
==== Advanced Placement (AP) ====
Quitman offers Advanced Placement courses, which are provided by the Texas Virtual School Network.

==== Career and Technical Education (CTE) ====
In addition to the standard curriculum, the school also offers career and technical education (CTE) programs in the following fields.

- Agriculture
- Business Education
- Education and Training
- Finance
- Family and Consumer Sciences
- Health Science
- Industrial Technologies

== Extracurricular activities ==
=== Athletics ===
As of 2019, the school offered varsity and junior varsity sports teams for boys and girls, with an additional ninth grade girls volleyball team. These sports are run under the direction of Athletic Director Bryan Oakes and include baseball, basketball, cross country, football, golf, powerlifting, softball, tennis, track and volleyball.

Football games are played at Bud Moody Stadium. Basketball and volleyball games are played at the Delbert Ballard Gymnasium.

==== State titles ====
- Boys Golf
  - 2010 (UIL Class AA)

===== State finalist =====
- Boys Basketball
  - 1945 (UIL Class A)
- Volleyball
  - 1988 (UIL Class AA)
  - 2005 (UIL Class AA)

== Notable alumni ==
- Sissy Spacek – Class of 1967, actress and singer.
