= Winnsboro High School =

Location
- 409 Newsome Street; Winnsboro, Texas 75494-2628; United States; 32.953315°N 95.295551°W

Information
- School type: Public high school
- School district: Winnsboro Independent School District
- Principal: David Pinnell
- Teaching staff: 44.92 (FTE)
- Grades: 9-12
- Enrollment: 496 (2023-2024)
- Student to teacher ratio: 11.12
- Colors: Red & Black
- Athletics conference: UIL Class 3A
- Website: www.winnsboroisd.org

Winnsboro High School is a public high school located in the city of Winnsboro, Texas, United States and classified as a 3A school by the University Interscholastic League (UIL). It is a part of the Winnsboro Independent School District located in northeastern Wood County. In 2015, the school was rated "Met Standard" by the Texas Education Agency.

== Athletics ==
The Winnsboro Red Raiders compete in these sports -

- Baseball
- Basketball
- Cross Country
- Football
- Golf
- Powerlifting
- Softball
- Tennis
- Track and Field

=== State Titles ===
- Girls Basketball -
  - 1999(3A), 2000(3A), 2001(3A)

==== State Finalists ====
- Girls Basketball -
  - 1991(3A), 1992(3A), 1998(3A), 2004(3A), 2007(2A), 2022(3A)
- Boys Track
  - 2013(2A)
