= Ogburn, Texas =

- Unincorporated community
- Location within Texas Location within the United States
- Coordinates: 32°50′24″N 95°13′21″W
- Country: United States
- State: Texas
- County: Wood
- Elevation: 600 ft (180 m)
- Time zone: UTC-6 (Central (CST))
  - Summer (DST): UTC-5 (CDT)
- Area codes: 430, 903
- GNIS feature ID: 1378786

Ogburn is an unincorporated community in Wood County, located in the U.S. state of Texas. According to the Handbook of Texas, Ogburn had a population of 10 in 2000.

== Geography ==
Ogburn is located just off Farm to Market Road 2088, 15 mi (24 km) east of Quitman in eastern Wood County.

== Education ==
Ogburn's school closed sometime in the 1940s. Today, the community is served by the Winnsboro Independent School District.
