= Cartwright, Texas =

- Unincorporated community
- Location within Texas Location within the United States
- Coordinates: 32°52′19″N 95°22′17″W
- Country: United States
- State: Texas
- County: Wood
- Elevation: 466 ft (142 m)
- Time zone: UTC-6 (Central (CST))
  - Summer (DST): UTC-5 (CDT)
- Area codes: 430 & 903
- GNIS feature ID: 1380827

Cartwright is an unincorporated community in Wood County, located in the U.S. state of Texas. According to the Handbook of Texas, Cartwright had a population of 61 in 2000.

== History ==
The area in what is known as Cartwright today was first settled as early as 1851. It was originally called "the Barrens" because of its isolation and the danger from wolves. It was most likely named for local settler Matthew Cartwright. A post office was established at Cartwright in 1894 and remained in operation until 1907. During that time, it had a store and a Baptist church. Two years later, the community had eight businesses, which included two carpenters, a barber, a gin, and a mill. The population was 100 in the 1930s and had a seasonal industry and several scattered houses. It went down to 75 in 1945 and remained there until the mid-1960s. It further declined to 61 from 1968 through 2000. The 1988 county highway map showed two businesses, a church, and a community center in Cartwright.

== Geography ==
Cartwright is located on Farm to Market Road 1643, 7 mi (11 km) northeast of Quitman in north-central Wood County.

== Education ==
A log school was built here in 1874. The Cartwright family donated land for another school to be built in 1882. It burned to the ground in 1895 and was replaced by another building with two classrooms. It had 92 White students enrolled in it that next year. It had two music teachers and three regular classroom teachers in 1905, serving 149 students. There were two schools in Cartwright in the 1930s, and both closed sometime after 1960. Today, the community is served by the Quitman Independent School District.
