= Perryville, Wood County, Texas =

Perryville, Texas
- Unincorporated community
- Location within Texas Location within the United States
- Coordinates: 32°51′56″N 95°09′28″W
- Country: United States
- State: Texas
- County: Wood
- Elevation: 502 ft (153 m)
- Time zone: UTC-6 (Central (CST))
  - Summer (DST): UTC-5 (CDT)
- Area codes: 430, 903
- GNIS feature ID: 1378850

Perryville is an unincorporated community in Wood County, located in the U.S. state of Texas. According to the Handbook of Texas, Perryville had a population of 52 in 2000.

== Geography ==
Perryville is located at the intersection of Farm to Market Roads 2088 and 852, 8 mi (13 km) southeast of Winnsboro and 19 mi (31 km) northeast of Quitman in northeastern Wood County.

== Education ==
Perryville had a school in 1900 and had another one in the 1940s. Today, the community is served by the Union Hill Independent School District.

== Notable person ==
- Ray Price, musician, was born on a farm near Perryville.
