= Fouke, Texas =

- Unincorporated community
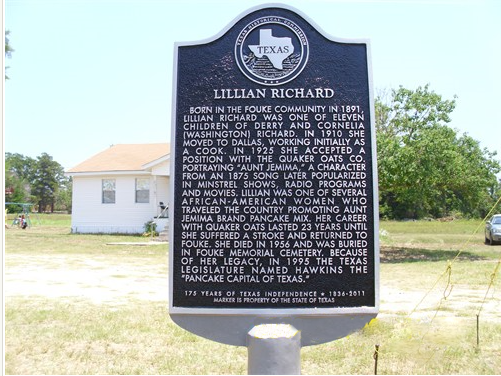
- Historical marker dedicated to Lillian Richard, Aunt Jemima portrayer

- Location within Texas Location within the United States
- Coordinates: 32°37′41″N 95°16′27″W
- Country: United States
- State: Texas
- County: Wood
- Elevation: 469 ft (143 m)
- Time zone: UTC-6 (Central (CST))
  - Summer (DST): UTC-5 (CDT)
- Area codes: 430 & 903
- GNIS feature ID: 1378318

Fouke is an unincorporated community in Wood County, located in the U.S. state of Texas. According to the Handbook of Texas, Fouke had a population of 30 in 2000.

== History ==
On April 28, 1912, an F1 tornado hit Fouke, killing two women beneath a fallen tree. 10 other people were injured.

== Education ==
Today, Fouke is served by the Hawkins Independent School District.

== Notable person ==
- Lillian Richard, actress
