= Mineola High School =

Mineola High School may refer to:

- Mineola High School (New York)
- Mineola High School (Texas)
