= New Hope, Wood County, Texas =

- Unincorporated community
- Location within Texas Location within the United States
- Coordinates: 32°39′23″N 95°25′06″W
- Country: United States
- State: Texas
- County: Wood
- Elevation: 430 ft (130 m)
- Time zone: UTC-6 (Central (CST))
  - Summer (DST): UTC-5 (CDT)
- Area codes: 430, 903
- GNIS feature ID: 1378742

New Hope is an unincorporated community in Wood County, located in the U.S. state of Texas. According to the Handbook of Texas, New Hope had a population of 15 in 2000.

== Education ==
Today, the community is served by the Mineola Independent School District.
