= Andrews, Wood County, Texas =

Ghost town in Texas, US

Andrews
- Ghost town
- Location in Texas
- Coordinates: 32°49′17″N 95°20′42″W
- Country: United States
- State: Texas
- County: Wood

Andrews is a ghost town in Wood County, Texas, United States. A post office operated there from 1885 to 1906. At its peak in 1896, it had a population of 100.
