= Winnsboro News =

The Winnsboro News
- Type: Weekly newspaper
- Format: Broadsheet
- Owner(s): Chuck and Nancy Roy
- Managing editor: Jim Willis
- Founded: September 24, 1908 (117 years ago)
- Language: English
- Headquarters: 105 East Locust
- City: Winnsboro, Texas 75494-2519
- Country: United States
- Circulation: 1,383 (as of 2023)
- ISSN: 8755-948X
- OCLC number: 11429689
- Website: thewinnsboronews.com

The Winnsboro News is a weekly newspaper in Winnsboro, Texas, serving Wood and Franklin Counties.

== History ==
Stories differ on how the newspaper was formed. Histories of the city of Winnsboro indicate that the newspaper was formed in 1908 by a merger of the "wet" and "dry" newspapers in the town—one newspaper serving those holding views against the sale of liquors and one serving those holding views favoring the sale of liquors—the Winnsboro News and the Winnsboro Messenger. The Texas Press Association, however, fixes September 24, 1908 as the specific date of the founding of the News as a weekly newspaper. The newspaper was later sold to Judge R. M. Smith. A former publisher, Grayford M. Jones, built the current 9,800-square-foot (910 m^{2}) newspaper plant for the News on Locust Street in Winnsboro. The plant has a five-unit Goss Community press. The newspaper is currently owned by Chuck and Nancy Roy, who bought the newspaper on January 1, 2022.

== Controversy ==
=== LGBTQ harassment ===
In August 2003, the newspaper gained notoriety for publishing an editorial by publisher Tom Pendergast outing an LGBTQ couple living in the city.
