= Pineview, Texas =

- Unincorporated community
- Location within Texas Location within the United States
- Coordinates: 32°54′28″N 95°09′37″W
- Country: United States
- State: Texas
- County: Wood
- Elevation: 502 ft (153 m)
- Time zone: UTC-6 (Central (CST))
  - Summer (DST): UTC-5 (CDT)
- Area codes: 430, 903
- GNIS feature ID: 1378870

Pineview is an unincorporated community in Wood County, located in the U.S. state of Texas. According to the Handbook of Texas, Pineview had a population of 10 in 2000.

== History ==
Pineview was most likely named for the landscape and may have begun in the early 20th century. The 1936 county highway map showed several farms in Pineview. It was served by a cemetery and church in the mid-1990s. Only 10 people lived here in 2000.

== Geography ==
Pineview is located near the intersection of Farm to Market Roads 1647 and 2455, 8 mi (13 km) southeast of Winnsboro in the northeastern corner of Wood County.

== Education ==
Pineview is served by the Pittsburg Independent School District.
