= Hoard, Texas =

- Unincorporated community
- Location within Texas Location within the United States
- Coordinates: 32°38′29″N 95°23′15″W
- Country: United States
- State: Texas
- County: Wood
- Elevation: 387 ft (118 m)
- Time zone: UTC-6 (Central (CST))
  - Summer (DST): UTC-5 (CDT)
- Area codes: 430, 903
- GNIS feature ID: 1378458

Hoard is an unincorporated community in Wood County, located in the U.S. state of Texas. According to the Handbook of Texas, Hoard had a population of 45 in 2000.

== Geography ==
Hoard is located at the intersection of U.S. Highway 80 and Farm to Market Road 1801, 6 mi (9.7 km) east of Mineola in southern Wood County.

== Education ==
Today, the community is served by the Mineola Independent School District.
