= KWNS =

- Winnsboro, Texas; United States
- Broadcast area: Mount Pleasant, Texas; Sulphur Springs, Texas
- Frequency: 104.7 MHz

Programming
- Format: Contemporary Christian

Ownership
- Owner: Lottie L. Foster

History
- First air date: September 13, 1982
- Call sign meaning: Winnsboro

Technical information
- Licensing authority: FCC
- Facility ID: 56175
- Class: A
- ERP: 2750 watts
- HAAT: 492.1 feet (150.0 m)
- Transmitter coordinates: 33°04′17.40″N 95°17′22.80″W

Links
- Public license information: Public file; LMS
- Website: kwnsradio.com

KWNS (104.7 MHz FM) is a radio station broadcasting a Southern Gospel format. The station is licensed to Winnsboro, Texas, United States, and is owned by Lottie L. Foster.

The letters KWNS were the original call letters of the AM radio station in Pratt, Kansas, when it started in 1962. In the early 1980's the call letters were bought by Richard and Lottie Foster and the format was changed from country to Southern Gospel. After Richard's passing, his wife Lottie continued running the station. In 2021-2022, Lottie's granddaughter Kim Foster took over as station manager and the family has updated the station to a more Contemporary Christian (CCM) format.
