= Mineola High School (Texas) =

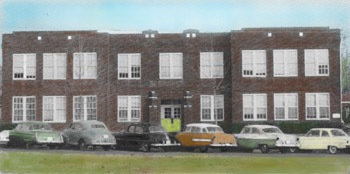
- Mineola High School in 1960

Location
- 900 W Patten Street; Mineola, Texas 75773-1617; United States; 32°40′14″N 95°30′01″W

Information
- School type: Public high school
- Established: 1914
- School district: Mineola Independent School District
- Principal: Adam McMahon
- Teaching staff: 50.06 (FTE)
- Grades: 9–12
- Enrollment: 480 (2023–2024)
- Student to teacher ratio: 9.59
- Colors: Orange & White
- Athletics conference: UIL Class 3A
- Mascot: Yellow Jacket/Lady Yellow Jacket
- Yearbook: The Yellowjacket
- Website: Mineola High School

Mineola High School is a public high school located in Mineola, Texas in southern Wood County and classified as a 3A school by the UIL. It is a part of the Mineola Independent School District and serves the city of Mineola and portions of unincorporated Wood County. Notable alumni include retired Admiral Bobby Inman, country music singer Kacey Musgraves. In 2015, the school was rated "Met Standard" by the Texas Education Agency.

== History ==
Until 1901, all students in Mineola attended school in a two-story brick building in "Block C" of the city. That same year, the school board authorized the construction of a two-story frame building and the high school students were educated in this building with all other grades until a separate high school was constructed in 1914. That school was destroyed by a fire on March 27, 1924. A new school was opened in 1925, and razed in 1968. This building was located in the 400 block of West Blair Street. The present high school was constructed in 1968.

Until 1901, a two-story brick building in "block C," in the city housed Mineola's only school. That year, the school board authorized the construction of a two-story frame building and high school was held there with all other grades until the separate high school was built in 1914. The new high school suffered a fire in 1924, and was immediately rebuilt.

Mineola High School was an all-white school until the fall of 1966, when the old South Ward school, known formally as Addie E. McFarland High School and Mineola schools were integrated.

== Athletics ==
The Mineola Yellow Jackets compete in these sports -

Cross Country, Volleyball, Football, Basketball, Powerlifting, Golf, Tennis, Track, Softball & Baseball

=== State Champions ===
- Football
  - 2016(3A/D1)

==== State Finalists ====
- Football
  - 2014(3A/D1)

Mineola's stadium from 1914-1992 was called Yellowjacket Stadium. It was replaced in name, location, and structure in 1993 with the opening of Meredith Memorial Stadium, one of the first concrete bowl stadiums created for a small school in Texas. The first event was held in the new stadium in the fall of 1993. At the time the stadium opened for athletic events in the fall of 1993, it did not have a track, paved parking lot, or on-site locker rooms.

== Theatre ==
The theater department of Mineola High School is known as Act I & Company. Act I & Company has won the UIL One Act Play Championship in conference 3A seven times. Of those seven championships, five were consecutive wins.

=== State Titles ===
- One Act Play -
  - 1987(3A), 1988(3A), 1989(3A), 1990(3A), 1991(3A), 1994(3A), 1995(3A)

== Band ==
The Mineola High School band (also known as “The Sound of the Swarm”) advanced to the UIL State marching contest for the first in 2015 with their show “Zodiac” and placed 3rd in 3A State Marching Band contest. The band returned to the State Marching Contest two years later in 2017 with their show entitled “Soliloquy” where the band won the 3A State Marching Band contest. The band repeated their success in 2019 where they won the 3A State Marching Band contest with their show entitled “Car Man.” The band won the 3A State Marching Band contest for a third time in 2021 with their show entitled “Hometown.”

The band place second in the 3A State Marching Band contest in 2023 with their show “Carry the Torch,” then won their fourth title in 2024 with their show titled “Amped Up.” Most recently, the band won their fifth state title in 2025 with their show titled “Viewfinder.” With this title, Mineola currently has the most 3A marching band championships, surpassing Denver City High School (85, 87, 88, 89).

The band has also been UIL Honor Band multiple times. The band was also awarded the Sudler shield in February 2020.

=== State Titles ===
- Marching Band
  - 2017 (3A), 2019 (3A), 2021 (3A), 2024 (3A), 2025 (3A)

== Notable alumni ==
- Bryan Hughes (Class of 1987), member of the Texas House of Representatives from House District 5.
- Bobby Ray Inman (Class of 1946), former Deputy Director of the Central Intelligence Agency, U.S. Naval Admiral, nominated by President Clinton to be Secretary of Defense of the United States.
- Adam Moore (Class of 2002) is an American professional baseball catcher in the Tampa Bay Rays organization.
- Kacey Musgraves (Class of 2006) Grammy winning country music artist and performer.
- Dawson Pendergrass (Class of 2023), college football running back for the Baylor Bears
- Mack Tuck (Class of 1993) is a retired American basketball player and current professional basketball coach
- Noble Willingham, television and film actor known for The Last Picture Show and Walker, Texas Ranger.
- Scott Burgess (Class of 1981) Composer, Sound Designer - ten-time nominee and a two-time winner of the Helen Hayes Award.

== See also ==
- List of school districts in Texas
