= Big Sandy Creek (Sabine River tributary) =

Coordinates: 32.55625°N 95.07967°W

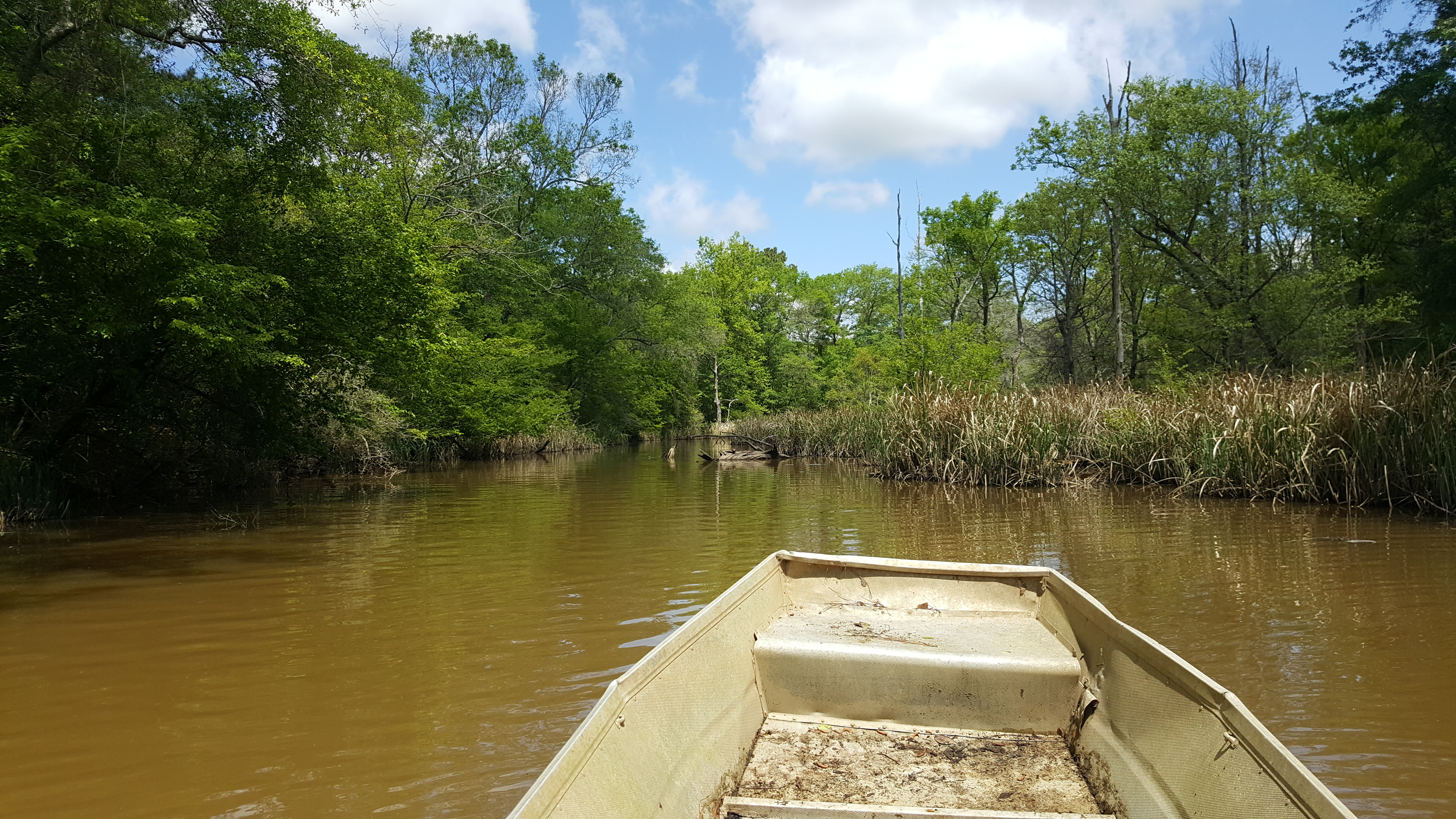
- Big Sandy Creek in Wood County, Texas
- Map

Location
- Country: United States
- State: Texas

Big Sandy Creek is a 58.0-mile-long (93.3 km) tributary of the Sabine River in Franklin, Wood and Upshur counties in northeastern Texas, United States.

== See also ==
- List of rivers of Texas
