= Little Sandy National Wildlife Refuge =

National Wildlife Refuge in east Texas

- IUCN category V (protected landscape/seascape)
- Interactive map of Little Sandy National Wildlife Refuge
- Location: Wood County, Texas, United States
- Nearest city: Mineola, Texas and Hawkins, Texas
- Coordinates: 32°34′33″N 95°14′50″W
- Area: 7,800 acres (32 km^{2})
- Established: 1986
- Governing body: U.S. Fish and Wildlife Service
- Website: Little Sandy National Wildlife Refuge

U.S. National Natural Landmark
- Designated: May 1986

The Little Sandy National Wildlife Refuge is National Wildlife Refuge of 3,802 acres in Wood County, Texas. Unlike most National Wildlife Refuges maintained by the U.S. Fish and Wildlife Service, the public is not allowed access to the refuge. The land is privately owned, but protected by a conservation easement.

== Location ==
The refuge is located approximately 12.6 miles from the intersection of US Highways 80 and 69. It is bounded by the Sabine River on the south, US Highway 80 to north, and by private property on the east and west.

== History and development ==
As early as 1898, sportsmen from nearby Dallas searched the east Texas area along the Texas & Pacific Railroad looking for land on which to establish a club to hunt small game such as squirrel and duck, and to fish. They sought a large, wooded area, and thus passed from the blackland prairie of Texas in to the post oak savanna of East Texas and found the deciduous forest located around Little Sandy Creek when the train they were on stopped for water. At the time, Little Sandy Creek was vital to the Texas & Pacific Railroad's operation as it allowed them to get waters for their boilers. The stop was originally called Angler, Texas.

The site became the site of the Little Sandy Hunting and Fishing Club.

The land for the club was acquired between 1898 and 1902, and the club was formally established in 1902. The site was established as a National Wildlife Refuge in 1986.

== Geography and topography ==
The site is located within the Sabine River Floodplain. It is considered bottomland forest. It includes oxbow lakes, oxbow lakes with shrub swamps, and is considered by some to be the last substantial block of old growth bottomland hardwood forest in Texas.
