= List of Farm to Market Roads in Texas (1800–1899) =

- Texas Farm to Market Road and Ranch to Market Road markers

Highway names
- Interstates: Interstate Highway X (IH-X, I-X)
- US Highways: U.S. Highway X (US X)
- State: State Highway X (SH X)
- Loops: Loop X
- Spurs: Spur X
- Recreational: Recreational Road X (RE X)
- Farm or Ranch to Market Roads: Farm to Market Road X (FM X); Ranch to Market Road X (RM X)
- Park Roads: Park Road X (PR X)

System links
- Highways in Texas; Interstate; US; State; Former; Toll; Loops; Spurs; FM/RM; Park; Rec

Farm to Market Roads in Texas are owned and maintained by the Texas Department of Transportation (TxDOT).

== FM 1800 ==
Farm to Market Road 1800
- Location: Stephens County
- Length: 0.924 mi (1,487 m)
- Existed: December 22, 1993–present

Farm to Market Road 1800 (FM 1800) is located in Stephens County. It runs from SH 67 northeast of Breckenridge westward to the Texas Department of Criminal Justice's Walker Sayle Unit.

The current FM 1800 was designated on December 22, 1993, on the current route.

=== FM 1800/RM 1800 (1951) ===
Ranch to Market Road 1800
- Location: Martin, Midland, Glasscock, and Reagan counties
- Existed: December 18, 1951–May 16, 1984

The previous route numbered FM 1800 was designated on December 18, 1951, from FM 307 in Midland County north to the Martin County line. On February 21, 1952, the road was extended 2.8 miles (4.5 km) north to US 80 (now I-20) at Stanton. On January 29, 1953, the road was extended south and southeast to SH 158 in Glasscock County, 4 miles (6.4 km) east of the Midland County line, replacing FM 1857. On December 1, 1953, the route was signed, but not designated, as SH 137. On October 31, 1957, the road was extended southeast 6.0 miles (9.7 km) from SH 158. A year later the road was extended southeast 11.0 miles (17.7 km) to the Reagan County line. On December 2, 1958, the road was extended southeast via Stiles to RM 33, 12.5 miles (20.1 km) north of Big Lake, replacing RM 2404; the designation was changed to Ranch to Market Road 1800 (RM 1800). RM 1800 was cancelled on May 16, 1984, when the SH 137 designation became official.

== FM 1801 ==
Farm to Market Road 1801
- Location: Wood County
- Length: 6.283 mi (10.112 km)
- Existed: November 20, 1951–present

Farm to Market Road 1801 (FM 1801), located in Wood County, terminates at Mineola on its western end and at Hoard on its eastern end and runs through New Hope between the two settlements.

== FM 1802 ==
Farm to Market Road 1802
- Location: Wheeler County
- Length: 0.984 mi (1,584 m)
- Existed: November 20, 1951–present

Farm to Market Road 1802 (FM 1802) is located in Wheeler County. Its northern terminus is at I-40 exit 169. It runs southward approximately 1 mile (1.6 km) before state maintenance ends. The unimproved roadway that continues from both ends is CR 23.

FM 1802 was designated on November 20, 1951, along the current route. The intersecting route at the northern terminus was previously US 66.

== FM 1803 ==
Farm to Market Road 1803
- Location: Henderson County
- Length: 8.335 mi (13.414 km)
- Existed: October 31, 1958–present

Farm to Market Road 1803 (FM 1803) is a 8.3-mile (13.4 km) route in Smith County. It runs from FM 317 west of Leagueville to FM 773 south of Mars.

=== FM 1803 (1951) ===
Farm to Market Road 1803
- Location: Smith County
- Existed: November 20, 1951–October 30, 1957

A previous route numbered FM 1803 was designated on November 20, 1951 for a road in Henderson County, from U.S. Route 271, 2 miles (3.2 km) north of Tyler, south to Texas State Highway 64. On December 10, 1954, the road was extended south, west, north and east to FM 1803 0.1 miles (0.16 km) south of the point of beginning, replacing Farm to Market Road 845 and completing the loop around Tyler. FM 1803 was cancelled on October 30, 1957, and transferred to Texas State Highway Loop 323.

== FM 1804 ==
Farm to Market Road 1804
- Location: Smith and Wood counties
- Length: 7.806 mi (12.563 km)
- Existed: November 20, 1951–present

== FM 1805 ==
Farm to Market Road 1805
- Location: Van Zandt and Smith counties
- Length: 5.241 mi (8.435 km)
- Existed: November 20, 1951–present

== FM 1806 ==
Farm to Market Road 1806
- Location: Montague County
- Length: 14.296 mi (23.007 km)
- Existed: December 17, 1952–present

Farm to Market Road 1806 (FM 1806) is a two-lane highway that connects the farming areas of west central Montague County to the county seat, Montague. FM 1806 also intersects with US 81 leading to Ringgold and Bowie, and other various county secondary roads. FM 1806 runs from a point 2.9 miles (4.7 km) west of US 81, near Stoneburg, to SH 59 and SH 175 in Montague.

The current FM 1806 was designated on December 17, 1952 (numbered February 6, 1953 or later), from US 81 in Stoneburg northeastward and eastward 4.0 miles (6.4 km). On November 21, 1956, FM 1806 was extended east 3.9 miles (6.3 km). On January 10, 1957, FM 1806 was extended east to SH 59/SH 175, replacing FM 2188. On September 27, 1977, FM 1806 was extended west to its current western terminus.

=== FM 1806 (1951) ===
Farm to Market Road 1806
- Location: Johnson County
- Existed: November 20, 1951–February 6, 1953

FM 1806 was originally designated on November 20, 1951, on a route from SH 171 to FM 110 (now FM 4) in Johnson County; this route was transferred to FM 916 on February 6, 1953.

== FM 1807 ==
Farm to Market Road 1807
- Location: Johnson and Ellis counties
- Length: 9.255 mi (14.894 km)
- Existed: 1951–present

== FM 1808 ==
Farm to Market Road 1808
- Location: Mitchell County
- Length: 8.400 mi (13.518 km)
- Existed: September 29, 1954–present

=== FM 1808 (1951) ===
Farm to Market Road 1808
- Location: Mitchell County
- Existed: November 20, 1951–February 24, 1953

A previous route numbered FM 1808 was designated on November 20, 1951, from US 80 (now I-20 Business) at Westbrook to a point 5.8 miles (9.3 km) south. On December 17, 1952, the road was extended 3.0 miles (4.8 km) to SH 101 (now SH 163). FM 1808 was cancelled on February 24, 1953, and transferred to FM 670.

== FM 1809 ==
Farm to Market Road 1809
- Location: Nolan County
- Length: 2.721 mi (4.379 km)
- Existed: 1951–present

Farm to Market Road 1809 (FM 1809) is located in Nolan County. It runs from SH 70, 5 miles (8.0 km) south of Sweetwater, westward approximately 2.7 miles (4.3 km) before state maintenance ends. The roadway continues as CR 145.

FM 1809 was designated on November 20, 1951, along the current route.

== FM 1810 ==
Farm to Market Road 1810
- Location: Jack and Wise counties
- Length: 27.724 mi (44.617 km)
- Existed: August 24, 1955–present

=== FM 1810 (1951) ===
Farm to Market Road 1810
- Location: Wilbarger County
- Existed: November 20, 1951–October 18, 1954

A previous route numbered FM 1810 was designated on November 20, 1951, from US 287, 3.5 miles (5.6 km) east of Vernon, northeast to Kingola. FM 1810 was cancelled on October 18, 1954, and became a portion of FM 1763.

== FM 1811 ==
Farm to Market Road 1811
- Location: Wilbarger and Wichita counties
- Length: 16.911 mi (27.216 km)
- Existed: 1951–present

== FM 1812 ==
Farm to Market Road 1812
- Location: Fisher and Jones counties
- Length: 25.415 mi (40.901 km)
- Existed: September 29, 1954–present

=== FM 1812 (1951) ===
Farm to Market Road 1812
- Location: Wichita County
- Existed: November 20, 1951–February 25, 1954

A previous route numbered FM 1812 was designated on November 20, 1951, from SH 25 southwest to US 287 in Electra. FM 1812 was cancelled on February 25, 1954, and transferred to SH 25 when it was rerouted. The old route on 5th street, Avenue C, Waggoner Street, Glisson Street, and Main Street was given to the city.

== FM 1813 ==
Farm to Market Road 1813
- Location: Wichita County
- Length: 1.898 mi (3.055 km)
- Existed: 1951–present

Farm to Market Road 1813 (FM 1813) is located in Wichita County. It runs from SH 240 near the community of Clara southward and eastward to FM 368.

FM 1813 was designated on November 20, 1951, along the current route. The route at the southern terminus was formerly designated FM 1205, which was renumbered FM 368 on July 28, 1953.

== FM 1814 ==
Farm to Market Road 1814
- Location: Wichita County
- Length: 2.173 mi (3.497 km)
- Existed: 1951–present

== FM 1815 ==
Farm to Market Road 1815
- Location: Montague County
- Length: 4.727 mi (7.607 km)
- Existed: November 20, 1951–present

Farm to Market Road 1815 (FM 1815) is located in north-central Montague County. The two-lane highway connects FM 1956 with US 82 near Bonita.

FM 1815 was designated on November 20, 1951, running from US 82 to a point 2.3 miles (3.7 km) to the north. It was extended north to its current terminus on November 21, 1956.

== FM 1816 ==
Farm to Market Road 1816
- Location: Montague County
- Length: 17.853 mi (28.732 km)
- Existed: November 20, 1951–present

Farm to Market Road 1816 (FM 1816) is a two-lane highway in Montague County. It runs from SH 59 in Bowie to an intersection 1.1 miles (1.8 km) north of US 82. FM 1816 also intersects with FM 1806 east of Stoneburg and other various county secondary roads. The road generally parallels US 81 through central Montague County.

FM 1816 was designated on November 20, 1951, from US 82 north 1.1 miles (1.8 km). On August 24, 1955, FM 1816 was extended south 5.0 miles (8.0 km). On November 21, 1956, FM 1816 was extended south to FM 1806. On February 2, 1959, FM 1816 was extended south to SH 59, replacing FM 1935.

== FM 1817 ==
Farm to Market Road 1817
- Location: Anderson County
- Length: 8.86 mi (14.26 km)
- Existed: 1951–present

== FM 1818 ==
Farm to Market Road 1818
- Location: Angelina County
- Length: 20.792 mi (33.461 km)
- Existed: 1951–present

== FM 1819 ==
Farm to Market Road 1819
- Location: Angelina and Cherokee counties
- Length: 7.122 mi (11.462 km)
- Existed: 1951–present

== FM 1820 ==
Farm to Market Road 1820 (FM 1820) is a designation that has been used twice. No highway currently uses the FM 1820 designation.

=== FM 1820 (1951) ===
Farm to Market Road 1820
- Location: Shelby County
- Existed: November 20, 1951–August 13, 1968

The first route numbered FM 1820 was designated in Shelby County on November 20, 1951, running from SH 87 at Shelbyville northeastward to Carroll Church at a distance of 6.4 miles (10.3 km). The highway was extended 5.4 miles (8.7 km) to FM 139 at Pauls Store on August 24, 1955. FM 1820 was cancelled and became a portion of FM 417 on August 13, 1968.

=== FM 1820 (1978) ===
Farm to Market Road 1820
- Location: Wise County
- Existed: April 25, 1978–November 19, 1996

The second route numbered FM 1820 was designated in Wise County on April 25, 1978, running near the Lake Bridgeport Dam southeastward to US 380 at a distance of 1.1 miles (1.8 km). The highway was extended 1.8 miles (2.9 km) northward to FM 1658 on July 29, 1993. FM 1820 was cancelled on November 19, 1996, with the mileage being transferred to FM 1658.

== FM 1821 ==
Farm to Market Road 1821
- Location: Palo Pinto County
- Length: 5.838 mi (9.395 km)
- Existed: January 29, 1959–present

Farm to Market Road 1821 (FM 1821) is located in Palo Pinto County.

FM 1821 begins at an intersection with FM 1195 near Mineral Wells Airport. The highway starts out running in a west direction along MH 379, then turns north onto Garrett Morris Parkway. FM 1821 travels through more rural areas of Mineral Wells before running near a subdivision and retail center near US 180. The highway leaves the Mineral Wells city limits just north of an intersection with FM 3027 and passes near a subdivision before the route becomes more rural. FM 1821 turns west at Hayes Road and continues to travel in a westward direction, ending at an intersection with US 281.

The current FM 1821 was designated on January 29, 1959, running from US 180 east of Mineral Wells southward and eastward to FM 1195 along a former routing of that highway. On September 27, 1960, the highway was extended northward to US 281 with an overlap with US 180. FM 1821 was routed off of US 180 on November 5, 1971.

Junction list

The entire route is in Palo Pinto County.

Location	mi	km	Destinations	Notes
Mineral Wells	0.0	0.0	FM 1195 – Mineral Wells Airport	
Mineral Wells	2.3	3.7	US 180 – Mineral Wells, Weatherford	
Mineral Wells	3.3	5.3	FM 3027 west (NE 23rd Street)	
	5.9	9.5	US 281 – Mineral Wells, Jacksboro	
1.000 mi = 1.609 km; 1.000 km = 0.621 mi

=== FM 1821 (1951) ===
Farm to Market Road 1821
- Location: Shelby County
- Existed: November 20, 1951–November 28, 1958

A previous route numbered FM 1821 was designated on November 20, 1951, running from SH 7 near Center southward to Jericho at a distance of 3.7 miles (6.0 km). The highway was cancelled on November 28, 1958, with the mileage being transferred to FM 711.

== FM 1822 ==
Farm to Market Road 1822
- Location: Jackson County
- Length: 7.598 mi (12.228 km)
- Existed: 1951–present

== FM 1823 ==
Farm to Market Road 1823
- Location: Jackson County
- Length: 6.93 mi (11.15 km)
- Existed: 1951–present

== FM 1824 ==
Farm to Market Road 1824
- Location: Erath County
- Length: 4.518 mi (7.271 km)
- Existed: December 17, 1952–present

=== FM 1824 (1951) ===
Farm to Market Road 1824
- Location: Blanco County
- Existed: November 20, 1951–January 29, 1953

A previous route numbered FM 1824 was designated on November 20, 1951, running from US 281 near Johnson City northwest 4.5 miles (7.2 km) toward Sandy. FM 1824 was cancelled on January 29, 1953 and became a portion of FM 1323.

== FM 1825 ==
Farm to Market Road 1825
- Location: Travis County
- Length: 3.913 mi (6.297 km)
- Existed: November 20, 1951–present

Farm to Market Road 1825 (FM 1825) is a 4-mile (6.437 km) route in Travis County. FM 1825 begins in far north Austin at I-35 exit 247. It proceeds north and then east 3.9 miles (6.3 km) into Pflugerville, within which it is named Pecan Street. FM 1825 ends in Pflugerville at an intersection with FM 685. FM 1825 also includes a short 0.8-mile (1.3 km) unsigned spur along Vision Drive that acts as a bypass for the north–south section running parallel to I-35.

As designated on November 20, 1951, FM 1825 originally included only the segment from Three Points Road eastward, which intersected with US 81 at the time. On January 18, 1960, the alignment of US 81 was altered to align with I-35; FM 1825 was extended south 1.1 miles (1.8 km) to intersect with the new I-35 alignment, and Three Points Road between FM 1825 and I-35 was added as an unsigned spur. On June 27, 1995, FM 1825 was redesignated as Urban Road 1825 (UR 1825). The designation reverted to FM 1825 with the elimination of the Urban Road system on November 15, 2018.

== RM 1826 ==
Ranch to Market Road 1826
- Location: Hays and Travis counties
- Length: 12.088 mi (19.454 km)
- Existed: November 20, 1951–present

Ranch to Market Road 1826 (RM 1826) is a 12-mile (19 km) east–west route located in Travis and Hays counties.

RM 1826 begins at an intersection with RM 150 just north of Driftwood. The route proceeds northeast 8.4 miles (13.5 km), entering Travis County to intersect the stub end of the southern segment of SH 45. It continues northeast 3.7 miles (6.0 km) along the Austin city limits to its northern terminus, along US 290 west of its intersection with SH 71 in the Oak Hill neighborhood of Austin.

RM 1826 was designated on November 20, 1951, as Farm to Market Road 1826 (FM 1826), from US 290 southwestward to the Hays County line. On September 29, 1954, the route was extended west 7.9 miles (12.7 km) to FM 966 (now RM 150) near Driftwood, and the designation was changed to RM 150.

Junction list

County	Location	mi	km	Destinations	Notes
Hays		0.0	0.0	RM 150 – Driftwood	Southern terminus
Hays		1.3	2.1	RM 967 – Buda	
Travis	Austin	8.5	13.7	SH 45 to Loop 1	
Travis	Austin	12.1	19.5	US 290 to SH 71 – Austin, Johnson City	Northern terminus
1.000 mi = 1.609 km; 1.000 km = 0.621 mi

== FM 1827 ==
Farm to Market Road 1827
- Location: Collin County
- Length: 10.784 mi (17.355 km)
- Existed: 1951–present

Farm to Market Road 1827 (FM 1827), also known as New Hope Road, is located north of U.S Hwy 380 in Collin County. The North end of FM 1827 is an intersection with FM 545, while the southern end is at U.S Hwy 380, between the cities of McKinney and Princeton.

== FM 1828 ==
Farm to Market Road 1828
- Location: Schleicher County
- Length: 16.099 mi (25.909 km)
- Existed: October 31, 1957–present

=== FM 1828 (1951) ===
Farm to Market Road 1828
- Location: Collin County
- Existed: November 20, 1951–May 20, 1955

The first use of the FM 1828 designation was on November 20, 1951, in Collin County, from SH 24 west of McKinney north 3.0 miles (4.8 km) to a road intersection. FM 1828 was cancelled on May 20, 1955, and became a portion of FM 1461.

=== FM 1828 (1955) ===
Farm to Market Road 1828
- Location: San Jacinto County
- Existed: August 24, 1955–December 17, 1956

The next use of the FM 1828 designation was on August 24, 1955, in San Jacinto County, from SH 150, 2 miles (3.2 km) south of Coldspring, south 5.5 miles (8.9 km) to a road intersection. FM 1828 was cancelled on December 17, 1956, and became a portion of FM 2025.

== FM 1829 ==
Farm to Market Road 1829
- Location: Coryell County
- Length: 7.129 mi (11.473 km)
- Existed: December 17, 1952–present

=== FM 1829 (1951) ===
Farm to Market Road 1829
- Location: Denton County
- Existed: November 20, 1951–January 29, 1953

A previous route numbered FM 1829 was designated on November 20, 1951, from SH 10 in Pilot Point west 5.8 miles (9.3 km) to a road intersection. FM 1829 was cancelled on January 29, 1953, and transferred to FM 455.

== FM 1830 ==
Farm to Market Road 1830
- Location: Denton County
- Length: 5.477 mi (8.814 km)
- Existed: 1951–present

Farm to Market Road 1830 (FM 1830) is located in Denton County.

FM 1830 begins at an intersection with FM 407 in Argyle. The highway travels in a northern direction along the eastern edge of the town, leaving the city limits at an intersection with Hickory Hill Road. FM 1830 travels through areas that feature a mix between subdivisions and farm land, entering Denton near Ryan Road. The highway travels through less developed areas of the city, ending at an intersection with US 377.

FM 1830 was designated on November 20, 1951, traveling from US 377 southward to a road intersection at a distance of 6.2 miles (10.0 km). The highway was extended 2.0 miles (3.2 km) southward to FM 1078 at Bartonville on December 17, 1952. The section of FM 1830 between FM 1172 and FM 1078 was cancelled and transferred to FM 407 (along with all of FM 1172 and FM 1078) on January 6, 1955, decreasing the route's length by 2.6 miles (4.2 km). The route was redesignated Urban Road 1830 (UR 1830) on June 27, 1995. The designation reverted to FM 1830 with the elimination of the Urban Road system on November 15, 2018.

== FM 1831 ==
Farm to Market Road 1831
- Location: Crosby County
- Length: 7.554 mi (12.157 km)
- Existed: 1951–present

== RM 1832 ==
Ranch to Market Road 1832
- Location: Jeff Davis County
- Length: 10.859 mi (17.476 km)
- Existed: March 26, 1953–present

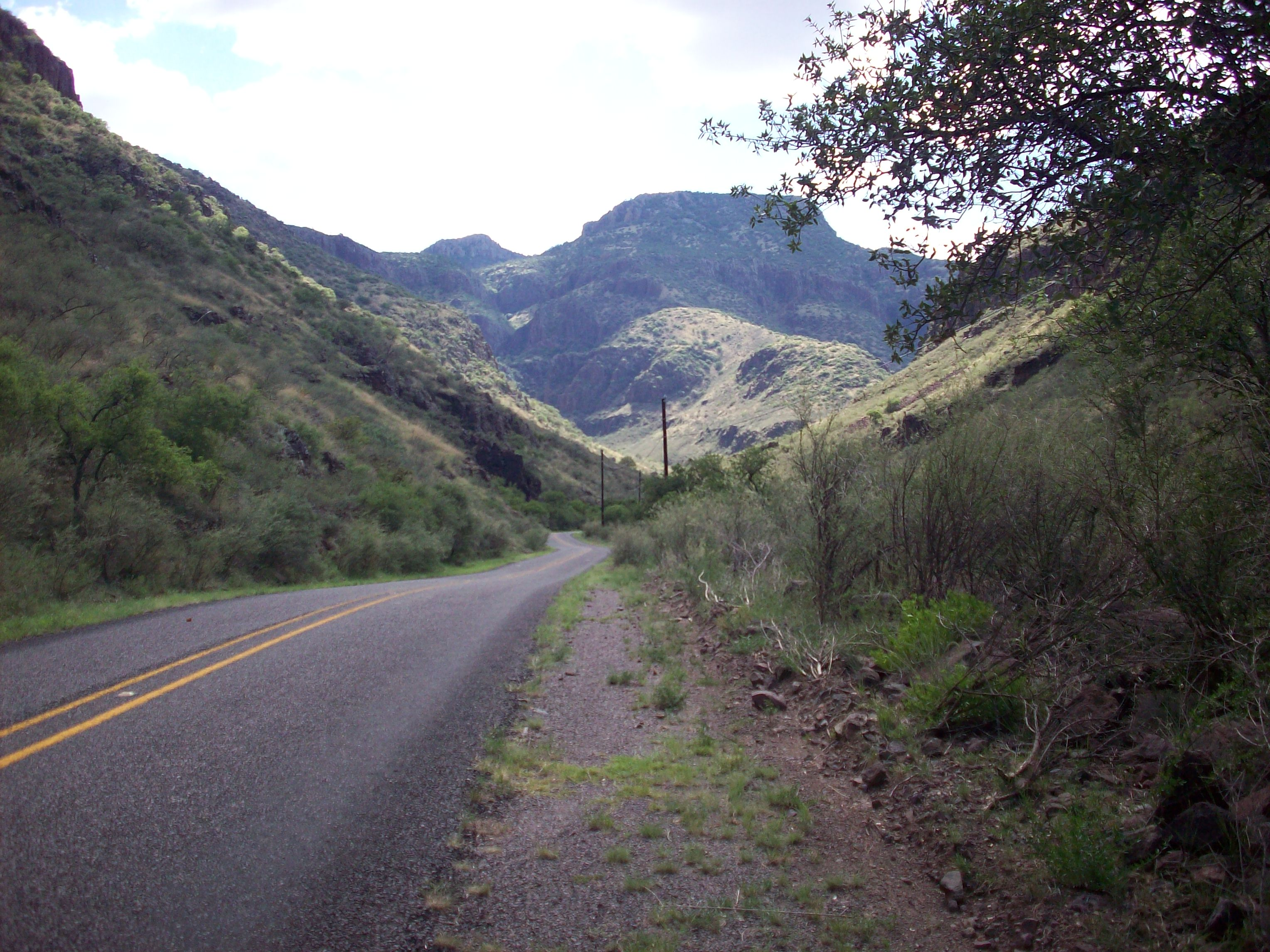
RM 1832 in the Davis Mountains of northeastern Jeff Davis County

Ranch to Market Road 1832 (RM 1832) is located in Jeff Davis County. The 10.9-mile-long (17.5 km) route connects the Boy Scouts of America's Buffalo Trails Scout Ranch to SH 17, about 25.1 miles (40.4 km) north of Fort Davis.

On March 26, 1953, Farm to Market Road 1832 (FM 1832) was designated along the present route. The route was to be cancelled and given to Jeff Davis County upon the completion of construction, which occurred by September 20, 1954. On September 20, 1955, the designation was restored. The road was redesignated RM 1832 on October 27, 1959.

=== FM 1832 (1951) ===
Farm to Market Road 1832
- Location: Callahan County
- Existed: November 20, 1951–January 28, 1953

A previous route numbered FM 1832 was designated in Callahan County on November 20, 1951, as a 6.0-mile (9.7 km) road linking the former US 80 (now I-20) 1.0 mile (1.6 km) east of Putnam to a road intersection. On December 17, 1952, FM 1832 was extended to US 380 near Moran. FM 1832 was cancelled on January 28, 1953, and became an extension of FM 880.

== FM 1833 ==
Farm to Market Road 1833
- Location: Nueces County
- Length: 7.717 mi (12.419 km)
- Existed: October 28, 1953–present

=== FM 1833 (1951) ===
Farm to Market Road 1833
- Location: Fisher County
- Existed: November 20, 1951–November 4, 1953

A previous route numbered FM 1833 was designated on November 20, 1951, from FM 57 at Sylvester to a point 8.6 miles (13.8 km) southeast. FM 1833 was cancelled on November 4, 1953, and transferred to FM 1085.

== FM 1834 ==
Farm to Market Road 1834
- Location: Willacy County
- Length: 2.045 mi (3.291 km)
- Existed: June 28, 1963–present

=== FM 1834 (1951) ===
Farm to Market Road 1834
- Location: Haskell County
- Existed: December 11, 1951–October 22, 1962

A previous route numbered FM 1834 was designated on December 11, 1951, from FM 618 to a point 0.8 miles (1.3 km) west as a replacement of a section of FM 618. On November 21, 1956, the road was extended 9.1 miles (14.6 km) northwest to Haskell. FM 1834 was cancelled on October 22, 1962, and transferred to FM 600.

== FM 1835 ==
Farm to Market Road 1835
- Location: Stonewall and Jones counties
- Length: 36.047 mi (58.012 km)
- Existed: 1951–present

== FM 1836 ==
Farm to Market Road 1836
- Location: Kaufman County
- Length: 15.708 mi (25.280 km)
- Existed: 1951–present

== RM 1837 ==
Ranch to Market Road 1837
- Location: Jeff Davis County
- Length: 3.383 mi (5.444 km)
- Existed: March 26, 1953–present

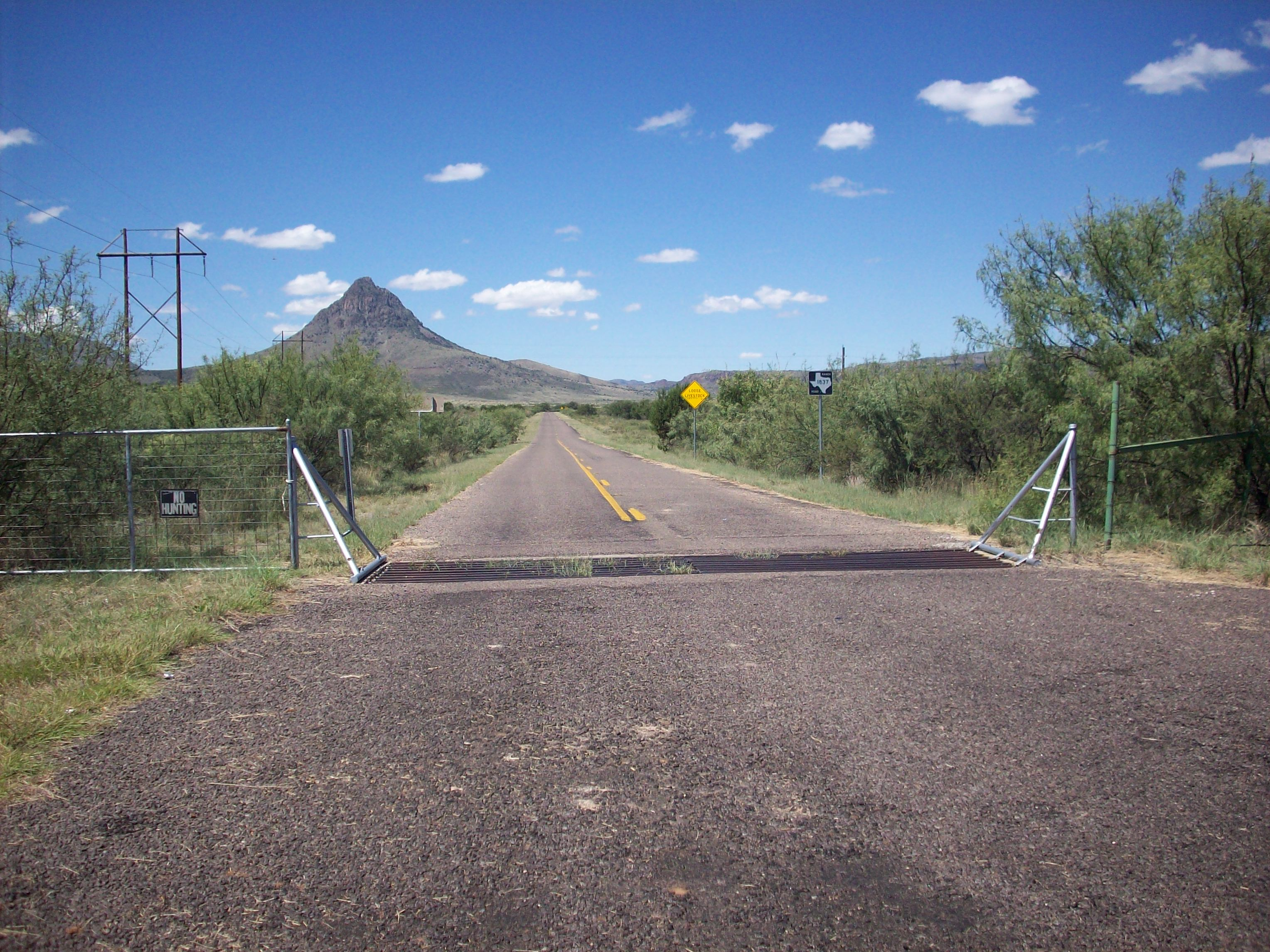
Eastern terminus of RM 1837 at SH 118 in southeastern Jeff Davis County. Mountain in background is Mitre Peak

Ranch to Market Road 1837 (RM 1837) is located in Jeff Davis County. It connects the Girl Scouts of the USA's Camp Mitre Peak to SH 118 14.2 miles (22.9 km) south of Fort Davis.

RM 1837 was designated on March 26, 1953, and was to be cancelled and relinquished to the county upon completion, which occurred on September 20, 1954. On September 20, 1955, the route was restored as part of the state highway system as Farm to Market Road 1837 (FM 1837). The designation was again changed to RM 1837 on October 1, 1959.

=== FM 1837 (1951) ===
Farm to Market Road 1837
- Location: Kaufman County
- Existed: November 20, 1951–January 29, 1953

A previous route numbered FM 1837 was designated in Kaufman County on November 20, 1951, from US 80, 1.0 mile (1.6 km) east of Terrell, southeastward 4.8 miles (7.7 km). FM 1837 was cancelled on January 29, 1953, and became part of an extended FM 429.

== FM 1838 ==
Farm to Market Road 1838
- Location: Navarro County
- Length: 9.353 mi (15.052 km)
- Existed: 1951–present

== FM 1839 ==
Farm to Market Road 1839
- Location: Navarro County
- Length: 5.813 mi (9.355 km)
- Existed: 1951–present

== FM 1840 ==
Farm to Market Road 1840
- Location: Bowie County
- Length: 13.818 mi (22.238 km)
- Existed: November 20, 1951–present

Farm to Market Road 1840 is a 13.818-mile (22.238 km) state road in Bowie County that connects US 82 in De Kalb with SH 8 in New Boston.

== FM 1841 ==
Farm to Market Road 1841
- Location: Cass County
- Length: 22.247 mi (35.803 km)
- Existed: 1951–present

== FM 1842 ==
Farm to Market Road 1842
- Location: Lamb County
- Length: 11.408 mi (18.359 km)
- Existed: 1951–present

== FM 1843 ==
Farm to Market Road 1843
- Location: Lamb County
- Length: 5.785 mi (9.310 km)
- Existed: November 20, 1951–present

Farm to Market Road 1843 (FM 1843) is located in Lamb County. It runs from US 84 in Sudan east to FM 1055 north of Amherst.

FM 1843 was designated on November 20, 1951, along its current route.

== FM 1844 ==
Farm to Market Road 1844
- Location: Upshur and Gregg counties
- Length: 11.196 mi (18.018 km)
- Existed: November 20, 1951–present

Farm to Market Road 1844 (FM 1844) is located in Upshur and Gregg counties. It runs from US 271 in Union Grove east to US 259 near Judson. FM 1844 was designated on November 20, 1951, from US 271 in Union Grove to FM 1403 (now SH 300). On December 16 of that year, FM 1844 was extended to SH 26 (now US 259) at Judson. On November 5, 1971, it was extended from old US 259 to new US 259.

Junction list

County	Location	mi	km	Destinations	Notes
Upshur	Union Grove			US 271 – Gilmer, Gladewater	
Upshur	East Mountain			FM 1845 (Main Street)	
Upshur	East Mountain			SH 300 (Gilmer Road) – Gilmer, Longview	
Gregg	Judson			Spur 502 (Judson Road) – Longview	
Gregg				FM 2751 north	
Gregg				US 259 – Ore City, Longview	
1.000 mi = 1.609 km; 1.000 km = 0.621 mi

== FM 1845 ==
Farm to Market Road 1845
- Location: Upshur and Gregg counties
- Length: 9.702 mi (15.614 km)
- Existed: November 20, 1951–present

Farm to Market Road 1845 (FM 1845) is Upshur and Gregg counties. It runs from US 80 in Longview northwest to FM 726 near East Mountain. It is known as Pine Tree Road in Longview.

FM 1845 was designated on November 20, 1951, from FM 1844 south to the Gregg County line. On September 25, 1952, it was extended south to SH 26 (later US 259; this section now part of SH 31). On July 28, 1953, FM 1845 was extended to SH 149, replacing FM 1919 on that route. On November 3, 1969, it was extended south over the old location of SH 149 to Interstate Highway 20 (I-20). On October 26, 1983, it was extended northwest 0.6 miles (0.97 km) to East Mountain. On February 26, 1986, FM 1845 was extended northwest to FM 726. On March 25, 1992, the section from US 80 to I-20 was transferred to Loop 281. On June 27, 1995, the section from FM 2275 to US 80 was redesignated Urban Road 1845 (UR 1845). The designation of this section reverted to FM 1845 with the elimination of the Urban Road system on November 15, 2018.

Junction list

County	Location	mi	km	Destinations	Notes
Gregg	Longview			US 80 (Marshall Avenue) – White Oak, Hallsville	
Gregg	Longview			Loop 281	
Gregg	Longview			FM 2605 west (Teneryville Road)	
Gregg	Longview			FM 2275 (George Richey Road)	
Upshur	East Mountain			FM 1844	
Upshur				FM 726	
1.000 mi = 1.609 km; 1.000 km = 0.621 mi

== FM 1846 ==
Farm to Market Road 1846
- Location: Cameron County
- Length: 7.483 mi (12.043 km)
- Existed: 1951–present

== FM 1847 ==
Farm to Market Road 1847
- Location: Cameron County
- Length: 27.764 mi (44.682 km)
- Existed: November 20, 1951–present

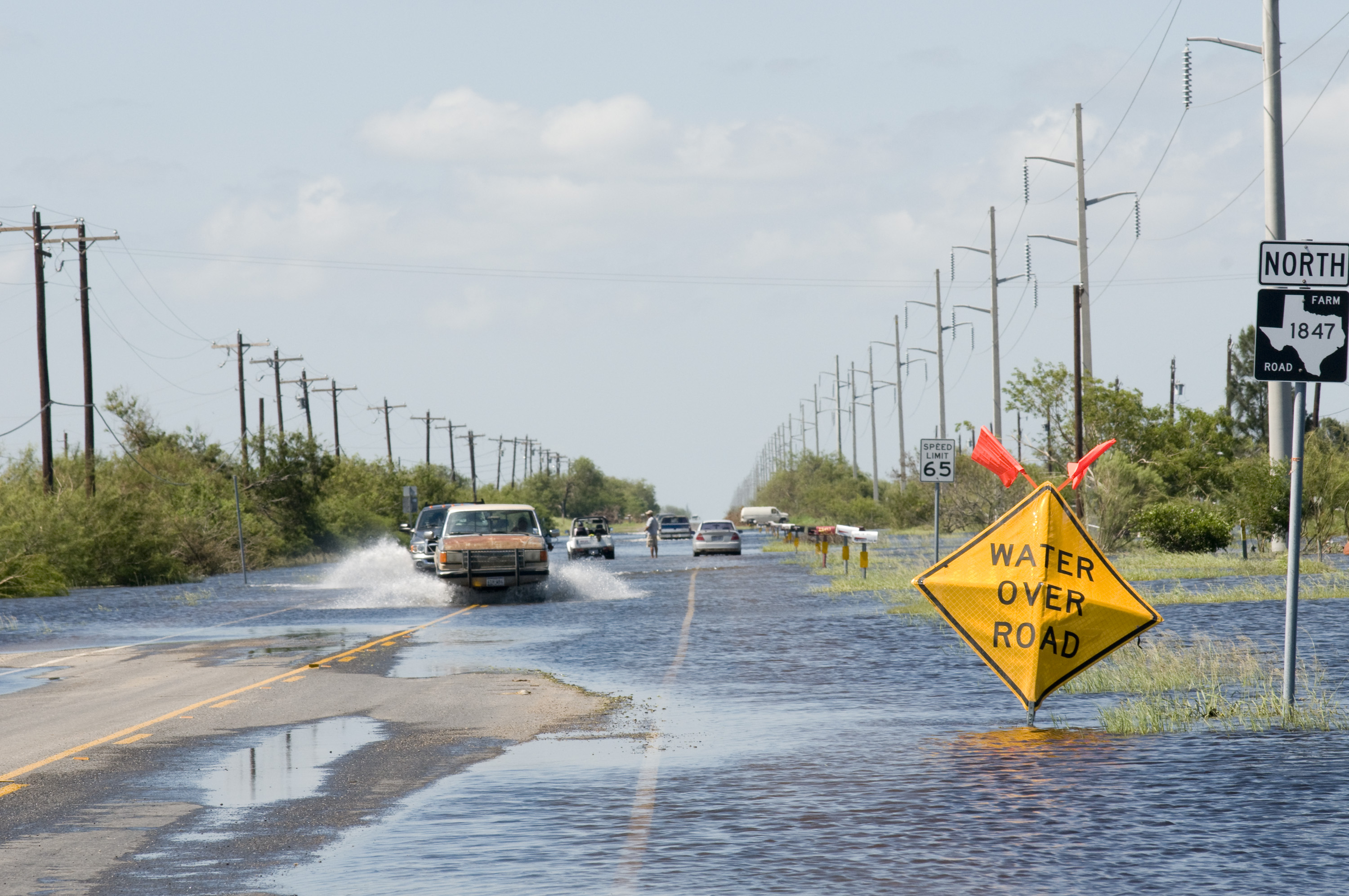
FM 1847 flooded following Hurricane Dolly in July 2008

Farm to Market Road 1847 (FM 1847) is located in Cameron County. FM 1847 was originally designated on November 20, 1951, from a road intersection southward 4.1 miles (6.6 km) to SH 100 in Los Fresnos, Texas. On December 17, 1952, it was extended 10.7 miles (17.2 km) south to SH 48, and the north end became part of FM 732 (which had its east end there). On October 26, 1954, this section of FM 732 became part of FM 510 which had extended west. On June 28, 1963, it was extended another 5.6 miles (9.0 km) northward to FM 2358, with another extension northward to Arroyo Colorado on November 10, 1967, replacing part of FM 2358, which was canceled as the remainder west to FM 803 became part of FM 106 as several farm to market roads in the area were changed. The road at the north end would become part of FM 2925 (which ended there) on November 3, 1972. FM 2925 was extended east from FM 1847 on May 7, 1974, so the roads were no longer end to end. The portion south of FM 3248 was transferred to Urban Road 1847 (UR 1847) on June 27, 1995. The designation of this section reverted to FM 1847 with the elimination of the Urban Road system on November 15, 2018.

== FM 1848 ==
Farm to Market Road 1848
- Location: Freestone and Leon counties
- Length: 9.646 mi (15.524 km)
- Existed: May 6, 1964–present

=== FM 1848 (1951) ===
Farm to Market Road 1848
- Location: Cottle County
- Existed: November 20, 1951–September 14, 1963

A previous route numbered FM 1848 was designated on November 20, 1951, from FM 1038 south to Sneedville. FM 1848 was cancelled on September 14, 1963, and transferred to FM 1168.

== FM 1849 ==
Farm to Market Road 1849
- Location: Brown County
- Length: 4.113 mi (6.619 km)
- Existed: 1951–present

== FM 1850 ==
Farm to Market Road 1850
- Location: Brown County
- Length: 2.901 mi (4.669 km)
- Existed: 1951–present

== FM 1851 ==
Farm to Market Road 1851
- Location: McCulloch and Mason counties
- Length: 7.524 mi (12.109 km)
- Existed: 1951–present

== FM 1852 ==
Farm to Market Road 1852
- Location: Stephens and Eastland counties
- Length: 14.79 mi (23.80 km)
- Existed: 1951–present

== FM 1853 ==
Farm to Market Road 1853
- Location: Stephens and Eastland counties
- Length: 13.056 mi (21.012 km)
- Existed: 1951–present

== FM 1854 ==
Farm to Market Road 1854
- Location: Caldwell County
- Length: 13.74 mi (22.11 km)
- Existed: 1951–present

== RM 1855 ==
Ranch to Market Road 1855
- Location: Burnet County
- Length: 1.614 mi (2.597 km)
- Existed: November 20, 1951 (Note: RM 1855 was previously designated as FM 1855 from 1951 to 1956.)–present

== FM 1856 ==
Farm to Market Road 1856
- Location: Nolan County
- Length: 10.008 mi (16.106 km)
- Existed: 1951–present

== FM 1857 ==
Farm to Market Road 1857
- Location: Cherokee County
- Length: 10.326 mi (16.618 km)
- Existed: December 17, 1952–present

=== FM 1857 (1951) ===
Farm to Market Road 1857
- Location: Howard County
- Existed: November 20, 1951–by January 18, 1952

The first use of the FM 1857 designation was in Howard County, from US 87 northwest of Big Spring northeast to FM 1584 at Vealmoor. FM 1857 was cancelled by January 18, 1952, and transferred to FM 669.

=== FM 1857 (1952) ===
Farm to Market Road 1857
- Location: Glasscock County
- Existed: January 18, 1952–January 23, 1953

The next use of the FM 1857 designation was in Glasscock County, from SH 158, 4 miles (6.4 km) east of the Midland County line, northwest 7.0 miles (11.3 km) to a road intersection. On August 20, 1952, the road was extended northwest to FM 307. FM 1857 was cancelled on January 23, 1953 and transferred to FM 1800 (now SH 137).

== FM 1858 ==
Farm to Market Road 1858
- Location: McLennan County
- Length: 10.881 mi (17.511 km)
- Existed: October 31, 1958–present

=== FM 1858 (1951) ===
Farm to Market Road 1858
- Location: Austin County
- Existed: November 20, 1951–April 24, 1953

A previous route numbered FM 1858 was designated on November 20, 1951, from SH 159, 3 miles (4.8 km) east of Nelsonville, southwest 5.0 miles (8.0 km) to a road intersection. On December 17, 1952, the road was extended southwest 2.6 miles (4.2 km) to FM 1094. FM 1858 was cancelled on April 24, 1953; the original section was eliminated from the highway system in exchange for extending FM 1371 from the Washington–Austin county line to FM 1456; the remainder was eliminated from the highway system in exchange for extending FM 332 from FM 109 in Welcome to the end of FM 1263 at the Washington–Austin county line and the creation of FM 1952 (which then had its south end at the Austin–Fort Bend county line).

== FM 1859 ==
Farm to Market Road 1859
- Location: Bosque County
- Length: 0.291 mi (468 m)
- Existed: 1951–present

== FM 1860 ==
Farm to Market Road 1860
- Location: McLennan County
- Length: 17.587 mi (28.304 km)
- Existed: 1951–present

== FM 1861 ==
Farm to Market Road 1861
- Location: Van Zandt and Henderson counties
- Length: 14.537 mi (23.395 km)
- Existed: 1951–present

== FM 1862 ==
Farm to Market Road 1862
- Location: Jackson and Matagorda counties
- Length: 12.055 mi (19.401 km)
- Existed: 1951–present

== FM 1863 ==
Farm to Market Road 1863
- Location: Comal and Bexar counties
- Length: 17.097 mi (27.515 km)
- Existed: December 17, 1952–present

Farm to Market Road 1863 (FM 1863) is a 17-mile (27 km) route located primarily in Comal County. FM 1863 begins in Bulverde, at an interchange with US 281, and travels east through the southern portion of the city. Due to the manner in which the route was constructed, the route briefly enters Bexar County before returning to Comal County. It intersects FM 3009 near the Bulverde city limits. It continues eastward, eventually entering New Braunfels and ending at a junction with SH 46.

The current designation for FM 1863 was introduced on December 17, 1952 (numbered January 23, 1953 or later); at that time, the route's western terminus was listed as a "road intersection" 5 miles (8.0 km) west of SH 46. The designation was extended to the west 4.4 miles (7.1 km) on October 13, 1954. On November 21, 1956, the route was extended northwest 5 miles (8.0 km), and then extended westward to US 281 on October 31, 1957.

=== FM 1863 (1951) ===
Farm to Market Road 1863
- Location: Nacogdoches County
- Existed: November 20, 1951–January 23, 1953

A previous route numbered FM 1863 was designated on November 20, 1951, from SH 21 near Chireno north 6.3 miles (10.1 km) via Attoyac to a road intersection. FM 1863 was cancelled on January 23, 1953, and transferred to FM 1274 (which became part of FM 95 in 1964; FM 1274 was reused on a different route elsewhere in the state).

== FM 1864 ==
Farm to Market Road 1864
- Location: Callahan and Eastland counties
- Length: 9.875 mi (15.892 km)
- Existed: 1951–present

== RM 1865 ==
Ranch to Market Road 1865
- Location: Terrell and Val Verde counties
- Length: 2.815 mi (4.530 km)
- Existed: November 20, 1951 (Note: RM 1865 was previously designated as FM 1865 from 1951 to 1956.)–present

Ranch to Market Road 1865 (RM 1865) is located in Terrell and Val Verde counties. Its southern terminus is at US 90 in Terrell County, just east of the Val Verde County line. The route enters Val Verde County and travels to the northeast before ending at the Union Pacific Railroad line in Pumpville.

The route was designated as Farm to Market Road 1865 (FM 1865) on November 21, 1951, along the current route. On October 17, 1959, the designation was changed to RM 1865.

== FM 1866 ==
Farm to Market Road 1866
- Location: Zavala County
- Length: 7.28 mi (11.72 km)
- Existed: 1951–present

== FM 1867 ==
Farm to Market Road 1867
- Location: Zavala and Dimmit counties
- Length: 21.149 mi (34.036 km)
- Existed: 1951–present

== FM 1868 ==
Farm to Market Road 1868
- Location: Dickens County
- Length: 10.05 mi (16.17 km)
- Existed: 1951–present

== RM 1869 ==
Ranch to Market Road 1869
- Location: Burnet and Williamson counties
- Length: 12.732 mi (20.490 km)
- Existed: November 20, 1951 (Note: RM 1869 was previously designated as FM 1869 from 1951 to 1956.)–present

Ranch to Market Road 1869 (RM 1869) is located in Burnet and Williamson counties. It begins in Burnet County at an intersection with RM 1174 south of Bertram, within the Balcones Canyonlands National Wildlife Refuge. The route travels east into Williamson County, crossing SH 29 in Liberty Hill, before turning to the northeast and ending at a junction with US 183.

RM 1869 was designated on November 20, 1951, as Farm to Market Road 1869 (FM 1869), from SH 29 at Liberty Hill northeast 3.4 miles (5.5 km) to SH 74 (now US 183). The designation was changed to RM 1869 on October 1, 1956. On November 21, 1956, the road was extended west 9.0 miles (14.5 km) to what is now RM 1174.

Junction list

County	Location	mi	km	Destinations	Notes
Burnet		0.0	0.0	RM 1174 – Bertram	Western terminus
Williamson	Liberty Hill	9.4	15.1	Loop 332 (Main Street)	
Williamson	Liberty Hill	10.1	16.3	SH 29 – Burnet, Georgetown	
Williamson		12.7	20.4	US 183 – Austin, Lampasas	Eastern terminus
1.000 mi = 1.609 km; 1.000 km = 0.621 mi

== FM 1870 ==
Farm to Market Road 1870
- Location: Hopkins County
- Length: 6.414 mi (10.322 km)
- Existed: December 18, 1953–present

=== FM 1870 (1951) ===
Farm to Market Road 1870
- Location: Bastrop County
- Existed: November 20, 1951–November 13, 1953

A previous route numbered FM 1870 was designated on November 20, 1951, from SH 71, 1.3 miles (2.1 km) north of Smithville, towards Winchester to a point 6.8 miles (10.9 km). FM 1870 was cancelled on November 13, 1953, and transferred to FM 153.

== RM 1871 ==
Ranch to Market Road 1871
- Location: Mason and Kimble counties
- Length: 27.087 mi (43.592 km)
- Existed: November 20, 1951 (Note: RM 1871 was previously designated as FM 1871 from 1951 to 1956.)–present

This was originally FM 1871.

== FM 1872 ==
Farm to Market Road 1872
- Location: Polk County
- Length: 0.783 mi (1,260 m)
- Existed: 1951–present

== FM 1873 ==
Farm to Market Road 1873
- Location: Live Oak County
- Length: 11.444 mi (18.417 km)
- Existed: 1951–present

== FM 1874 ==
Farm to Market Road 1874
- Location: Runnels County
- Length: 2.009 mi (3.233 km)
- Existed: October 31, 1958–present

=== FM 1874 (1951) ===
Farm to Market Road 1874
- Location: Baylor County
- Existed: November 20, 1951–October 18, 1954

A previous route numbered FM 1874 was designated on November 20, 1951, from FM 422, 1 mile (1.6 km) west of England, south to SH 199 (now SH 114). FM 1874 was cancelled on October 18, 1954, and became a portion of FM 1790.

== FM 1875 ==
Farm to Market Road 1875
- Location: Fort Bend County
- Length: 4.596 mi (7.397 km)
- Existed: November 20, 1951–present

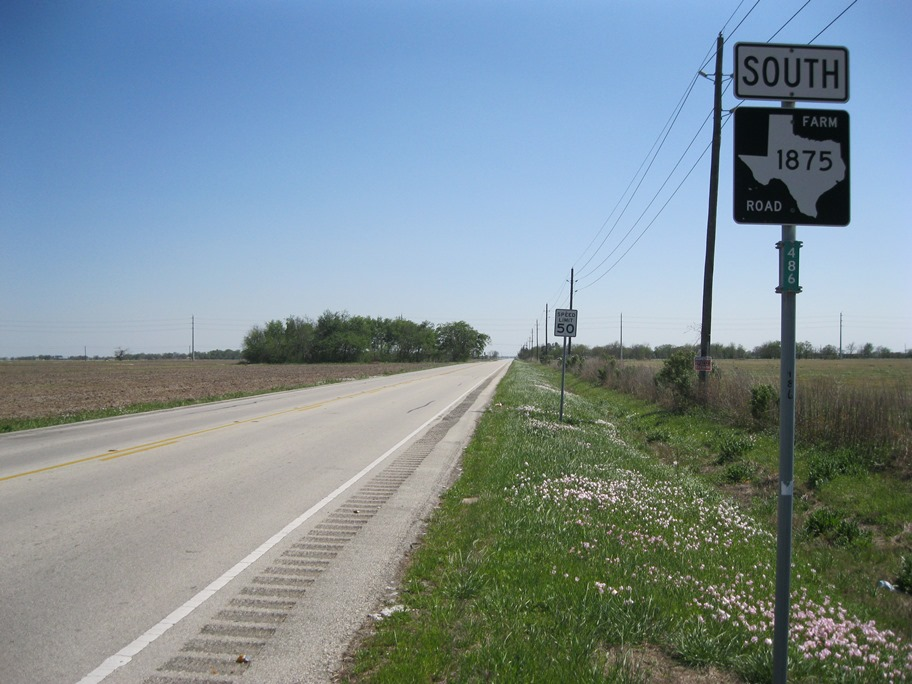
View south on FM 1875 near US 90 Alt. east of Tavener

Farm to Market Road 1875 (FM 1875) is located in Fort Bend County. The two-lane highway begins at Loop 540 southwest of Beasley and heads generally northwest to US 90 Alt. at a location east of Tavener.

FM 1875 begins at a stop sign on Loop 540 southwest of Beasley. The highway immediately crosses the Union Pacific Railroad tracks and heads straight to the northwest for about 2.75 miles (4.43 km). In this stretch, the road passes Ward Airpark on the right at Kovar Road. At Drachenberg Road, FM 1875 curves briefly to the northeast for 0.25 miles (0.40 km) before swinging back to the northwest again. After heading northwest for 0.65 miles (1.05 km), the highway turns and goes north by northwest for the final 1.0 mile (1.6 km) before ending at a stop sign at US 90 Alt. North of Drachenberg Road, FM 1875 is also known as Beasley Road.

FM 1875 was first designated on November 20, 1951, to run about 4.8 miles (7.7 km) from US 90 Alt. near Tavener to US 59 near Beasley. On April 14, 1980, a 3.1-mile (5.0 km) section of US 59 near Beasley became Loop 540.

== FM 1876 ==
Farm to Market Road 1876
- Location: Harris and Fort Bend counties
- Length: 5.594 mi (9.003 km)
- Existed: 1951–present

Farm to Market Road 1876 (FM 1876) is located in Harris and Fort Bend counties. It runs from Bellaire Boulevard in Houston south along Synott Road and Eldridge Road to US 90 Alt. in Sugar Land.

FM 1876 was designated on November 20, 1951, from US 59 (now US 90 Alt.) near Sugar Land northward 3.4 miles (5.5 km) to the Harris County line. On October 31, 1958, the road was extended 6.4 miles (10.3 km) north to FM 1093. On November 24, 1959, the road was relocated in Harris County, shortening its length by 2 miles (3.2 km). On September 25, 1962, the section in Harris County was cancelled, restoring its 1951 configuration. On May 25, 1976, the road was extended north 2.2 miles (3.5 km) into Harris County to the intersection of Synott Road and Bellaire Boulevard. The entire route was redesignated Urban Road 1876 (UR 1876) on June 27, 1995. The designation reverted to FM 1876 with the elimination of the Urban Road system on November 15, 2018.

== FM 1877 ==
Farm to Market Road 1877
- Location: Angelina County
- Length: 1.116 mi (1.796 km)
- Existed: 1951–present

== FM 1878 ==
Farm to Market Road 1878
- Location: Nacogdoches County
- Length: 14.764 mi (23.760 km)
- Existed: December 18, 1951–present

Farm to Market Road 1878 is a 14.4-mile (23.2 km) route in Nacogdoches County that connects Bus. US 59 in Nacogdoches with FM 95 north-northwest of Martinsville.

== FM 1879 ==
Farm to Market Road 1879
- Location: Dallam County
- Length: 12.799 mi (20.598 km)
- Existed: 1951–present

== FM 1880 ==
Farm to Market Road 1880
- Location: Delta County
- Length: 1.232 mi (1.983 km)
- Existed: 1951–present

== FM 1881 ==
Farm to Market Road 1881
- Location: Swisher County
- Length: 13.408 mi (21.578 km)
- Existed: April 24, 1953–present

=== FM 1881 (1951) ===
Farm to Market Road 1881
- Location: Wise County
- Existed: November 20, 1951–February 6, 1953

A previous route numbered FM 1881 was designated on November 20, 1951, from SH 24 (later SH 114, now SH 101) at Chico east 4.0 miles (6.4 km) to a road intersection. On December 17, 1952, the road was extended north 6.5 miles (10.5 km) to US 81 at Alvord. FM 1881 was cancelled on February 6, 1953, and transferred to FM 1655.

== FM 1882 ==
Farm to Market Road 1882
- Location: Ector County
- Length: 12.156 mi (19.563 km)
- Existed: October 28, 1953–present

=== FM 1882 (1951–1953) ===
Farm to Market Road 1882
- Location: Wise County
- Existed: November 20, 1951–February 6, 1953

The first use of the FM 1882 designation was in Wise County, from SH 24 (now US 380) in Decatur south 7.0 miles (11.3 km) to a road intersection. On December 17, 1952, the road was extended south 6.0 miles (9.7 km) to SH 114 in Boyd. FM 1882 was cancelled on February 6, 1953, and transferred to FM 730.

=== FM 1882 (1953) ===
Farm to Market Road 1882
- Location: Ellis County
- Existed: March 26, 1953–November 19, 1953

The next use of the FM 1882 designation was in Ellis County, from US 77 in Milford southeast to the Hill County line. Seven months later FM 1882 was cancelled to FM 308.

== FM 1883 ==
Farm to Market Road 1883
- Location: Clay County
- Length: 9.746 mi (15.685 km)
- Existed: November 20, 1951–present

Farm to Market Road 1883 (FM 1883) is located in south central Clay County, with a spur connection to the unincorporated community of Deer Creek.

FM 1883 begins at an intersection with FM 172 and runs south. It then runs to the east, passing Deer Creek, before ending at SH 148. The roadway continues to the east as Lower Slobovia Road.

FM 1883 was designated on November 20, 1951, from FM 172 southwest to Deer Creek, replacing a former segment of that route. On April 29, 1952, FM 1883 was rerouted to end at SH 148. The western end was realigned on November 24, 1959, with the previous route becoming the spur connection to Deer Creek.

== FM 1884 ==
Farm to Market Road 1884
- Location: Parker County
- Length: 7.925 mi (12.754 km)
- Existed: 1951–present

== FM 1885 ==
Farm to Market Road 1885
- Location: Palo Pinto and Parker counties
- Length: 15.474 mi (24.903 km)
- Existed: 1951–present

== FM 1886 ==
Farm to Market Road 1886
- Location: Tarrant and Parker counties
- Length: 9.806 mi (15.781 km)
- Existed: 1951–present

== FM 1887 ==
Farm to Market Road 1887
- Location: Waller County
- Length: 13.694 mi (22.038 km)
- Existed: 1951–present

== RM 1888 ==
Ranch to Market Road 1888
- Location: Blanco, Kendall, and Gillespie counties
- Length: 16.273 mi (26.189 km)
- Existed: May 6, 1964–present

Ranch to Market Road 1888 (RM 1888) is in Blanco, Kendall and Gillespie counties. It runs from RM 1623 westward to RM 1376.

RM 1888 was designated on May 6, 1964, from RM 1623, 5 miles (8.0 km) west of Blanco, westward 3.5 miles (5.6 km). On June 1, 1965, RM 1888 was extended west to RM 1376, completing its current route.

=== FM 1888 (1951) ===
Farm to Market Road 1888
- Location: Bandera and Medina counties
- Existed: November 20, 1951–May 25, 1953

FM 1888 was first designated on November 20, 1951, running from FM 470 at Tarpley southward to the Medina County line at a distance of 2.5 miles (4.0 km). The highway was extended 24.7 miles (39.8 km) to US 90 in Hondo a month later on December 18. FM 1888 was cancelled and transferred to FM 462 on May 25, 1953.

=== FM 1888 (1953) ===
Farm to Market Road 1888
- Location: Falls County
- Existed: June 23, 1953–December 13, 1956

FM 1888 was designated a second time in 1953, running from FM 413 southward to Eloise at a distance of 1.2 miles (1.9 km). The highway was cancelled and transferred to FM 1373 in 1956.

=== FM 1888 (1958) ===
Farm to Market Road 1888
- Location: Hill County
- Existed: October 31, 1958–July 24, 1963

FM 1888 was designated for a third time on October 31, 1958, running from FM 308 at Penelope eastward to a road intersection at a distance of 4.2 miles (6.8 km); part of this route was transferred from Spur 224. The highway was extended 4.3 miles (6.9 km) to SH 171 in Hubbard on November 24, 1959. FM 1888 was deleted on July 24, 1963, with the mileage being transferred to FM 2114.

== FM 1889 ==
Farm to Market Road 1889
- Location: Nueces County
- Length: 4.069 mi (6.548 km)
- Existed: 1951–present

== FM 1890 ==
Farm to Market Road 1890
- Location: Colorado County
- Length: 3.397 mi (5.467 km)
- Existed: 1951–present

== FM 1891 ==
Farm to Market Road 1891
- Location: Lavaca County
- Length: 9.131 mi (14.695 km)
- Existed: 1951–present

Farm to Market Road 1891 (FM 1891) is located in Lavaca County. From a junction with SH 95 north of Shiner, it runs 9.1 miles (14.6 km) east and then south via Wied to US 90 Alt. east of Shiner.

FM 1891 was designated on November 20, 1951, from SH 200 (now US 90 Alt.) north 2.4 miles (3.9 km). On December 17, 1952, it was extended 3.8 miles (6.1 km) northwest. On September 26, 1954, it was extended 3.6 miles (5.8 km) west to SH 95.

== FM 1892 ==
Farm to Market Road 1892
- Location: Anderson County
- Length: 0.884 mi (1,423 m)
- Existed: May 2, 1962–present

Farm to Market Road 1892 (FM 1892) is located in Anderson County. It runs 0.9 miles (1.4 km) from east of Frankston north, then east, to a boat ramp just west of the dam at Lake Palestine, near the headquarters of the Upper Neches River Municipal Water Authority which owns and operates the lake.

=== FM 1892 (1951–1952) ===
Farm to Market Road 1892
- Location: Atascosa County
- Existed: December 18, 1951–January 29, 1953

The first use of the FM 1892 designation was in Atascosa County, from US 281, 1.8 miles (2.9 km) south of the Bexar County line, eastward 3.7 miles (6.0 km) to a county road. On April 29, 1952, the road was extended 2.1 miles (3.4 km) east to the Wilson County line. FM 1892 was cancelled on January 29, 1953, and transferred to FM 536.

=== FM 1892 (1952–1960) ===
Farm to Market Road 1892
- Location: Kendall County
- Existed: December 17, 1952–October 18, 1960

The next use of the FM 1892 designation was in Kendall County, from FM 473 (now RM 473) at Sisterdale south 5.5 miles (8.9 km) toward Boerne. It was numbered on January 29, 1953 or later. On October 28, 1953, the road was extended another 5.0 miles (8.0 km) south, and an additional 2.5 miles (4.0 km) south to US 87 on October 13, 1954. On September 21, 1955, a section from FM 473 to a point 4.0 miles (6.4 km) north was added, creating a concurrency with FM 473. On November 21, 1956, the road was extended north 1.0 mile (1.6 km). On September 27, 1960, the road was extended north 7.5 miles (12.1 km) to the Gillespie County line. FM 1892 was cancelled on October 18, 1960, and transferred to RM 1376.

== FM 1893 ==
Farm to Market Road 1893
- Location: Trinity County
- Length: 0.788 mi (1,268 m)
- Existed: 1951–present

== FM 1894 ==
Farm to Market Road 1894
- Location: Cochran County
- Length: 3.202 mi (5.153 km)
- Existed: 1951–present

== FM 1895 ==
Farm to Market Road 1895
- Location: Kaufman County
- Length: 7.538 mi (12.131 km)
- Existed: March 26, 1953–present

=== FM 1895 (1951) ===
Farm to Market Road 1895
- Location: La Salle County
- Existed: December 18, 1951–January 29, 1953

A previous route numbered FM 1895 was designated on November 20, 1951, from US 81 at Millet southeast 9.0 miles (14.5 km) towards Los Angeles. FM 1895 was cancelled on January 29, 1953, and transferred to FM 469.

== FM 1896 ==
Farm to Market Road 1896
- Location: Franklin and Titus counties
- Length: 11.169 mi (17.975 km)
- Existed: 1951–present

== FM 1897 ==
Farm to Market Road 1897
- Location: Grayson County
- Length: 5.581 mi (8.982 km)
- Existed: 1951–present

== FM 1898 ==
Farm to Market Road 1898
- Location: Kleberg County
- Length: 3.413 mi (5.493 km)
- Existed: October 28, 1953–present

=== FM 1898 (1951) ===
Farm to Market Road 1898
- Location: Grayson County
- Existed: December 18, 1951–November 12, 1953

A previous route numbered FM 1898 was designated on December 18, 1951, from SH 10 (now US 377) at Collinsville east and south 5.9 miles (9.5 km) to Ethel. FM 1898 was cancelled on November 12, 1953, and transferred to FM 902.

== FM 1899 ==
Farm to Market Road 1899
- Location: Mitchell County
- Length: 8.758 mi (14.095 km)
- Existed: October 31, 1958–present

Farm to Market Road 1899 (FM 1899) is located in Mitchell County. Its western terminus is at I-20 exit 220, approximately 2 miles (3.2 km) east of Colorado City; the unimproved roadway that runs south from this interchange is CR 135. It runs northward and then eastward for 8.7 miles (14.0 km) before ending at FM 644, from where the unimproved roadway continues as CR 464.

FM 1899 was designated on October 31, 1958, along the current route. At the time, the route at the eastern terminus was still designated US 80.

=== FM 1899 (1951) ===
Farm to Market Road 1899
- Location: Hartley County
- Existed: November 20, 1951–December 7, 1953

The first use of the FM 1899 designation was in Hartley County, from FM 1712, east 6.0 miles (9.7 km) to a road intersection. On December 1, 1953, the road was extended east 6.5 miles (10.5 km) to the Moore County line. FM 1899 was cancelled on December 7, 1953, and transferred to FM 281.

=== FM 1899 (1953) ===
Farm to Market Road 1899
- Location: Taylor County
- Existed: October 29, 1953–September 2, 1955

The next use of the FM 1899 designation was in Taylor County, from US 277 at View to a point 4.5 miles (7.2 km) north. FM 1899 was cancelled on September 2, 1955, and transferred to FM 1235.
