= Winnsboro Airport (Texas) =

Winnsboro Municipal Airport Frank M. White Memorial Airport
- IATA: none; ICAO: none; FAA LID: F51

Summary
- Airport type: Public
- Owner: City of Winnsboro, Texas
- Serves: Winnsboro, Texas
- Elevation AMSL: 513 ft / 156 m
- Coordinates: 32°56′20″N 95°16′44″W
- Website: winnsborotexas.com/city-services/winnsboro-municipal-airport.html

Map

Runways
Direction	Length		Surface
Direction	ft	m	Surface
1/19	3,213	979	Asphalt

The Winnsboro Municipal Airport/Frank M. White Memorial Airport (FAA LID: F51) is located near Winnsboro, Texas and is a municipally operated airport in the northeast area of Wood County, Texas.

== Infrastructure ==
The airport has a single asphalt runway, 1/19, with dimensions 3,213 by 50 feet (979 m × 15 m).
