= Mineola Airport =

Mineola–Wisener Field Airport
- IATA: none; ICAO: none; FAA LID: 3F9

Summary
- Airport type: Private
- Owner: R. H. Wisener
- Serves: Mineola, Texas
- Elevation AMSL: 429 ft / 131 m
- Coordinates: 32°40′36″N 095°30′39″W
- Website: www.mineolawisener.com

Map

Runways
Direction	Length		Surface
Direction	ft	m	Surface
17/35	3,203	976	Asphalt

Mineola–Wisener Field Airport (FAA LID: 3F9), a privately owned public use airport also known as the Mineola Airport and Wisener Field, was established in 1917. It has been under continuous operation by the same family since 1926. It is considered the oldest privately operated public use airport in the state of Texas. The field has been designated by the Texas Historical Commission as a Texas Treasure Business.

== Early history ==
Weisner Field was established in 1917. On July 4, 1917, a Curtis JN-4D, known as a "Jenny" biplane, landed at Weisner Field. It was piloted by a U.S. Army Signal Corps soldier. The airport was called Massengale Meadow at the time. The airport was used by military aircraft during World War I. In addition, it was home of the Royal Flying Circus in the 1920s. A number of well-known aviators have flown into Wisener Field. These have included Wiley Post, "Slats" Rogers, Tommy Grace and Fay Lucille Cox. United States Senators Lyndon B. Johnson (later U.S. President), Phil Graham, and Kay Bailey Hutchison have flown into the airport.

== Infrastructure ==
The airport has a single asphalt runway, 17/35, that measures 3,203 ft × 40 ft (976 m × 12 m). It is in poor condition due to rough areas and loose aggregate.

== See also ==
- List of airports in Texas
