= Wood County, Texas =

County in Texas, United States

- County
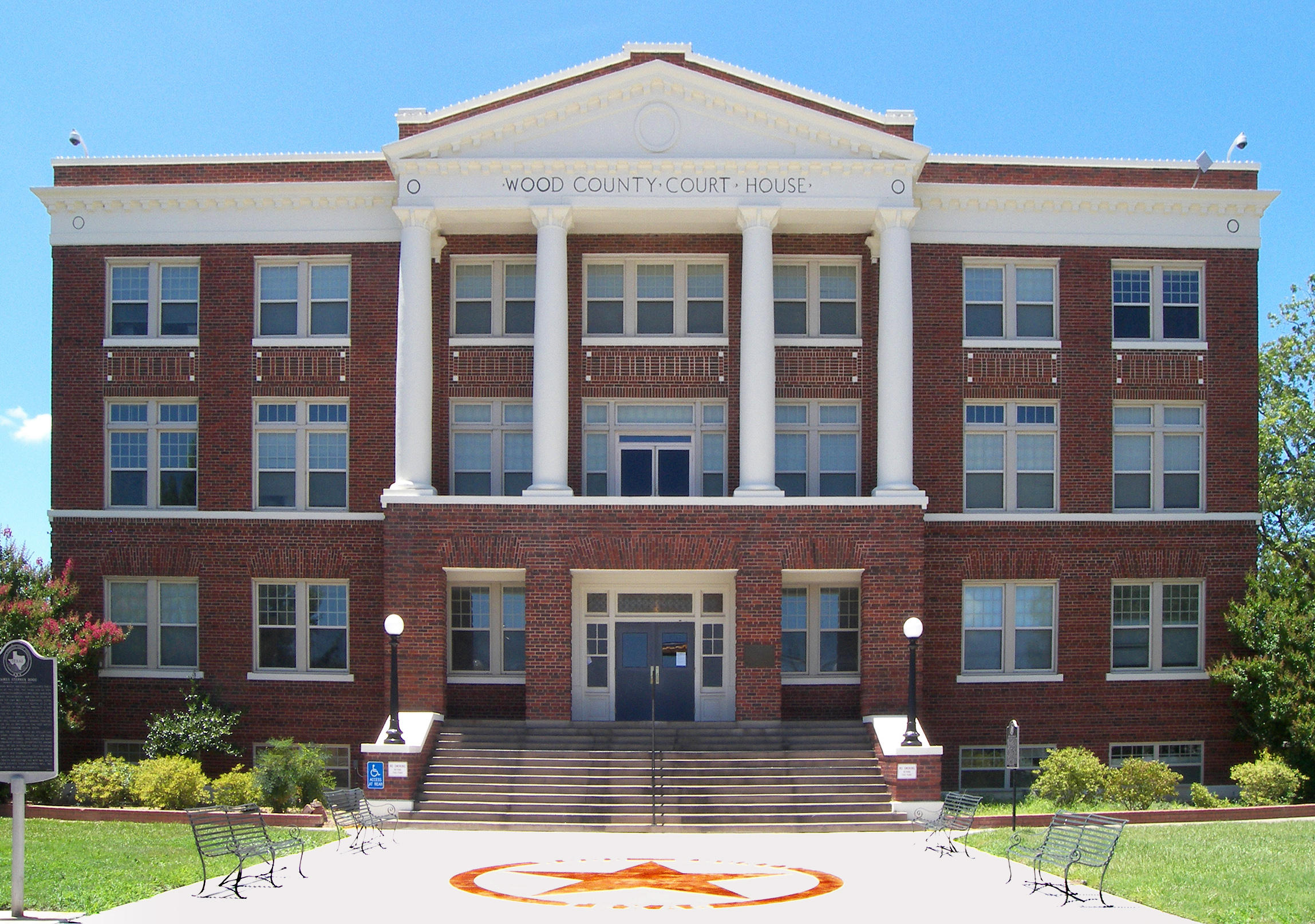
- The Wood County Courthouse in Quitman

- Seal

- Location within the U.S. state of Texas
- Coordinates: 32°47′N 95°23′W
- Country: United States
- State: Texas
- Founded: 1850
- Named for: George Tyler Wood
- Seat: Quitman
- Largest city: Mineola

Area
  - Total: 695.719 sq mi (1,801.90 km^{2})
  - Land: 645.234 sq mi (1,671.15 km^{2})
  - Water: 50.484 sq mi (130.75 km^{2}) 7.3%

Population (2020)
  - Total: 44,843
  - Estimate (2025): 49,688 ▲
  - Density: 69.499/sq mi (26.834/km^{2})
- Time zone: UTC−6 (Central)
  - Summer (DST): UTC−5 (CDT)
- Congressional district: 5th
- Website: www.mywoodcounty.com

Wood County is a county located in the U.S. state of Texas. As of the 2020 census, its population was 44,843. Its county seat is Quitman. The county was named for George T. Wood, governor of Texas from 1847 to 1849.

== History ==
The first documented European exploration of what is now Wood County took place in the late 18th century, when Pedro Vial, was sent on expeditions by the Spanish governor of Texas. After marching all the way to Santa Fe in 1787, he headed east to Natchitoches. The following year, he passed through today's Wood County on his way back to San Antonio. Some archeological evidence suggests that a French trading post stood along Mill Race Creek in the early 1700s near the site of the modern town of Hainsville. The French may have build a military post called Fort Ledout near Black Oak in Wood County, but other than the archeological evidence, little is known about any possible French settlements.

An important archeological discovery made by a hunting party in 1887, southeast of Hainsville and north of Bromley, suggests that Native Americans may have engaged in a battle either between different tribes or with the Spanish. Despite finding many relics, including a cross, tomahawk pieces, a Spanish coin, and several broken muskets, no written record of any such encounter has been found. Some Spanish and Mexican land grants were issued in the area, but settlement was sparse until after the Texas Revolution. The first White settler was Martin Varner. He built his home near the southeast side of what is now Hainsville at least by 1824. The first organized settlement was at Webster in 1845.

In 1850, after Texas was annexed to the United States, the Legislature authorized the forming of the county from Van Zandt County. In 1849, residents of what was then Van Zandt County north of the Sabine River, petitioned the legislature for the county to be reorganized. Reasons included that the majority of the population lived north of the river, and that travel to Jordan's Saline, then the county seat, was difficult in winter. Wood County was created and Van Zandt was reorganized with territory from adjacent counties.

=== Early industry ===
Early industry included a number of sawmills, gristmills, steam mills, and cotton gins. A jug factory operated north of the Big Sandy Creek in the 1850s. A second jug factory was built some years later near Holly Creek. Two brick kilns are known to have been located in the area of Winnsboro. Wigley Furniture Company began operating in Mineola in 1874. A cane and rawhide-bottom chair factory opened in 1886. Tie-cutting became a major industry in the county in the 1870s with the coming of the railroads. Pine Mills, Perryville, Ogburn, Merrimac, Peach, and Fouke got their start as sawmill towns.

=== Civil War era ===
Wood County had only 17 slaves by 1850, but that number ballooned 10 years later to 923, estimated at 20% of the population. Wood County voted for secession by a 70% majority. The two delegates to the Secession Convention, though, both opposed secession.

The first soldiers raised for the Confederacy in Wood County were Company A, 10th Texas Cavalry Regiment. A training ground called Camp Flournoy was established east of Quitman. Another company called the Wood County Rebels was formed on August 5, 1861. They then requested active duty as cavalry.

=== Coming of the railroads ===
The Texas and Pacific Railroad came through the southern portion of the county in 1873 and formed a junction with the International and Great Northern Railroad at Sodom, which was later renamed Mineola, on a Longview-to-Dallas route. The railroads came to the northern portion of the county in 1876, when the East Line and Red River Railroad laid track from Jefferson to Greenville. This segment later was absorbed by the Louisiana, Arkansas, and Texas Railroad. The Texas Shortline Railroad also ran between Alba and Grand Saline in Van Zandt County.

=== Discovery of coal ===
Coal was discovered in the Alba area in sometime before 1900. The operating mines were for lignite coal.

=== Discovery of oil ===
Oil was discovered in Wood County in 1941, and the county produced 25×10^{6} bbl (4.0×10^{6} m^{3}) of oil per year by 1948. Developed oilfields in Wood County include the Pine Mills Oilfield and the Alba Oilfield.

== Geography ==
According to the U.S. Census Bureau, the county has a total area of 695.7 sq mi (1,801.9 km^{2}), of which 645.2 sq mi (1,671.1 km^{2}) are land and 50.5 sq mi (130.8 km^{2}, 7.3%) are covered by water.

=== Adjacent counties ===
- Hopkins County (north)
- Franklin County (northeast)
- Camp County (northeast)
- Upshur County (east)
- Smith County (south)
- Van Zandt County (southwest)
- Rains County (west)

=== National protected areas ===
- Little Sandy National Wildlife Refuge

== Communities ==
=== Municipalities and incorporated towns ===
These municipalities and towns are incorporated under the laws of the state of Texas, meaning they have elected governments and officially recognized municipal, town, or village governments:

- Alba
- Hawkins
- Mineola
- Quitman
- Winnsboro
- Yantis

=== Census-designated place ===
- Holly Lake Ranch

=== Unincorporated settlements and towns ===
The following are not incorporated but recognized as active settlements through community centers, churches, and similar geographic, historic, and physical landmarks:

- Cartwright
- Coke
- Crow
- East Point
- Forest Hill
- Fouke
- Golden
- Hainesville
- Hoard
- Little Hope
- New Hope
- Oak Grove
- Ogburn
- Perryville
- Pine Mills
- Pineview
- Pleasant Grove
- Stout

=== Small communities, ghost towns, and former settlements ===
Wood County previously had a number of settlements. In 1884, 35 settlements were in the county where the Texas Legislature ordered schools to be established.

- Calvary
- Coldwater
- Gilbreth
- Gunter
- Salem
- Webster
- Westbrook

== Demographics ==
Historical population
| Census | Pop. | Note | %± |
|---|---|---|---|
| 1860 | 4,968 | | — |
| 1870 | 6,894 | | 38.8% |
| 1880 | 11,212 | | 62.6% |
| 1890 | 13,932 | | 24.3% |
| 1900 | 21,048 | | 51.1% |
| 1910 | 23,417 | | 11.3% |
| 1920 | 27,707 | | 18.3% |
| 1930 | 24,183 | | −12.7% |
| 1940 | 24,360 | | 0.7% |
| 1950 | 21,308 | | −12.5% |
| 1960 | 17,653 | | −17.2% |
| 1970 | 18,589 | | 5.3% |
| 1980 | 24,697 | | 32.9% |
| 1990 | 29,380 | | 19.0% |
| 2000 | 36,752 | | 25.1% |
| 2010 | 41,964 | | 14.2% |
| 2020 | 44,843 | | 6.9% |
| 2025 (est.) | 49,688 | ▲ | 10.8% |
U.S. Decennial Census; 1850–2010 2010 2020

=== Racial and ethnic composition ===
Wood County, Texas – Racial and ethnic composition Note: the US Census treats Hispanic/Latino as an ethnic category. This table excludes Latinos from the racial categories and assigns them to a separate category. Hispanics/Latinos may be of any race.
| Race / Ethnicity (NH = Non-Hispanic) | Pop 1980 | Pop 1990 | Pop 2000 | Pop 2010 | Pop 2020 | % 1980 | % 1990 | % 2000 | % 2010 | % 2020 |
|---|---|---|---|---|---|---|---|---|---|---|
| White alone (NH) | 21,775 | 26,069 | 31,848 | 35,628 | 35,906 | 88.17% | 88.73% | 86.66% | 84.90% | 80.07% |
| Black or African American alone (NH) | 2,553 | 2,374 | 2,243 | 1,951 | 1,658 | 10.34% | 8.08% | 6.10% | 4.65% | 3.70% |
| Native American or Alaska Native alone (NH) | 53 | 105 | 167 | 198 | 227 | 0.21% | 0.36% | 0.45% | 0.47% | 0.51% |
| Asian alone (NH) | 29 | 39 | 69 | 156 | 230 | 0.12% | 0.13% | 0.19% | 0.37% | 0.51% |
| Native Hawaiian or Pacific Islander alone (NH) | x | x | 8 | 12 | 1 | x | x | 0.02% | 0.03% | 0.00% |
| Other race alone (NH) | 4 | 5 | 19 | 8 | 138 | 0.02% | 0.02% | 0.05% | 0.02% | 0.31% |
| Mixed race or Multiracial (NH) | x | x | 296 | 460 | 1,789 | x | x | 0.81% | 1.10% | 3.99% |
| Hispanic or Latino (any race) | 283 | 788 | 2,102 | 3,551 | 4,894 | 1.15% | 2.68% | 5.72% | 8.46% | 10.91% |
| Total | 24,697 | 29,380 | 36,752 | 41,964 | 44,843 | 100.00% | 100.00% | 100.00% | 100.00% | 100.00% |

=== 2020 census ===
As of the 2020 census, the county had a population of 44,843. The median age was 50.5 years; 18.5% of the residents were under 18 and 28.7% were 65 or older. The female/male ratio was 1:0.981 overall and 1:0.6.7 for those 18 and over.

The racial makeup of the county was 82.2% White, 3.8% Black or African American, 0.8% American Indian and Alaska Native, 0.5% Asian, <0.1% Native Hawaiian and Pacific Islander, 4.9% from some other race, and 7.9% from two or more races. Hispanic or Latino residents of any race comprised 10.9% of the population.

About 12.7% of residents lived in urban areas, while 87.3% lived in rural areas.

Of the 18,447 households in the county, 23.0% had children under 18 living in them, 53.5% were married-couple households, 17.1% were households with a male householder and no spouse or partner present, and 24.3% were households with a female householder and no spouse or partner present. About 27.6% of all households were made up of individuals, and 15.9% had someone living alone who was 65 or older.

The county had 22,129 housing units, of which 16.6% were vacant. Among occupied housing units, 78.5% were owner-occupied and 21.5% were renter-occupied. The homeowner vacancy rate was 2.0% and the rental vacancy rate was 9.0%.

=== 2000 census ===
As of the census of 2000, 36,752 people, 14,583 households, and 10,645 families were residing in the county. The population density was 56 inhabitants per square mile (22/km^{2}). The 17,939 housing units averaged 28/sq mi (11/km^{2}). The racial makeup of the county was 89.11% White, 6.12% African American, 0.55% Native American, 0.20% Asian, 2.93% from other races, and 1.09% from two or more races. About 5.72% of the population were Hispanics or Latinos of any race.

Of the 14,583 households, 26.70% had children under 18 living with them, 61.50% were married couples living together, 8.20% had a female householder with no husband present, and 27.00% were not families. About 24.10% of all households were made up of individuals, and 13.20% had someone living alone who was 65 or older. The average household size was 2.42, and the average family size was 2.85.

In the county, the age distribution was 21.80% under 18, 7.90% from 18 to 24, 22.90% from 25 to 44, 26.40% from 45 to 64, and 20.90% who were 65 or older. The median age was 43 years. For every 100 females, there were 97.10 males. For every 100 females age 18 and over, there were 95.10 males.

The median income for a household in the county was US$32,885, and for a family was US$38,219. Males had a median income of US$30,558 versus US$20,209 for females. The per capita income for the county was US$17,702. About 10.80% of families and 14.30% of the population were below the poverty line, including 20.50% of those under age 18 and 10.30% of those age 65 or over.

== Transportation ==
Wood County includes the intersection of two major U.S. highways; US 69 and US 80 intersect in the city of Mineola's downtown area. Texas Highway 37 connects Mineola and Quitman off US 69.

=== Major highways ===
- U.S. Highway 69
- U.S. Highway 80
- State Highway 11
- State Highway 37
- State Highway 154
- State Highway 182
- Loop 173
- Loop 564

=== Farm-to-Market roads ===
Wood County includes all or part of these Texas Farm-to-Market roads:

- FM 14
- FM 17
- FM 49
- FM 69
- FM 115
- FM 288
- FM 312
- FM 514
- FM 515
- FM 778
- FM 779
- FM 852
- FM 1254
- FM 1483
- FM 1643
- FM 1647
- FM 1795
- FM 1799
- FM 1801
- FM 1804
- FM 2088
- FM 2225
- FM 2422
- FM 2455
- FM 2659
- FM 2869
- FM 2911
- FM 2966
- FM 3056

=== Railroads ===
Wood County is currently served by Amtrak's Texas Eagle passenger railway line. The railroad tracks that run through the southern portion of Wood County and through Mineola are currently owned and operated by Union Pacific.

=== Airports ===
Wood County is served by three airports, located in Mineola, Quitman, and Winnsboro:

- Mineola Wisner Field is identified as 3F9. This airport was established in 1917, and has been operated by the same family owners since 1926.
- Wood County Airport (Mineola/Quitman Airport) is a public airport owned by Wood County.
- Winnsboro Municipal Airport is located south of the city of Winnsboro and is a municipally owned airport facility.

== Media ==
Wood County is in the Tyler-Longview media market. It is currently served by two local newspapers, and daily newspapers and television stations from other parts of the East Texas area.

=== Newspapers ===
Wood County has five newspapers published within its borders: Wood County Now, Wood County Monitor, Winnsboro News, Yantis Tymes, and The Community Chronicle. The Winnsboro News also serves Franklin County, as Winnsboro is split between the two counties.

Wood County Monitor

In August 2016, two of the county's longstanding newspaper operations, the Mineola Monitor and the Wood County Democrat, were merged by their owner, Bluebonnet Publishing. Prior to that, the Mineola Monitor operated under its own masthead in Mineola, and the Wood County Democrat operated under its own masthead in Quitman. Staffing at the newspapers did not change, and the staffs of both newspapers were merged.

Winnsboro News

The Winnsboro News, founded in 1908, is a weekly newspaper in Winnsboro, serving Wood and Franklin Counties. In August 2003, the newspaper gained notoriety for publishing an editorial by publisher Tom Pendergast outing an LGBTQ couple living in the city.

Wood County Now

In 2020, in the midst of the coronavirus pandemic, a free news source available by social media and online was established. Owner Amanda Duncan originally created the social-media accounts to keep residents informed of the pandemic and rising case numbers, and to help showcase small businesses that were financially struggling. Within eight months, the news outlet grew to be the largest social-media and online news source in Wood County.

=== Radio stations ===
Wood County is served by two local radio stations.

KWNS

KWNS is a Southern Gospel radio station located in Winnsboro. It broadcasts at 104.7 FM.

KMOO

KMOO is located in Mineola, broadcasting at 99.9 FM. The country music station is currently owned by Hightower Radio. The station was formerly operated by Sam Curry, its founder, who founded it in 1963. Under Curry's tenure, the station was referred to by its ownership and on-air personalities as, "K M Double O," and on-air personalities were not allowed to call the station "KMOO," with the last three letters pronounced in a manner similar to a noise made by cattle. Curry sold the station in 1995 when he planned to embark on a race for Wood County judge as a Democrat, a race he ultimately lost.

== Government ==
Wood County is located within District 5 of the Texas House of Representativesand District 1 of the Texas Senate.

Wood County is represented in the Texas House of Representatives by the Republican Bryan Hughes, a lawyer in Mineola and a native of Wood County. The county is split between two U.S. congressional districts, the First and the Fifth. Thus, the county is represented by Congressman Nathaniel Moran and Congressman Lance Gooden, and currently isrepresented in the Texas Senate by Kevin Eltife.

The current county judge is Lucy Hebron, elected in 2018. As county judge, Hebron is both the county's chief administrator and judge of the constitutional county court, which handles misdemeanor cases.

In 2017, former Sheriff Jim Brown and former Chief Deputy Miles Tucker were arrested for various offenses stemming from a shooting incident over access to an oilfield lease. Two of the felony charges were dismissed, however as of January 2020, four misdemeanor charges remain pending.

=== Historic election results ===
In spite of an increasing number of voters in every U.S. presidential election since 1992, the percentage of registered Wood County voters turning out to vote in presidential elections has fallen about 10% between 1992 and 2012.

United States presidential election results for Wood County, Texas
| Year | Republican | | Democratic | | Third party(ies) | |
| Year | No. | % | No. | % | No. | % |
|---|---|---|---|---|---|---|
| 1912 | 146 | 7.21% | 1,441 | 71.16% | 438 | 21.63% |
| 1916 | 248 | 10.35% | 1,719 | 71.77% | 428 | 17.87% |
| 1920 | 798 | 25.25% | 1,643 | 51.99% | 719 | 22.75% |
| 1924 | 342 | 10.43% | 2,806 | 85.55% | 132 | 4.02% |
| 1928 | 1,161 | 41.38% | 1,645 | 58.62% | 0 | 0.00% |
| 1932 | 189 | 5.38% | 3,308 | 94.08% | 19 | 0.54% |
| 1936 | 192 | 6.51% | 2,751 | 93.25% | 7 | 0.24% |
| 1940 | 585 | 13.77% | 3,659 | 86.11% | 5 | 0.12% |
| 1944 | 485 | 12.00% | 3,045 | 75.35% | 511 | 12.65% |
| 1948 | 629 | 16.19% | 2,590 | 66.67% | 666 | 17.14% |
| 1952 | 2,748 | 47.54% | 3,026 | 52.35% | 6 | 0.10% |
| 1956 | 2,508 | 53.11% | 2,199 | 46.57% | 15 | 0.32% |
| 1960 | 2,400 | 46.95% | 2,633 | 51.51% | 79 | 1.55% |
| 1964 | 2,068 | 36.89% | 3,528 | 62.93% | 10 | 0.18% |
| 1968 | 2,046 | 32.69% | 2,192 | 35.02% | 2,021 | 32.29% |
| 1972 | 4,746 | 71.28% | 1,842 | 27.67% | 70 | 1.05% |
| 1976 | 3,076 | 42.57% | 4,107 | 56.84% | 43 | 0.60% |
| 1980 | 4,515 | 52.07% | 4,033 | 46.51% | 123 | 1.42% |
| 1984 | 7,144 | 67.32% | 3,449 | 32.50% | 19 | 0.18% |
| 1988 | 6,216 | 54.69% | 4,553 | 40.06% | 597 | 5.25% |
| 1992 | 4,708 | 38.22% | 4,084 | 33.15% | 3,526 | 28.62% |
| 1996 | 6,228 | 51.21% | 4,711 | 38.74% | 1,222 | 10.05% |
| 2000 | 9,810 | 70.66% | 3,893 | 28.04% | 181 | 1.30% |
| 2004 | 12,831 | 75.79% | 4,034 | 23.83% | 64 | 0.38% |
| 2008 | 13,658 | 76.80% | 4,010 | 22.55% | 116 | 0.65% |
| 2012 | 14,351 | 81.63% | 3,056 | 17.38% | 174 | 0.99% |
| 2016 | 15,700 | 83.84% | 2,630 | 14.04% | 397 | 2.12% |
| 2020 | 19,049 | 83.63% | 3,509 | 15.40% | 221 | 0.97% |
| 2024 | 20,621 | 84.56% | 3,618 | 14.84% | 147 | 0.60% |

United States Senate election results for Wood County, Texas1
| Year | Republican | | Democratic | | Third party(ies) | |
| Year | No. | % | No. | % | No. | % |
|---|---|---|---|---|---|---|
| 2024 | 20,129 | 82.75% | 3,757 | 15.45% | 438 | 1.80% |

United States Senate election results for Wood County, Texas2
| Year | Republican | | Democratic | | Third party(ies) | |
| Year | No. | % | No. | % | No. | % |
|---|---|---|---|---|---|---|
| 2020 | 18,757 | 83.48% | 3,318 | 14.77% | 395 | 1.76% |

Texas Gubernatorial election results for Wood County
| Year | Republican | | Democratic | | Third party(ies) | |
| Year | No. | % | No. | % | No. | % |
|---|---|---|---|---|---|---|
| 2022 | 15,678 | 86.27% | 2,331 | 12.83% | 164 | 0.90% |

=== Elections mapped by Precinct ===
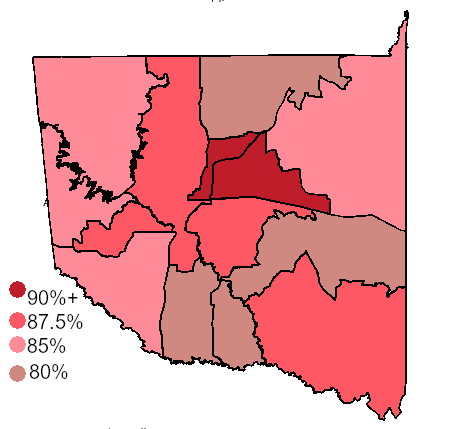
2024 Primary Results. All precincts were won by Donald Trump. The numbers denote total percentage of the votes awarded to Trump, not margin of victory.

==== 2024 ====
Republican: Donald Trump won every precinct with total percentages of over 80%. Nikki Haley came in second in every precinct.

For more election results in Wood County, see this group of maps.

== Education ==
=== Early schools ===
There were a number of so-called "subscription schools" in Wood County after 1854, when free public schools in Texas were on the rise due to legislative action. In 1852, a log schoolhouse in the western part of the county near Chaney Crossing on Lake Fork was built. By 1854, school was being taught in Quitman. By 1859, Quitman had three schools that required tuition to be paid.

On January 8, 1884, the Texas legislature required the county to be divided into free public school districts. The school districts established by the legislature were Quitman, Lone Star, Myrtle Springs, Forest Hill, Cartwright, Caney, Rock Hill, Forest Home, Winnsboro, Chalybeate Springs, Spring Hill, Smyrna, Cold Springs, Shady Grove, Center Point, Pleasant Grove, Floyd's Common Ridge, Mount Pisgah, Liberty, Sand Springs, Fletcher, Pleasant Divide, Friendship, Lone Pint, Salem, Webster, Persimmon Grove, Cottonwood, Macedonia, Concord, New Hope, Dyess, Mount Enterprise, and "Albia" (Alba). Free school districts for African Americans were established at Quitman, Cedar Tree, Robinson's Chapel, Muddy Creek, Mount Zion, Tranquil, Center, Hawkins, Shiloh and "District 48" which encompassed all of the district west of Lake Fork.

=== School districts ===
Portions of the county are served by 11 separate independent school districts, serving students in pre-kindergarten through 12th grade:

- Alba-Golden ISD (small portion in Rains County)
- Big Sandy ISD (mostly Upshur County, small portion in Wood County)
- Como-Pickton CISD (mostly Hopkins County, small portion in Wood County)
- Harmony ISD (mostly Upshur County, small portion in Wood County)
- Hawkins ISD
- Mineola ISD
- Pittsburg ISD (mostly Camp County, small portion in Wood County)
- Quitman ISD
- Union Hill ISD (mostly Upshur County, small portion in Wood County)
- Winnsboro ISD (small portions in Franklin and Hopkins counties)
- Yantis ISD (small portion in Hopkins County)

=== Colleges and universities ===
Jarvis Christian College is located in unincorporated Wood County, near Hawkins.

== Culture ==
Wood County is home to a number of historic and natural preservation sites, Recorded Texas Historic Landmarks, special districts, and cities and businesses with special designations from various national and state bodies.

=== Historic sites ===
==== National Register listings ====
See National Register of Historic Places in Wood County, Texas

==== Landmark districts ====
Mineola Downtown Historic District

==== Main Street cities ====
- Mineola
- Winnsboro

=== Institutions and businesses with special state designations ===
==== Texas Business Treasure Award recipients (Texas Historical Commission Designation) ====
- Broadway Barber Shop (Mineola)
- Wisener Field (Mineola)
- First National Bank of Winnsboro
- R.H. McCrary Hardware (Winnsboro)

== Notable people ==
- Willie Brown, California politician
- Bryan Hughes, Texas state representative
- Bobby Ray Inman, U.S. Navy Admiral
- Ray Price, singer/songwriter; member of the Country Music Hall of Fame
- Harold Simmons, American billionaire businessman
- Sissy Spacek, Academy Award-winning actress
- Kacey Musgraves, musician
- Mack Tuck, professional basketball player and coach

== See also ==
- National Register of Historic Places listings in Wood County, Texas
- Recorded Texas Historic Landmarks in Wood County
