= Mack Tuck =

American basketball player

Qingdao DoubleStar
- Title: Assistant coach
- League: CBA

Personal information
- Born: February 21, 1975 (age 51) Mineola, Texas, U.S.
- Listed height: 6 ft 6 in (1.98 m)

Career information
- High school: Mineola (Mineola, Texas)
- College: Colorado (1993–1996); Central Oklahoma (1996–1997)
- NBA draft: 1997: undrafted
- Playing career: 1999–2009
- Position: Small forward
- Number: 8, 10
- Coaching career: 2009–present

Career history

Playing
- 1999: Villa Duarte
- 1999: Marineros de Puerto Plata
- 1999–2000: Winnipeg Cyclone
- 2000: Villa Duarte
- 2000–2001: Winnipeg Cyclones
- 2001: Marineros de Puerto Plata
- 2001: San Carlos
- 2001: Cocodrilos de Caracas
- 2001–2002: MPC Donar
- 2002: Marineros de Puerto Plata
- 2002–2003: Portugal Telecom
- 2003: Marineros de Cozumel
- 2003–2004: CSKA Sofia
- 2004–2005: Shandong Jinsidun Lions
- 2005–2006: Aveiro Basket
- 2006: Cocodrilos de Caracas
- 2006–2009: Shandong Jinsidun Lions

Coaching
- 2009–2013: Shandong Lions (assistant)
- 2013: Rizing Fukuoka
- 2017–present: Qingdao DoubleStar (assistant)

Career highlights
- As player: DBL Most Valuable Player (2002); NBL All-Star (2004); LPB All-Star (2003)

Mack Tuck (born February 21, 1975) is an American former basketball player and current coach born in Mineola, Texas. He was the head coach of the Japanese team Rizing Fukuoka of the bj league in 2013.

== Coaching career ==
From 2009 till 2011 Tuck was assistant coach for the Shandong Lions of the CBA. In August 2013, the Japanese bj league team Rizing Fukuoka hired Tuck as their new head coach. In June 2017, Tuck became an assistant coach of Qingdao DoubleStar.

== Head coaching record ==
Legend
Regular season	G	Games coached	W	Games won	L	Games lost	W–L %	Win–loss %
Playoffs	PG	Playoff games	PW	Playoff wins	PL	Playoff losses	PW–L %	Playoff win–loss %

Team	Year	G	W	L	W–L%	Finish	PG	PW	PL	PW–L%	Result
Rizing Fukuoka	2013	0	0	0	–	Fired	-	-	-	–	-
