= Mineola Independent School District =

School district in Texas

Address
- 1695 West Loop 564 Mineola, Wood County, Texas, 75773-9998; United States

District information
- Type: Independent school district
- Motto: Learning today, leading tomorrow.
- Grades: K — Twelfth
- Superintendent: J. Cody Mize
- School board: Dr. John Abbott; Glen Dossett; Dr. Kyle Gully; Daniel Louderman; Jay McGough; Jill Quiambao; Jackie Lee Rodieck
- Governing agency: Texas Education Agency
- Schools: Mineola High School (Grades 9-12); Mineola Middle School (Grades 6-8); Mineola Intermediate School (Grades 4-5); Mineola Primary School (Grades K-3)
- Budget: $16,209,000 USD
- NCES District ID: 4830930

Students and staff
- Enrollment: 1,665
- Teachers: 128.44 (on an FTE basis)
- Staff: 118.22
- Student–teacher ratio: 12.57
- Athletic conference: UIL Class AAA Division 1
- District mascot: Yellow Jacket/Lady Yellow Jacket
- Colors: Orange & White

Other information
- Website: www.mineolaisd.net

Mineola Independent School District is a public school district based in Mineola, Texas (USA).

In 2009, the school district was rated academically acceptable by the Texas Education Agency.

== See also ==
- List of school districts in Texas
