= Hawkins Independent School District =

School district in Texas

Hawkins Independent School District is a public school district based in Hawkins, Texas (USA).

Hawkins ISD has three campuses - Hawkins High (Grades 9-12), Hawkins Middle (Grades 6-8), and Hawkins Elementary. (Grades PK-5)

In 2009, the school district was rated "academically acceptable" by the Texas Education Agency.
