= Winnsboro Independent School District =

School district in Texas

Address
- 505 South Chestnut Street Bldg. C Winnsboro, Wood County, Texas, 75494-2628; United States

District information
- Type: Independent school district
- Motto: Winnsboro Independent School District fosters a community of life-long learners by providing an environment that builds self-worth, integrity, and respect for others while striving for academic and social excellence.
- Grades: Kindergarten — Twelfth
- Established: 26 March 1917 (109 years ago)
- Superintendent: Dave Wilcox
- Governing agency: Texas Education Agency
- Schools: Winnsboro High School (Grades 9-12); Winnsboro Junior High School (Grades 6-8); Winnsboro Memorial Intermediate School (Grades 3-5); Winnsboro Elementary School (Grades K-2)
- Budget: $12,831,000 USD
- NCES District ID: 4836300

Students and staff
- Students: 1,522
- Teachers: 109.49
- Staff: 115.28
- Student–teacher ratio: 13.9
- Colors: Red & Black

Other information
- School board President: Chris McElyea
- School board Vice-President: Clara Ziegler
- School board: Brian Busby; Ken Goodson; Brandon Green; Barry McKee; Ron Smedley
- Website: www.winnsboroisd.org

Winnsboro Independent School District is an independent school district based in Winnsboro, Texas, United States. Located in northeastern Wood County, the district extends into southeast Hopkins and southern Franklin Counties. In 2013, the school district was rated "met standard" by the Texas Education Agency.
