= Quitman Independent School District =

School district in Texas, United States

Address
- 1201 East Goode Street Quitman, Wood County, Texas, 75783-1640; United States
- Coordinates: 32.7974°N 95.4283°W

District information
- Type: Independent school district
- Motto: Educating every child...Every Chance...Every Day
- Grades: K — Twelfth
- Established: 22 July 1919 (107 years ago)
- Superintendent: Christopher Mason
- Asst. superintendent(s): Bryan Hurst
- Governing agency: Texas Education Agency
- Schools: Quitman High School; Quitman Junior High School; Quitman Elementary School
- Budget: $13,452,700 USD
- NCES District ID: 4836300

Students and staff
- Enrollment: 1,121
- Teachers: 90.58 (on an FTE basis)
- Staff: 80.55
- Student–teacher ratio: 12.38
- Athletic conference: UIL Class AAA
- District mascot: Bulldog/Lady Bulldogs
- Colors: Red; White; Blue

Other information
- School board President: Dr. Jeremy Smith
- School board Vice-President: Doug Cameron
- School board Secretary: Royce Patterson
- School board: Jane Herring; James Hicks; Michael Hipp III; Raymond Peek
- Website: www.quitmanisd.net

Quitman Independent School District is an Independent school district based in Quitman, Texas.

In 2015, the district was rated Met Standard by the Texas Education Agency.
