= Winnsboro, Texas =

- City
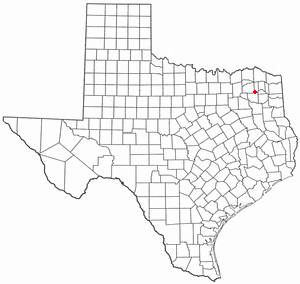
- Location of Winnsboro, Texas

- Coordinates: 32°57′22″N 95°17′27″W
- Country: United States
- State: Texas
- Counties: Wood, Franklin

Area
  - Total: 3.76 sq mi (9.73 km^{2})
  - Land: 3.74 sq mi (9.69 km^{2})
  - Water: 0.015 sq mi (0.04 km^{2})
- Elevation: 509 ft (155 m)

Population (2020)
  - Total: 3,455
  - Density: 923/sq mi (357/km^{2})
- Time zone: UTC-6 (Central (CST))
  - Summer (DST): UTC-5 (CDT)
- ZIP code: 75494
- Area codes: 430, 903
- FIPS code: 48-79816
- GNIS feature ID: 2412285
- Website: winnsborotexas.com

Winnsboro is a city in Franklin and Wood Counties in northeastern Texas, United States, north of Tyler. Its population was 3,455 at the 2020 census. Settlement of Winnsboro began in the 1850s with a post office established between 1854 and 1855.

== Geography ==
Winnsboro is located in northeastern Wood County and southwestern Franklin County in Northeast Texas.

According to the United States Census Bureau, the city has a total area of 9.65 square kilometres (3.73 sq mi), of which 0.04 km^{2} (0.02 sq mi), or 0.40%, is covered by water. The city center and about three-quarters of its area are in Wood County, with the remainder in Franklin County.

Texas State Highway 11 passes through the city as Broadway Street, leading east 21 miles (34 km) to Pittsburg and northwest 23 miles (37 km) to Sulphur Springs. Highway 37 (Main Street) crosses Highway 11 in the center of town, leading north 17 miles (27 km) to Mount Vernon and southwest 25 miles (40 km) to Mineola. Tyler is 50 miles (80 km) south via Highway 37 and U.S. Route 69.

=== Climate ===
The climate in this area is characterized by hot, humid summers and generally mild to cool winters. According to the Köppen climate classification, Winnsboro has a humid subtropical climate, Cfa on climate maps.

== Demographics ==
Historical population
| Census | Pop. | Note | %± |
|---|---|---|---|
| 1890 | 388 | | — |
| 1900 | 899 | | 131.7% |
| 1910 | 1,741 | | 93.7% |
| 1920 | 2,184 | | 25.4% |
| 1930 | 1,905 | | −12.8% |
| 1940 | 2,092 | | 9.8% |
| 1950 | 2,512 | | 20.1% |
| 1960 | 2,675 | | 6.5% |
| 1970 | 3,064 | | 14.5% |
| 1980 | 3,458 | | 12.9% |
| 1990 | 2,904 | | −16.0% |
| 2000 | 3,584 | | 23.4% |
| 2010 | 3,252 | | −9.3% |
| 2020 | 3,455 | | 6.2% |
U.S. Decennial Census

=== 2020 census ===
As of the 2020 census, Winnsboro had a population of 3,455. The median age was 41.5 years; 23.5% of the residents were under 18 and 24.3% were 65 or older. For every 100 females, there were 86.0 males, and for every 100 females 18 and over, there were 80.8 males 18 and over.

Of the 1,467 households in Winnsboro, 30.2% had children under 18 living in them, 37.3% were married-couple households, 18.3% were households with a male householder and no spouse or partner present, and 37.9% were households with a female householder and no spouse or partner present. About 38.0% of all households were made up of individuals, and 21.5% had someone living alone who was 65 or older. The census also counted 677 families residing in the city.

The city had 1,662 housing units, of which 11.7% were vacant. The homeowner vacancy rate was 1.2% and the rental vacancy rate was 8.9%.

None of the residents lived in urban areas, while 100.0% lived in rural areas.

Racial composition as of the 2020 census
| Race | Number | Percentage |
|---|---|---|
| White | 2,749 | 79.6% |
| Black or African American | 124 | 3.6% |
| American Indian and Alaska Native | 39 | 1.1% |
| Asian | 29 | 0.8% |
| Some other race | 166 | 4.8% |
| Two or more races | 348 | 10.1% |
| Hispanic or Latino (of any race) | 422 | 12.2% |

=== 2010 census ===
As of the census of 2010, 3,584 people, 1,300 households, and 813 families resided in the city. The population density was 973.9 inhabitants per square mile (376.0/km^{2}). The 1,491 housing units had an average density of 405.1 per square mile (156.4/km^{2}). The racial makeup of the city was 85.71% White, 8.90% African American, 0.75% Native American, 0.64% Asian, 0.11% Pacific Islander, 2.73% from other races, and 1.14% from two or more races. Hispanics or Latinos of any race were 4.8% of the population.

Of the 1,300 households, 26.5% had children under 18 living with them, 46.9% were married couples living together, 11.8% had a female householder with no husband present, and 37.4% were not families. About 34.8% of all households were made up of individuals, and 23.4% had someone living alone who was 65 or older. The average household size was 2.26, and the average family size was 2.91.

In the city, the age distribution was 19.9% under 18, 10.8% from 18 to 24, 26.5% from 25 to 44, 18.6% from 45 to 64, and 24.2% who were 65 or older. The median age was 39 years. For every 100 females, there were 108.1 males. For every 100 females 18 and over, there were 109.6 males.

The median income in the city for a household was $25,690 and for a family was $37,286. Males had a median income of $25,972 versus $18,036 for females. The per capita income for the city was $15,612. About 11.3% of families and 14.7% of the population were below the poverty line, including 16.6% of those under 18 and 15.3% of those 65 or over.

== Education ==
The city is served by the Winnsboro Independent School District.

== Library ==
Gilbreath Memorial Library is located at 916 N. Main Street. The library is a public Tri-County library serving Franklin, Hopkins, and Wood Counties.

== Media ==
The city is served by the newspaper Wood County Monitor.

== Local Government ==
The City is a Texas General Law type A city and has a mayor/council - city administrator form of government. The current mayor as of May 2025 is Richard Parrish.

== See also ==
- List of cities in Texas
- Lake Winnsboro
