= Quitman, Texas =

- City
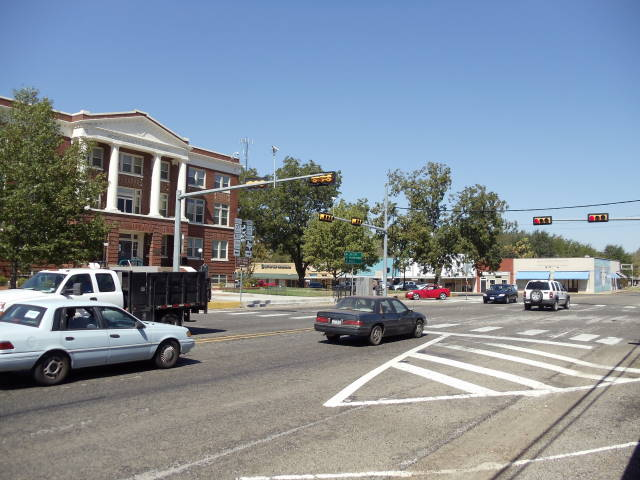
- Quitman Town Square

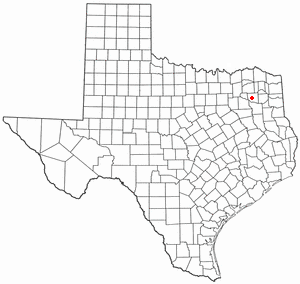
- Location of Quitman, Texas

- Location in Texas Quitman (the United States) Quitman (North America)
- Coordinates: 32°47′43″N 95°26′37″W
- Country: United States
- State: Texas
- County: Wood
- Founded: 1850
- Incorporated: 1941
- Named for: John A. Quitman

Government
  - Type: Mayor–council government

Area
  - Total: 1.886 sq mi (4.885 km^{2})
  - Land: 1.877 sq mi (4.862 km^{2})
  - Water: 0.0089 sq mi (0.023 km^{2})
- Elevation: 400 ft (120 m)

Population (2020)
  - Total: 1,942
  - Density: 1,035/sq mi (399.4/km^{2})
- Time zone: UTC−06:00 (CST)
  - Summer (DST): UTC−05:00 (CDT)
- ZIP code: 75783
- Area codes: 903, 430
- FIPS code: 48-60188
- GNIS feature ID: 2411510
- Website: Official website

Quitman is a city and the county seat of Wood County, Texas, United States. Its population was 1,942 at the 2020 census. The city was named for John A. Quitman, a veteran of the Mexican–American War, and once governor of Mississippi.

== Geography ==
According to the United States Census Bureau, the city has a total area of 1.886 sq mi (4.88 km^{2}).

=== Climate ===
The climate in this area is characterized by hot, humid summers and generally mild to cool winters. According to the Köppen climate classification, Quitman has a humid subtropical climate, Cfa on climate maps.

== Government ==
Quitman operates under a mayor-council form of government in which the mayor is the head. The mayor, with advice from the council, hires a professional administrator who oversees the day-to-day operation of the city.

== Demographics ==
Historical population
Census	Pop.	Note	%±
1870	320		—
1880	151		−52.8%
1930	368		—
1950	927		—
1960	1,237		33.4%
1970	1,494		20.8%
1980	1,893		26.7%
1990	1,684		−11.0%
2000	2,030		20.5%
2010	1,809		−10.9%
2020	1,942		7.4%
U.S. Decennial Census

=== 2020 census ===
As of the 2020 census, there were 1,942 people, 824 households, and 559 families residing in the city. The median age was 41.0 years, 22.1% of residents were under the age of 18, and 25.3% of residents were 65 years of age or older. For every 100 females there were 88.7 males, and for every 100 females age 18 and over there were 86.2 males age 18 and over.

0.0% of residents lived in urban areas, while 100.0% lived in rural areas.

Of the 824 households, 29.6% had children under the age of 18 living in them. Of all households, 40.8% were married-couple households, 17.9% were households with a male householder and no spouse or partner present, and 36.7% were households with a female householder and no spouse or partner present. About 34.9% of all households were made up of individuals and 23.6% had someone living alone who was 65 years of age or older.

There were 864 housing units, of which 11.0% were vacant. The homeowner vacancy rate was 2.4% and the rental vacancy rate was 6.4%.

Racial composition as of the 2020 census
Race	Number	Percent
White	1,639	84.4%
Black or African American	86	4.4%
American Indian and Alaska Native	8	0.4%
Asian	17	0.9%
Native Hawaiian and Other Pacific Islander	2	0.1%
Some other race	54	2.8%
Two or more races	136	7.0%
Hispanic or Latino (of any race)	137	7.1%

=== 2010 census ===
At the 2010 census, 1,809 people were in 775 households, including 509 families, in the city. The population density was 959.0 inhabitants per square mile (370.27/km^{2}). The 874 housing units averaged 475.1 per square mile (183.4/km^{2}). The racial makeup of the city was 90.05% White, 6.4% African American, 0.39% Native American, 0.49% Asian, 1.63% from other races, and 1.03% from two or more races. Hispanics or Latinos of any race were 3.3%.

Of the 775 households, 28.1% had children under 18 living with them, 50.5% were married couples living together, 13.3% had a female householder with no husband present, and 34.2% were not families. About 32.0% of households were one person, and 23.6% were one person aged 65 or older. The average household size was 2.32, and the average family size was 2.91.

The age distribution was 22.1% under the age of 18, 6.0% from 18 to 24, 24.2% from 25 to 44, 18.8% from 45 to 64, and 29.0% 65 or older. The median age was 43 years. For every 100 females, there were 86.1 males. For every 100 females age 18 and over, there were 77.4 males.

The median household income was US$31,607 and the median family income was US$39,643. Males had a median income of US$28,929 versus US$25,060 for females. The per capita income for the city was US$17,831. About 9.2% of families and 11.3% of the population were below the poverty line, including 12.6% of those under age 18 and 12.8% of those age 65 or over.

== Education ==
The City of Quitman is served by the Quitman Independent School District, a University Interscholastic League (UIL) class-3A school district. Recently, the school has produced a state championship in golf, UIL news writing, and powerlifting, and received first runner-up at the 2011 state UIL one-act play contest.

=== Public Library ===
The Quitman Public Library is located at 202 East Goode Street, one block east of the Wood County Courthouse. The library was formed in 1975 when a group of citizens gathered to study the need for a public library that would serve Quitman and the surrounding community. The Quitman City Council chartered the library in 1975. The library's first building was in a frame house offered by the Liles family located at the corner of Main and Lane Streets near the courthouse square.

In August 1980, a financial drive began to purchase a larger building to house the many books that had been collected from donations. The community supported the drive, and the former facility of the First National Bank, at 202 East Goode Street, Quitman, was purchased. In early 1987, a local fundraising effort was started for additional space in the library to accommodate a children's department, a staff book-processing area, and a community meeting room. The library received several grants, and in October 1988, the Thurman Shamburger Wing was dedicated.

Today, the Quitman Public Library is fully staffed and houses a collection of nearly 30,000 items in a variety of formats; the library also houses the collection of the Wood County Genealogical Society. The library has an advisory board and active Friends of the Library group.

The mayor of Quitman and the Quitman city council are the governing body of the Quitman Public Library as it is a department of the city government.

== Notable people ==
- Will Hogg, Houston attorney, philanthropist, and founder of River Oaks, Houston
- Bryan Hughes, American politician, Texas State Senator for District 1
- Thomas Morrow Reavley, senior judge of the United States Court of Appeals for the Fifth Circuit
- Sissy Spacek, prolific actress who won an Academy Award in the 1980 film Coal Miner's Daughter
