= Robinson House =

Robinson House may refer to:

- Judge Elisha Robinson House, Ashville, Alabama
- John Robinson House, Huntsville, Alabama
- Mrs. William Robinson House, Huntsville, Alabama
- Collins-Robinson House, Mobile, Alabama
- Chambers-Robinson House, Sheffield, Alabama
- Dr. Robinson House, Leslie, Arkansas
- Joseph Taylor Robinson House, Little Rock, Arkansas
- Pearson-Robinson House, Little Rock, Arkansas
- Virginia Robinson Estate, Beverly Hills, California
- Elias H. Robinson House, Santa Cruz, California, listed on the National Register of Historic Places
- Robinson House (Denver, Colorado), listed on the National Register of Historic Places
- Robinson House (Louisville, Colorado)
- Robinson House (Claymont, Delaware)
- Jesse Robinson House (Seaford, Delaware)
- Robinson-Stewart House, Carmi, Illinois
- Robinson House (Maywood, Illinois)
- William Robinson House (Sycamore, Illinois)
- Horney Robinson House, Fort Wayne, Indiana
- Allison-Robinson House, Spencer, Indiana
- Sage-Robinson-Nagel House, Terre Haute, Indiana
- James Robinson House (Mitchellsburg, Kentucky), listed on the National Register of Historic Places
- Robinson Hall-Louisiana Tech University, Ruston, Louisiana, listed on the National Register of Historic Places
- William A. Robinson House, Auburn, Maine
- Edwin Arlington Robinson House, Gardiner, Maine
- Robinson-Parsons Farm, Paris, Maine
- Seavey-Robinson House, South Portland, Maine
- Robinson House (Severna Park, Maryland)
- Robinson-Lewis-G. F. Fessenden House, Arlington, Massachusetts
- Robinson House (Arlington, Massachusetts)
- Capt. Joel Robinson House, Attleboro, Massachusetts
- Robinson House (Williamstown, Massachusetts), listed on the National Register of Historic Places
- Robinson House (Muir, Michigan), listed on the National Register of Historic Places
- Leonard Robinson House, Sauk Rapids, Minnesota, listed on the National Register of Historic Places
- George R. and Elsie Robinson House, Kirkwood, Missouri, listed on the National Register of Historic Places
- William P. Robinson House, Lexington, Missouri
- Lizzie Robinson House, North Omaha, Nebraska
- J. C. Robinson House, Waterloo, Nebraska, listed on the National Register of Historic Places
- John Roosevelt "Jackie" Robinson House, New York, New York
- Robinson Rock House Ruin and Plantation Site, Charlotte, North Carolina
- Col. William H. Robinson House, Mayville, North Dakota
- Byron W. Robinson House, Akron, Ohio, listed on the National Register of Historic Places
- Edmund Robinson House, Lebanon, Ohio, listed on the National Register of Historic Places
- Robinson-Pavey House, Washington Court House, Ohio
- Spies–Robinson House, Portland, Oregon
- Jesse Robinson House (Wellsboro, Pennsylvania)
- Robinson House (Wellsboro, Pennsylvania)
- Robinson-Hiller House, Chapin, South Carolina
- Robinson-Macken House, Austin, Texas
- Florence Robinson Cottage, Hawkins, Texas
- Daniel Webster Robinson House, Burlington, Vermont
- James E. Robinson House, Beaver, Utah, listed on the National Register of Historic Places
- William Robinson House (300 West, Beaver, Utah), listed on the National Register of Historic Places
- William Robinson House (State Route 153, Beaver, Utah), listed on the National Register of Historic Places
- Robinson House (Richmond, Virginia)
- Robinson House (Manassas, Virginia)
- Hedges-Robinson-Myers House, Hedgesville, West Virginia
- Robinson-Tabb House, Martinsburg, West Virginia
- Charles Robinson House, Greenbush, Wisconsin

== See also ==
- James Robinson House (disambiguation)
- Jesse Robinson House (disambiguation)
- William Robinson House (disambiguation)
