= Jesse Robinson House =

Jesse Robinson House may refer to two houses listed on the National Register of Historic Places of the United States:

- Jesse Robinson House (Seaford, Delaware), a mix of Greek Revival and Italianate styles
- Jesse Robinson House (Wellsboro, Pennsylvania), Queen Anne style

== See also ==
- Robinson House (disambiguation)
