= William Robinson House =

William Robinson House may refer to:

- William Robinson House (Sycamore, Illinois), a contributing property
- William A. Robinson House, Auburn, Maine, listed on the NRHP in Androscoggin County, Maine
- William P. Robinson House, Lexington, Missouri, listed on the NRHP in Lafayette County, Missouri
- William Robinson House (300 West, Beaver, Utah), listed on the NRHP in Beaver County, Utah
- William Robinson House (State Route 153, Beaver, Utah), listed on the NRHP in Beaver County, Utah

== See also ==
- Robinson House (disambiguation)
