= Oak Place (Huntsville, Alabama) =

Historic house in Alabama, United States

- Steele-Fowler House
- U.S. National Register of Historic Places
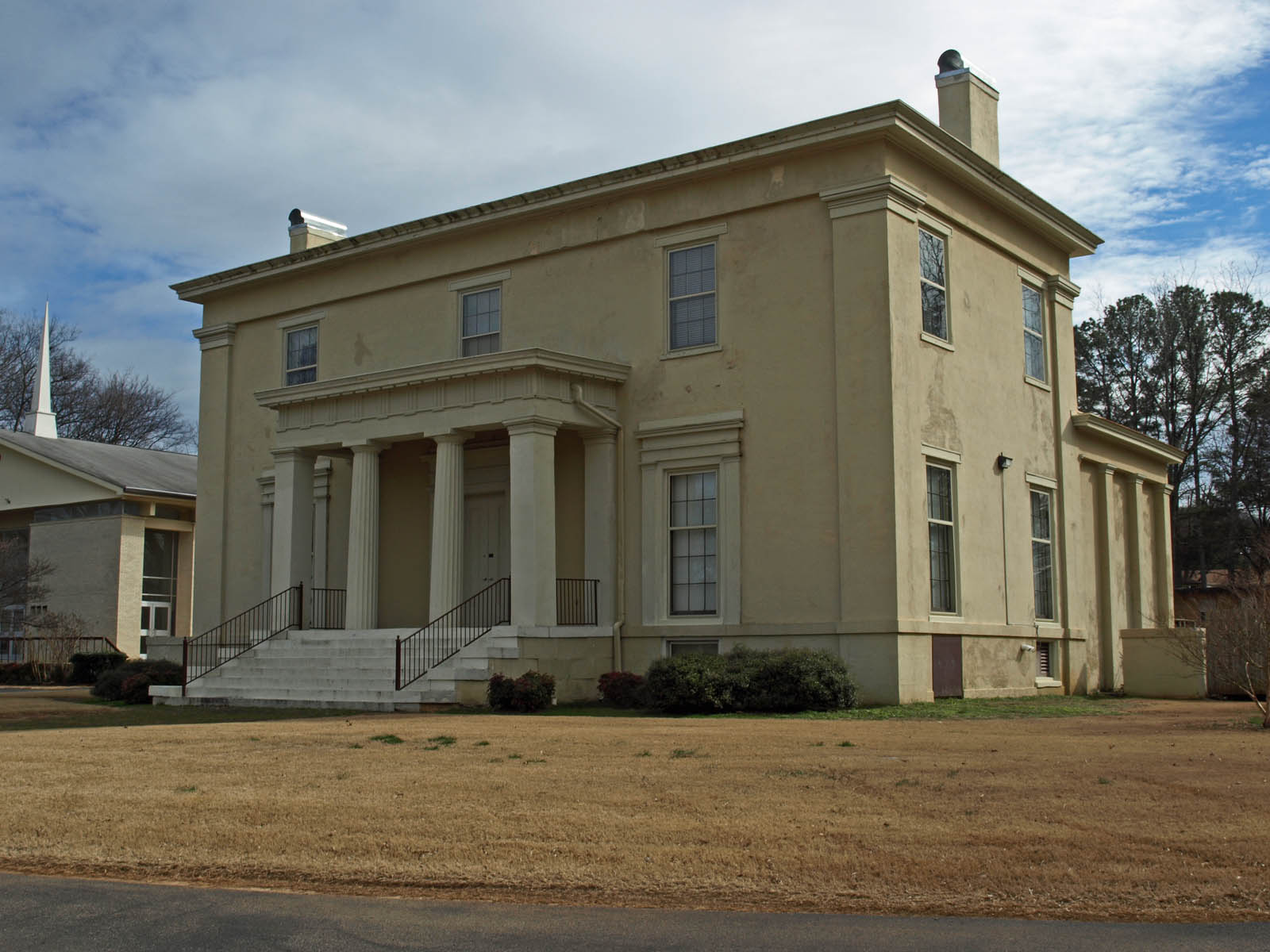
- The house in February 2012

- Location within Huntsville, Alabama Location within Alabama Location within the United States
- Location: 808 Maysville Rd., Huntsville, Alabama
- Coordinates: 34°44′40″N 86°33′52″W
- Area: less than one acre
- Built: 1840
- Architect: George Steele
- Architectural style: Greek Revival
- NRHP reference No.: 74000422
- Added to NRHP: June 20, 1974

Oak Place (also known as the Steele-Fowler House) is a historic residence in Huntsville, Alabama. It was built by renowned Huntsville architect George Steele in 1840 on 320 acres (130 ha). Steele designed a number of buildings across the South, including the First National Bank building in Huntsville, and the second Madison County Courthouse, which stood from 1840 until 1914. Similar to many of his buildings, Steele designed the Oak Place house in a Greek Revival style, although much more restrained in detail.

The house has a low hipped roof, and is three stories, although it appears as two stories with a basement due to its unusual interior layout. The façade has three steps leading to a one-story, flat-roofed portico supported by two square Doric columns on the corners and two fluted Doric columns in the middle. The entablature is the most decorated part of the house, although it is limited to groups of vertical strakes. Windows flanking the portico are six-over-nine sashes surrounded by square pilasters and Doric capitals with plain entablature and cornice. The interior layout was different than the standard home of the day. It features a central entrance hall, with a large ballroom with 14-foot (4.2-m) ceilings to one side, and two smaller rooms several steps above on the other. In the basement below the two smaller rooms is a dining room, taking advantage of the higher ceiling. There are four bedrooms on the second floor. Like the exterior, the interior was restrained.

Many details were lost when it was converted from a house to a church school building by the East Huntsville Baptist Church. The house was listed on the National Register of Historic Places in 1974.
