= James Robinson House =

James Robinson House may refer to:

- Robinson House (Manassas, Virginia), built by and for a James Robinson, part of the Manassas National Battlefield Park
- James Robinson House (Mitchellsburg, Kentucky), a National Register of Historic Places listing in Boyle County, Kentucky
- James E. Robinson House, a National Register of Historic Places listing in Beaver County, Utah

== See also ==
- Robinson House (disambiguation)
