= Osborn Site =

Osborn Site may refer to:

- Osborn Site (Bloomfield, Indiana), listed on the National Register of Historic Places in Greene County, Indiana
- Osborn Site (Quitman, Texas), listed on the National Register of Historic Places in Wood County, Texas
