= George Gilliam Steele =

American architect (1798–1855)

- Born: April 1, 1798; Bedford County, Virginia, US
- Died: October 21, 1855 (aged 57)
- Occupation: Architect

George Gilliam Steele Sr. (April 1, 1798 – October 21, 1855) was an American architect in Huntsville, Alabama.

== Early and family life ==
Steele was born April 1, 1798, in Bedford County, Virginia. Around 1818, he moved from his home in Virginia to Huntsville, Alabama. In December 1823, he married Eliza Ann Weaver (1808–1891), with whom he had eight children. One of his sons, Matthew W. Steele became an architect as well. It is not clear whether George or Matthew designed Quietdale. Another son, Colonel Johnathan Steele was a civil engineer.

== Career ==
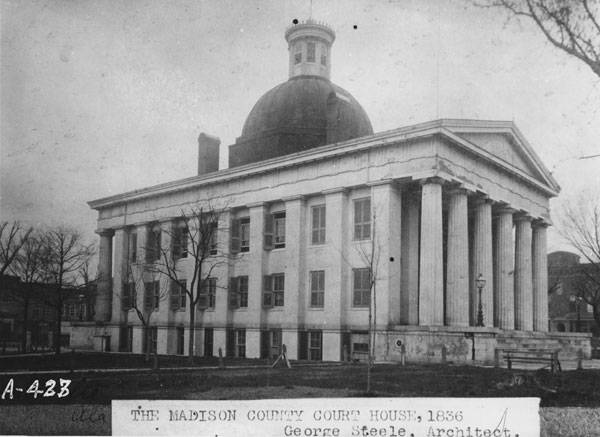
1835 Madison County Courthouse, photographed 1907

Steele began his architectural career as a builder and constructed his own house in 1824. Initially self taught, he attended architecture lectures in New York.

Over the course of his career, Steele designed several major buildings in the city. Several were demolished in the 1960s as city leaders sought to modernize and accommodate aerospace industry.

Much of the labor involved in building Steele's designs was done by slaves. He owned 74 slaves at the time of his death, many of whom were trained in construction. He would rent more slaves if a job required it. If slaves could not be found, he contracted work out to white tradesmen.

Steele died on October 21, 1855, aged 57, and was buried in Maple Hill Cemetery.

== Selected works ==
- Former Madison County Courthouse, demolished c. 1914
- First National Bank
- Oak Place (1840)
- Huntsville Female College, destroyed by fire in 1895
