= Marcus DeWitt Carlock House =

- U.S. National Register of Historic Places
- Recorded Texas Historic Landmark
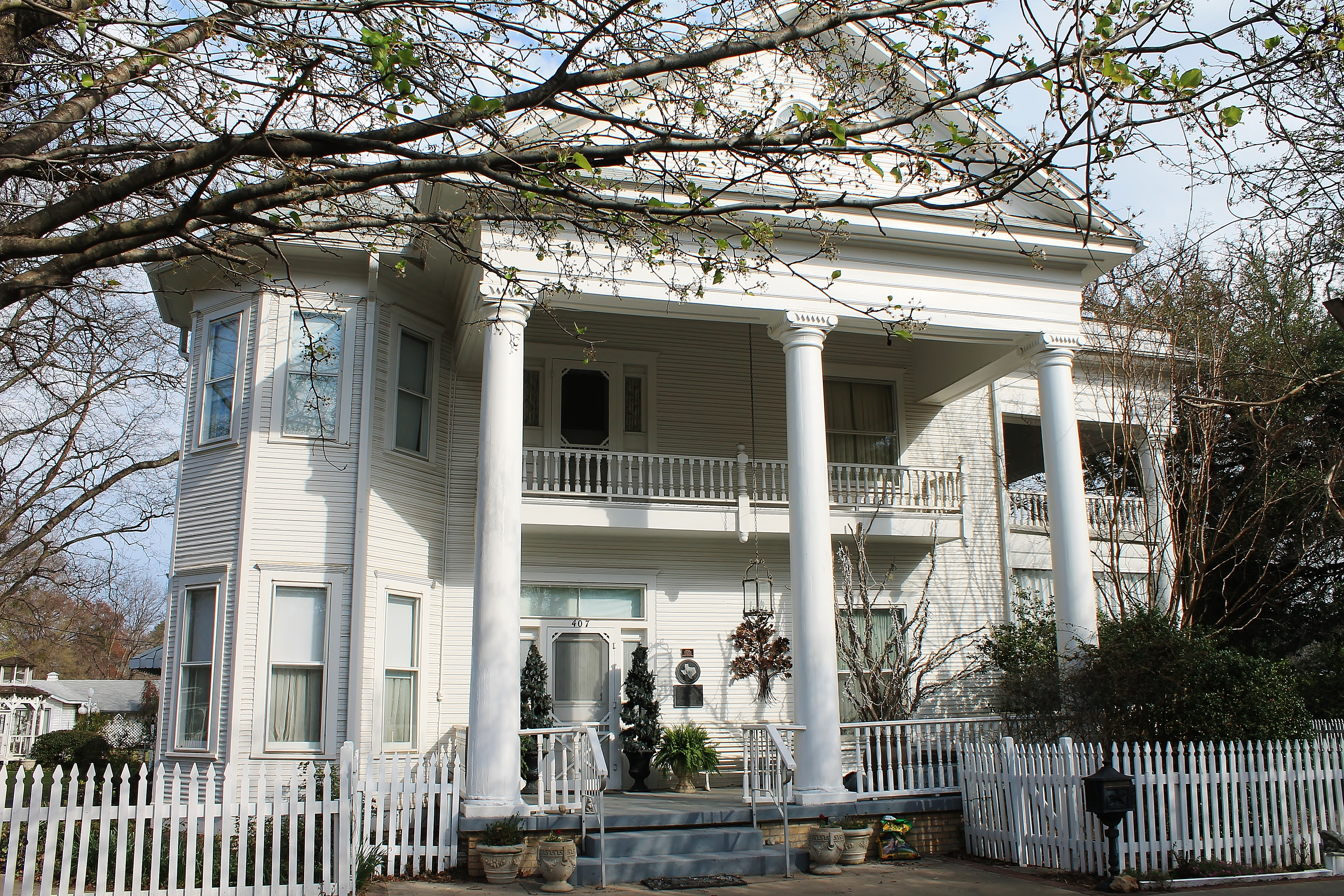
- Marcus DeWitt Carlock House

- Location within Texas Location within the United States
- Location: 407 S. Main St., Winnsboro, Texas
- Coordinates: 32°57′13″N 95°17′29″W
- Area: 1.2 acres (0.49 ha)
- Built: 1903
- Built by: Jeff Frazier, Marcus DeWitt Carlock
- Architectural style: Classical Revival
- NRHP reference No.: 13000277
- RTHL No.: 8949

Significant dates
- Added to NRHP: May 14, 2013
- Designated RTHL: 1966

The Marcus DeWitt Carlock House is a house with Neoclassical and late-Victorian architectural characteristics that is listed on the National Register of Historic Places and as a Recorded Texas Historic Landmark located at 407 South Main Street, approximately three blocks south of downtown, in Winnsboro, Wood County, Texas. It was the first National Register of Historic Places listing in the city of Winnsboro.

It was included on the National Register of Historic Places in 2013. It was designated a Recorded Texas Historic Landmark in 1966.

== Architecture and construction ==
The Marcus DeWitt Carlock House is next door to the Winnsboro City Hall in a mixed commercial/residential area. The front facade of the home faces the west and the house sits behind a white picket fence. The home has large, distinctive columns and a second-story balcony overlooking the home's front porch.

The home is in the Neoclassical style with asymmetrical massing that is common of large, late Victorian residential construction. The home is constructed on a pier and beam foundation consisting of 56 large brick piers. The home contains 53 windows, balconies on the front and side, six columns, and four covered porches. The home was constructed of heart and curly pine that was personally selected by Marcus DeWitt Carlock. The lumber was milled in a lumber mill in which Carlock held ownership interest.

The house, absent the brick foundation, is painted white and has been white throughout the home's existence.

=== Interior ===
The interior included 17 rooms when constructed and a curly pine staircase as well as a wood-burning fireplace in the entryway.

== History of the Home ==
The Marcus DeWitt Carlock house was originally built in 1903. The architect is not known. The original Carlock homestead area included over 20 acres with several outbuildings including a woodhouse, smokehouse, surrey house, greenhouse, servant's quarters, and similar exterior buildings. Parcels of the land were sold over time as residential neighborhoods transposed most of the original homestead. The remaining homestead is a little over two acres and contains the home itself and the shell of the old carriage house, which has been renovated and re-adapted as an apartment.

Following the death of Marcus DeWitt Carlock in 1931 and the death of his wife, Anna Lee Carlock, in 1934, the home was willed to Marcus DeWitt Carlock, Jr., and his half-sister, Isabel Carlock Ragley. Marcus DeWitt, Jr., later bought out his sister's share of the home. In 1947, it became his permanent home. He opened a law practice in Winnsboro and was a local civic leader.

The home remained in the Carlock family until 1996. In 1996, the home was purchased by Norma Wilkinson, at the request of Rhea Carlock, the last heir living in the home. Wilkinson purchased the home on the condition it could be made into a bead and breakfast. The restored home is a bed and breakfast operated as Oaklea Mansion.

== Marcus De Witt Carlock & Carlock Family ==
Marcus De Witt Carlock was a prominent businessman, lawyer, and politician. He was born in Hempstead County, Arkansas, on December 3, 1853. He and his family moved to Texas at the beginning of the American Civil War. As a young child, Carlock followed his father in to various battles, and was present at the battle of Elk Horn/Pea Ridge. Separated from his father after the battle, he never again saw his father. His father, Samuel, died while captive on a Union POW ship following the Battle of Fort Donaldson.

He continued to serve as a messenger in the Army of the Confederacy, and carried dispatches 24 miles daily from one army post to another until the war concluded and the Confederate States of America surrendered.

Following the war in 1865, the family moved to Pittsburg, Texas (east of Winnsboro) in Camp County, where Carlock enrolled in school. He studied law and was admitted to the bar in April 1879. In 1890, he was appointed as a census enumerator for Camp County.

After the 1881 Census, he moved with his brother, who later served as the town's mayor, to Winnsboro. He was appointed the Precinct 4 Justice of the Peace and, for 14 months, held this office while establishing his private law practice. He had a practice of holding court on the front porch of his grocery store in downtown Winnsboro. Carlock owned interests in a number of businesses in the town including the Schulter-Whiteman Lumber Company, the lumber mill that milled the lumber used in the construction of the home.

A Democrat, Carlock served as State Executive Committeeman for the Democratic Party of Texas for four years, and was a friend and supporter of Texas Governor James Hogg, from nearby Quitman.

Carlock organized and commanded a company called the "Jim Hogg Rifles," in the Texas State guard in 1888. He served as a presidential elector for the Third Congressional District of Texas and cast that district's vote for Woodrow Wilson in Washington, D.C., in 1912.

At the onset of World War I, Carlock offered to form a cavalry company, but was denied due to his age. Instead, he became involved in the formation of the Council of National Defense and served on that body's legal advisory board. He was credited with capturing 1,800 volumes of alleged German propaganda that was found circulating in the American South. His son, Marcus DeWitt Carlock, Jr., was also a lawyer and noted Winnsboro civic leader.

== See also ==
- National Register of Historic Places listings in Wood County, Texas
- Recorded Texas Historic Landmarks in Wood County
