= Howard L. and Vivian W. Lott House =

- U.S. National Register of Historic Places
- Recorded Texas Historic Landmark
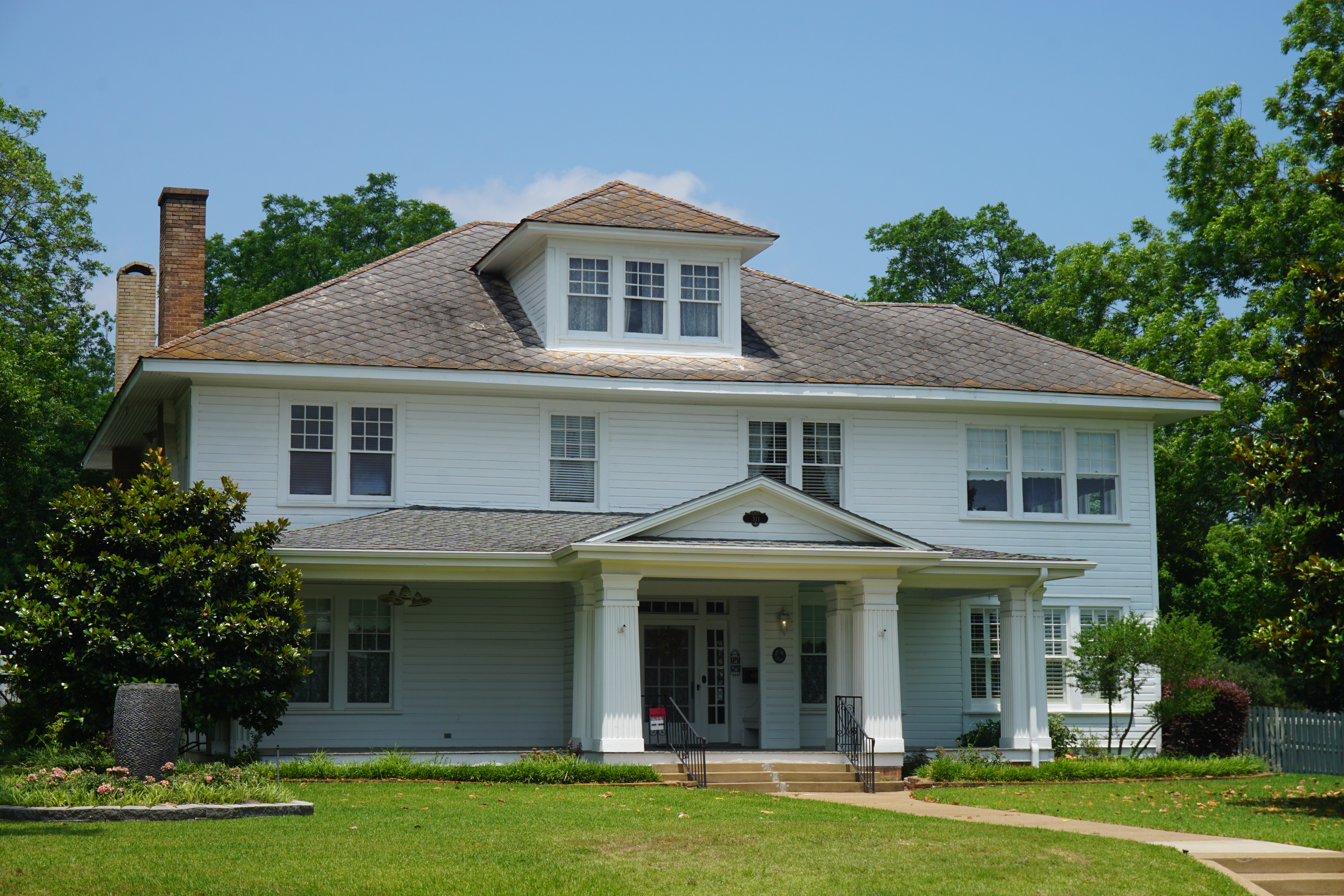
- Howard L. and Vivian W. Lott House

- Location within Texas Location within the United States
- Location: 311 E. Kilpatrick St., Mineola, Texas
- Coordinates: 32°39′50″N 95°29′9″W
- Area: less than one acre
- Built: 1918
- Architect: J. J. McLeon
- Architectural style: Prairie School
- NRHP reference No.: 98001185
- RTHL No.: 8976

Significant dates
- Added to NRHP: October 9, 1998
- Designated RTHL: 1996

The Howard L. and Vivian W. Lott House located at 311 East Kilpatrick Street in Mineola, Wood County, Texas, is a house designed in the Prairie School style with classical details. It is a Recorded Texas Historic Landmark and is listed on the National Register of Historic Places.

== History ==
The house was designed by architect J. J. McLeon for Angus and Lena Beaird. Construction began in 1918 and was completed in the early 1920s. The Beaird family sold the home to Howard and Vivian Lott in 1928.

The house was named a Recorded Texas Historic Landmark in 1996 and was added to the National Register of Historic Places in 1998.

== See also ==
- National Register of Historic Places listings in Wood County, Texas
- Recorded Texas Historic Landmarks in Wood County
