= Gentleman Jim Robinson =

James "Gentleman Jim" Robinson
- Born: October 6, 1799; Pittsylvania Plantation, Bull Run, Virginia
- Died: October 15, 1875 (aged 76); Robinson House (Manassas, Virginia), Bull Run, Virginia
- Occupations: Entrepreneur, businessman, farmer, landowner
- Spouse: Susan Gaskins
- Children: Jemimi, Alfred, Tasco, Sr., Henrietta, Bladen, Diana, Pascal, James, Jr.
- Parent(s): Landon Carter, Jr. and Susanna of Pittsylvania Plantation, Virginia

James Robinson (October 6, 1799 – October 15, 1875), known as Gentleman Jim, was born on the Pittsylvania Plantation of Landon Carter, Jr. to a freewoman by the name of Susan aka "Annah". He first rose to prominence as one of the wealthiest African Americans in the Manassas area, but is also known because his homestead was located between the lines of the Confederate and Union armies during two major battles of the Civil War.

== Biography ==
James Robinson aka "Gentleman Jim," was born free and landed. He also received an education from the same private tutor that taught his half sister Judith Carter. The homestead he built in Bull Run couldn't have been more prominent at the outset of the Civil War, during which two major battles were fought in his front yard.

All of the above would have been enough to make him noteworthy; however "Gentleman Jim," was to become the 3rd richest African freedman through much of his own initiative. Using the privileges that came with being a freedman, which were quite limited in 18th century Virginia, James Robinson used the education he received from his teacher James Robinson, whose name it is believed he later took for himself, and combined that with hard work and an entrepreneurial spirit to acquire 1500 acres of land by the time of his death in 1875.

The Robinson family history indicates Landon Carter, Jr. (1738 – 1801) was his father, which seems quite likely due to the special status that both he and his mother held on the plantation.

== Land ownership ==
Gentleman Jim was unusual in a number of ways, including his ownership of land from birth. Researchers have surmised that in order for Jim to own land from birth, by law, he would have to be free from birth. Furthermore, in order for him to be free from birth, his mother would have to be free, as well. They come to the extraordinary conclusion that Landon Carter, Jr. must have freed this enslaved African woman, in order for their son to be free and enjoy whatever benefits would accrue from that freedom in the still limited world of the African freedmen. They continue on to say that this was not as unusual as one would think, because at this period in history numerous Africans were being freed, due to a low work load, somewhat akin to today's layoffs.

The Robinson House was located in the middle of the battlefield where the first and second Battles of Bull Run occurred. The family was forced to evacuate to another house in the area, while Jim took cover under the bridge over Young's Branch of the Bull Run River.

== Marriage and children ==
Starting a family was fraught with difficulties during these times, especially in the case of black people. As a freedman there were some things that "Gentleman Jim" could not avoid. When he "married" Susan "Sukey" Gaskins (c. 1823'), due to her slave status they could not obtain a marriage license, which prevented them from having their relationship legally recognized.

They were still able to raise eight children together, but they did suffer some setbacks. For instance, he was able to purchase his wife and some of their children (and thus grant them their freedom) prior to the onset of the Civil War, but there were two sons that were sold "down the river." James, Jr. and Alfred were both sold to a new owner in New Orleans. Alfred returned some time later, but James, Jr. never returned.

Below is a list of children with birth and death dates that have been verified by a team of researchers who compared Prince William County records; oral history from the Robinson family and records found in the vandalized house.

- Jemima (born: 1817 - died: 1914)
- James, Jr. (born: circa 1822)
- Alfred (born: 3/15/1828 on the John Lee Plantation @ Willow Green; died: 1904 at the Robinson House).
- Tasco, Sr. (born: 1829)
- Henrietta (born: June 1840)
- Bladen (born: May 1843)
- Diana (born: 1843)
- Pascal (born: 1855)

== Descendants ==
- Edward W. Crosby
- Carl Stokes
- Louis Stokes
- Rick James
- Steve Harvey

== Notes ==
- James Robinson's children were Bladen, James Jr., Tasco, Jermima, Alfred and Henrietta. Pendleton and Dianah were Jermima's children; father unknown
