= Severna Park, Maryland =

- Census-designated place
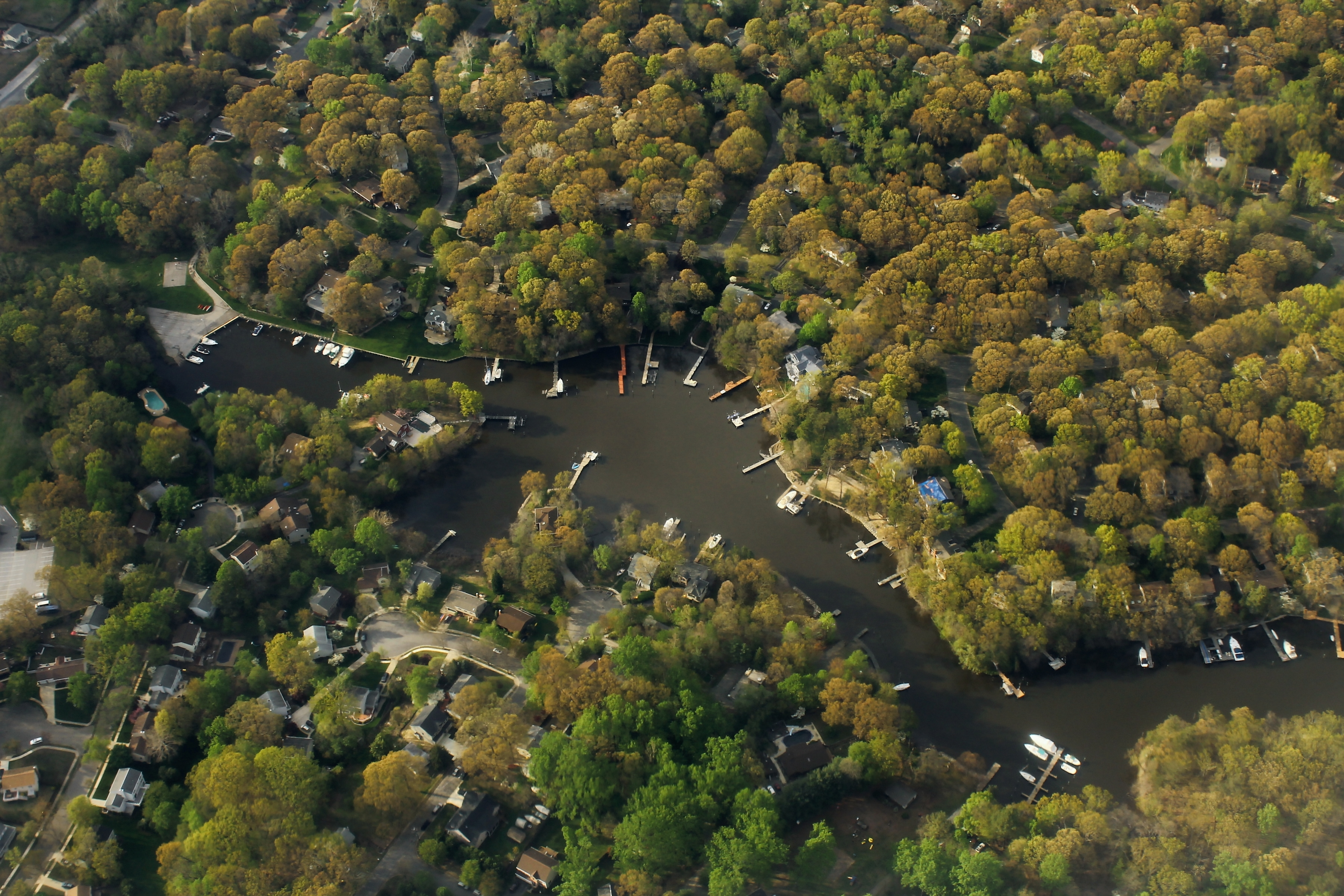
- Aerial view of the Magothy River in Severna Park
- Nicknames: "The Park", "SP"
- Location of Severna Park, Maryland
- Coordinates: 39°4′56″N 76°33′56″W
- Country: United States
- State: Maryland
- County: Anne Arundel

Area
  - Total: 19.29 sq mi (49.96 km^{2})
  - Land: 16.53 sq mi (42.82 km^{2})
  - Water: 2.76 sq mi (7.15 km^{2})
- Elevation: 39 ft (12 m)

Population (2020)
  - Total: 39,933
  - Density: 2,415.5/sq mi (932.64/km^{2})
- Time zone: UTC−5 (Eastern (EST))
  - Summer (DST): UTC−4 (EDT)
- ZIP code: 21146
- Area codes: 410, 443, and 667
- FIPS code: 24-71200
- GNIS feature ID: 0591251

Severna Park is a census-designated place (CDP) in Anne Arundel County, Maryland, United States. Severna Park is part of the Baltimore-Washington Metropolitan Area, and is located approximately 8 miles (13 km) north of Annapolis, 17 miles (27 km) south of Baltimore and 39 miles (63 km) east of Washington, D.C. Severna Park's population was 39,933 at the 2020 census.

== History ==
The name Severna Park is rumored to originate from a 1906 contest held by Oscar Hatton while the modern community was first becoming established. The winner would receive a portion of land but controversy arose because the winner was an African-American woman, who was instead rewarded $500. However, extensive research by local historian Nelson Molter found no corroborative evidence for this story, suggesting the naming contest is merely a local myth.

Robinson House was listed on the National Register of Historic Places in 2009. Severna Park was originally named "Boone," and was a stop along the Baltimore and Annapolis Railroad, which was converted to the B&A Rail Trail in 1990. Severna Park is also home to Severn School, a private high school established in 1914 by Rolland Teel as a feeder school to the United States Naval Academy, as well as several other old homes and buildings.

== Geography and transportation ==
Severna Park is located at 39°4′56″N 76°33′56″W (39.082109, −76.565656), between the eastern shore of the Severn River and northwestern shore of the Magothy River, approximately 17 miles (27 km) south of Baltimore and 39 miles (63 km) east of Washington, D.C. It is bordered to the north by Pasadena, to the east (across the Magothy River) by Lake Shore, to the southeast by Arnold, to the southwest (across the Severn River) by Herald Harbor and Arden on the Severn, and to the west by Gambrills and Millersville.

Severna Park is split by Ritchie Highway (Maryland Route 2), which runs between Baltimore and Annapolis and directly through Severna Park, serving as one of the main thoroughfares in the area. Other main roads include Benfield Road and Baltimore-Annapolis Boulevard (Maryland Route 648). Interstate 97 runs from Annapolis to Baltimore directly west of Severna Park, passing through Millersville. Severna Park is accessible from I-97 via exit 10 to Benfield Boulevard/Veterans Highway.

Severna Park is served by the Maryland Transit Administration's Route 70. A large portion of the Baltimore & Annapolis Trail also runs through Severna Park. The trail, which is now a bike trail, was originally a rail trail before being converted as part of the East Coast Greenway in 1996. The trail's headquarters are located on Earleigh Heights Road in Severna Park.

According to the United States Census Bureau, Severna Park has a total area of 19.3 square miles (50.1 km^{2}), of which 16.5 square miles (42.7 km^{2}) is land and 2.9 square miles (7.4 km^{2}), or 14.76%, is water.

== Demographics ==
Historical population
Census	Pop.	Note	%±
2000	28,507		—
2010	37,634		32.0%
2020	39,933		6.1%
U.S. Decennial Census

=== 2020 census ===
As of the 2020 census, Severna Park had a population of 39,933. The median age was 42.3 years. 25.5% of residents were under the age of 18 and 18.1% were 65 years of age or older. For every 100 females there were 96.2 males, and for every 100 females age 18 and over there were 93.4 males age 18 and over.

100.0% of residents lived in urban areas, while 0.0% lived in rural areas.

There were 13,564 households in Severna Park, of which 40.0% had children under the age of 18 living in them. Of all households, 69.1% were married-couple households, 9.9% were households with a male householder and no spouse or partner present, and 17.4% were households with a female householder and no spouse or partner present. About 15.8% of all households were made up of individuals and 10.1% had someone living alone who was 65 years of age or older.

There were 14,097 housing units, of which 3.8% were vacant. The homeowner vacancy rate was 0.9% and the rental vacancy rate was 7.9%.

Racial composition as of the 2020 census
Race	Number	Percent
White	33,686	84.4%
Black or African American	1,566	3.9%
American Indian and Alaska Native	46	0.1%
Asian	1,444	3.6%
Native Hawaiian and Other Pacific Islander	13	0.0%
Some other race	429	1.1%
Two or more races	2,749	6.9%
Hispanic or Latino (of any race)	1,579	4.0%

=== 2000 census ===
As of the 2000 census, there were 28,507 people, 9,731 households, and 8,105 families residing in the CDP. The population density was 2,209.7 inhabitants per square mile (853.2/km^{2}). There were 9,945 housing units at an average density of 770.9 per square mile (297.6/km^{2}). The racial makeup of the CDP was 92.45% White, 3.29% African American, 0.18% Native American, 2.77% Asian, 0.04% Pacific Islander, 0.32% from other races, 1.19% Hispanic or Latino and 0.94% from two or more races.

There were 9,731 households, out of which 40.9% had children under the age of 18 living with them, 73.7% were married couples living together, 6.8% had a female householder with no husband present, and 16.7% were non-families. 13.4% of all households were made up of individuals, and 5.8% had someone living alone who was 65 years of age or older. The average household size was 2.89 and the average family size was 3.17 people.

In the CDP, the population was spread out, with 28.1% under the age of 18, 4.9% from 18 to 24, 25.9% from 25 to 44, 29.0% from 45 to 64, and 12.1% who were 65 years of age or older. The median age was 40 years. For every 100 females, there were 94.7 males. For every 100 females age 18 and over, there were 91.5 males.

=== 2007 estimate ===
According to a 2007 estimate, the median income for a household in the CDP was $106,983, and the median income for a family was $116,246. Males had a median income of $70,742 versus $45,061 for females. The per capita income for the CDP was $40,985. About 0.6% of families and 1.2% of the population were below the poverty line, including 0.4% of those under age 18 and 3.0% of those age 65 or over.

== Local schools ==
Public and private schools in Severna Park are:

- Severna Park Elementary School
- Jones Elementary School
- Oak Hill Elementary School
- Folger McKinsey Elementary School
- Benfield Elementary
- Shipley's Choice Elementary School (technically in Millersville, but part of Severna Park feeder system)
- Severna Park Middle School
- St. John the Evangelist School (local catholic school)
- St. Martin's in the Field Day School
- Severna Park High School
- Severn School

== Notable people ==
- Josh Banks, professional baseball player
- Bud Beardmore, former American lacrosse coach
- Steve Bisciotti, owner of the Baltimore Ravens
- Mark Budzinski, former professional baseball player and current first base coach for the Toronto Blue Jays
- Henry W. Buse Jr., Lieutenant general in the Marine Corps
- Lauren Faust, American Emmy-Award-winning animator, writer, director, and producer; story developer for The Powerpuff Girls and My Little Pony: Friendship Is Magic
- Gavin Floyd, former professional baseball player
- Steve Gorman, drummer for the American rock band The Black Crowes
- Jeff Hatch, former professional football player and actor
- Marjorie Holt, U.S. congresswoman
- Cornelia MacIntyre Foley (1909–2010), artist
- Ronald Malfi, novelist
- John Marburger, American physicist; former director, the Office of Science and Technology Policy; former President of Stony Brook University; former director of Brookhaven National Laboratory
- Billy Martin, Good Charlotte guitarist
- Jackson Merrill, professional baseball player
- Eric Milton, former professional baseball player
- Max Ochs, Takoma Records guitarist
- Gordon Byrom Rogers, United States Army Lieutenant General
- Mitchell T. Rozanski, American prelate of the Roman Catholic Church
- Pat Sajak, American game show host
- Trey Smack, professional American Football kicker for the Green Bay Packers
- Mark Teixeira, former professional baseball player
- Jarred Tinordi, professional hockey player
- Mark Tinordi, former hockey player for the Washington Capitals; principal owner of Severna Park Taphouse
- Frank Valentino, American operatic baritone
- Steve Wojciechowski, Head Men's Basketball Coach at Marquette University
- Drew Yates, professional soccer player

== See also ==
- Linstead House, a historic home in the Linstead community of Severna Park
