= Linstead House =

Historic house in Maryland, United States

- Location within Maryland
- 39.065°N 76.560°W

History
- Built: ca. 1772-1780

Site notes
- Architectural style: Colonial

The Linstead House is a historic home in the Linstead community of Severna Park, Maryland. The three-story brick house overlooks the Severn River and is believed to have been constructed by the McCubbin or Linstead families between 1772 and 1780.

In 1906, the property was sold to Francis and Harry Riggs of Baltimore, and it was subsequently used in the summers to entertain guests and throw lavish parties. During this period, the Riggs brothers also allowed the area Boy Scouts to use a large portion of the surrounding property as "Camp Linstead." Even the famous Maryland governor Albert Ritchie was known to occasionally stop by the Linstead House to partake in the Riggs brothers' parties.

The house was a homestead and part of a larger farm for much of its history, boasting a wine cellar and prize chickens and hogs. A short distance down the road from Linstead House is a cemetery dating back to the 1830s and containing the graves of multiple Linstead family members and Linstead House residents.

In the 1940s the estate was bought by the Carter family, who notably hosted Dwight D. Eisenhower for dinner at one point.

The building was restored in the second half of the 20th century, and remains a private residence today.

Linstead House is registered with the Maryland Historical Trust as "Carter's Bluff," MIHP number AA-132.
