= Mineola Downtown Historic District =

Historic district in Texas, United States

- U.S. National Register of Historic Places
- U.S. Historic district
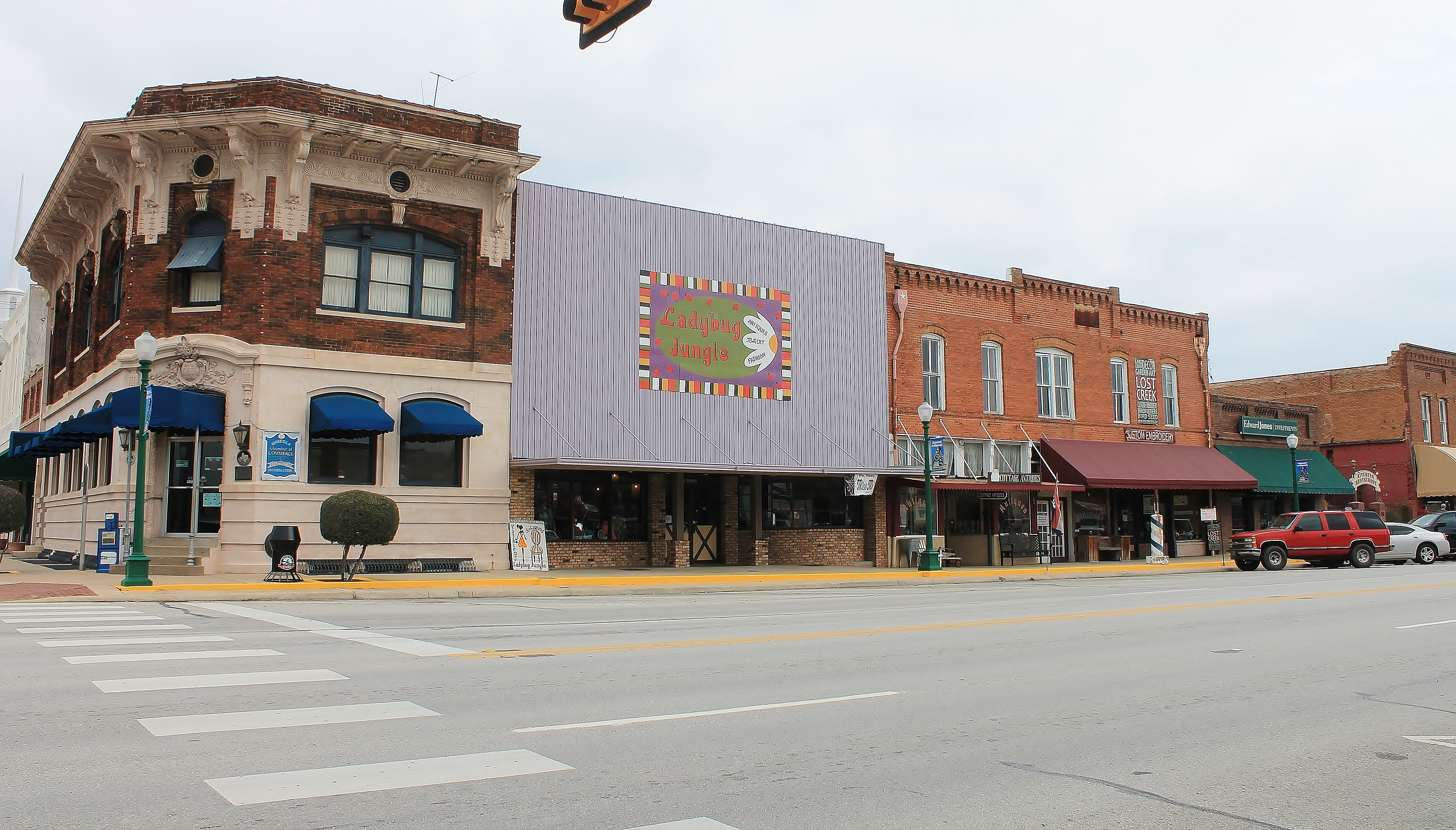
- East Broad Street in 2014

- Location within Texas Location within the United States
- Location: Roughly bounded by 1/2 blk. W. of Line St., Kilpatrick St., 1/2 blk. E. of Newsom St., Commerce St. & Mineola RR Depot, Mineola, Texas
- Coordinates: 32°39′48″N 95°29′19″W
- Area: 22.9 acres (9.3 ha)
- Architectural style: Moderne, Late 19th and 20th Century Revivals, Commercial Style
- NRHP reference No.: 13000288
- Added to NRHP: April 16, 2013

Mineola Downtown Historic District is located in Mineola, Texas. Most of the buildings in the district were built between 1885 and 1960. The district comprises 88 properties and covers almost 23 acres.

It was added to the National Register on April 16, 2013.

== Photo gallery ==
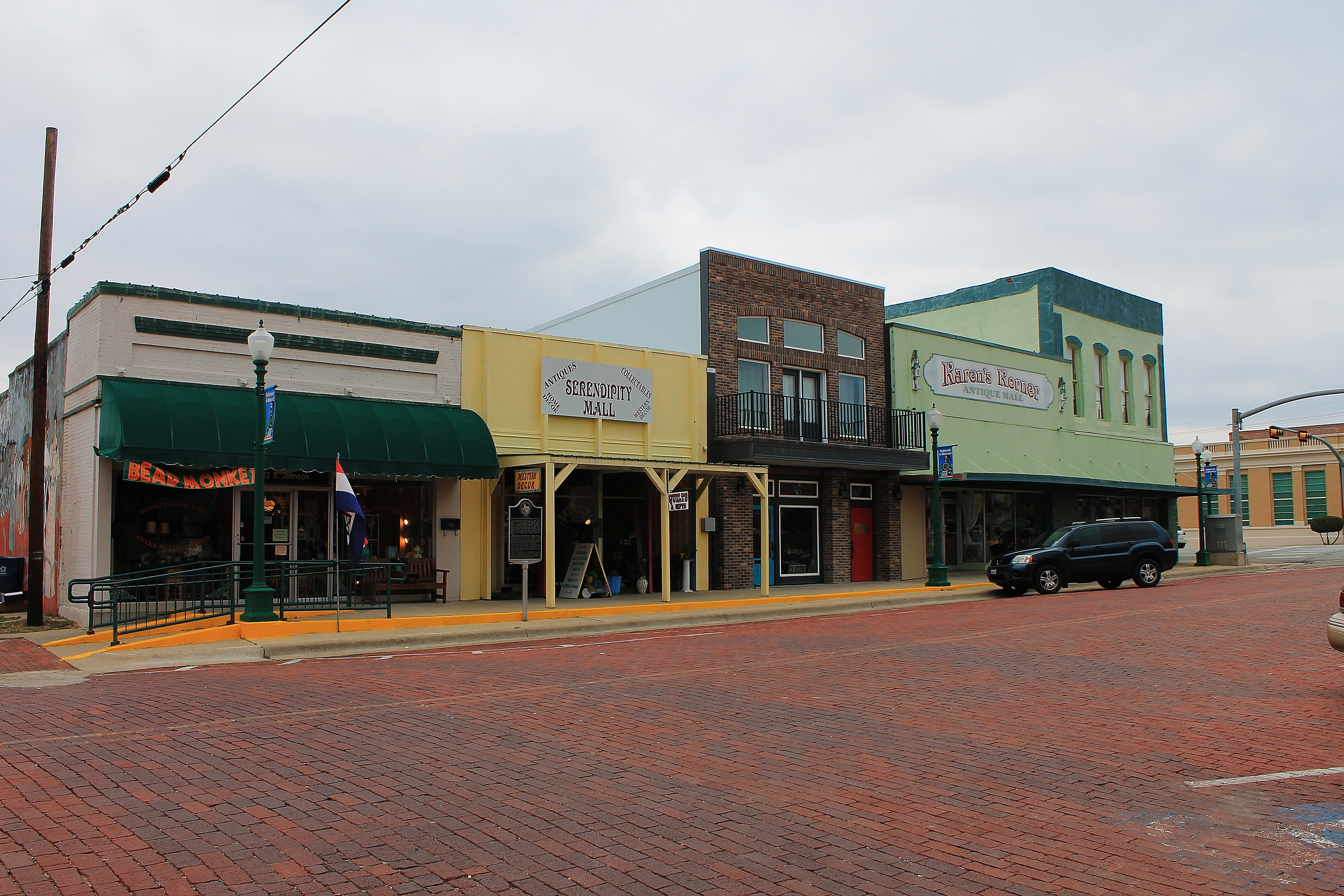
South Johnson Street

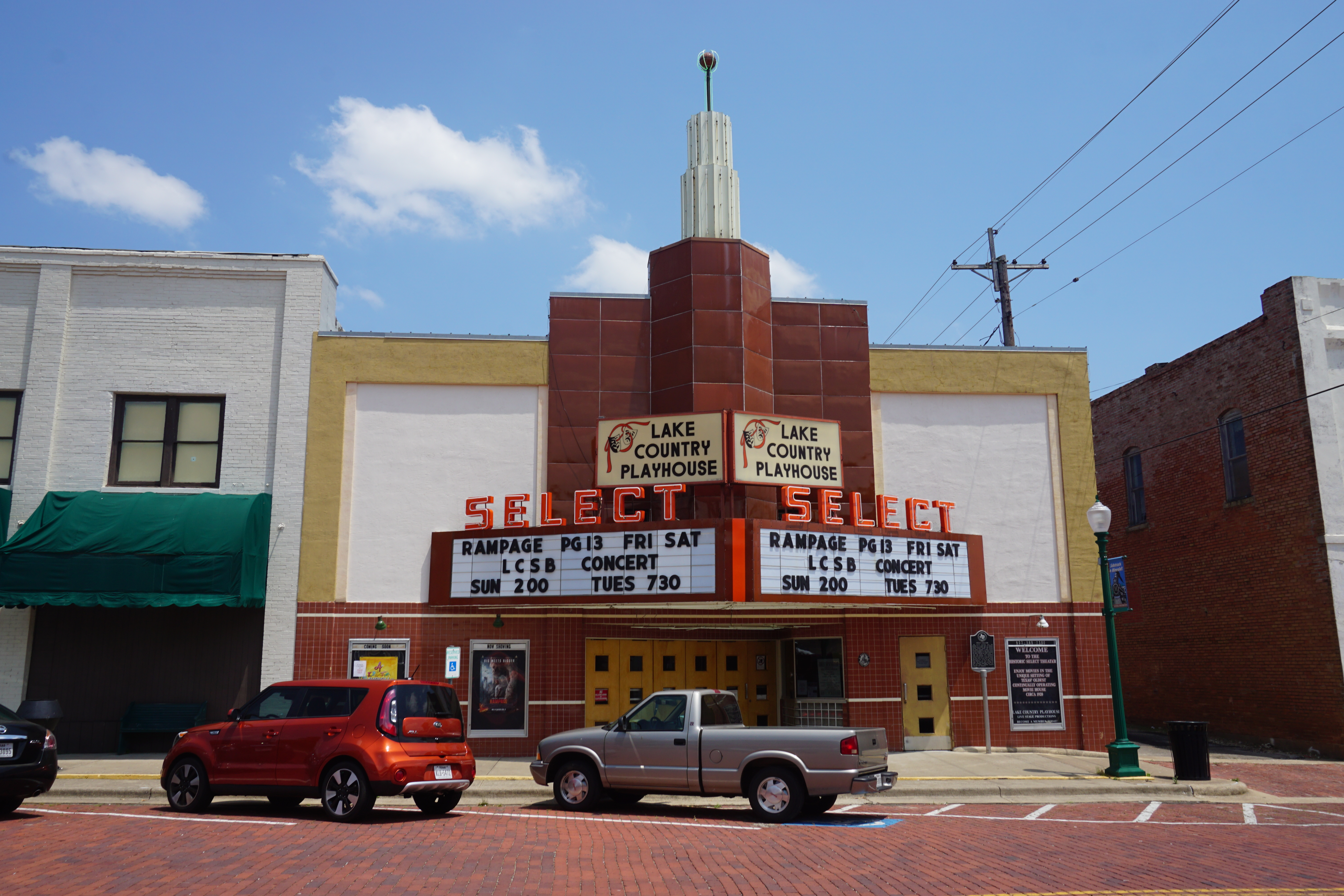
Lake Country Playhouse

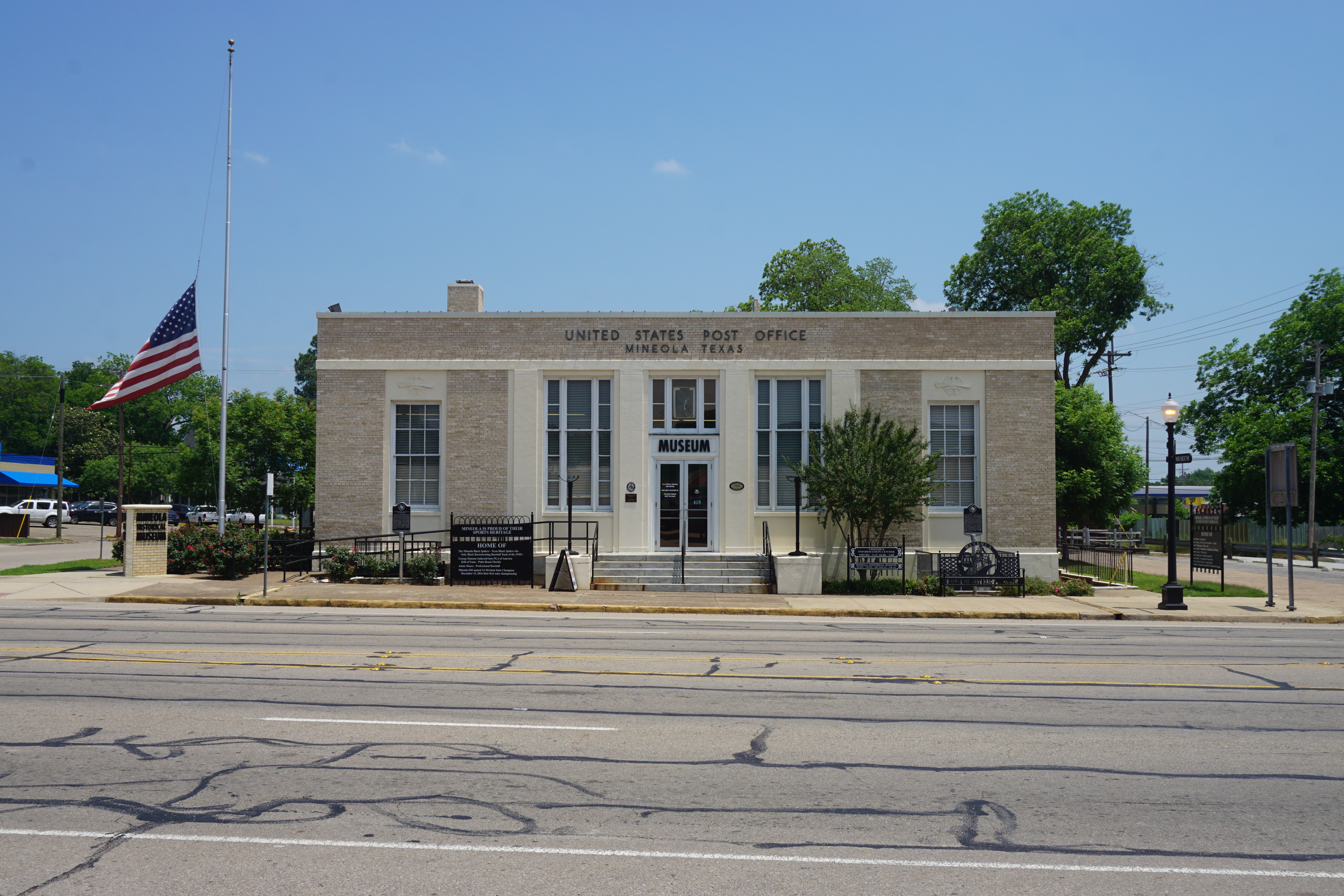
Mineola Historical Museum

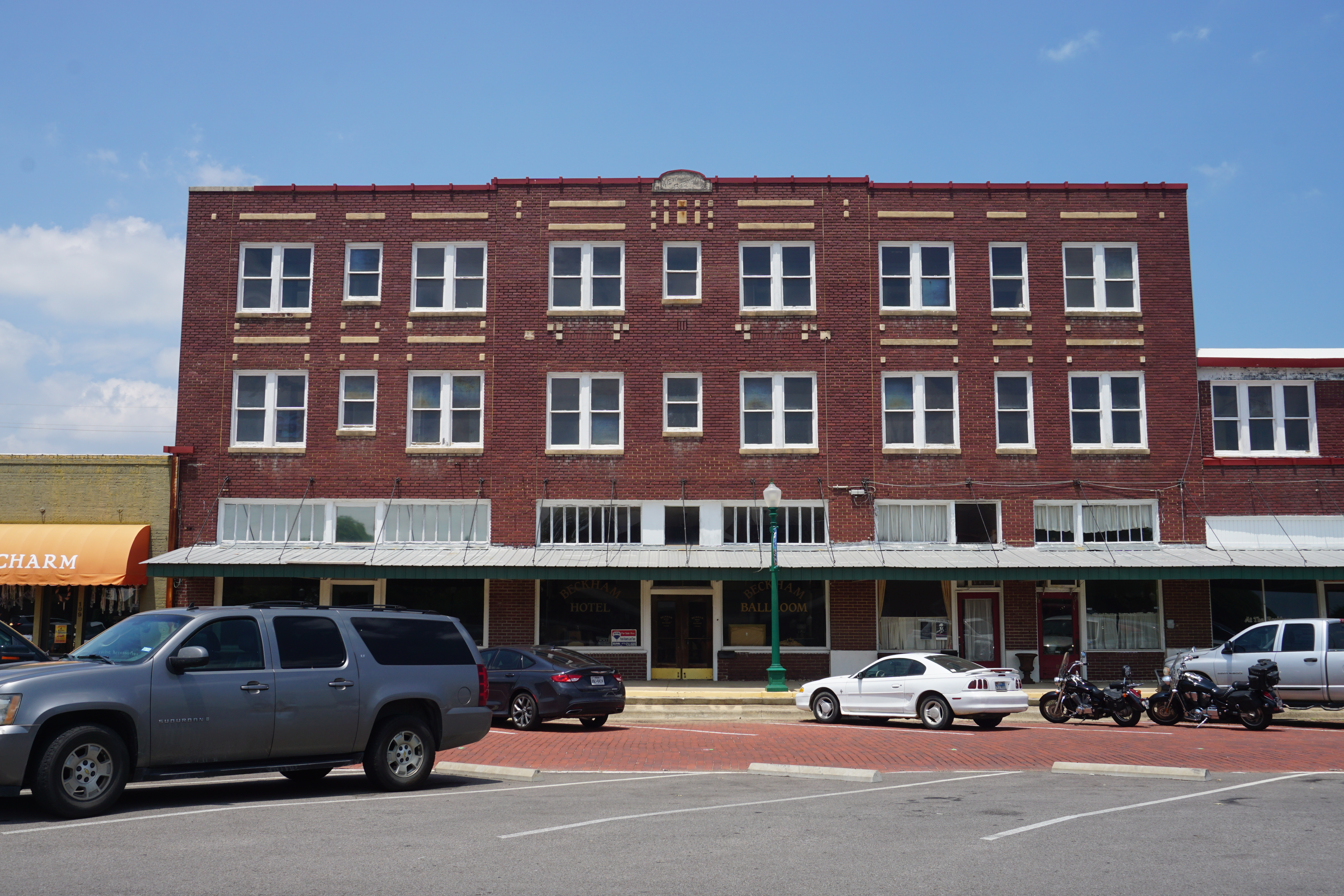
Beckham Hotel

== See also ==
- National Register of Historic Places listings in Wood County, Texas
- Recorded Texas Historic Landmarks in Wood County
