= Florence Robinson Cottage =

- U.S. National Register of Historic Places
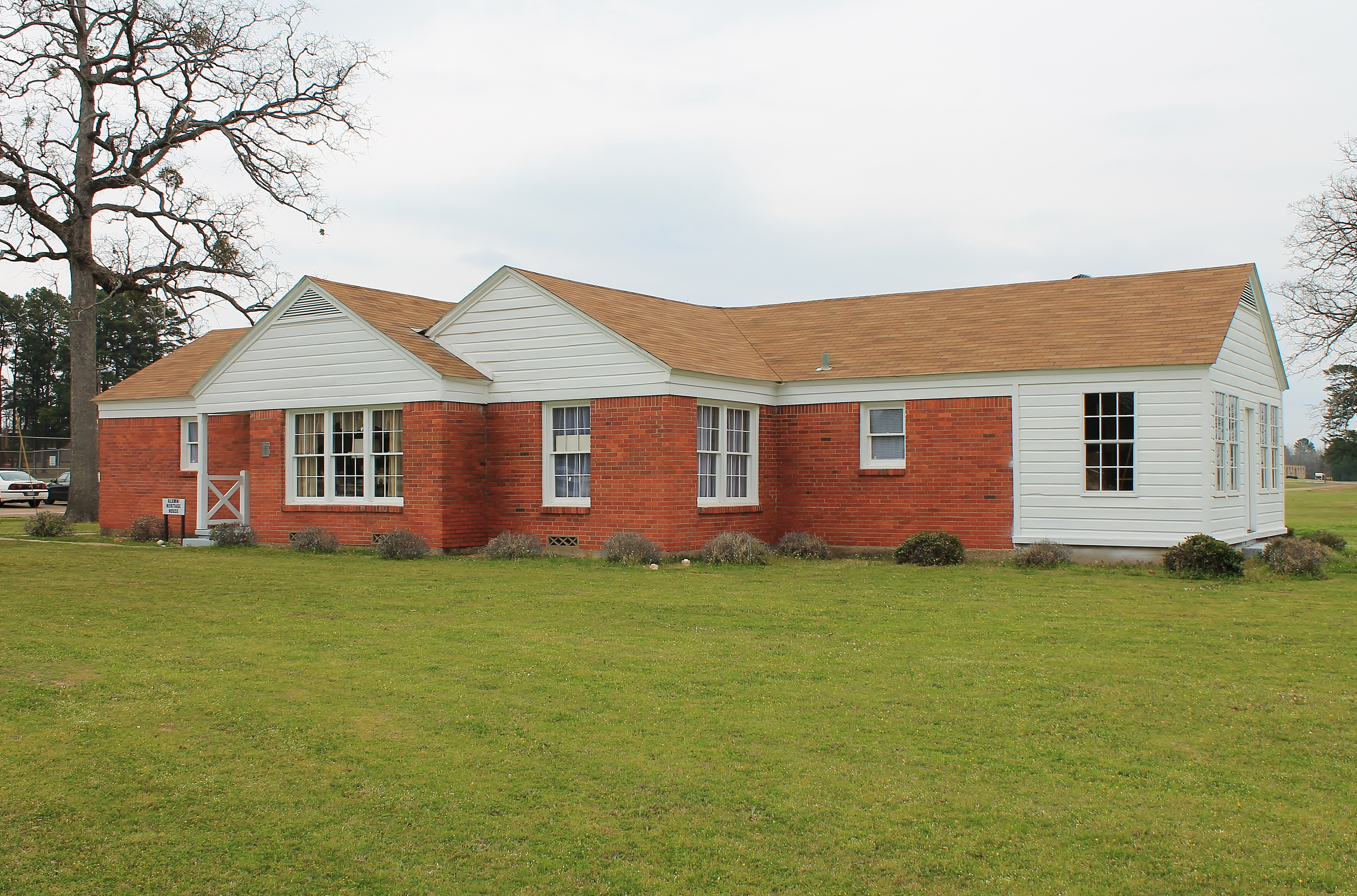
- Florence Robinson Cottage

- Location within Texas Location within the United States
- Location: Washington Place at Emma B. Smith Blvd., Jarvis Christian College, Hawkins, Texas
- Coordinates: 32°35′13″N 95°10′46″W
- Area: less than one acre
- Built: 1939
- Architectural style: Modern Movement
- NRHP reference No.: 00000453
- Added to NRHP: May 5, 2000

The Florence Robinson Cottage, also known as the Florence Robinson Building and the Alumni Heritage House, is a structure on the National Register of Historic Places located in Wood County, Texas on the campus of Jarvis Christian University outside Hawkins, Texas. The cottage is in the Modern Movement Style.

Constructed in 1939-1941 and remodeled in 1976, the building is the only structure on the campus remaining from the eleven year presidency of Peter Clarence Washington at the institution. The building became the Alumni Heritage House in 1976.

It was nominated for placement on the National Register of Historic Places in April, 2000, and installed on the registry in May of that year.

== Architecture and style ==
The home is a one-story, red brick Ranch Style house. The house has a low-pitched, gabled roof with composition shingles and the western entry is covered by a front-gabled porch. The southwestern corner of the building features a screened porch that was enclosed with siding to create a living area. In addition, the original chimneys have been removed from the home.

The southern elevation has a central door with six-pane over six-pane windows and wooden siding. The eastern elevation shows three sets of six-over-six windows and a small one-over-one window on the end with the gable. The screened porch, which has been enclosed, is on the southwest corner.

The interior of the structure has eight rooms: six bedrooms, a kitchenette, and a lounge located in the area of the formerly screened-in porch. All doors and windows on the structure are original to the construction.

It is unclear if any of the wood used in the structure was from an on-campus sawmill that operated at Jarvis, and was operated by students, through the 1940s. Many structures on the campus were built with wood from this sawmill.

== Construction and history ==
The home was constructed between 1939 and 1941 during the administration of Peter Clarence Washington, Jarvis' second president. It is one of two pre-World War II buildings on the campus.

Florence Robinson Cottage was construed by students and alumni at Jarvis. It initially served as the residence of the President during Washington's presidency, but in 1949 became the guest house.

The cottage was later renamed for Florence Robinson, who was a former Jarvis instructor who donated $10,000 for the home's restoration in 1976.

In 2001, Jarvis received a grant from the National Park Service's Historic Preservation Fund to renovate the cottage.

== See also ==
- National Register of Historic Places listings in Wood County, Texas
