= Spies–Robinson House =

Historic house in Portland, Oregon, U.S.

- U.S. National Register of Historic Places
- U.S. Historic district – Contributing property
- Portland Historic Landmark
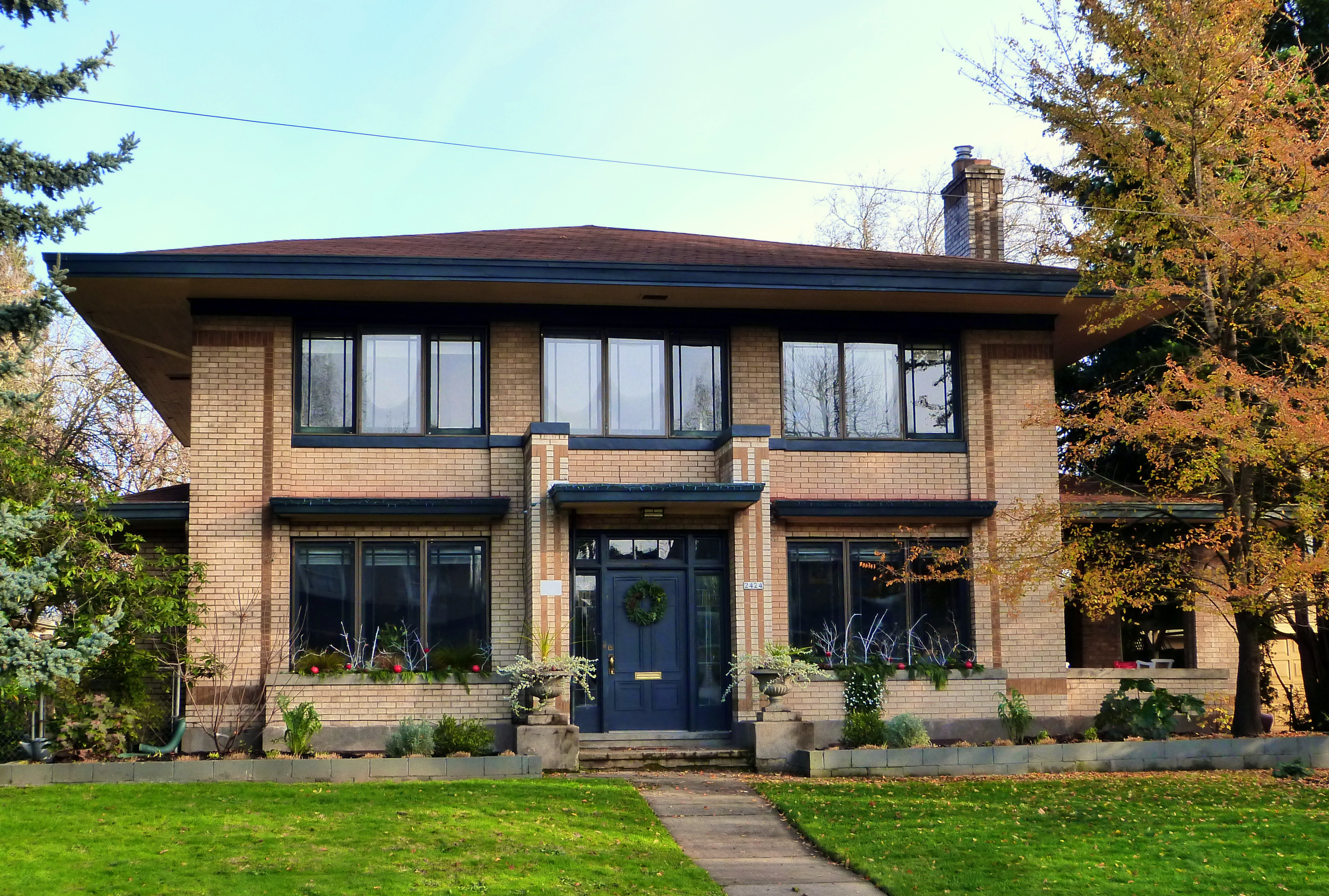
- The house in 2016

- Location within the United States Location within Oregon Location within Portland, Oregon
- Location: 2424 NE 17th Avenue; Portland, Oregon
- Coordinates: 45°32′24″N 122°38′53″W
- Built: 1922
- Built by: Christian Spies
- Architect: Orlo Hossack
- Architectural style: Prairie School
- Part of: Irvington Historic District (ID10000850)
- NRHP reference No.: 97000583
- Added to NRHP: June 13, 1997

The Spies–Robinson House is a historic residence in Portland, Oregon, United States. Built in 1922, it is an exceptional example of a Prairie School house in Northeast Portland. Its use of a brick veneer, while common nationally, is nearly unique in the Northeast quadrant, where stucco walls predominate in Prairie School designs. Additionally, two colors of brick are used to provide detail and accent in the design. The house is also notable for its occupancy starting in 1930 by David Robinson (1890–1963), a locally prominent attorney and civil rights advocate. Robinson is especially associated with public defender services and legal aid, and was a leader in the Portland chapter of the Anti-Defamation League.

The house was entered on the National Register of Historic Places in 1997.

== See also ==
- National Register of Historic Places listings in Northeast Portland, Oregon
