= Robinson House (Richmond, Virginia) =

Historic house in Virginia, United States

- U.S. National Register of Historic Places
- Virginia Landmarks Register
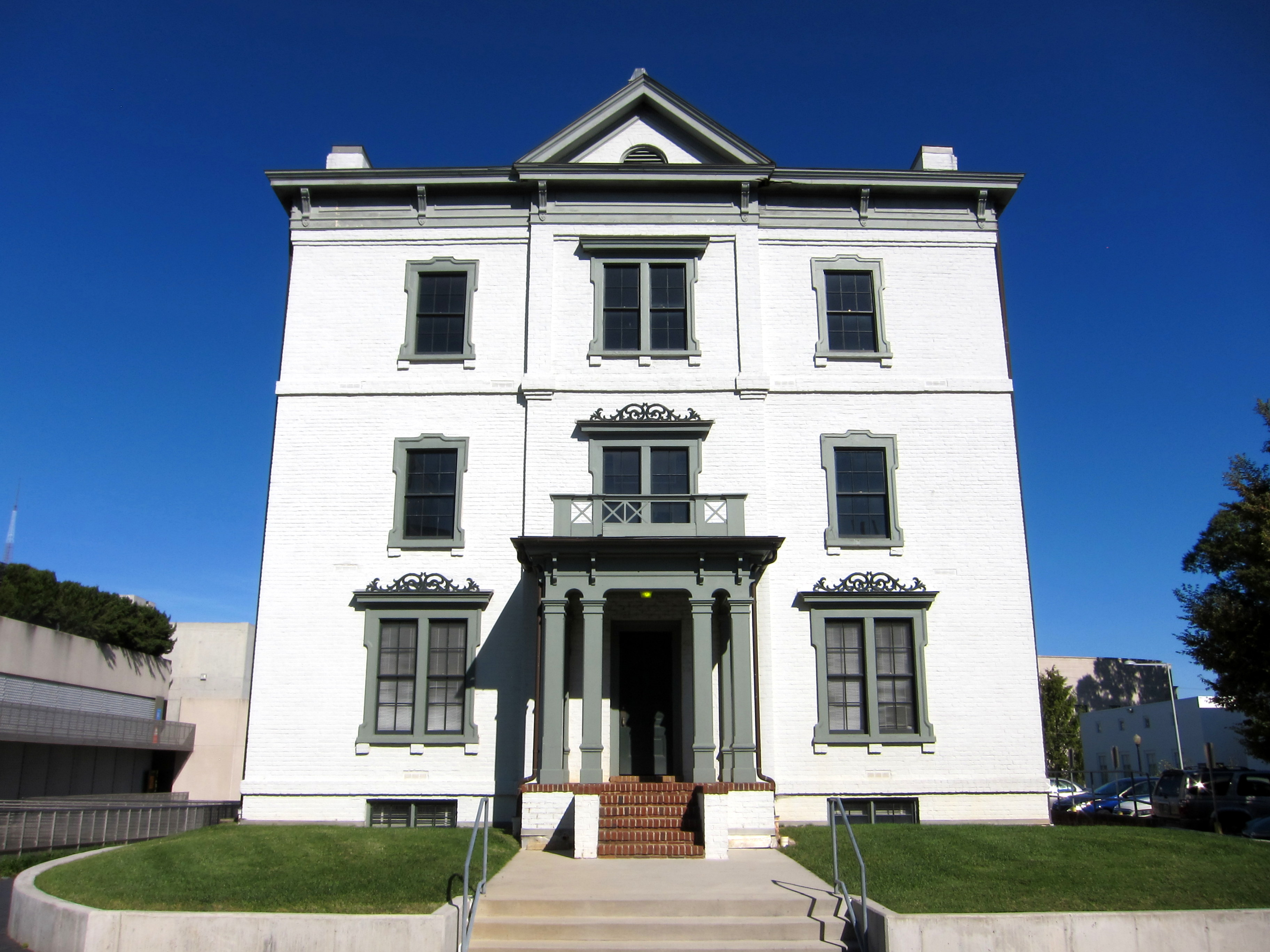
- Robinson House in 2016

- Location within Virginia Location within the United States
- Location: 200 North Blvd., Richmond, Virginia
- Coordinates: 37°33′25.6″N 77°28′27.0006″W
- Area: Less than 1 acre
- Built: c. 1845-1859, 1884
- Architect: Fleming, Robert I.
- Architectural style: Italianate
- NRHP reference No.: 13000993
- VLR No.: 127-0741

Significant dates
- Added to NRHP: December 24, 2013
- Designated VLR: October 1, 2013

Robinson House, also known as The Grove, Main Building, and Fleming Hall, is a historic home located in Richmond, Virginia.

== Description ==
The house is located on the present-day campus of the Virginia Museum of Fine Arts (VMFA) and on property that also bears the designation of the R. E. Lee Camp Confederate Memorial Park. It is a three-story, 7,900 square foot, brick Italianate style building.

== History ==
Originally built in the late 1820s by Richmond banker Anthony Robinson Jr. (1792-1861) as a modest one-story summer home, it was expanded in the late 1850s to a two-story mansion for year-round residency by the Robinson family. In late 1884 it was sold along with 36 acres by Robinson's son, Channing, to the newly formed R. E. Lee, Camp No. 1, Confederate Veterans organization to create a home for indigent and disabled veterans. The R. E. Lee Confederate Soldiers’ Home, funded primarily by the Commonwealth of Virginia after 1892, grew to a large complex of over 30 buildings, including residential cottages and a hospital. Robinson House—then called Fleming Hall for the architect/donor who contributed the third floor and pyramidal belvedere in 1886—served as the home's administration building, library, and war museum. When the Soldiers’ Home closed in 1941, the Commonwealth of Virginia transferred the care of the building to the state Department of General Services, and, in 1993, to VMFA which still owns and maintains it today. After extensive renovations the refurbished house now features a Richmond regional tourism center and a history exhibition, open to the public daily, admission free.

The house was listed on the National Register of Historic Places and Virginia Landmarks Register in 2013.

== See also ==
- National Register of Historic Places listings in Richmond, Virginia
