= Robinson House (Severna Park, Maryland) =

Historic house in Maryland, United States

- U.S. National Register of Historic Places
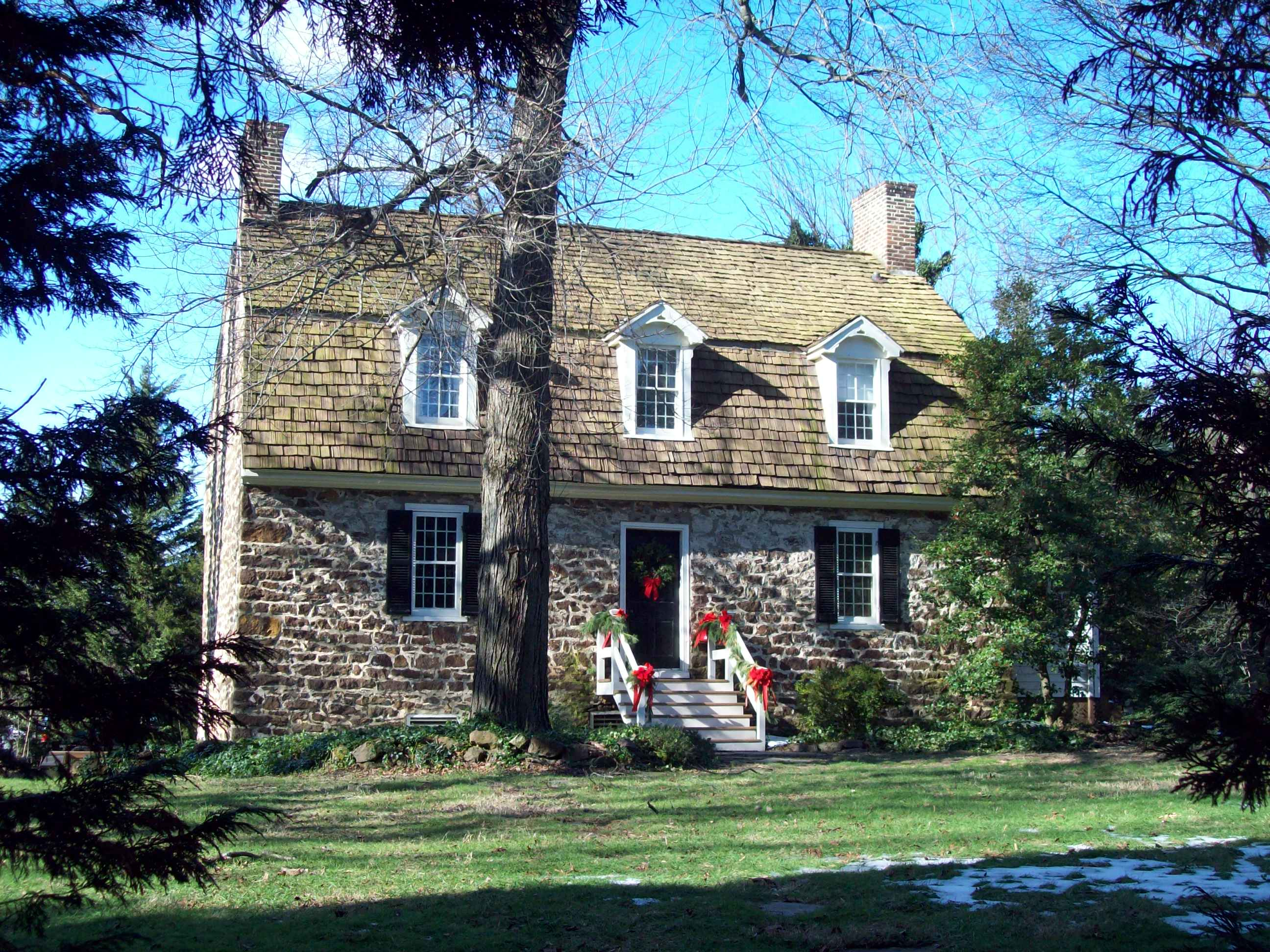
- Robinson House, December 2009

- Location within Maryland Location within the United States
- Nearest city: 102 Evon Ct., Severna Park, Maryland
- Coordinates: 39°5′22.55″N 76°32′55.53″W
- Area: 1 acre (0.40 ha)
- Built: 1740
- Architectural style: Colonial
- NRHP reference No.: 09000782
- Added to NRHP: September 30, 2009

Robinson House is a historic home located at Severna Park in Anne Arundel County, Maryland, United States. It was built about 1740 and is a 1 1/2-story stone dwelling with a gambrel roof, 40 feet wide by 24 feet deep. It is built of red sandstone, locally known as ironstone.

It was listed on the National Register of Historic Places in 2009.
