= Robinson-Lewis-G. F. Fessenden House =

Historic house in Massachusetts, United States

- U.S. National Register of Historic Places
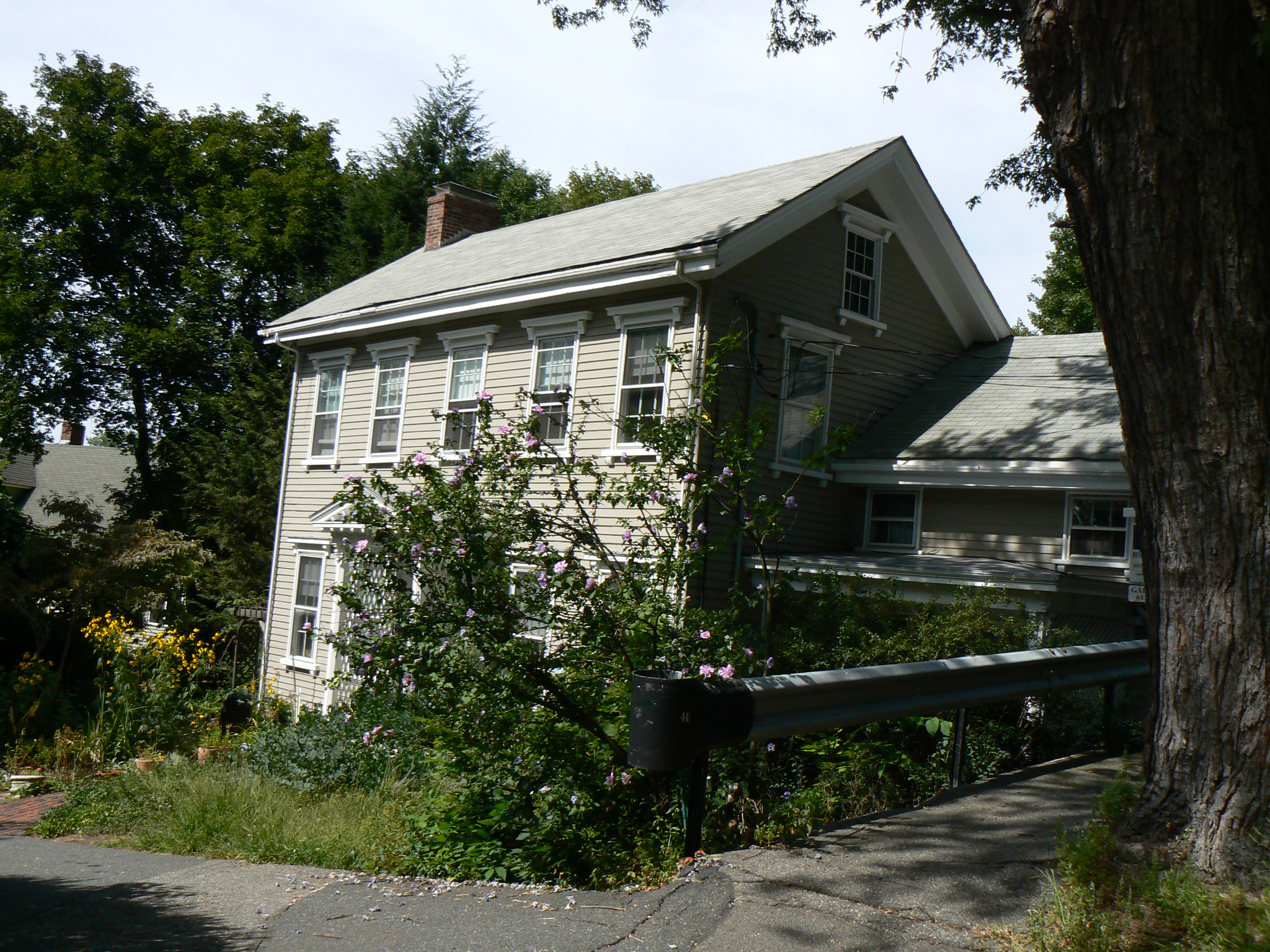
- A photo of the house, taken in 2008

- Location within Massachusetts Location within the United States
- Location: 40 Westminster Avenue, Arlington, Massachusetts
- Coordinates: 42°25′38″N 71°11′6″W
- Built: 1850
- Architectural style: Italianate
- MPS: Arlington MRA
- NRHP reference No.: 85001045
- Added to NRHP: April 18, 1985

The Robinson-Lewis-G. F. Fessenden House is a historic house in Arlington, Massachusetts. The 2 1/2-story wood-frame house was built c. 1850, and is a well-preserved Italianate style house, with ornate bracketed window surrounds, and a gable-roofed front porch with dentil moulding and full pediment. It was built as a farmhouse in an area that was not developed as a residential subdivision until later in the 19th century, and only had a few houses prior to that development.

The house was listed on the National Register of Historic Places in 1985.

== See also ==
- National Register of Historic Places listings in Arlington, Massachusetts
