= Pearson-Robinson House =

Historic house in Arkansas, United States

- Pearson–Robinson House
- U.S. National Register of Historic Places
- U.S. Historic district – Contributing property
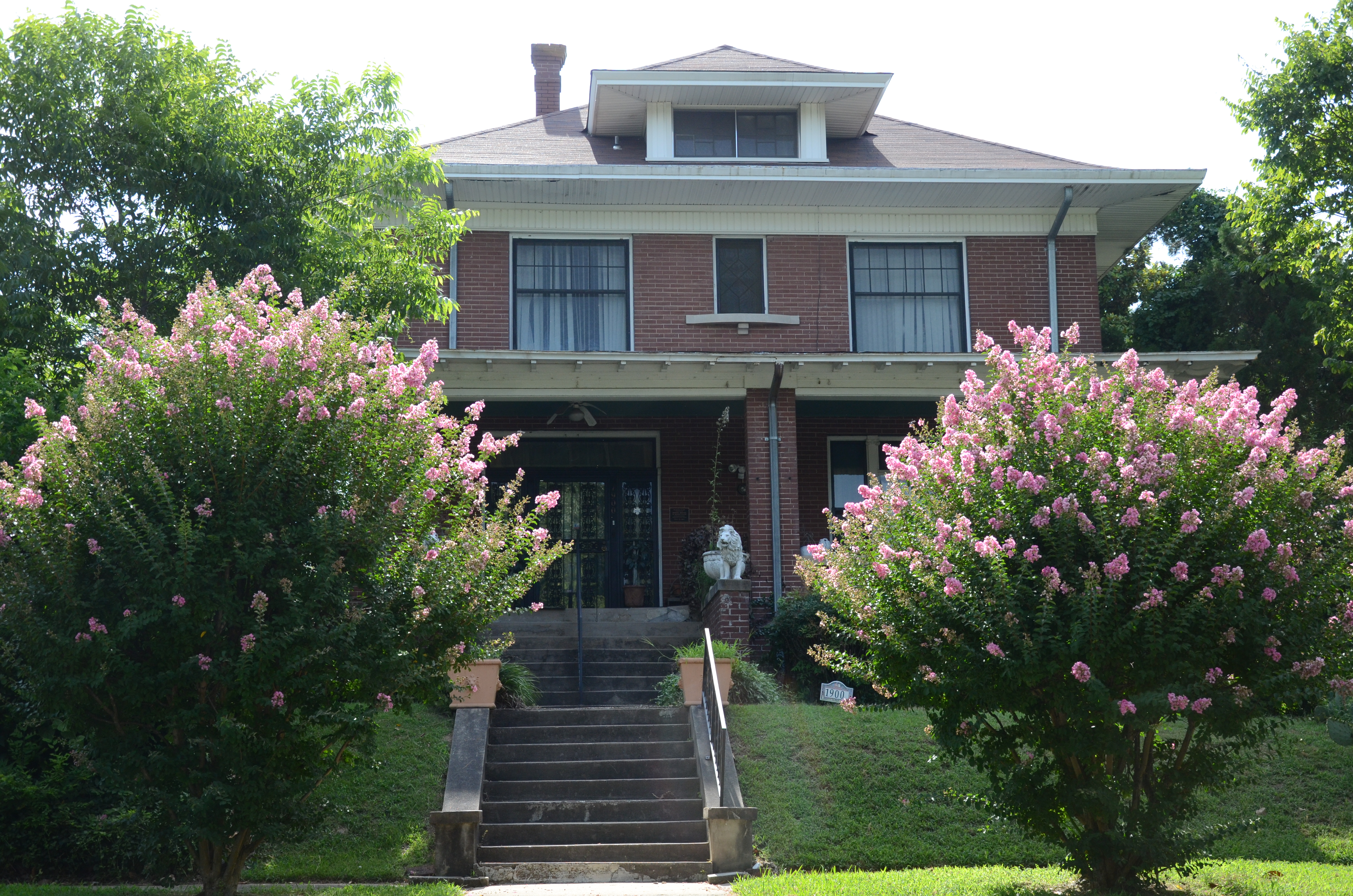

- Location within Arkansas Location within the United States
- Location: 1900 Marshall St., Little Rock, Arkansas
- Coordinates: 34°43′54″N 92°17′30″W
- Area: less than one acre
- Built: 1900
- Built by: Raleigh Pearson
- Part of: Central High School Neighborhood Historic District (2012 boundary increase) (ID12000320)
- NRHP reference No.: 78000623

Significant dates
- Added to NRHP: July 24, 1978
- Designated CP: June 7, 2012

The Pearson–Robinson House is a historic house at 1900 Marshall Street in Little Rock, Arkansas. It is a 2 1/2-story brick building, with a dormered hip roof, and a broad porch extending across the front. The porch is supported by brick piers, and has a bracketed eave. It was built in 1900 by Raleigh Pearson, and was purchased in 1903 by future United States Senator and Governor of Arkansas Joseph Taylor Robinson. It has also been home to Governors George W. Hays, Charles H. Brough, Thomas C. McRae, and Tom Jefferson Terral.

The house was listed on the National Register of Historic Places in 1978.

== See also ==
- Joseph Taylor Robinson House
- National Register of Historic Places listings in Little Rock, Arkansas
