= Robinson House (Arlington, Massachusetts) =

Historic house in Massachusetts, United States

- U.S. National Register of Historic Places
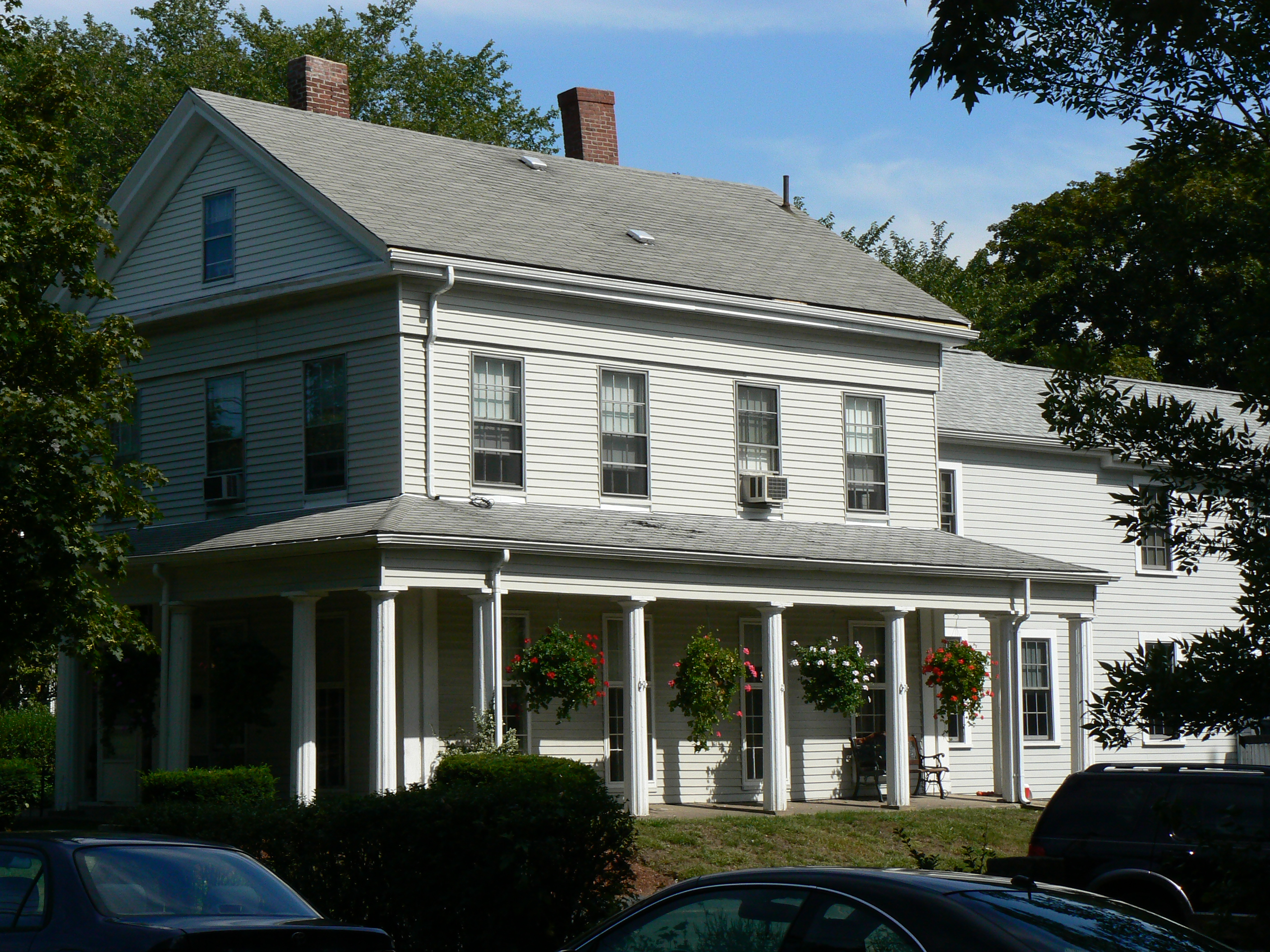
- Photo taken in 2008

- Location within Massachusetts Location within the United States
- Location: 19 Winter Street, Arlington, Massachusetts
- Coordinates: 42°24′25″N 71°8′28″W
- Built: 1850
- Architectural style: Greek Revival
- MPS: Arlington MRA
- NRHP reference No.: 85001044
- Added to NRHP: April 18, 1985

The Robinson House is an historic house in Arlington, Massachusetts. The 2 1/2-story wood-frame house was built in 1846 (probably as a speculative venture, as was the adjacent W.W. Kimball House) after the introduction of train service into Arlington. It has retained some of its Greek Revival styling (notably the fully pedimented gable end, the wraparound porch with fluted columns, and full-length first-floor windows) despite the application of siding.

The house was added to the National Register of Historic Places in 1985.

== See also ==
- National Register of Historic Places listings in Arlington, Massachusetts
