= First National Bank (Huntsville, Alabama) =

- U.S. National Register of Historic Places
- The building in May 2010

- Location within Huntsville, Alabama Location within Alabama Location within the United States
- Location: West Side Sq., Huntsville, Alabama
- Coordinates: 34°43′46.5″N 86°35′8″W
- Area: less than one acre
- Built: 1835–1836
- Architect: George Steele
- Architectural style: Greek Revival
- NRHP reference No.: 74000421
- Added to NRHP: October 25, 1974

The First National Bank is a historic bank building in Huntsville, Alabama. The temple-form Greek Revival structure was built in 1835–1836. Designed by locally famous architect George Steele, it occupies a prominent position, facing the courthouse square and sitting on a bluff directly above the Big Spring. It was the longest-serving bank building in Alabama, operating until 2010 when Regions Bank moved their downtown branch to a new location. The building was listed on the National Register of Historic Places in 1974.

== History ==
The First National Bank building is situated on the west side of Courthouse Square, on a bluff above the Big Spring and Big Spring Park. The site is where the founder of Huntsville, John Hunt, built his cabin in 1805. The first bank to open in what was then the Mississippi Territory was the Planters and Merchants Bank, chartered in 1817. Beginning in 1818, they occupied a small brick building on the square, which had been built as a mercantile store two years prior. Despite its long list of wealthy local investors, the bank soon became over-leveraged. Governor Israel Pickens ordered the bank to be shut down in 1822, but legal challenges staved off dissolution until 1825. The bank's building burned sometime between 1828 and 1830.

Pickens won re-election as governor in 1823, running on a platform that included the establishment of a state bank. The bank was founded in 1824 in the capital, Cahaba, moving to Tuscaloosa along with the government in 1826. Assets came from bond sales and trust funds owned by the State. Branches were established in Mobile, Montgomery, and Decatur in 1832. Feeling slighted that the North Alabama branch was given to the younger and smaller Decatur, Huntsville legislators fought for a branch, which was awarded in 1835. Construction of the building was completed the following year.

The availability of credit further fueled the land rush known as Alabama Fever. The banks provided enough revenue to the state government that the legislature abolished state taxes. The good times were short-lived, as the bank quickly became over-leveraged in the Panic of 1837. Benjamin Fitzpatrick was elected governor in 1841, promising to shut down the state bank. The charter expired in 1844, and was not renewed; the bank's debts were not settled until 1853.

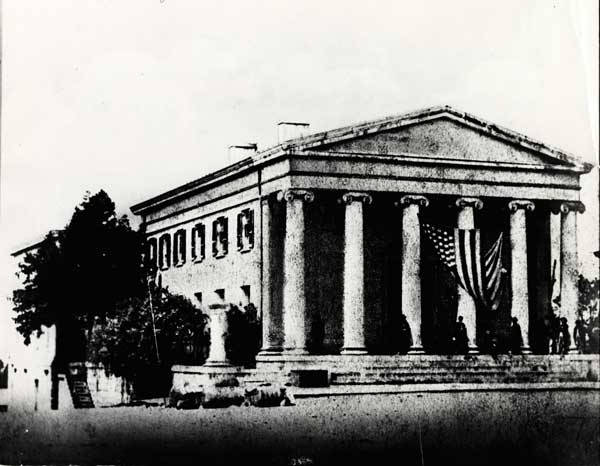
The bank bears the Union flag shortly after Huntsville was occupied by Federal troops in 1862.

The same year, the Northern Bank of Alabama was founded in the old State Bank building. It operated until the Civil War, when Union troops occupied Huntsville in 1862. During the war, the building was used as a commissary. At the end of the war, the National Bank of Huntsville was founded, using assets hidden from Union troops inside the building. In 1889 the bank changed its name to the First National Bank of Huntsville. First National merged with the Exchange Security Bank of Birmingham to form the First Alabama Bank in 1971. First Alabama changed its name to Regions Bank in 1992. Regions occupied the building until February 2010, when they moved their downtown branch to a larger location and donated the building to a non-profit redevelopment group.

== Architecture ==
The National Bank represented a shift in architectural design, both for architect George Steele, and for North Alabama as a whole. Prior to submitting a bid for the bank, most of Steele's work was in the Federal style, which was popular in the first quarter of the 19th century. Steele drew inspiration for his design from a trip to Washington, D.C. and Charlottesville, Virginia. The building is similar in form to the Bank of Pennsylvania and has a similar floorplan to the First Bank of the United States in Philadelphia, both buildings featured in pattern books of the day. Steele also won the bid for the second Madison County Courthouse, another temple-form Greek Revival building located across from the bank and completed in 1840.

The main block of the building is 53 feet (16 m) wide by 77 feet (23.5 m) long. The hexastyle portico and façade are constructed of locally quarried limestone blocks, with the rest of the building constructed of stuccoed brick. The Ionic columns support a plain entablature, adorned only with the name of the bank (currently Regions). The 15 foot (4.5 m) tall double entry doors are made of red cedar, and have five square relief panels each. Two smaller doors, which open directly into front offices, flank the main door, each of which is topped with a four-panel transom; these doors were added in 1899. An iron-railed balcony formerly stretched across the middle portion of the front, but was removed sometime between 1934 and 1973. Windows on the second floor façade and sides are sashes, with five narrow, vertical panes in the top and two in the bottom. First floor windows along the sides are six-over-six sashes. The small cupola and weather vane atop the copper gable roof are from the second Madison County Courthouse, which was demolished in 1914.

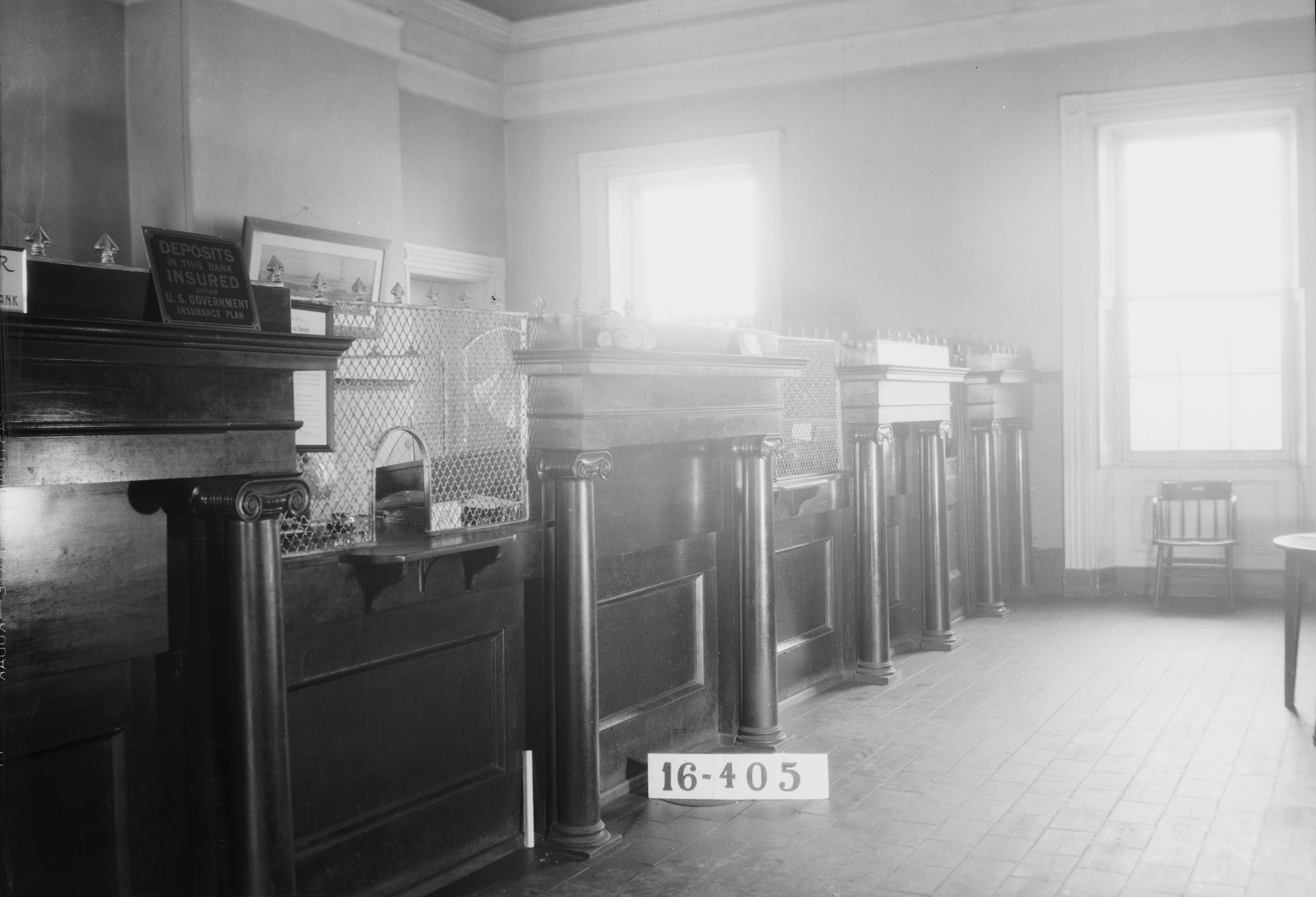
The tellers' desk inside the bank, pictured in 1934.

The main entrance to the building opens into a vestibule which is flanked by the two offices. The vestibule opens into the main lobby area, which is bisected by the mahogany tellers' desk. Between the teller stations, the desk has columns and entablature that mimic the façade. A tellers' room and the director's room are behind the desk, on either side of the bank vault. A fireplace mantel in the director's room also mimics the façade with Ionic pilasters. A service room and stair hall are at the rear of the building. The second floor was living quarters for the cashier, which was required by law when the bank was built.

Behind the main block, off the southeast corner, is a two-story wing, originally used as slave quarters. There are four rooms on each floor, and four more in the basement. A stair loggia with a deck above opened onto a sidewalk between the main building and Fountain Circle; the loggia was enclosed and access to the deck removed sometime after 1934. The northwest side was originally an open courtyard overlooking the Big Spring, but further additions now cover the entire area. The basement was used to house slaves who were being kept as collateral for mortgages by their owners. Windows on both floors on the Fountain Circle side are the same as those on the second floor of the main building. A door to the basement was removed and replaced with a night drop.
