= National Register of Historic Places listings in Wood County, Texas =

Location of Wood County in Texas

This is a list of the National Register of Historic Places listings in Wood County, Texas.

This is intended to be a complete list of properties and districts listed on the National Register of Historic Places in Wood County, Texas. There are one district and nine individual properties listed on the National Register in the county. Two individually listed properties are Recorded Texas Historic Landmarks while the district contains more.

This National Park Service list is complete through NPS recent listings posted March 21, 2025.

== Current listings ==
The publicly disclosed locations of National Register properties and districts may be seen in a mapping service provided.

	Name on the Register	Image	Date listed	Location	City or town	Description
1	Marcus DeWitt Carlock House	Marcus DeWitt Carlock House	May 14, 2013 (#13000277)	407 S. Main St. 32°57′13″N 95°17′29″W	Winnsboro	Recorded Texas Historic Landmark
2	George W. Haines Site	George W. Haines Site	May 10, 1990 (#90000764)	Address restricted	Hainesville	
3	Howle Site	Howle Site	April 13, 1977 (#77001482)	Address restricted	Quitman	
4	Howard L. and Vivian W. Lott House	Howard L. and Vivian W. Lott House	October 9, 1998 (#98001185)	311 E. Kilpatrick St. 32°39′50″N 95°29′09″W	Mineola	Recorded Texas Historic Landmark
5	Mineola Downtown Historic District	Mineola Downtown Historic District	April 16, 2013 (#13000288)	Roughly: area around Line, Kilpatrick, Newsome, and Commerce Streets; 32°39′48″N 95°29′19″W	Mineola	Includes Recorded Texas Historic Landmarks
6	Joseph and Martha Moody Farmstead	Joseph and Martha Moody Farmstead	May 10, 1990 (#90000765)	Address restricted	Hainesville	
7	Ned Moody Site	Ned Moody Site	May 4, 1990 (#90000724)	Address restricted	Hainesville	
8	Osborn Site	Osborn Site	December 15, 1976 (#76002086)	Address restricted 32°48′34″N 95°33′01″W	Quitman	
9	Florence Robinson Cottage	Florence Robinson Cottage	May 5, 2000 (#00000453)	Washington Place at Emma B. Smith Blvd., Jarvis Christian College; 32°35′13″N 95°10′46″W	Hawkins	
10	Sadler Site	Sadler Site	April 13, 1977 (#77001481)	Address restricted	Alba	

== See also ==
- National Register of Historic Places listings in Texas
- Recorded Texas Historic Landmarks in Wood County
