= Joseph Taylor Robinson House =

Historic house in Arkansas, United States

- U.S. National Register of Historic Places
- U.S. National Historic Landmark
- U.S. Historic district – Contributing property
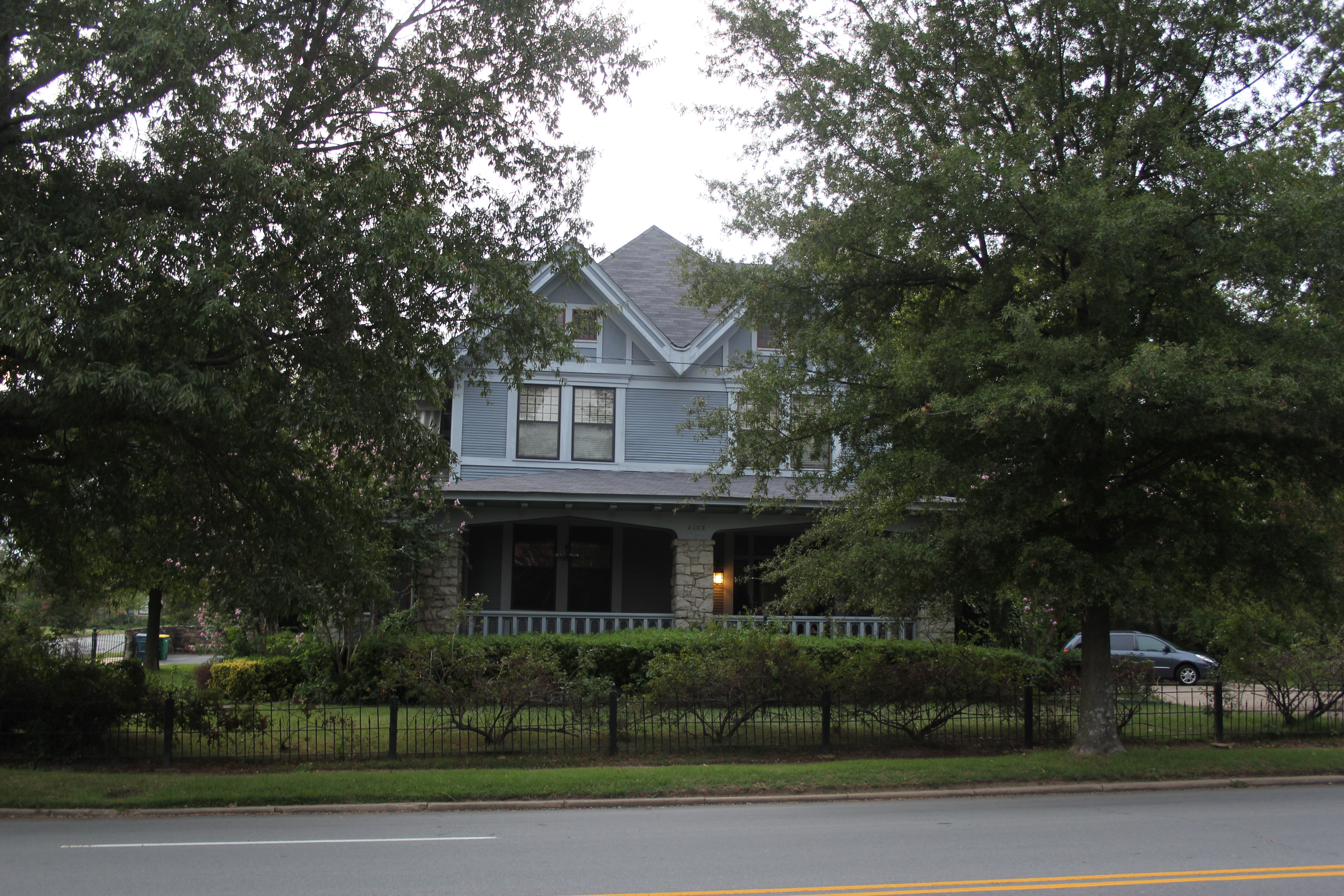

- Location within Arkansas Location within the United States
- Location: 2122 Broadway, Little Rock, Arkansas
- Coordinates: 34°43′39.5″N 92°16′43.7″W
- Area: less than one acre
- Built: 1904
- Architect: Frank W. Gibb
- Architectural style: Stick/Eastlake
- Part of: Governor's Mansion Historic District (1988 enlargement) (ID88000631)
- NRHP reference No.: 75000411

Significant dates
- Added to NRHP: August 28, 1975
- Designated NHL: October 12, 1994
- Designated CP: May 19, 1988

The Joseph Taylor Robinson House is a historic house at 2122 Broadway in Little Rock, Arkansas. Built in 1904 for a wealthy lumber merchant, it was the home of Arkansas governor and United States Senator Joseph Taylor Robinson between 1930 and 1937, the period of his greatest influence. Robinson (1872-1937) served as Senate Majority Leader from 1933 to 1937, and was instrumental in the passage of New Deal legislation during the Hundred Days Congress which followed the inauguration of Franklin Delano Roosevelt as President of the United States. Roosevelt was a guest of Robinson's at this house in 1936. It was designated a National Historic Landmark in 1994.

== Description ==
The Robinson house is a 2 1/2-story wood-frame structure resting on a foundation of granite and brick. The exterior is sheathed in clapboards, and the roof is steeply pitched with a complex and irregular plan. There are four chimneys, two of brick and two of granite and brick. The main (east-facing) facade consists of a full-width porch supported by three square granite posts, above which are two pairs of sash windows, topped by a pair of gable ends, each with two small square windows. The gable ends are finished in stucco with decorative half-timbering. The porch is decorated with flattened Tudor-style arches and ornamental brackets, and shelters the main entrance, which is under the right gable, and paired windows under the left gable.

The south elevation has a porch stylistically similar to that on the main facade, but smaller. Above it is a fully enclosed sleeping porch, and there is a gable dormer projecting from the roof. The west (rear) elevation has two small porches, and the north elevation has a dormer matching that on the south side.

The interior contains woodwork made from pine burr and other wood cuts available at the time. A sliding door between the living and dining rooms is made of pine burr, and the entrance columns to the living room were fashioned from tree trunks.

In addition to the house, the property includes a carriage house built using the same methods as the house. The yard is enclosed by an iron fence on the south and east sides, and a rock wall on the north and west sides.

== History ==
The house was designed by Frank W Gibb and purchased by Joseph Taylor Robinson, who had been a United States Senator since 1913. Robinson would live in this house until his death in 1937, and then his widow until her death in 1958. The house remained in the Robinson family until 1972, and was later used as a facility for housing cancer patients receiving treatment at Little Rock facilities. It was listed on the National Register of Historic Places in 1975, and was designated a National Historic Landmark in 1994, in recognition for its association with Robinson during his period of greatest influence in national politics. It is the best-preserved of the two surviving houses Robinson owned.

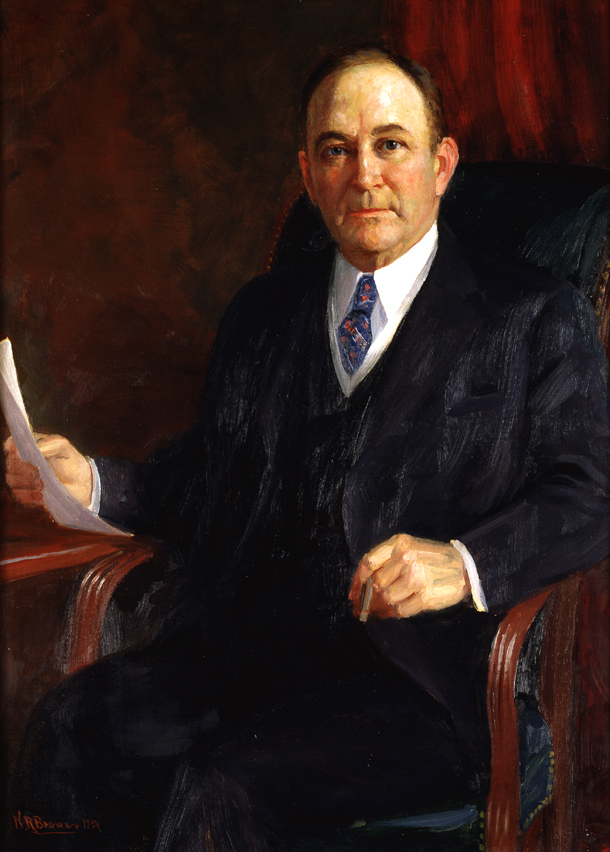
Official Senate portrait of Robinson

Joseph Taylor Robinson (1872-1937) was born in Lonoke, Arkansas, and attended the University of Arkansas and the University of Virginia Law School, both without graduating. He was admitted to the Arkansas Bar in 1895 and quickly distinguished himself. He was elected to the United States House of Representatives in 1902 as a Democrat, and served five terms before winning election as Governor of Arkansas. He served 55 days as governor, winning legislative appointment to the United States Senate in early 1913 after the previous appointee, Jefferson Davis, died.

In 1923 Robinson was elected Senate Minority Leader, and in 1928 he won the Democratic nomination for Vice President, on the ticket with Alfred E. Smith. The 1928 election, won by Herbert Hoover, put Robinson in the national spotlight. When Franklin Delano Roosevelt won election in 1932, Democrats also gained control of the Senate, and Robinson became Majority Leader. In this position he was a legislative lieutenant for Roosevelt's New Deal agenda, shepherding a number of important bills through the Senate. The only bill to bear his name is the Robinson-Patman Act, which forbade manufacturers from giving rebates to large retailers.

Robinson was apparently considered for a Cabinet position by Roosevelt, but the president apparently concluded Robinson had more value in the legislative arena. Robinson is known to have hosted Roosevelt at his Little Rock home only once, on June 10, 1936.

== See also ==
- Pearson-Robinson House
- List of National Historic Landmarks in Arkansas
- National Register of Historic Places listings in Little Rock, Arkansas
