= Jesse Robinson House (Seaford, Delaware) =

Historic house in Delaware, United States

- U.S. National Register of Historic Places
- Location within Delaware Location within the United States
- Location: High St., Seaford, Delaware
- Coordinates: 38°38′31″N 75°36′31″W
- Area: 0.2 acres (0.081 ha)
- Built: c. 1820, c. 1860
- Architectural style: Greek Revival, Italianate
- NRHP reference No.: 82002368
- Added to NRHP: August 26, 1982

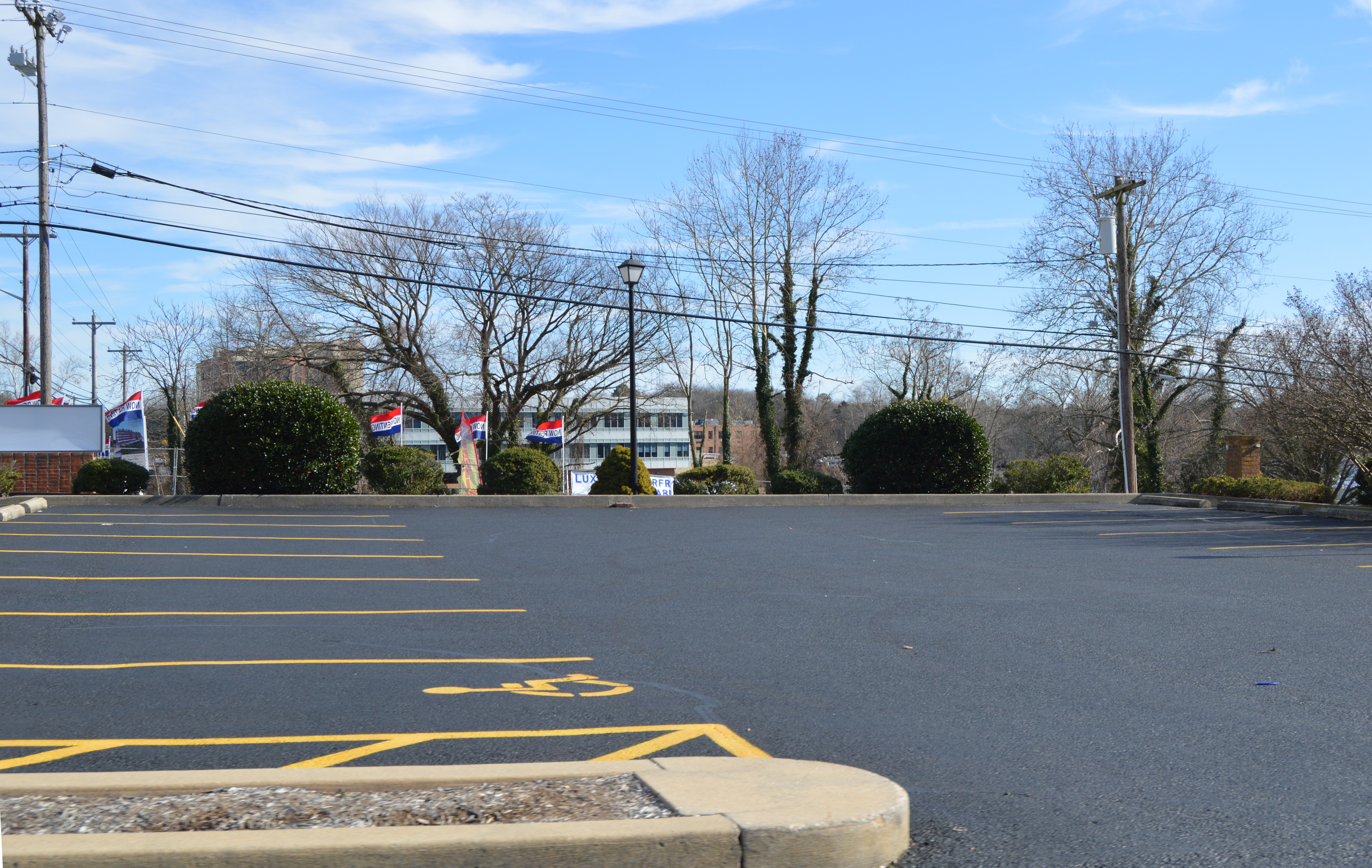
Robinson site in Seaford.jpg

Jesse Robinson House was a historic home located at Seaford, Sussex County, Delaware, United States. It consisted of two sections: the rear wing, built about 1820 as a single-pile, one-room-plan frame house, and the front section, added about 1860, as a two-story single-pile, center-hall-plan frame structure. Five bays in width and resting on a brick foundation, it had design elements that mixed the Greek Revival and Italianate styles.

It was added to the National Register of Historic Places in 1982.
