= Quietdale =

Historic house in Alabama, United States

- Mrs. William Robinson House
- U.S. National Register of Historic Places
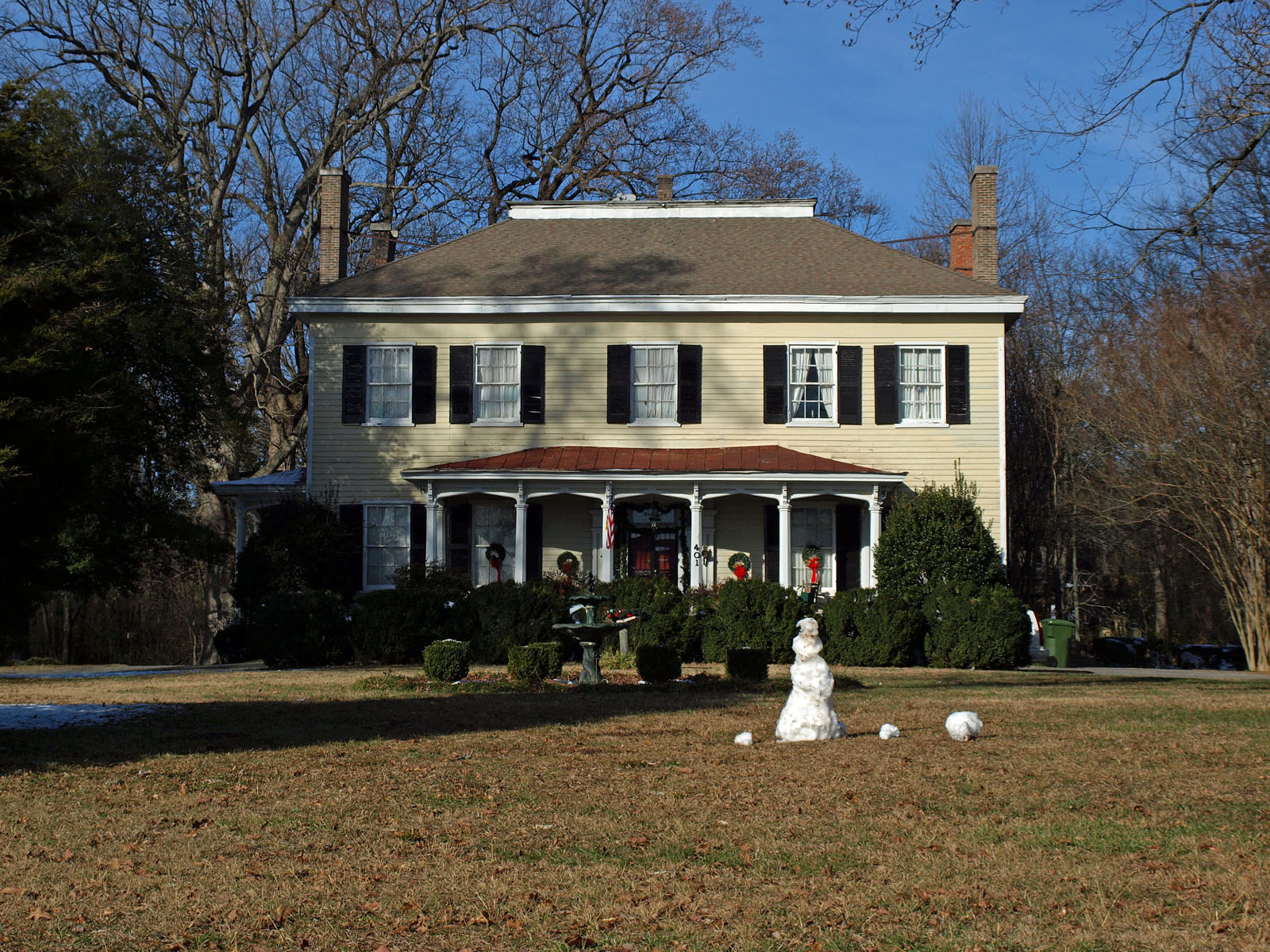
- The house in December 2010

- Location within Huntsville, Alabama Location within Alabama Location within the United States
- Location: 401 Quietdale Dr. NE, Huntsville, Alabama
- Coordinates: 34°45′25″N 86°34′26″W
- Area: 6.5 acres (2.6 ha)
- Built: 1854
- Architect: Mathew W. Steele
- Architectural style: Romantic Eclecticism
- NRHP reference No.: 82002054
- Added to NRHP: February 4, 1982

Quietdale (also known as the Mrs. William Robinson House) is a historic residence in Huntsville, Alabama, US. The house was built in 1854 for Caroline Moore Robinson, the widow of Madison County Sheriff William Robinson. It represents a shift in architecture from Neoclassical to the more eclectic forms that became prominent in the late 19th century.

The main block of the house is rectangular, with an ell off the rear and a two-story porch following the ell. The hipped roof is truncated to form a rooftop deck. A two-story, three-room, servants' quarters is connected to the house via the porch. Centered on the façade is a single-story hipped roof porch supported by six slender, octagonal columns with corbelled arches in the architraves. A similar porch extends along the west side of the house. Five large six-over-six sash windows stretch across the second floor, while the side of the house has two windows centered between two chimneys, with another window outside of them. There were originally two separate staircases which led to the divided second floor, but they were combined and the second floor joined by the second owner, Erskine Mastin.

The house was listed on the National Register of Historic Places in 1982.
