= William A. Robinson House =

Historic house in Maine, United States

- U.S. National Register of Historic Places
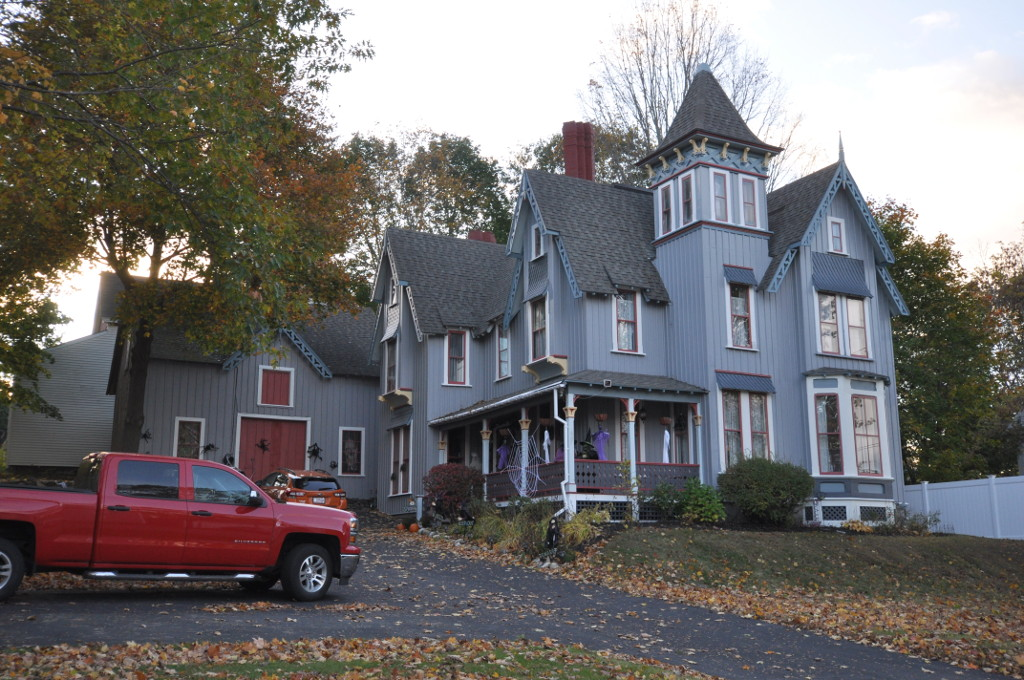

- Location within Maine Location within the United States
- Location: 11 Forest Ave., Auburn, Maine
- Coordinates: 44°5′49″N 70°14′12″W
- Built: 1874
- Architect: Kenway Brothers
- Architectural style: Gothic
- NRHP reference No.: 93000204
- Added to NRHP: April 3, 1993

William A. Robinson House is a historic house at 11 Forest Avenue in Auburn, Maine. Built in 1874, it is one of the region's finest examples of Late Gothic Revival architecture, and is the state's only surviving work of local architects Herbert and Balston Kenway. It was listed on the National Register of Historic Places in 1993.

== Description and history ==
The Robinson House stands in a residential area west of Auburn's downtown, on the west side of Forest Avenue, and is set on a hill overlooking the downtown. It is a two-story wood-frame structure, with a busy roofline featuring several gables and corbelled brick chimneys. The gables are decorated in Gothic vergeboard, with the gable ends topped by small finials. The walls are clad in vertical board siding. A three-story square tower rises on the left side, topped by a flared pyramidal roof. A hip-roofed porch extends from the tower's left and around to the side, supported by turned posts with brackets.

The house was built in 1874 to a design by local architects Herbert and Balston Kenway. The Kenway brothers were Welsh immigrants, and the designed this house for William A. Robinson, a druggist from whom they received their first known commission, for his retail store. After three years of work (1873–75) the brothers both left the state. This commission represents a success translation of English ideas about Gothic architecture from the more traditional brick or stone into wood.

== See also ==
- National Register of Historic Places listings in Androscoggin County, Maine
