= Robinson House (Manassas, Virginia) =

- Robinson House, Manassas National Battlefield
- U.S. Historic district – Contributing property
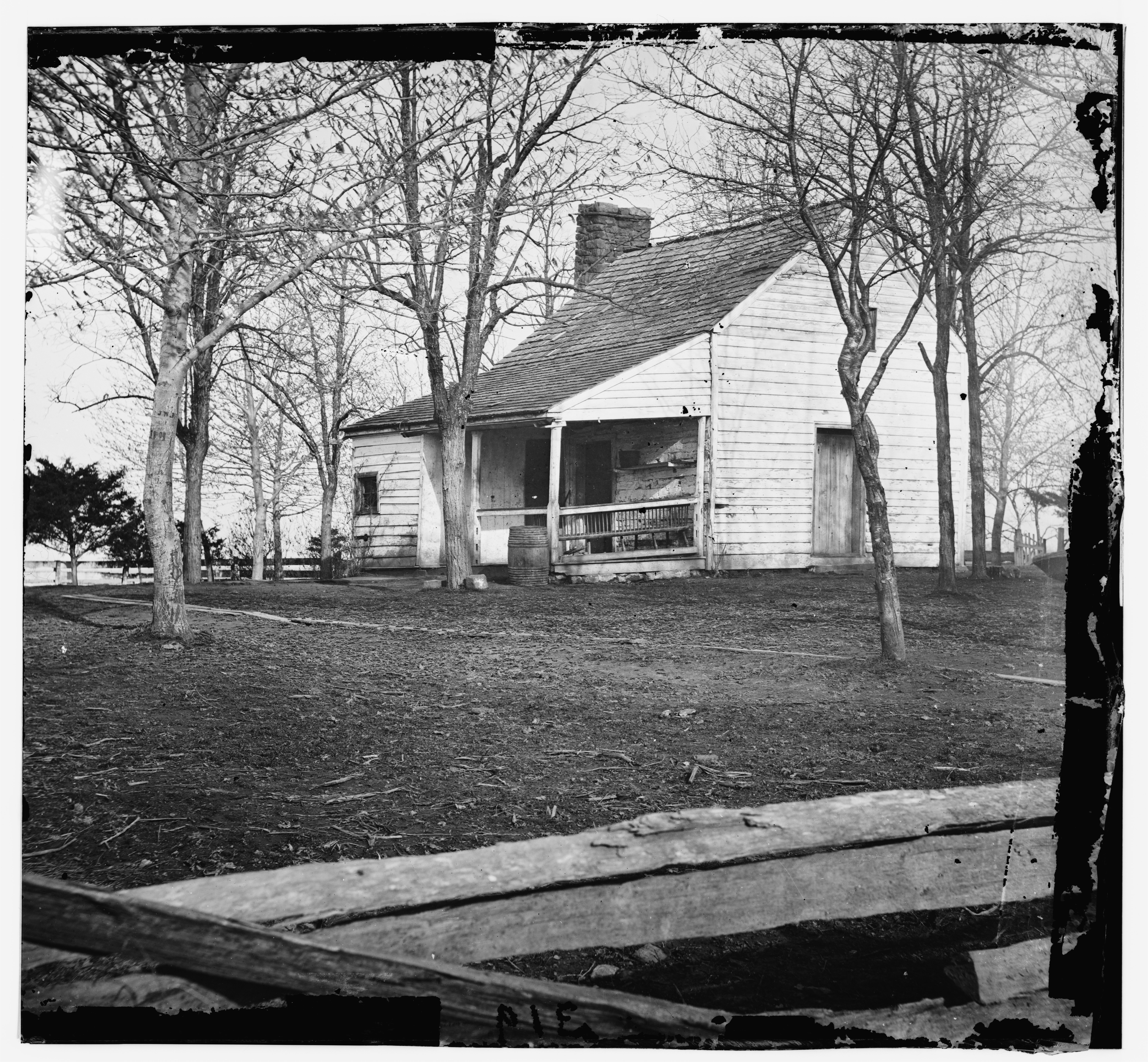
- George N. Barnard took this photo of the Robinson House in 1862.
- Location: Bull Run, Virginia
- Coordinates: 38°49′07.6″N 77°31′08.9″W
- Built: 1842
- Architect: James Robinson
- Part of: Manassas National Battlefield Park (ID66000039)

Robinson House sits at the bottom of Henry Hill, near Bull Run in Virginia. The house was named for the family of James "Gentleman Jim" Robinson, a free African American, who built the house. The Robinson family, descendants of Gentleman Jim, owned and occupied the house and a large portion of the land around it from the 1840s until 1936. The National Park Service acquired this parcel as part of their effort to commemorate two major battles of the American Civil War, the First and Second battles of Bull Run (also known as First and Second Manassas) which occurred about one year apart. Both battles were Confederate victories. However, Robinson House managed to survive virtually unscathed. The house would burn down in 1993.

== Pre-Civil War ==
The homestead was constructed in the 1840s by James "Gentleman Jim" Robinson, an African American, on land he purchased from local planter John Lee. James would become the third richest African American in the area.

As the son of Landon Carter, Jr. and a free African American woman, James received an education in his youth. In honor of the private tutor who taught him and the Carters' daughters Bladen and Tasco, he took the last name of his tutor as his own. Although he was born free, he was bound out for a period of time under the pretense of learning a trade. In fact, he worked as a field laborer during this time. After serving his time, he went to work for Thomas Hampton in Brentsville, Virginia, as a waiter in his tavern. He established a good relationship with Hampton, as indicated by the numerous formal contracts they entered into over a ten-year span. During this period, he used his earnings to add to his land holdings. In 1847, John Lee died. As was common throughout the United States at that time, Lee owned land and slaves, including Jim's wife and children. Upon his death, those family members who were still on his plantation were willed to Jim, who took them to live with him in his new home.

Around the same time Jim established his own roadhouse on the Warrenton Turnpike, the main road from Washington, D.C. to Richmond, Virginia, the capital of what would become the Confederacy. This was a prime location that would make him one of the wealthiest African Americans in the Manassas area, but would also bring the Civil War right into his front yard.

== Civil War ==
=== First Battle of Bull Run ===
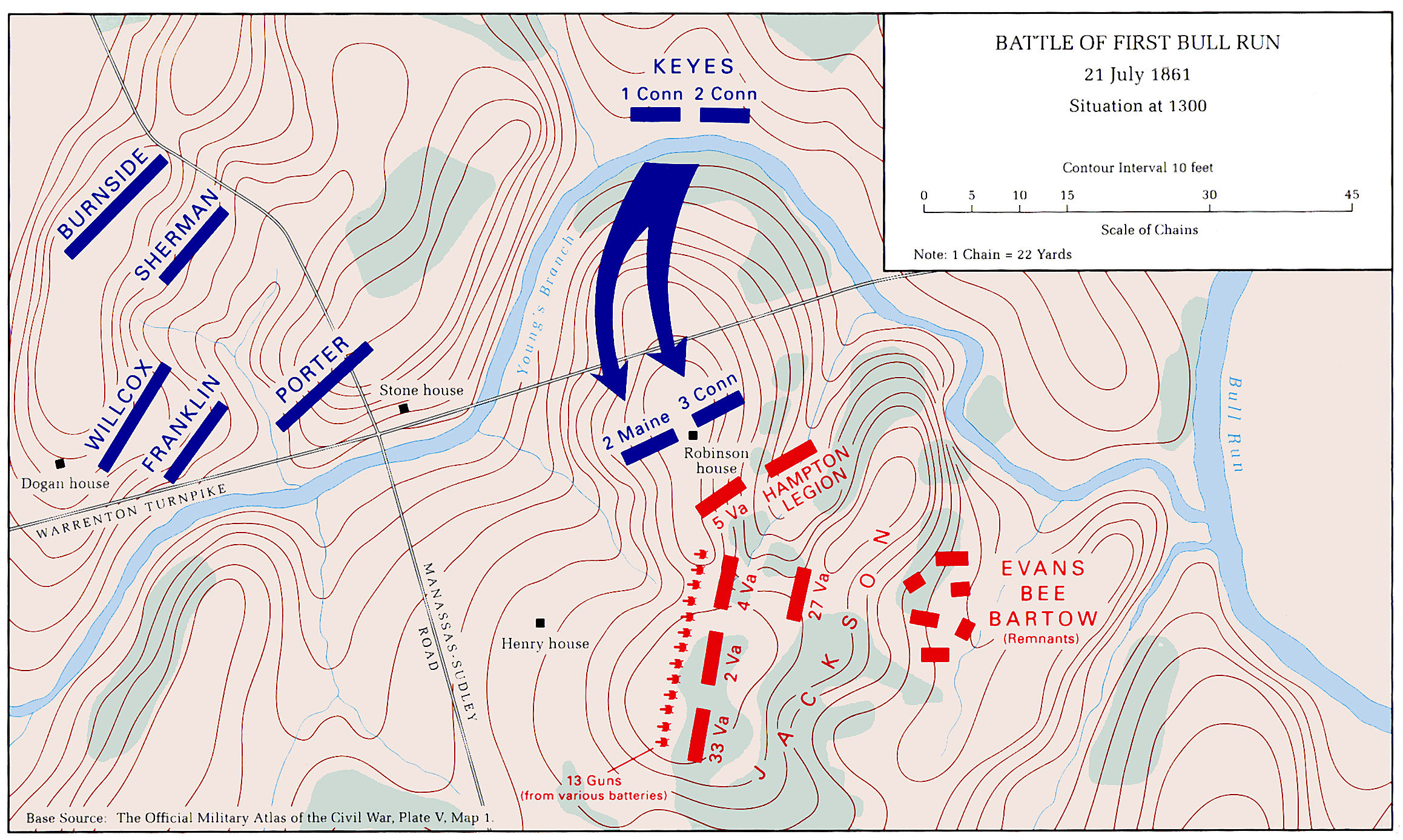
First Battle of Bull Run Map

Two major battles of the Civil War were waged around the Robinson House. During the First Battle of Bull Run the map to the right shows the troops of two brigadier generals engaging in a pitched battle, that resulted in a total rout of the Union Forces, under the command of Erasmus Keyes. The Confederate forces held their ground, under the command of Thomas J. Jackson, so well that from then on he would be known as Stonewall Jackson. His forces held the line on one side of the Robinson House as the Union troops attempted to overcome their stiff opposition.

Before the fighting began Gentleman Jim took his family to a neighbor's home where he hoped they would be safe. After securing the house Jim attempted to reunite with his family, but was caught in the crossfire of the battle and had to take shelter under a bridge over Young's Branch of the Bull Run River until hostilities ceased. That first battle left thousands of bodies littering the fields throughout Manassas. For days after the fighting was over, the Robinsons buried many in unmarked graves. Well into the 20th century family members reported that they were still digging up the bones of some of these soldiers.

The first battle was over in a matter of a few days. Many thought that the Civil War would be decided in one, winner take all battle. But this was not to be the case. Confederate troops won the First Battle of Manassas, with federal troops retreating back to Washington, D.C., but the Civil War continued.

=== Second Battle of Bull Run ===
The Second Battle of Bull Run lasted for about a week and also resulted in a Confederate victory. Again, Federal troops retreated back to Washington and the Confederates did not pursue. The casualties on both sides were even higher following this second battle. Pope and McClellan were strategically out maneuvered by Lee and Jackson, despite the fact that they had more troops.

Again the battle raged around Robinson House. Following the destruction of Henry House during the First Battle of Bull Run, Robinson House was one of the most strategically located buildings on the battlefield. Because of this it was used as a Union hospital and planning station. In sworn testimony before the Southern Claims Commission, Gentleman Jim described how following the battle, troops raided his farm in search of food and supplies, causing more than $2,000 in damages.

== Post-Civil War ==
=== Southern Claims Commission ===
On February 2, 1872, James Robinson presented his case to the Southern Claims Commission. This commission was set up to handle damage claims of property owners who were loyal to the Union. Jim's testimony, as well as that of the witnesses called in regarding his case, offered up valuable insights into the military maneuvers of the Union and Confederate troops. In the claim Jim and his neighbors detail how Union troops took food, livestock, fence posts, and goods from his house.

The house was also used as a field hospital for the wounded and dying, during the 2nd Battle of Bull Run. As one reporter put it,

The Robinson House is used as a Yankee hospital. In a visit there this morning, I found 100 of them [Yankees] packed in the rooms as thick as sardines. ... The wounds of the majority were undressed, the blood had dried upon their persons and garments, and altogether there (sic.) the most horrible set of beings it has been my lot to encounter.

=== After the death of Gentleman Jim ===
Following the death of Gentleman Jim in 1875, his son Alfred took over as head of the household. According to available census records, he moved in with his mother and other family members as the head of the Robinson clan, until his death in 1904. The house remained in the family up until 1936 when it was sold to the National Park Service (NPS). This site of the house and the surrounding property makes up an important part of the battlefield park today.

=== Manassas Battlefield Park ===
Robinson House was one of the few houses on the battlefield that was occupied during the 19th and 20th centuries. Even before the First Battle of Bull Run some of the other homes in the area, such as the Carter mansion at Pittsylvania, had been abandoned and fallen into disrepair. Henry House was completely demolished during the First Battle of Bull Run, killing its resident, Judith Carter Henry, in the process. Robinson House managed to remain intact in spite of its location in the center of heavy gunfire and artillery barrages.

Although the house was able to survive the Civil War, it was destroyed by arsonists in 1993. The perpetrators were never caught, but there was evidence that it was a hate crime. Apparently, just a few weeks prior to the destruction of the house someone had vandalized the structure with graffiti.

The National Park Service, in accordance with their current guidelines, has no plans to rebuild the structure, but they did conduct an archeological dig on the property, which resulted in the publication of the most significant document on the house and the family that owned and occupied it from pre-Civil War days into the early 20th century.

The site of Robinson House is preserved as part of the Manassas National Battlefield Park.
