= Clearwater, Texas =

- Unincorporated community
- Location within Texas Location within the United States
- Coordinates: 33°00′01″N 95°12′05″W
- Country: United States
- State: Texas
- County: Franklin
- Elevation: 446 ft (136 m)
- Time zone: UTC-6 (Central (CST))
  - Summer (DST): UTC-5 (CDT)
- Area codes: 903, 430
- GNIS feature ID: 1378128

Clearwater is an unincorporated community in Franklin County, Texas, United States.

== History ==
The community was named for the clear waters in the nearby Cypress Creek. White settlers arrived in the 1860s, but the community itself did not appear until the next decade. There was a sawmill, a gin, a store, and a church in the community in the 1930s. Its population was 25 in 1933, which grew to 50 by 1945. The community had a church, a cemetery, and several scattered homes in 1985.

== Geography ==
Clearwater is located on Farm to Market Road 1448, 12 mi (19 km) south of Mount Vernon in southern Franklin County. It was originally located between Cypress Creek and Dry Cypress Creek, but the streams were held back by Lake Cypress Springs and Lake Bob Sandlin.

== Education ==
The community had its own school in the 1930s. Today, Clearwater is served by the Mount Vernon Independent School District.

== In popular culture ==
- The 1965 the John Wayne film, The Sons of Katie Elder was set in Clearwater, Texas in 1898. Though the real town is 107 miles (172 km) east of Dallas in northeast Texas, the movie's version is obviously set in southwestern Texas).
- In the 2003 American Christian film, Christmas Child (based on Max Lucado's 1998 short story "The Christmas Cross", repackaged in 2003 as The Christmas Child: A Story of Coming Home), a Chicago journalist travels to Clearwater around Christmas time to discover his past.
- Texas playwright Cody Moree set his first and most popular stage play, Her Senior Year, (1998 I.E. Clark / Dramatic Publishing Company) in Clearwater, Texas.
