= Cypress, Franklin County, Texas =

- Unincorporated community
- Location within Texas Location within the United States
- Coordinates: 33°02′38″N 95°19′09″W
- Country: United States
- State: Texas
- County: Franklin
- Elevation: 423 ft (129 m)
- Time zone: UTC-6 (Central (CST))
  - Summer (DST): UTC-5 (CDT)
- Area codes: 903, 430
- GNIS feature ID: 1379627

Cypress is an unincorporated community in Franklin County, in the U.S. state of Texas. According to the Handbook of Texas, the community had a population of 20 in 2000.

== History ==
The area in what is now known as Cypress today was first settled in the 1850s and was named for the nearby Cypress Creek, which flowed through the community until Lake Cypress Springs was impounded. There were two businesses, a church, and a cemetery in the community in the 1930s. There were no businesses in the community as of 1990 and it had a population of 20 in 2000.

== Geography ==
Cypress is located on Texas State Highway 37, 10 mi (16 km) southwest of Mount Vernon in southwestern Franklin County.

== Education ==
In 1896, Cypress had a school with one teacher and 50 students. It also had a school in the 1930s. Today, the community is served by the Mount Vernon Independent School District.
