= Robert Whiteside =

American jeweller

Robert King Whiteside
- Born: March 26, 1950; Tupelo, Mississippi
- Died: October 30, 2006 (aged 56); Mount Vernon, Texas
- Cause of death: Murder
- Occupation: Artist/craftsman

Robert Whiteside (March 26, 1950 – October 30, 2006) was an American artist known for re-creations of Fabergé eggs for celebrities and dignitaries across the globe. His talents extended well beyond that of an artist; many considered him a modern Renaissance man. He was a musician, painter, chef, pilot, and a restaurant owner on his 68-acre (280,000 m^{2}) bed and breakfast, the Veranda. Whiteside's works have been granted as Gifts of State from the Reagan Administration, which also held a collection.

== Early life ==
Robert Whiteside was born on March 26, 1950, in Tupelo, Mississippi, but was raised primarily in Texas. He moved to Dallas with his family at age 10; by that time they had already lived in thirteen states. By age 13, Robert was passionate about being a musician. His primary instrument, clarinet, would become his major at North Texas State University; he also played cello, flute, oboe, and saxophone as a youth.

== Career ==
After college, Whiteside pursued the study of musical-instrument repair. Whiteside first began metal work for musical instruments at the McCord Music Company in downtown Dallas, then quickly ventured on to goldsmithing. He was first introduced to Fabergé eggs in 1972; in the same year he opened his first studio in Dallas. He obtained machines made in mid-19th century Europe to create his eggs, which have been valued from $100 to $50,000. Whiteside also produced guilloché enamel, also made famous by Fabergé, which is an engraved pattern resembling moire silk that is seen through a translucent or clear enamel. Guilloché enamel was produced from the 18th century to about 1950 and is considered rare. Whiteside was also an instrument-rated private pilot and a member of the Rainbow Pilots Association. Another skill of Whiteside's was in the culinary arts. He attended the Culinary Institute of New York and had also trained with his friends such as Christian Svalesen, who are chefs in Dallas. Whiteside founded his own restaurant, which was located on the Veranda, and was a chef who could rival those of five-star restaurants.

Two of the most memorable moments for Whiteside were going to the White House to meet President Ronald Reagan and the First Lady, and meeting Audrey Hepburn. Whiteside met Hepburn when he was chosen during a UNICEF fundraiser to create a frame to house an autographed picture of Hepburn as Holly Golightly in Breakfast at Tiffany's. Much of the work produced by Whiteside was presented to and owned by the Reagan administration; other individuals include Lady Bird Johnson and several dignitaries, including Queen Silvia of Sweden, Crown Princess Michiko of Japan and the wives of Chancellor Helmut Kohl of West Germany, Prime Minister Yasuhiro Nakasone of Japan, Prime Minister Jacques Chirac of France, Prime Minister Brian Mulroney of Canada, President José Napoleón Duarte of El Salvador and President José Sarney of Brazil. Another important event for Whiteside was a commercial for Lincoln Mercury. The original intent for the commercial was to have Malcolm Forbes lend the Fabergé Coronation egg; however, curator Margaret Kelly suggested that the car company contact Whiteside to use one of his eggs in order to avoid the expensive insurance and security that would have been necessary to obtain the Fabergé Coronation egg.

In 1992, Whiteside purchased the old Johnson farm house, which was located on the western outskirts of Mount Vernon, Texas, and moved it to a 68-acre (280,000 m^{2}) estate located off FM 21, near Hopewell in south-central Franklin County in the Piney Woods of East Texas. In 1995, Whiteside moved his Dallas studio on Inwood Road and Lovers Lane to a shop he built on the Veranda property. He continued to work on his art projects there. He opened up the Veranda Bed, Breakfast and Restaurant in 1998.

Whiteside was an artist and humanitarian. He was a participant in community awareness support and services. One of his last activities for his community was setting up a foundation for the development, teaching and performance of music. He was the appointed director of the Mt. Vernon Music board. Whiteside, along with the founders of this venue, had the goal of raising money for the purpose of supporting and stimulating awareness in the community for the need of music. Whiteside also participated in various teaching positions from table etiquette for the competitors in the Miss Mount Vernon Scholarship Pageant to metallurgy for a group of welders.

Whiteside was known for donating his abilities. In 1987, Whiteside, along with Gump's, created Faberge-inspired table settings for the Crystal Charity Ball. The table setting theme created for six consisted of gilded sterling silver and royal blue guilloché enamel. The items created for this event were six place card holders enhanced by a small vermeil bow and two cultured pearl feet, six pair of salt and pepper shakers accented by four cultured pearl feet, six cylindrical columned candlesticks, six napkin rings accented at each edge by a vermeil border, and a Fabergé-inspired presentation egg mounted on a Brazilian rock crystal base. The Fabergé egg was hinged with clock movement contained within the lid for display when the egg was opened. Whiteside also contributed to the Fighting AIDS fundraiser by designing a jacket for Design Industries Foundation that had sold for a large amount. Another display Whiteside created was at the invitation of Anita Madden of Louisville, Kentucky. Whiteside's work was representative of the Kentucky Derby Eve Party. He described the theme of his work as "horsy".

== Death ==
On Wednesday, November 1, 2006, Robert Whiteside, aged 56, was found by his partner, Warren Butler, murdered at the Veranda. It was apparent that the murder occurred during a robbery the night of October 30. The shooter, Mark Aaron Rains, a 21-year-old local once employed by Whiteside to help in his kitchen, was quickly found and arrested in Dallas based on evidence of his repeated use of Whiteside's credit card at a local gas station. Rains, who admitted three times to the crime, was convicted. He escaped once from jail. In exchange for the release of friends who aided in his escape and in order to avoid the death sentence, Rains pleaded guilty on July 1, 2008, at the Franklin County Courthouse. He was sentenced to life imprisonment without possibility of parole. The second assailant, Jose Chavez, was arrested days later and pleaded guilty in February 2009. A third suspect, Elbis Torres, 28, also known as "Cuz," was arrested in Cockrell Hill, Texas, on October 28, 2008. He entered a guilty plea on March 24, 2009. Instead of a funeral, Butler and Whiteside's brother Harry decided on a simple service at the pond located on the Veranda property. Butler has lived at the Veranda since Whiteside's death. The business closed at the end of 2009.
