= Hagansport, Texas =

- Unincorporated community
- Location within Texas Location within the United States
- Coordinates: 33°20′28″N 95°15′08″W
- Country: United States
- State: Texas
- County: Franklin
- Elevation: 381 ft (116 m)
- Time zone: UTC-6 (Central (CST))
  - Summer (DST): UTC-5 (CDT)
- Area codes: 903, 430
- GNIS feature ID: 1358621

Hagansport is an unincorporated community in Franklin County, Texas, United States. According to the Handbook of Texas, the community had a population of 40 in 2000.

== History ==
The name derives from an early settler by the name of Hagan, who established a crossing on the Sulphur River. Hagan's Port eventually became one word, Hagansport. This was the spelling of the name by the time the first post office was established in 1857. F.M. Sims was the postmaster. The community grew to around 150 by the 1880s and had a post office, gin, sawmill, and other businesses. The population has gradually declined since then, resulting in the closing of the post office, which reopened in 1876, but then closed permanently in 1929. The community had a sawmill, two churches, four businesses, and 125 residents in the 1930s. It then had three churches, only one business, and a population of 40 in 1985. In 2000, the population was estimated at forty.

As of 2020, Hagansport had one church, a community center, a cemetery, and a general store. It is also the site of the Annual Hagansport Fall Farm Equipment and Horse Auction which draws visitors from all over East Texas.

== Geography ==
It is located at the junction of State Highway 37 and Farm to Market Road 71, eleven miles northwest of the county seat, Mount Vernon. During its history, Hagansport moved a mile east from its present location.

=== Climate ===
The climate in this area is characterized by hot, humid summers and generally mild to cool winters. According to the Köppen Climate Classification system, Hagansport has a humid subtropical climate, abbreviated "Cfa" on climate maps.

== Education ==
Hagansport had a one-room school with one teacher and 69 students in 1896 and opened in 1884. It remained into the 1930s. Today, the community is served by the Mount Vernon Independent School District.
