= Lakeview, Franklin County, Texas =

- Unincorporated community
- Location within Texas Location within the United States
- Coordinates: 33°17′44″N 95°14′44″W
- Country: United States
- State: Texas
- County: Franklin
- Elevation: 361 ft (110 m)
- Time zone: UTC-6 (Central (CST))
  - Summer (DST): UTC-5 (CDT)
- Area codes: 903, 430
- GNIS feature ID: 2034845

Lakeview is an unincorporated community in Franklin County, Texas, United States. According to the Handbook of Texas, the community had a population of 30 in 2000.

== History ==
Lakeview had two churches in the 1930s. There were several scattered houses in 1985. Its population was 30 in 2000.

== Geography ==
Lakeview is located on Texas State Highway 37, 8 mi (13 km) northwest of Mount Vernon in northwestern Franklin County.

== Education ==
In 1896, Lakeview had a school with one teacher and 35 White students. It remained in the 1930s. Today, the community is served by the Mount Vernon Independent School District.
