= Daphne, Texas =

- Unincorporated community
- Location within Texas Location within the United States
- Coordinates: 33°16′00″N 95°07′47″W
- Country: United States
- State: Texas
- County: Franklin
- Elevation: 381 ft (116 m)
- Time zone: UTC-6 (Central (CST))
  - Summer (DST): UTC-5 (CDT)
- Area codes: 903, 430
- GNIS feature ID: 1379635

Daphne is an unincorporated community in Franklin County, Texas, United States.

== History ==
The area in what is known as Daphne today was first settled in the 1850s. A post office was established at Daphne in 1895 and remained in operation until 1906, with mail being delivered to the community via special supply from Mount Vernon. All that remained in the community was a community center and several scattered houses in 1985.

== Geography ==
Daphne is located on Farm to Market Road 1896, 8 mi (13 km) northeast of Mount Vernon in northeastern Franklin County.

== Education ==
Today, the community is served by the Mount Vernon Independent School District.
