= Purley, Texas =

- Unincorporated community
- Location within Texas Location within the United States
- Coordinates: 33°05′28″N 95°15′44″W
- Country: United States
- State: Texas
- County: Franklin
- Elevation: 525 ft (160 m)

Population (2000)
  - Total: 81
- Time zone: UTC-6 (Central (CST))
  - Summer (DST): UTC-5 (CDT)
- Area codes: 430 & 903
- GNIS feature ID: 1365865

Purley is an unincorporated community in Franklin County, Texas, United States. According to the Handbook of Texas, the community had a population of 81 in 2000.

== History ==
Purley was first settled in the 1850s. A post office opened in Purley in 1879 and had several stores, four sawmills and gristmills, and 150 residents. A mattress manufacturer was in the community in 1896. The community diminished in the 1900s, falling to a population of twenty with no businesses by 1966. The population of Purley grew to 81 by 1972, where it remained through 2000; a business opened in the community in 1988.

== Geography ==
Purley is located at the junction of Texas State Highway 37 and Farm to Market Road 900, 7 miles (11 km) south of Mount Vernon.

== Education ==
Purley had a school with one teacher and 66 students in 1896. Today, the community is served by the Mount Vernon Independent School District.
