= Eureka, Franklin County, Texas =

- Unincorporated community
- Location within Texas Location within the United States
- Coordinates: 33°20′57″N 95°18′22″W
- Country: United States
- State: Texas
- County: Franklin
- Elevation: 371 ft (113 m)
- Time zone: UTC-6 (Central (CST))
  - Summer (DST): UTC-5 (CDT)
- Area codes: 903, 430
- GNIS feature ID: 1379741

Eureka is an unincorporated community in Franklin County, Texas, United States. According to the Handbook of Texas, the community had a population of 18 in 2000.

== History ==
Eureka had a church and one business in the 1930s. There were several scattered houses in 1985. Its population was 18 in 2000. There are two cemeteries near Eureka: Fairview and Pierce's Chapel cemeteries.

== Geography ==
Eureka is located 12 mi (19 km) northwest of Mount Vernon in northwestern Franklin County. It sits near the Hopkins County line.

== Education ==
In 1896, Eureka had a school with one teacher and 37 students. It remained in the 1930s. Today, the community is served by the Mount Vernon Independent School District.
