= Macon, Texas =

- Unincorporated community
- Location within Texas Location within the United States
- Coordinates: 33°05′19″N 95°07′40″W
- Country: United States
- State: Texas
- County: Franklin
- Elevation: 456 ft (139 m)
- Time zone: UTC-6 (Central (CST))
  - Summer (DST): UTC-5 (CDT)
- Area codes: 903, 430
- GNIS feature ID: 1378632

Macon is an unincorporated community in Franklin County, Texas, United States.

== Geography ==
Macon is located at the intersection of Farm to Market Roads 21 and 3007, 8 mi (13 km) away from Mount Vernon in southeastern Franklin County.

== Education ==
Macon had its own school in the 1930s. Today, the community is served by the Mount Vernon Independent School District.
