= Majors, Texas =

- Unincorporated community
- Location within Texas Location within the United States
- Coordinates: 33°06′10″N 95°13′11″W
- Country: United States
- State: Texas
- County: Franklin
- Elevation: 479 ft (146 m)
- Time zone: UTC-6 (Central (CST))
  - Summer (DST): UTC-5 (CDT)
- Area codes: 903, 430
- GNIS feature ID: 1378636

Majors is an unincorporated community in Franklin County, Texas, United States. According to the Handbook of Texas, the community had a population of 13 in 2000.

== History ==
The community was named after J.H. Majors, who operated a bank in Mount Vernon. A post office operated in the community between 1899 and 1906. According to a 1985 county highway map, there was once a sawmill in operation near the community.

== Geography ==
Majors is located at the intersections of Farm to Market Roads 3122 and 115, 6 mi (9.7 km) south of Mount Vernon in southern Franklin County.

== Education ==
Majors had its own school in the 1930s. Today, the community is served by the Mount Vernon Independent School District.
