= Butch Maples =

American football player (1941–2014)

No. 53
- Position: Linebacker

Personal information
- Born: January 28, 1941; Mount Vernon, Texas, U.S.
- Died: March 29, 2014 (aged 73)
- Listed height: 6 ft 4 in (1.93 m)
- Listed weight: 225 lb (102 kg)

Career information
- High school: Mount Vernon (TX)
- College: Baylor
- NFL draft: 1963: 12th round, 159th overall pick
- AFL draft: 1963: 13th round, 101st overall pick

Career history
- Baltimore Colts (1963)
- Stats at Pro Football Reference

James Harold Maples (January 28, 1941 – March 29, 2014) was an American football linebacker who played college football for Baylor and professional football in the National Football League (NFL) for the Baltimore Colts during the 1963 season.

== Early life ==
A native of Mount Vernon, Texas, he played college football at Baylor University.

== Professional football ==
He played professional football for the Baltimore Colts during the 1963 season, appearing in five NFL games. He suffered injuries that required two operations on his knees and prevented him from appearing in the second half of the 1963 season or in any games during the 1964 season. He was traded to the Pittsburgh Steelers in July 1965.

== Later life ==
After retiring from football, Maples lived in McAllen, Texas, and worked in retail management. He died in 2014 at age 73.

His brother Bobby Maples also played in the NFL.
