= Rivercrest High School =

Rivercrest High School may refer to:

- Rivercrest High School (Arkansas), located in Mississippi County, Arkansas (near Wilson).
- Rivercrest High School (Texas), located in Bogata, Texas.
