= Hopewell, Franklin County, Texas =

- Unincorporated community
- Location within Texas Location within the United States
- Coordinates: 33°07′06″N 95°09′21″W
- Country: United States
- State: Texas
- County: Franklin
- Elevation: 482 ft (147 m)
- Time zone: UTC-6 (Central (CST))
  - Summer (DST): UTC-5 (CDT)
- Area codes: 903, 430
- GNIS feature ID: 1378469

Hopewell is an unincorporated community in Franklin County, Texas, United States. According to the Handbook of Texas, the community had a population of 35 in 2000.

== History ==
The first settlers arrived in the area in the 1850s but the community itself was not founded until the 1880s. It had two churches, a cemetery, and several scattered homes in the 1930s. Its first population was recorded at 35 in the 1970s. There was a town hall, a cemetery, and several scattered homes in Hopewell in 1985. Its population remained at only 35 in 2000.

== Geography ==
Hopewell is located on Farm to Market Road 21, 6 mi (9.7 km) southeast of Mount Vernon in southeastern Franklin County.

== Education ==
There were two schools in Hopewell in 1896, with one having 60 White students and two teachers, and the other having 22 Black students and one teacher. The Black school was one of five in Franklin County. It had only one school in the 1930s. Today, the community is served by the Mount Vernon Independent School District.
