= National Register of Historic Places listings in Franklin County, Texas =

Location of Franklin County in Texas

This is a list of the National Register of Historic Places listings in Franklin County, Texas.

This is intended to be a complete list of properties listed on the National Register of Historic Places in Franklin County, Texas. There are four properties listed on the National Register in the county. One property is a State Antiquities Landmark while another is a Recorded Texas Historic Landmark.

This National Park Service list is complete through NPS recent listings posted March 21, 2025.

== Current listings ==
The locations of National Register properties may be seen in a mapping service provided.

	Name on the Register	Image	Date listed	Location	City or town	Description
1	M.L. Edwards & Co. Building	M.L. Edwards & Co. Building	August 29, 2018 (#100002840)	103 N Kaufman St. 33°11′20″N 95°13′19″W	Mount Vernon	
2	Franklin County Courthouse and Jail	Franklin County Courthouse and Jail	January 18, 2006 (#05001542)	200 N Kaufman St. 33°11′21″N 95°13′16″W	Mount Vernon	State Antiquities Landmark
3	Mount Vernon Downtown Historic District	Mount Vernon Downtown Historic District	November 21, 2018 (#100003140)	Roughly bounded by RR tracks, Jackson, Taylor & Holbrook Sts; 33°11′19″N 95°13′18″W	Mount Vernon	State Antiquities Landmark
4	Rogers-Drummond House		September 8, 1980 (#80004120)	SE of Mount Vernon; 33°07′06″N 95°09′11″W	Mount Vernon	Recorded Texas Historic Landmark

== See also ==
- National Register of Historic Places listings in Texas
- Recorded Texas Historic Landmarks in Franklin County
