= New Hope, Franklin County, Texas =

- Unincorporated community
- Location within Texas Location within the United States
- Coordinates: 33°01′05″N 95°10′09″W
- Country: United States
- State: Texas
- County: Franklin
- Elevation: 417 ft (127 m)
- Time zone: UTC-6 (Central (CST))
  - Summer (DST): UTC-5 (CDT)
- Area codes: 903, 430
- GNIS feature ID: 1378745

New Hope is an unincorporated community in Franklin County, Texas, United States.

== History ==
New Hope had a church, a store, and several scattered houses in the 1930s. The only population recorded for the community was 20 in 1940. The community had a church and several scattered houses in 1988.

== Geography ==
New Hope is located on Farm to Market Road 1448, 8 mi (13 km) northeast of Winnsboro in southeastern Franklin County.

== Education ==
In 1896, New Hope had a school with one teacher and 77 White students. There were two schools in the community in the 1930s. Today, the community is served by the Mount Vernon Independent School District.
