= Rivercrest High School (Texas) =

Location
- 4126 US Highway 271 South; Bogata, Texas 75417-9999; United States; 33.410872°N 95.162019°W

Information
- School type: Public high school
- School district: Rivercrest Independent School District
- Principal: Chris McClure
- Staff: 26.29 (FTE)
- Grades: 9-12
- Enrollment: 208 (2023–2024)
- Student to teacher ratio: 7.91
- Colors: Blue, black, and white
- Athletics conference: UIL Class AA
- Mascot: Rebel
- Website: Rivercrest High School website

Rivercrest High School is a 2A public high school located in Bogata, Texas (USA). It is part of the Rivercrest Independent School District located in southwest Red River County and northwest Titus County and a small portion of Franklin County. It was created by the consolidation of Bogata and neighboring Talco in Titus County. In 2011, the school was rated "Academically Acceptable" by the Texas Education Agency.

== Athletics ==
The Rivercrest Rebels compete in the following sports:

- Baseball
- Basketball
- Football
- Golf
- Powerlifting
- Softball
- Tennis
- Track and field
- Volleyball
- Band

=== State Titles ===
- Boys Basketball -
  - 2006(1A/D1)
- Girls Basketball -
  - 1968(2A), 1980(1A)
- Marching Band
  - 2023(2A), 2024(2A)

==== State Finalists ====
- Girls Basketball -
  - 1979(1A)
