= Talco, Texas =

Town in Titus County, Texas, United States

- City
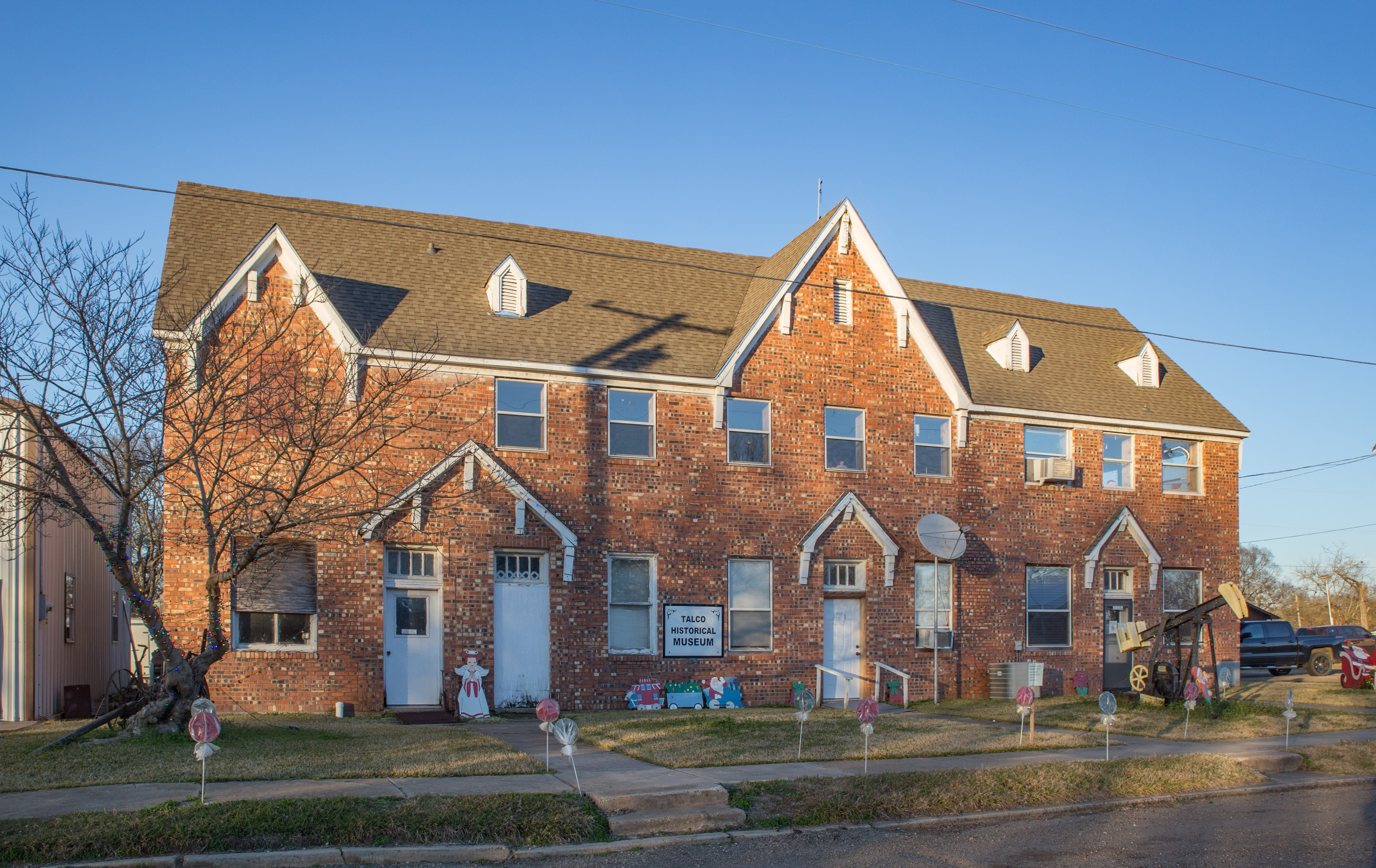
- Talco City Hall, December 2019

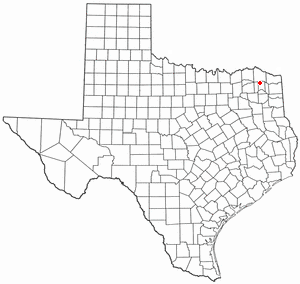
- Location of Talco, Texas

- Coordinates: 33°21′46″N 95°06′12″W
- Country: United States
- State: Texas
- County: Titus

Area
  - Total: 0.77 sq mi (1.99 km^{2})
  - Land: 0.76 sq mi (1.98 km^{2})
  - Water: 0 sq mi (0.00 km^{2})
- Elevation: 361 ft (110 m)

Population (2020)
  - Total: 494
  - Density: 646/sq mi (249/km^{2})
- Time zone: UTC-6 (Central (CST))
  - Summer (DST): UTC-5 (CDT)
- Zip Code: 75487
- Area codes: 903, 430
- FIPS code: 48-71732
- GNIS feature ID: 2412030
- Website: cityoftalco.com

Talco is a city in Titus County, Texas, United States. The population was 494 at the 2020 census. The name is derived either from that of a local candy bar or from the local people's saying it was "Texas-Arkansas-Louisiana country", hence Talco. Other reports say that it may have been from a local company name, Texas-Arkansas-Louisiana Company.

== History ==
Two post offices were established near the current site of Talco: Gouldsboro in 1856, and Goolesboro in 1878. Due to name conflict, the community changed its name to "Talco" based on the Texas, Arkansas, and Louisiana Candy Company initials on a candy wrapper. In 1912, Talco relocated to be closer to a railroad line.

Oil was discovered in 1936, leading to a big boom in the economy. Talco called itself the "asphalt capital of the world."

== Geography ==
According to the United States Census Bureau, the city has a total area of 0.8 square mile (2.0 km^{2}), all land.

US Route 271 is the major north–south highway passing through Talco. The community is one mile east of the Franklin County line.

== Demographics ==
Historical population
| Census | Pop. | Note | %± |
|---|---|---|---|
| 1940 | 912 | | — |
| 1950 | 917 | | 0.5% |
| 1960 | 1,024 | | 11.7% |
| 1970 | 837 | | −18.3% |
| 1980 | 751 | | −10.3% |
| 1990 | 592 | | −21.2% |
| 2000 | 570 | | −3.7% |
| 2010 | 516 | | −9.5% |
| 2020 | 494 | | −4.3% |
U.S. Decennial Census

=== 2020 census ===
As of the 2020 census, Talco had a population of 494 people and 206 families residing in the city. The median age was 34.1 years; 28.5% of residents were under the age of 18 and 11.9% were 65 years of age or older. For every 100 females there were 92.2 males, and for every 100 females age 18 and over there were 95.0 males age 18 and over.

0.0% of residents lived in urban areas, while 100.0% lived in rural areas.

There were 197 households in Talco, of which 43.1% had children under the age of 18 living in them. Of all households, 34.0% were married-couple households, 25.9% were households with a male householder and no spouse or partner present, and 29.4% were households with a female householder and no spouse or partner present. About 24.9% of all households were made up of individuals and 9.2% had someone living alone who was 65 years of age or older.

There were 247 housing units, of which 20.2% were vacant. The homeowner vacancy rate was 1.7% and the rental vacancy rate was 3.6%.

Racial composition as of the 2020 census (NH = Non-Hispanic) (Note: Note: the US Census treats Hispanic/Latino as an ethnic category. This table excludes Latinos from the racial categories and assigns them to a separate category. Hispanics/Latinos can be of any race.)
| Race | Number | Percent |
|---|---|---|
| White | 255 | 51.6% |
| Black or African American | 84 | 17.0% |
| American Indian and Alaska Native | 11 | 2.2% |
| Asian | 0 | 0.0% |
| Native Hawaiian and Other Pacific Islander | 0 | 0.0% |
| Some other race | 81 | 16.4% |
| Two or more races | 63 | 12.8% |
| Hispanic or Latino (of any race) | 156 | 31.6% |

== Education ==
The City of Talco is served by the Rivercrest Independent School District (Talco-Bogata Consolidated Independent School District prior to July 1999).

It previously maintained Talco Elementary. The previous Talco school opened in 1939. The district began construction of the consolidated elementary on May 1, 2000 and the scheduled completion was in June 2001.

== See also ==
- List of municipalities in Texas
