= Bobby Maples =

American football player (1942–1991)

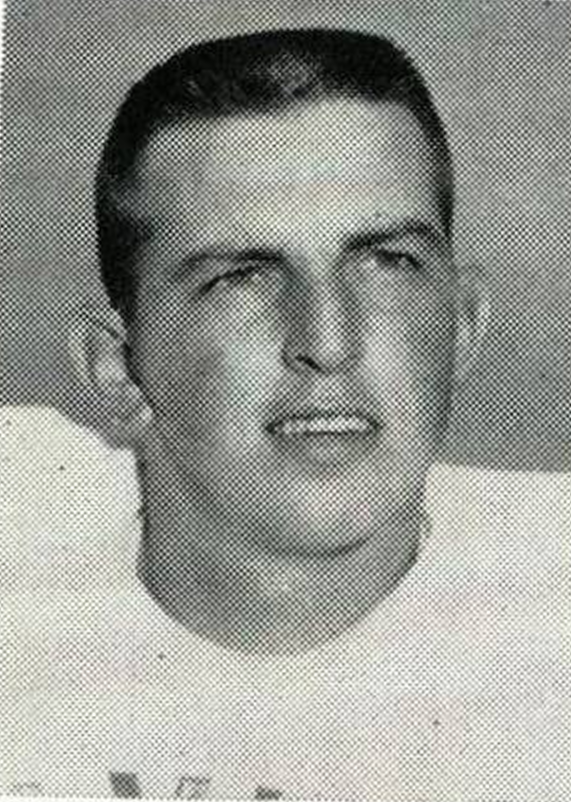
- Maples, c. 1964

No. 50, 51
- Positions: Center, Linebacker

Personal information
- Born: December 28, 1942; Mount Vernon, Texas, U.S.
- Died: February 16, 1991 (aged 48); Sugar Land, Texas, U.S.
- Listed height: 6 ft 3 in (1.91 m)
- Listed weight: 250 lb (113 kg)

Career information
- High school: Mount Vernon
- College: Baylor (1961-1964)
- NFL draft: 1965: 3rd round, 41st overall pick
- AFL draft: 1965: 4th round, 26th overall pick

Career history
- Houston Oilers (1965-1970); Pittsburgh Steelers (1971); Denver Broncos (1972–1978)

Awards and highlights
- Second-team All-AFL (1967); AFL All-Star (1968)

Career NFL/AFL statistics
- Games played: 184
- Games started: 134
- Fumble recoveries: 5
- Interceptions: 1
- Stats at Pro Football Reference

Bobby Ray Maples (December 28, 1942 – February 16, 1991) was an American professional football center and linebacker. He was born in Mount Vernon, Texas, which is also the birthplace of Don Meredith. Maples and his older brother Butch played collegiately for Baylor University and for respectively for NFL & AFL teams. Bobby Maples played professionally in the American Football League (AFL) where he was an All-Star in 1968 with the Houston Oilers He also played for the National Football League (NFL)'s Pittsburgh Steelers and Denver Broncos before retiring in 1978.

Maples died of Hodgkin's disease in February, 1991.

== See also ==
- Other American Football League Players
