= Texas State Highway 37 =

State highway in Wood, Franklin, and Red River counties in Texas, United States

State Highway 37

Route information
- Maintained by TxDOT
- Length: 92.293 mi (148.531 km)
- Existed: 1939–present

Major junctions
- South end: US 69 in Mineola
- I-30 at Mount Vernon; US 67 at Mount Vernon; US 271 in Bogata; US 82 in Clarksville
- North end: SH-37 at Albion

Location
- Country: United States
- State: Texas

Highway system
- Highways in Texas; Interstate; US; State; Former; Toll; Loops; Spurs; FM/RM; Park; Rec
← I-37	→ SH 38

State Highway 37 is a state highway that runs from US 69 in Mineola to the Oklahoma state line in the northeast corner of the state.

== History ==
Historic SH 37

SH 37 was designated as a route on April 13, 1918 from Clarksville to Lufkin. On August 21, 1923, it was pared back, with everything north of Mt. Vernon either cancelled or transferred to the new SH 66, and the portion from Jacksonville to Lufkin transferred to SH 40. On May 23, 1927, it was extended north to Talco. On June 24, 1931, it was extended north to the Oklahoma state line, replacing SH 66. On July 15, 1935, everything north of Clarksville was cancelled (as it was not built yet). The section north of Clarksville was restored on December 20, 1937. On September 26, 1939, the stretch from Mineola to Tyler was transferred to U.S. Highway 69 (Cosigned with since 1934), with the remaining route continuing to the present.

SH 37A was designated on January 19, 1920 as a spur from Tyler to Troup. This was cancelled on November 27, 1922. SH 37A was restored on February 18, 1924, but from Tyler to New Summerfield. It was cancelled on March 19, 1930, as it became part of SH 110.

SH 37A was also designated on April 23, 1929 from Quitman to Cooper. This was renumbered to SH 154 on March 19, 1930.

== Major intersections ==
County	Location	mi	km	Destinations	Notes
Wood	Mineola	0.0	0.0	US 69 – Lindale, Tyler, Alba, Greenville	Southern terminus
Wood	Mineola	1.0	1.6	Loop 564	
Wood		6.0	9.7	FM 779 west – Golden	
Wood	Quitman	8.6	13.8	FM 778 south (Horton Street) – Mainesville	
Wood	Quitman	8.8	14.2	SH 154 west / SH 182 west – Sulphur Springs, Lake Fork	South end of SH 154 overlap; western terminus of SH 182
Wood	Quitman	8.9	14.3	Loop 173 east / FM 2966 north (North Main Street) – Lake Quitman	
Wood	Quitman	9.2	14.8	SH 154 east – Gilmer	North end of SH 154 overlap
Wood	Quitman	9.4	15.1	Loop 173 west (East Lane Street)	
Wood	Quitman	9.8	15.8	FM 2088 east (Oak Grove Road)	
Wood		12.1	19.5	FM 69 north – Coke	
Wood		15.8	25.4	FM 1643 north – Cartwright	
Wood		17.9	28.8	FM 14 south – Hawkins	
Wood	Winnsboro	24.1	38.8	FM 515 – Coke, Pittsburg	Access to CHRISTUS Mother Frances Hospital - Winnsboro
Wood	Winnsboro	24.7	39.8	SH 11 / FM 852	
Franklin		27.7	44.6	FM 3357 east	
Franklin	Purley	34.2	55.0	FM 900 – Purley, Saltillo	
Franklin		38.3	61.6	FM 21 south – Lake Cypress Springs, Lake Bob Sandlin	
Franklin	Mount Vernon	39.3	63.2	I-30 – Dallas, Texarkana	I-30 exit 146
Franklin	Mount Vernon	40.9	65.8	US 67 south	South end of US 67 overlap
Franklin	Mount Vernon	41.2	66.3	US 67 north / Bus. SH 37 north – Mount Vernon, Mount Pleasant	North end of US 67 overlap
Franklin		42.4	68.2	Bus. SH 37 south – Mount Vernon	
Franklin		52.0	83.7	FM 71 – Sulphur Bluff, Talco	
Red River		56.0	90.1	FM 196 west – Cunningham	
Red River	Bogata	61.1	98.3	FM 909 north	
Red River	Bogata	61.4	98.8	US 271 – Paris, Mount Pleasant	
Red River	Bogata	61.8	99.5	Bus. US 271	
Red River	Bogata	62.2	100.1	Spur 38 south	
Red River		65.9	106.1	FM 411 west – Fulbright	
Red River		73.4	118.1	FM 2825 north	
Red River		74.5	119.9	Bus. SH 37 north – Clarksville	
Red River	Clarksville	75.4	121.3	US 82 west / Bus. US 82 east – Paris, Clarksville	South end of US 82 overlap
Red River	Clarksville	76.8	123.6	US 82 east / Bus. SH 37 south – New Boston, Clarksville	Interchange; north end of US 82 overlap
Red River		80.1	128.9	FM 2283 west	
Red River		83.5	134.4	FM 2120 west – Bagwell	
Red River		86.8	139.7	FM 2118 west – Manchester	
Red River		93.0	149.7	FM 1159 south	
Red River	Albion	93.8	151.0	FM 195 west – Paris	
Red River	Albion	93.9	151.1	SH-37 east – Idabel	Continuation into Oklahoma
1.000 mi = 1.609 km; 1.000 km = 0.621 mi: Concurrency terminus

== Business routes ==
SH 37 has two business routes.

=== Clarksville business loop ===
Business State Highway 37-C is a business loop that runs through Clarksville. The road was bypassed in 1992 by SH 37. It is concurrent with Business US 82.

=== Mount Vernon business loop ===
Business State Highway 37-E is a business loop that runs through Mount Vernon. The route was created on February 27, 1997 when SH 37 was routed west of town.

== See also ==
- List of state highways in Texas
- List of highways numbered 37
