= Franklin County Courthouse and Jail =

- U.S. National Register of Historic Places
- Texas State Antiquities Landmark
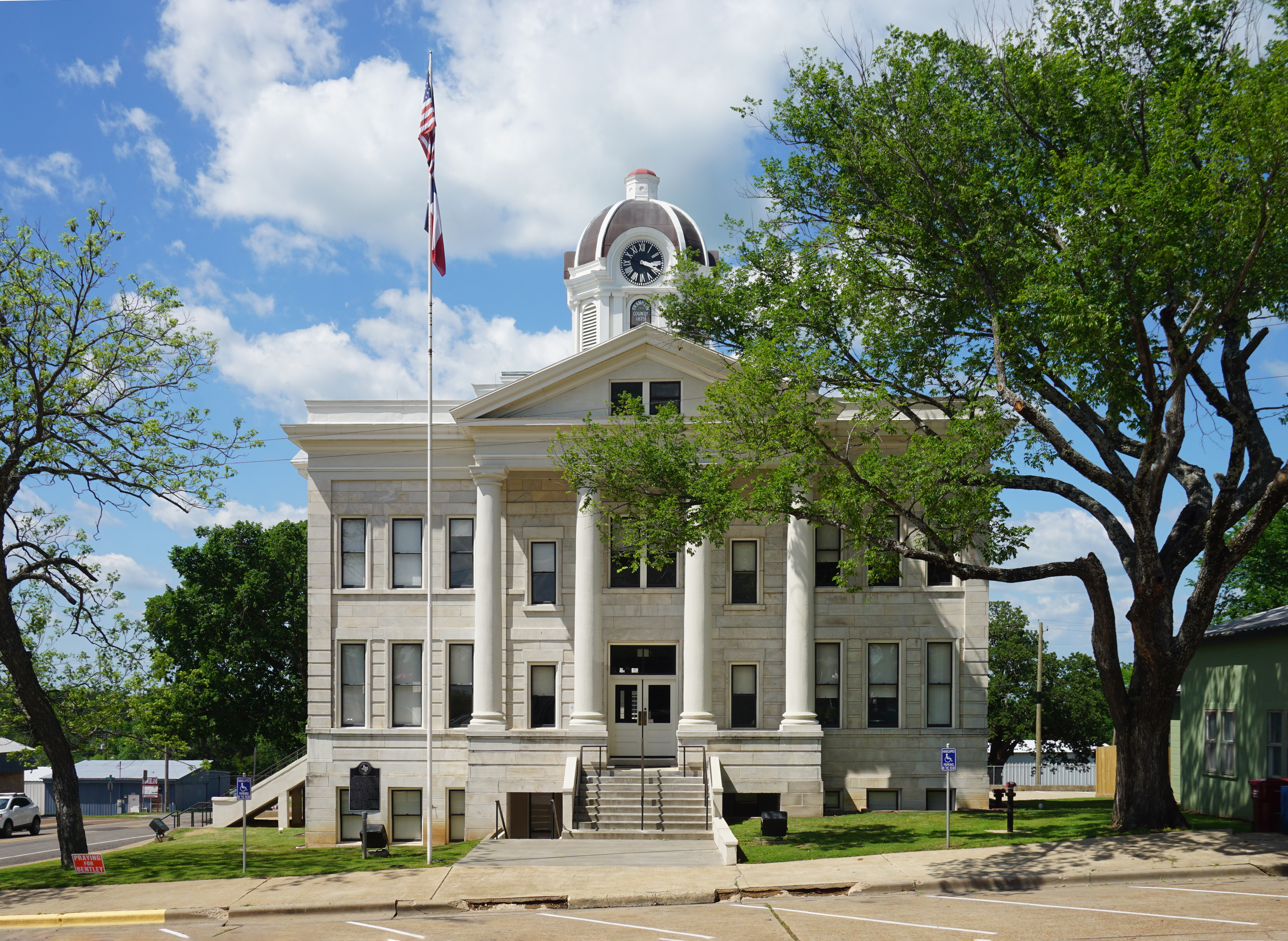
- Franklin County Courthouse in 2018

- Location within Texas Location within the United States
- Interactive map showing the location of Franklin County Courthouse and Jail
- Location: 200 N. Kaufman St., Mount Vernon, Texas
- Coordinates: 33°11′21″N 95°13′18″W
- Area: less than one acre
- Built: 1912
- Built by: L.R. Wright & Co.
- Architect: L.L. Thurman
- Architectural style: Classical Revival
- NRHP reference No.: 05001542
- TSAL No.: 8200003167

Significant dates
- Added to NRHP: January 18, 2006
- Designated TSAL: January 1, 2010

The Franklin County Courthouse and Jail in Mount Vernon, Texas was built in 1912. It was listed on the National Register of Historic Places in 2006. The listing includes two contributing buildings: the courthouse and the jail.

The design of a prior Franklin County courthouse, while not necessarily itself especially architecturally distinguished, was copied in the design of the Old Morris County Courthouse. The prior courthouse was built in 1875.

Its successor, the present courthouse, built in 1912, was designed by L.L. Thurman in Classical Revival style. The courthouse is a three-story sandstone building with full height columned and pedimented porticoes on two sides. It has an octagonal, domed clock tower.

The jail, also built in 1912, is a square two-story small building.

Thurman also designed the Jeff Davis County Courthouse and the Kinney County Courthouse which are also listed on the National Register.

== See also ==
- National Register of Historic Places listings in Franklin County, Texas
- List of county courthouses in Texas
