= The Sons of Katie Elder =

1965 film by Henry Hathaway

- 1965 movie poster
- Directed by: Henry Hathaway
- Written by: William H. Wright; Allan Weiss; Harry Essex
- Based on: Story by Talbot Jennings
- Produced by: Paul Nathan; Hal B. Wallis
- Starring: John Wayne; Dean Martin; Martha Hyer; Michael Anderson Jr. Earl Holliman; Jeremy Slate
- Cinematography: Lucien Ballard
- Edited by: Warren Low
- Music by: Elmer Bernstein
- Color process: Technicolor
- Production company: Wallis-Hazen
- Distributed by: Paramount Pictures
- Release date: June 24, 1965
- Running time: 122 minutes
- Country: United States
- Language: English
- Budget: $6.5 million
- Box office: $23 million

The Sons of Katie Elder is a 1965 American Western film in Panavision, directed by Henry Hathaway and starring John Wayne and Dean Martin. It was filmed principally in Mexico.

== Plot ==
The four adult sons of Katie Elder – John, who is a famous professional gunman; Tom, a professional gambler; Bud, the youngest brother, in his first year at mining college; and Matt, an unsuccessful hardware dealer – reunite in their hometown of Clearwater, Texas, in 1898 for their mother's funeral, sharing regret that none of them has lived up to her high expectations of them.

The townspeople and new deputy sheriff are unwelcoming, to John and Tom in particular, but Katie Elder was loved by everyone in the community, who were all aware of her honesty, her poverty, her generosity and her undying love for the sons who neglected her. The brothers want to do something for Katie's sake, and after an argument about marble monuments ends in a brawl, they decide to send Bud back to college. However, Bud wants to emulate his eldest brother.

Morgan Hastings, a gunsmith and rising entrepreneur, claims ownership of the Elders' rich ranch and access to water for his Hastings Gun Manufactory, saying he won it from their father Bass Elder in a game of cards. Bass was shot in the back that same night; the killer is still unknown. The Elders suspect foul play, and anticipating trouble, Hastings has brought in a hired gun, Curley. At first Hastings hides his hostile attitude towards the brothers, claiming that he offered to compensate their mother for the loss, but she refused.

A rancher named Striker agrees to let the brothers drive a herd of horses from his ranch in Pecos to sell to the miners in Colorado, on credit, a deal he started with their mother. When the wise, much-loved sheriff, Billy Wilson, asks Hastings some pointed questions, Hastings shoots him, framing the Elders. A posse intercepts them on their way back from Pecos with the herd. Billy dies before he can name his assassin, and a mob assembles to lynch the Elders. The judge insists that the Elders be driven to Laredo for safety.

During the transport, Hastings arranges an ambush using the deputized townsmen in the escort, except for Deputy Sheriff Ben Latta, who despite his hostility towards the Elders, remains dedicated to his duty. Curley plants dynamite under the bridge, and in the explosion, Matt is fatally impaled by a splinter; John kills Curley, Bud is seriously injured, and Hastings kills Ben when he tries to aid the Elders. John and Tom succeed in beating back the surviving ambushers; they return to town to get medical help for Bud and barricade themselves in the smithy. John tells the judge, now acting sheriff, that they can prove they were miles away when Billy was killed. The judge allows the doctor to tend to Bud and sends to Laredo for a marshal.

That night, Tom sneaks out to kidnap Hasting's weak-willed son Dave, but Hastings wounds Tom in the back. Hastings follows and shoots his own son to keep him from telling John the truth. In John and the judge's presence, Dave confesses his father's crimes before he dies. Now vindicated, John takes up arms in righteous fury and pursues Hastings to his gunsmith shop. After a gun battle, John shoots a cask of gunpowder inside the shop, blowing up the building with Hastings inside.

The film ends with Katie Elder's rocking chair rocking back and forth after a brush from John, symbolising that her sons did do good.

== Cast ==
- John Wayne as John Elder
- Dean Martin as Tom Elder
- Martha Hyer as Mary Gordon
- Michael Anderson Jr. as Bud Elder
- Earl Holliman as Matt Elder
- Jeremy Slate as Deputy Sheriff Ben Latta
- James Gregory as Morgan Hastings
- Paul Fix as Sheriff Billy Wilson
- George Kennedy as hired gunfighter Curley
- Dennis Hopper as Dave Hastings
- Sheldon Allman as Harry Evers
- John Litel as the Minister
- John Doucette as Hyselman
- James Westerfield as horse trader Mr. Vennar
- Rhys Williams as Charlie Striker
- John Qualen as Charlie Biller
- Rodolfo Acosta as Bondie Adams
- Strother Martin as Jeb Ross
- Percy Helton as Mr. Peevey
- Karl Swenson as Doc Isdell

== Production ==
=== Screenplay ===
William H. Wright picked up a copy of The Fighting Marlows, Men Who Wouldn't Be Lynched by Glenn Shirley in a Los Angeles bookstore in 1953. Thinking that it would make the basis of a good Western, he paid members of the Marlow family $1,000 (about $12033.58 when adjusted for inflation several decades later) each for the rights to make it into a screenplay, but when the movie was made 12 years later, the film's plot had been drastically changed. Talbot Jennings was credited for the script.

=== Development ===
Paramount purchased the story by William Wright and Talbot Jennings in 1955. The story concerned five brothers and revolved around a cattle drive from Texas to Colorado. Sam Briskin was assigned as producer. Frank Burt was to write the script, John Sturges was going to direct and Alan Ladd was to star, making a return to Paramount after several years' absence – he still owed Paramount one film.

Noel Langley signed to write a version of the script, and filming was to start in April 1956. In July 1956, though, Ladd had bought himself out of his Paramount commitment by paying $135,000, and would no longer make the film. (Henry Hathaway put this figure at $250,000.)

Film rights were picked up by Hal Wallis, who had a deal with Paramount. In 1959, Dean Martin was announced as starring in it. Eventually in 1964, John Wayne was signed to star, with Henry Hathaway to direct.

=== Shooting ===
Filming was due to begin in September 1964, but had to be delayed until January 1965, after Wayne was diagnosed with lung cancer. Following Wayne's surgery to remove a cancerous lung and two ribs, the star insisted on doing some of his own stunts, and nearly contracted pneumonia after being dragged into a river.

Outdoor locations were filmed in Durango, in northern Mexico, and the opening credits scene as a locomotive travels a narrow stream canyon valley on the famed Denver and Rio Grande Western Railroad (now, a scenic tourist train) Colorado, United States. The train depot scene that follows that (where the brothers wait for no-show John Wayne) was filmed at Perkinsville, Arizona, and that same train depot was used as Gold City near the end of How the West was Won. That train depot still stands at the end of the ride for Verde Canyon Railroad, a tourist train originating in Clarkdale, Arizona, before the train reverses and heads back.

Former Disney star Tommy Kirk was signed for the film, presumably in the role of Bud Elder, but his arrest for being at a party where marijuana was used led to his being fired from the production.

The name "Kate Elder" was one of several names used by Mary Katherine Horony Cummings, better known as "Big Nose Kate", a western icon and sometime companion of dentist/gambler/gunfighter Doc Holliday. As Holliday's Kate Elder lived until 1940, she cannot be the Katie Elder mentioned in this film.

John Wayne and Dean Martin had also starred in Howard Hawks's Rio Bravo six years earlier, one of Martin's earliest dramatic roles after splitting with his longtime comedic partner Jerry Lewis.

Four years later, Henry Hathaway also directed John Wayne in his only Academy Award-winning role of Indian Territory U.S. Marshal Rooster Cogburn in the original screen version of True Grit (1969). In addition to Wayne, actors Strother Martin, Dennis Hopper, and Jeremy Slate were all cast in that film.

== Music ==
The score was composed by Elmer Bernstein, who would also score True Grit by the same director and starring John Wayne. Johnny Cash sang a song in 1965 also called "The Sons of Katie Elder", written by Elmer Bernstein and Ernie Sheldon. Despite the title and composer, the song did not feature in this movie, but appeared on its soundtrack LP.

== Reception ==
Howard Thompson reviewed the film in The New York Times on August 26, 1965, calling it "a good, tough, unpretentious and gory little Western with a professional stamp and a laconic bite", helmed by "an ace director... who knows exactly how to spike menace and mayhem with authentic settings and excellent color. There is a workable, straight-moving plot... And there's one big question overhanging throughout. How could a town of reasonable citizens have knuckled under so readily to an obvious villain like James Gregory? Perhaps because he's a good actor. So is Mr. Wayne, in a part that fits him with bullet precision. The other three "brothers" lend able, lithe assistance... and the script's caustic dialogue also holds a wonderfully funny argument (by the brother)s about tombstones. Not a rare film—but lean, gory and well served."

Variety's review summarized the plot and observed: "Wayne delivers one of his customary rugged portrayals, a little old, perhaps, to have such a young brother as Anderson but not so old that he lacks the attributes of a gunman. Martin, who plays his part with a little more humor than the others, is equally effective in a hardboiled characterization."

In the September 15, 1965 edition of Vogue, Joan Didion, who was on-set during part of the shooting, praised the film succinctly: "This is an old-fashioned action Western. Very old-fashioned... In fact, I have a good time at movies like Katie Elder. I like the country and I like John Wayne and I like Dean Martin and I like gunfights. If you don’t, don’t bother." The previous month, Didion had published a profile of John Wayne in The Saturday Evening Post based on her experience on the set of the film. The article, titled "John Wayne: A Love Song", was later included in her 1968 essay collection Slouching Towards Bethlehem.

On Rotten Tomatoes, the film has a 100 percent rating based on reviews from 12 critics.

== Historical basis ==
The film was roughly based on the 1888 true story of the five Marlow Brothers (George H., Boone, Alfred, Lewellyn, and Charles) of Graham, Texas, in Young County, and Marlow, Oklahoma (then Indian Territory).

The city of Marlow, Oklahoma, is named after the Marlow family, including their parents, Dr. Wilburn Williamson Marlow Sr. and Martha Jane (née Keaton) Marlow. Dr. Marlow was the town's first physician and a prominent citizen. Marlow had previously been a Chisholm Trail rest spot near Wild Horse Creek. There the Marlows built a dugout home called "Marlow Camp" in 1880. Ten years later, the Chicago, Rock Island and Pacific Railroad came through and built a station on the location, naming it Marlow.

Dr. Wilburn and Martha Marlow had four children in addition to the five brothers: Wilburn Williamson "Willie" Marlow Jr. (died in Leadville, Colorado, in 1879, where he had been taken to convalesce after contracting malaria in Mexico), Charlotte Murphy, Elizabeth "Eliza" Gilmore, and Nancy Jane "Nannie" Murphy. Dr. Marlow died April 12, 1885.

Three of the brothers (Boone, Alfred, and Lewellyn) ended up being killed, although in the film, the brother that had done the real killings (basis for the Dean Martin role) was not with the other four when they were first arrested.

Boone had earlier killed James Holstein (or Holdson or Holston) in 1882, a man allegedly hired to "intimidate settlers", after an inebriated Holdson began shooting at him on the Gilmore farm near Vernon, Texas, just across the Red River from the Indian Territory (his sister Elizabeth had married into the Gilmore family and the couple had set up a place there). This killing seemed to be justified in self-defense, but would be brought up later by John and William Murphy, deputy marshal Edward W. "Ed" Johnson, and Sam Criswell, who were having a personal feud with Boone, and would be witnesses against the brothers.

Boone, Alfred (aka Alf), Lewellyn (aka Epp, Ep, Ellie), and Charles were arrested near the Anadarko Agency headquarters (what became Anadarko, Oklahoma), for stealing 19 horses in the area around Fort Sill. George went to the homestead in Marlow and took the women by wagon to Graham where he was then also arrested. Martha Jane bailed them out and they went to their place in Young County, a log and clapboard building on the farm of O. G. Denson, fifteen miles southeast of Graham.

Popular sheriff Marion DeKalb Wallace and his deputy Thomas B. "Tom" Collier went out to the Denson farm, December 17, 1888. Before they left Graham they had been drinking and were intoxicated. The Marlows (Charles and his wife, Alfred's wife, Martha, Lewellyn, and Boone Marlow) were sitting down to noon dinner. Boone saw Collier through the window and invited him in for dinner, to which Collier replied, "I'm not hungry." An altercation broke out between Collier and Boone, and without showing their warrant, Collier fired at Boone. As Wallace heard the commotion he came around from the other side of the house and came up behind Collier. Boone, aiming at Collier, shot sheriff Wallace by mistake. As Collier and Charles attended to Wallace, Boone left the area. The other four brothers went into town and turned themselves in.

A mob then tried to avenge the sheriff and attacked the jail, January 17, 1889, but the brothers were able to fight off the mob.

On January 19, 1889 (after dark), the deputy then decided to move the four brothers to Weatherford, Texas, chained together along with two other prisoners (William D. Burkhart and Louis Clift). But the two wagons and one buggy were ambushed along the way at Dry Creek (about two miles from Graham). The deputies guarding the brothers ran away, in league with the ambush party.

The brothers managed to get some weapons, get to cover, and hold off the attack, but Alfred and Lewellyn were killed. Also killed were three of the mob that attacked the Marlows: Frank Harmison, Sam Criswell, and Bruce Wheeler. George and Charles were both wounded (Charles severely so) but escaped, using Burkhart as a hostage and being aided by Clift, and went to their mother's house on the Denson farm. (About halfway there, they stopped in Finis at a farm house and asked to stay the night, but were refused. George spotted an ax and borrowed it to separate the men from their shackles. As soon Burkhart was free, he ran off). Also wounded were Johnson, Logan, and Clinton "Clint" Rutherford. The Marlows stayed at their mother's home until lawmen came from outside Young County, and then gave themselves up. Deputy U.S. Marshal W. F. Morton of Dallas finally arrived, took them into custody, and transported them, first toward Weatherford and then, fearing another ambush, to Dallas.

"This is the first time in the annals of history where unarmed prisoners, shackled together, ever repelled a mob. Such cool courage that preferred to fight against such great odds and die in glorious battle." Judge Andrew Phelps McCormick, 1891.

Boone had gone to stay with his girlfriend and her family, the Harbolts, in the vicinity of Marlow, but the girlfriend's brother, William "G.E." Harbolt, put some poison in the food that his sister took to Boone. William Harbolt had obtained the poison from a Dr. Carter. Harbolt, along with bounty hunters Jim "Martin" Beavers and John E. Derrickson (aka Direkson), shot his dead body for the $1,700 reward offered for his capture ($200 by the State of Texas and $1,500 by Young County), dead or alive. An autopsy by Doctor R. N. Price determined that he was already dead when he had been shot, and that he had died of arsenic poisoning. The three men were arrested but released on bail. Harbolt was later shot in the Chickasaw Nation of the Indian Territory and Beavers and Derrickson each received 15-year sentences.

The five Marlow brothers had been falsely accused of stealing horses, and after the shootout that left three dead, George and Charles were finally acquitted in a Dallas trial. The two brothers then moved to Colorado and became deputies.

As deputy marshal Ed Johnson was lying wounded at his home, he gave a newspaper interview to the Graham Leader. In the interview, he said that deputy sheriff Eugene Logan had been one of the guards taking the prisoners to Weatherford, and had been wounded in doing so. In fact, Logan had not been one of the guards but one of the men in the ambush party. The insistence that something be done in the edition of January 24 of the Graham Leader, and this slip up by Johnson, started an investigation into the affair by the U.S. marshal for the Northern District of Texas in Dallas, William Lewis Cabell. In addition, the U.S. attorney sent an investigator to Young County.

Collier, deputy Johnson, David "Dink" Allen, attorney Robert "Bob" Holman, Jack Wilkins, W. R. Benedict, county attorney Phlete A. Martin, deputy tax collector John Levell, constable Marion A. Wallace (the dead sheriff's nephew), Wil Hollis, William Bee Williams, Richard "Dick" Cook, deputy sheriff Eugene Logan, constable Sam Waggoner, Clint Rutherford, and Verna Wilkerson were all charged with conspiring to falsify a case against the Marlow brothers, conspiring to kill the Marlow brothers in an ambush, and murdering Alfred and Lewellyn Marlow while they were in the protective custody of a United States Marshal. However, only Cook, Hollis, Levell, Logan, Rutherford, Waggoner, Wallace, Wilkerson, and Williams, went to trial.

John William "Bee" Williams and Thomas B. Collier (typhoid fever) died while in jail in mid-January 1891.

George and Charles were summoned to testify and asked for and received protective custody from U.S. Marshal George A. Knight of Dallas. Additionally, Knight made George a "Special Deputy", while Charles was made an "attached witness". Phlete A. Martin and John Frank Spears (Spears was in jail with the Marlows at the time of the mob attack) both turned state's evidence and testified against the conspirators.

Clinton Rutherford was found not guilty on November 22, 1890, and the court removed Rutherford from the indictment, but bound over Eugene Logan and Verna Wilkerson. Logan, Waggoner, and Wallace were found guilty of conspiracy and not guilty of murder on April 17, 1891, and each sentenced to a $5,000 fine and ten years imprisonment. The other defendants (Cook, Levell, Hollis, and Wilkerson) were found not guilty.

The case involving Eugene Logan, William Williams, Verna Wilkerson, and Clinton Rutherford (United States v. Eugene Logan et al.) was separated from the other defendants, and went all the way to the United States Supreme Court. (See Logan v. United States, 144 U.S. 263 (1892), filed March 16, 1891.)

"A citizen of the United States, in the custody of a United States Marshall under a lawful commitment to answer for an offense against the United States, has the right to be protected by the United States against lawless violence; this right is a right secured to him by the Constitution and laws of the United States, and a conspiracy to injure or oppress him in its free exercise or enjoyment is punishable under section 5508 of the Revised Statutes."

The city of Graham had wanted to keep a federal court in their town, but after this incident the federal government denied that request.

== Legacy ==
The 2005 film Four Brothers was loosely based on The Sons of Katie Elder, which was also distributed by Paramount Pictures. The Malayalam film Big B (2007) was an unofficial remake (copy) of Four Brothers.
