= Rivercrest Independent School District =

School district in Texas

Location
- Bogata, TX ESC Region 8 USA

District information
- Type: Public
- Grades: Pre-K through 12
- Superintendent: Tiffany Mabe

Students and staff
- Athletic conference: UIL Class AA
- District mascot: rebel
- Colors: Royal Blue and White

Other information
- Website: www.rivercrestisd.net

Rivercrest Independent School District is a public school district based in Bogata, Texas (USA). Created in 1965, it was the Talco-Bogata Consolidated Independent School District until July 1999.

The district covers southwestern Red River County, northwestern Titus County (including the city of Talco), and a portion of northeastern Franklin County.

In 2009, the school district was rated "recognized" by the Texas Education Agency.

== Schools ==
- Rivercrest High School (Grades 9-12)
  - State champions in basketball, 2006
- Rivercrest Junior High (Grades 6-8)
- Rivercrest Elementary (Grades PK-5)

All three schools, along with the administration building and athletic facilities, are located at one campus on U.S. Highway 271 near the community of Johntown, Texas.

It previously maintained Bogata Elementary and Talco Elementary. The previous Talco school opened in 1939. The district began construction of the consolidated elementary on May 1, 2000 and the scheduled completion was in June 2001.
