= Mount Vernon High School (Texas) =

Location
- 501 Highway 37 South; Mount Vernon, Texas 75457; United States; 33.175705°N 95.228465°W

Information
- Type: Public high school
- School district: Mount Vernon Independent School District
- NCES School ID: 483177003541
- Principal: Jason Glover
- Teaching staff: 35.78 (on an FTE basis)
- Grades: 9–12
- Enrollment: 484 (2023–2024)
- Student to teacher ratio: 13.53
- Colors: Purple and White
- Athletics conference: University Interscholastic League Class 3A
- Mascot: Tiger/Lady Tiger
- Nickname: Tigers
- Yearbook: The Tiger's Tail
- Website: www.mtvernonisd.net/115723_2

Mount Vernon High School is a public high school in Mount Vernon, Texas, United States. It is part of the Mount Vernon Independent School District and classified as a 3A school by the University Interscholastic League. In 2015, the school was rated "Met Standard" by the Texas Education Agency.

== Athletics ==
The Mount Vernon Tigers compete in these sports:

- Baseball
- Basketball
- Cheerleading
- Cross Country
- Football
- Golf
- Powerlifting
- Softball
- Tennis
- Track and Field
- Volleyball
- Marching Band
- Color guard (flag spinning)
- Winter guard

The 1948 Boys Basketball championship team was coached by Milburn "Catfish" Smith who won the title undefeated. In 2019, the school hired Art Briles, who had been previously fired from Baylor for his prominent role in their sexual assault scandal, as their head football coach.

=== State titles ===
- Boys Basketball
  - 1948(1A)
- Girls Basketball
  - 2018 (3A) state champions
- Softball
  - 1994(3A)
- One Act Play
  - 2000(3A), 2004(3A), 2014(2A), 2023(3A), 2026(3A)
- Spirit (Cheerleading)
  - 2016 3A State Champions (UIL Pilot Year)
  - 2017 3A state champions
  - 2018 3A state champions
  - 2023 3A state champions

== Notable alumni ==
- Judd Hambrick, television newscaster and reporter
- Butch Maples, former professional football player
- Don Meredith, former professional football player

== Notable faculty ==
- Art Briles
