= Lake Bob Sandlin State Park =

State park in Northeast Texas

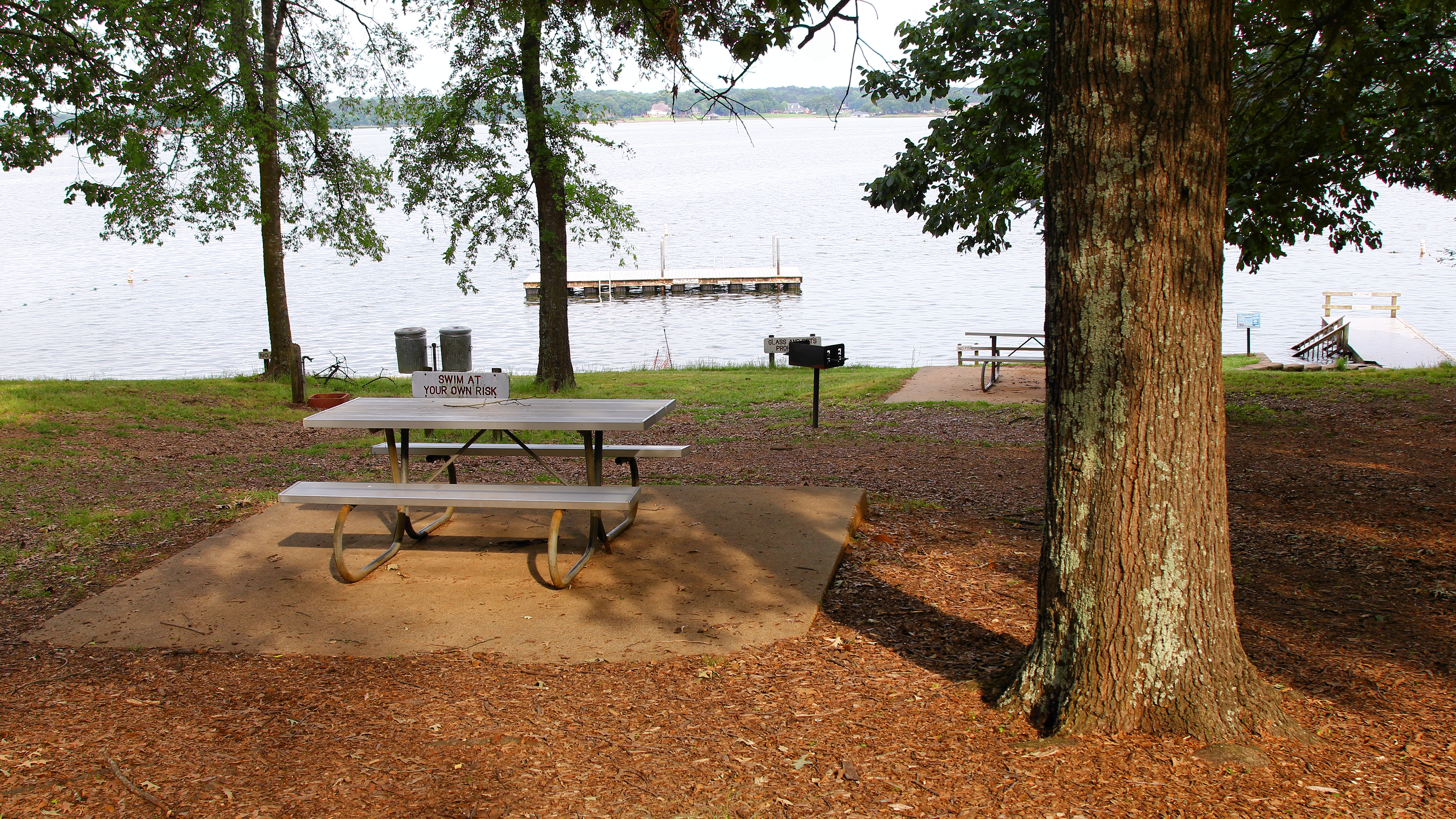
- The day use area at Lake Bob Sandlin State Park.

- Location within Texas Location within the United States
- Location: Titus County, Texas; Camp County, Texas; Franklin County, Texas; Wood County, Texas
- Nearest city: Pittsburg
- Coordinates: 33.053955°N 95.099155°W
- Area: 639.8 acres (258.9 ha)
- Established: 1987
- Visitors: 73,375 (in 2025)
- Governing body: Texas Parks and Wildlife Department
- Website: Official site

Lake Bob Sandlin State Park is a state park in Titus County, Texas, United States managed by the Texas Parks and Wildlife Department. The park covers 639.8 acres (258.9 ha) of land on the northern shore Lake Bob Sandlin about 10 miles southwest of Mount Pleasant.

== History ==
The land in the area was occupied by the Caddo people until the mid-1800s. Fort Sherman, a Republic of Texas stockade, was established by 1838, and eventually the land was used for farming and ranching by settlers, until it was acquired by Texas Parks and Wildlife Department in 1978.

Lake Bob Sandlin is located on Big Cypress Creek. It was impounded in 1977 with the construction of the Fort Sherman Dam. Lake Bob Sandlin is named after Bob Sandlin, a major proponent of the lake, who was a local businessman, civic leader, and president of Titus County Fresh Water Supply District No. 1. A formal dedication ceremony occurred on June 25, 1978.

== Facilities and activities ==
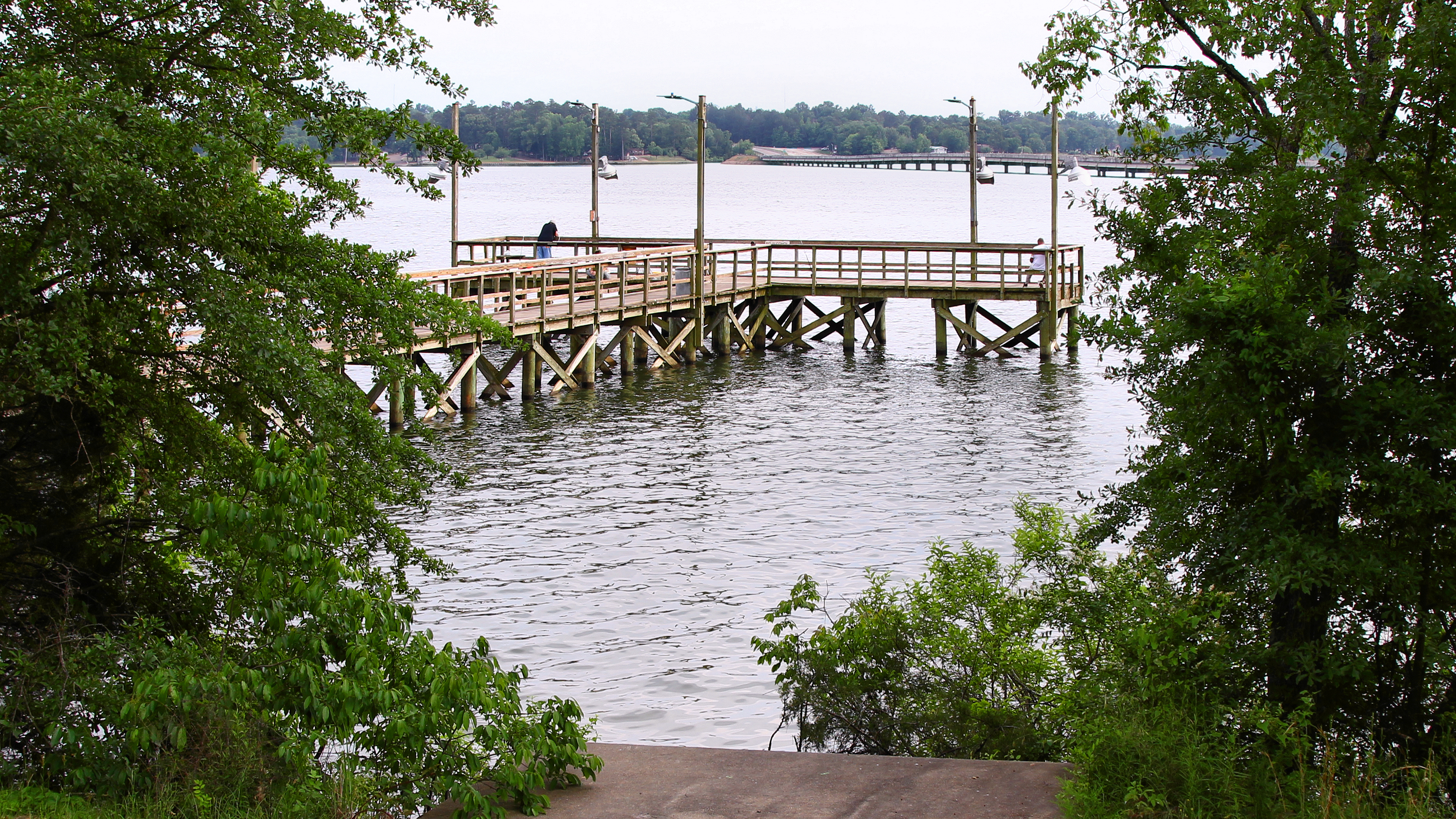
The fishing pier at Lake Bob Sandlin State Park.

The park offers over three miles of hiking and biking trails, a fishing pier and boat ramp, and opportunities for swimming, picnicking, geocaching, kayaking, and other outdoor activities. It also features campgrounds with recreational vehicle hookups, covered shelters, and primitive cabins and tent sites for overnight stays. The historic Fort Sherman Cemetery in located the park.

== Nature ==
=== Animals ===
The park is located at the intersection of the Piney Woods and Blackland Prairie ecoregions, and thus has a diverse variety of wildlife species including white-tailed deer, common raccoon, coyote, gray fox, fox squirrel, and bobcat. There are at least 188 bird species that have been sighted in the park such as the bald eagle and eastern bluebird, and the lake offers many species of fish, including Florida bass, and channel catfish. A trout pond in the park is stocked with rainbow trout.

=== Plants ===
Plants documented in the park include Hercules club, sassafras, winged elm, sweet gum, eastern red cedar, American elm, white oak, Shumard red oak, coral honeysuckle, devil's walking stick, hackberry, eastern redbud, wild grape, red buckeye, American beautyberry, loblolly pine, red maple, common persimmon, and poison ivy.

== See also ==
- Texas state parks
