= Bogata, Texas =

- City
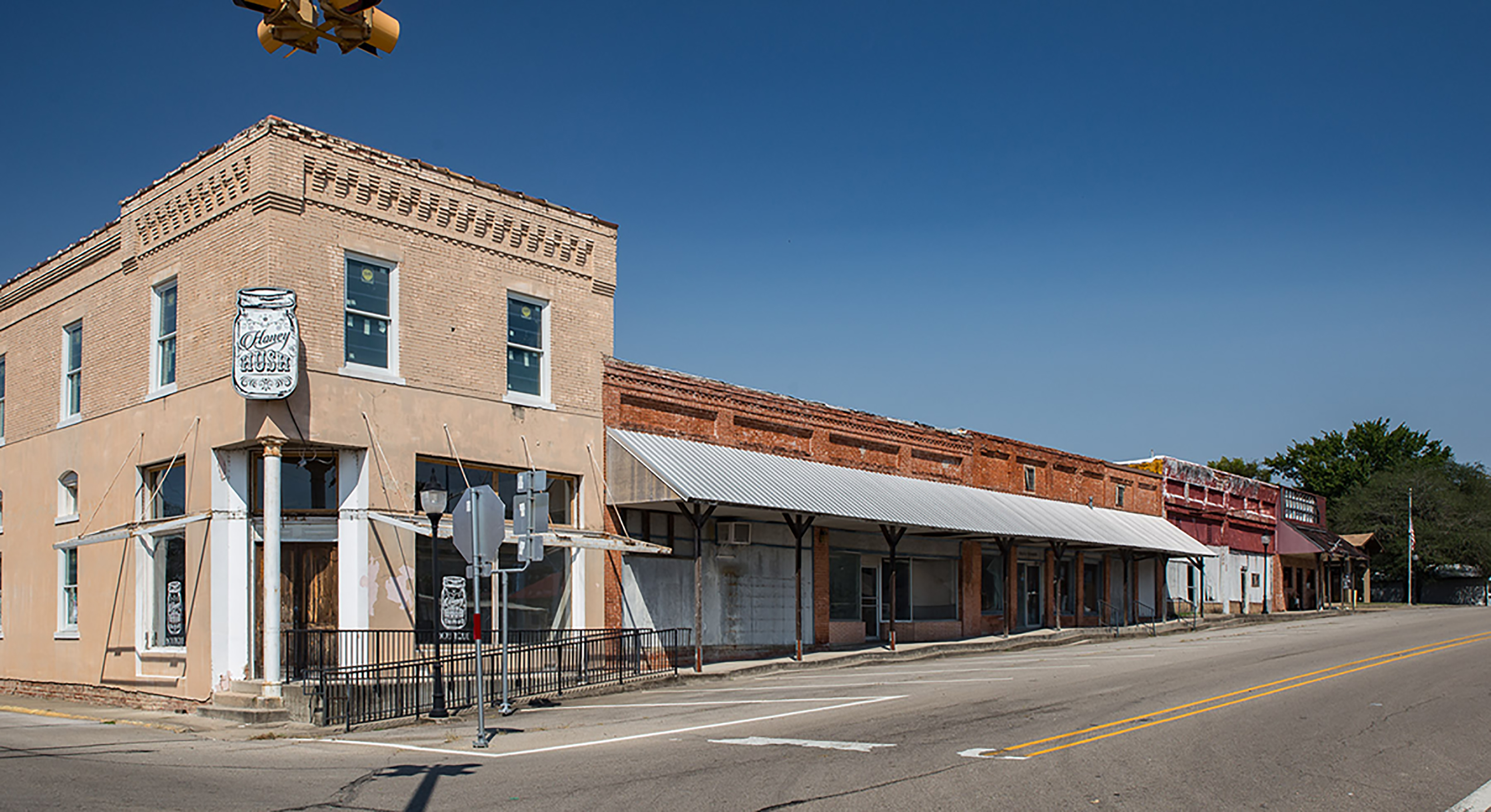
- Downtown Bogata
- Interactive map of Bogata, Texas
- Coordinates: 33°28′13″N 95°12′51″W
- Country: United States
- State: Texas
- County: Red River

Government
  - Mayor: Vincent Lum

Area
  - Total: 1.41 sq mi (3.66 km^{2})
  - Land: 1.41 sq mi (3.66 km^{2})
  - Water: 0 sq mi (0.00 km^{2})
- Elevation: 417 ft (127 m)

Population (2020)
  - Total: 1,074
  - Density: 760/sq mi (293/km^{2})
- Time zone: UTC-6 (Central (CST))
  - Summer (DST): UTC-5 (CDT)
- ZIP code: 75417
- Area codes: 903, 430
- FIPS code: 48-09172
- GNIS feature ID: 2409875
- Website: https://www.cityofbogata.com/

Bogata (/bəˈɡoʊtə/ bə-GOH-tə) is a city in Red River County, Texas, United States. The population was 1,074 at the 2020 census. The city was named after Bogotá, the capital of Colombia.

== Geography ==
According to the United States Census Bureau, the city has a total area of 1.4 square miles (3.6 km^{2}), all land.

== Demographics ==
Historical population
Census	Pop.	Note	%±
1940	800		—
1950	936		17.0%
1960	1,112		18.8%
1970	1,287		15.7%
1980	1,508		17.2%
1990	1,421		−5.8%
2000	1,396		−1.8%
2010	1,153		−17.4%
2020	1,074		−6.9%
U.S. Decennial Census

=== 2020 census ===
As of the 2020 census, there were 1,074 people, 480 households, and 285 families residing in the city. The median age was 40.3 years, 23.6% of residents were under the age of 18, and 20.9% were 65 years of age or older. For every 100 females there were 89.1 males, and for every 100 females age 18 and over there were 81.6 males age 18 and over.

0% of residents lived in urban areas, while 100.0% lived in rural areas.

There were 480 households in Bogata, of which 31.3% had children under the age of 18 living in them. Of all households, 38.1% were married-couple households, 19.2% were households with a male householder and no spouse or partner present, and 37.1% were households with a female householder and no spouse or partner present. About 34.6% of all households were made up of individuals and 17.9% had someone living alone who was 65 years of age or older.

There were 554 housing units, of which 13.4% were vacant. Among occupied housing units, 61.0% were owner-occupied and 39.0% were renter-occupied. The homeowner vacancy rate was 2.0% and the rental vacancy rate was 8.1%.

Racial composition as of the 2020 census
Race	Percent
White	87.5%
Black or African American	1.8%
American Indian and Alaska Native	2.1%
Asian	0.2%
Native Hawaiian and Other Pacific Islander	0%
Some other race	2.2%
Two or more races	6.1%
Hispanic or Latino (of any race)	6.4%

=== 2000 census ===
As of the 2000 census, 1,396 people, 598 households, and 361 families resided in the city. The population density was 989.9 inhabitants per square mile (382.2/km^{2}). There were 659 housing units at an average density of 467.3 per square mile (180.4/km^{2}).

The racial makeup of the city was 93.91% White American, 3.01% African American, 0.72% Native American, 1.36% from other races, and 1.00% from two or more races. Hispanics or Latinos of any race were 3.30% of the population.

Of the 598 households, 26.1% had children under the age of 18 living with them, 45.3% were married couples living together, 11.7% had a female householder with no husband present, and 39.5% were not families. About 37.1% of all households were made up of individuals, and 20.7% had someone living alone who was 65 years of age or older. The average household size was 2.22 and the average family size was 2.92.

In the city, the population was distributed as 22.1% under the age of 18, 6.8% from 18 to 24, 24.4% from 25 to 44, 20.8% from 45 to 64, and 25.8% who were 65 years of age or older. The median age was 43 years. For every 100 females, there were 84.7 males. For every 100 females age 18 and over, there were 82.7 males.

The median income for a household in the city was $22,969, and for a family was $28,828. Males had a median income of $21,786 versus $19,423 for females. The per capita income for the city was $14,126. About 16.9% of families and 19.8% of the population were below the poverty line, including 26.0% of those under age 18 and 23.4% of those age 65 or over.

== Education ==
The City of Bogata is served by the Rivercrest Independent School District (Talco-Bogata Consolidated Independent School District prior to July 1999).

It previously maintained Bogata Elementary. The district began construction of the consolidated elementary on May 1, 2000, and the scheduled completion was in June 2001.
