= Lake Cypress Springs =

Reservoir in northeast Texas

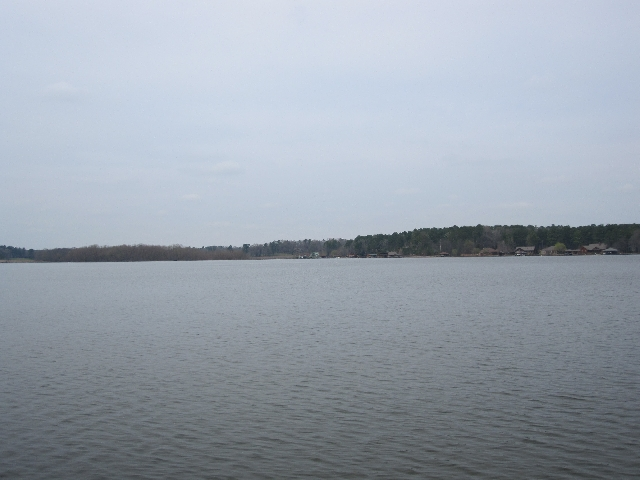
- Lake Cypress Springs looking north on the north branch.

- Location within Texas Location within the United States

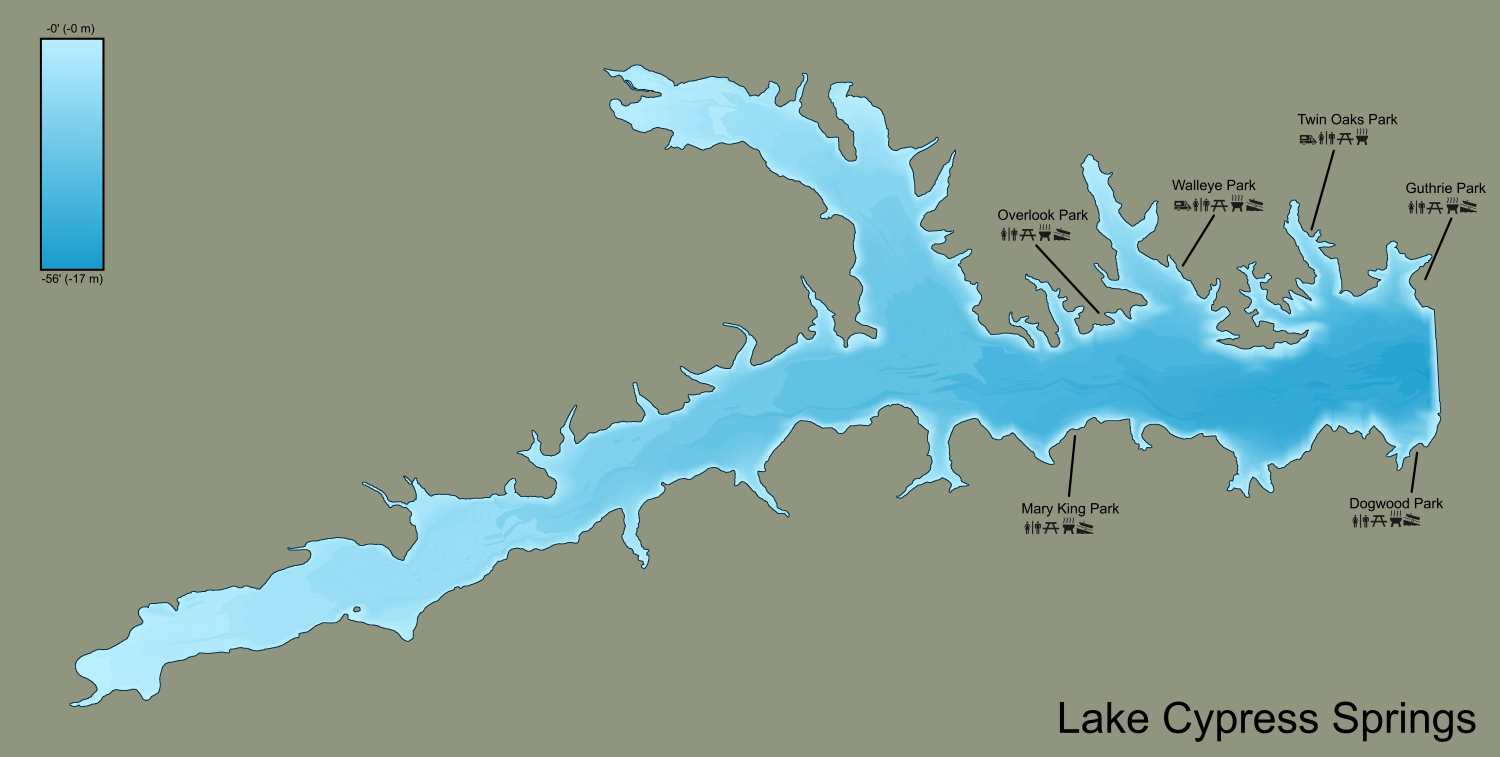
- Map showing the depth of different areas of the lake and the public parks on the lake.
- Location: Franklin county, Texas, US
- Coordinates: 33°03′38″N 95°10′58″W
- Type: Reservoir
- Primary inflows: Big Cypress Creek
- Primary outflows: Lake Bob Sandlin
- Basin countries: United States
- Managing agency: Franklin County Water District
- Construction engineer: Wisenbaker, Fix, and Associates
- First flooded: July 7, 1970
- Surface area: 3,461 acres (1,401 ha)
- Average depth: 19.29 ft (5.88 m)
- Max. depth: 56 ft (17 m)
- Water volume: 66,756 acre⋅ft (82,342,000 m^{3})
- Shore length^{1}: 47 mi (76 km)
- Surface elevation: 378 ft (115 m)
- Islands: 1
- ^{1} Shore length is not a well-defined measure.

Lake Cypress Springs is a 3,461-acre (1,401 ha) reservoir in northeast Texas, approximately 90 miles (140 km) east of Dallas, Texas. The lake is used for recreational, municipal, and industrial purposes. The lake is regularly monitored by a lake patrol, which enforces wake zones, fishing licenses, boat dock rules, and boating. Lake Cypress Springs has 20 subdivisions and around 850 waterfront homes. In 2011, Lake Cypress Springs was rated one of "The 10 Best Lakes to Call Home" according to D Magazine.

== History ==
Authorization was given on 10 November 1966 to construct the dam, originally designed to impound 72,800 acre⋅ft (89,800,000 m^{3}) of water. The dam was built by the Vibig Construction Company of Dallas, Texas, with construction starting on 1 July 1968. Construction was finished on the dam on 15 February 1971. The dam is 5,230 ft (1,590 m) long, with the top of the dam at 395 ft (120 m) above sea level. Water leaves the reservoir through a morning-glory-type spillway, at a height of 378 ft (115 m), with a 6-foot (1.8 m) fish screen, which is required by the Texas Parks and Wildlife Department. An emergency spillway exists at the north end of the dam to assist during major floods. The dam cost US$1,340,126 in 1969 (equivalent to $11,765,625 in 2025).

=== Lake ===
Originally, the lake was to be known as Big Cypress Creek Lake during dam construction, and later was known as Lake Franklin County until it was officially changed to Lake Cypress Springs on 2 April 1971. The lake has a watershed of 74 square miles (190 km^{2}). W. R. Boyd, Inc. was responsible for clearing the woody land beneath the lake today to help make Lake Cypress Springs a recreational lake at a cost of US$194,740 (equivalent to $1,709,718 in 2025). The original basin of the lake consisted almost entirely of covered vegetation along the Big Cypress Creek. This made clearing the basin an important task not only to make the lake a recreational one, but also allow the lake to be navigable via boat, due to the shallow nature of the lake. Various roads, such as FM 115 had to be rerouted to allow traffic to still flow through the county.

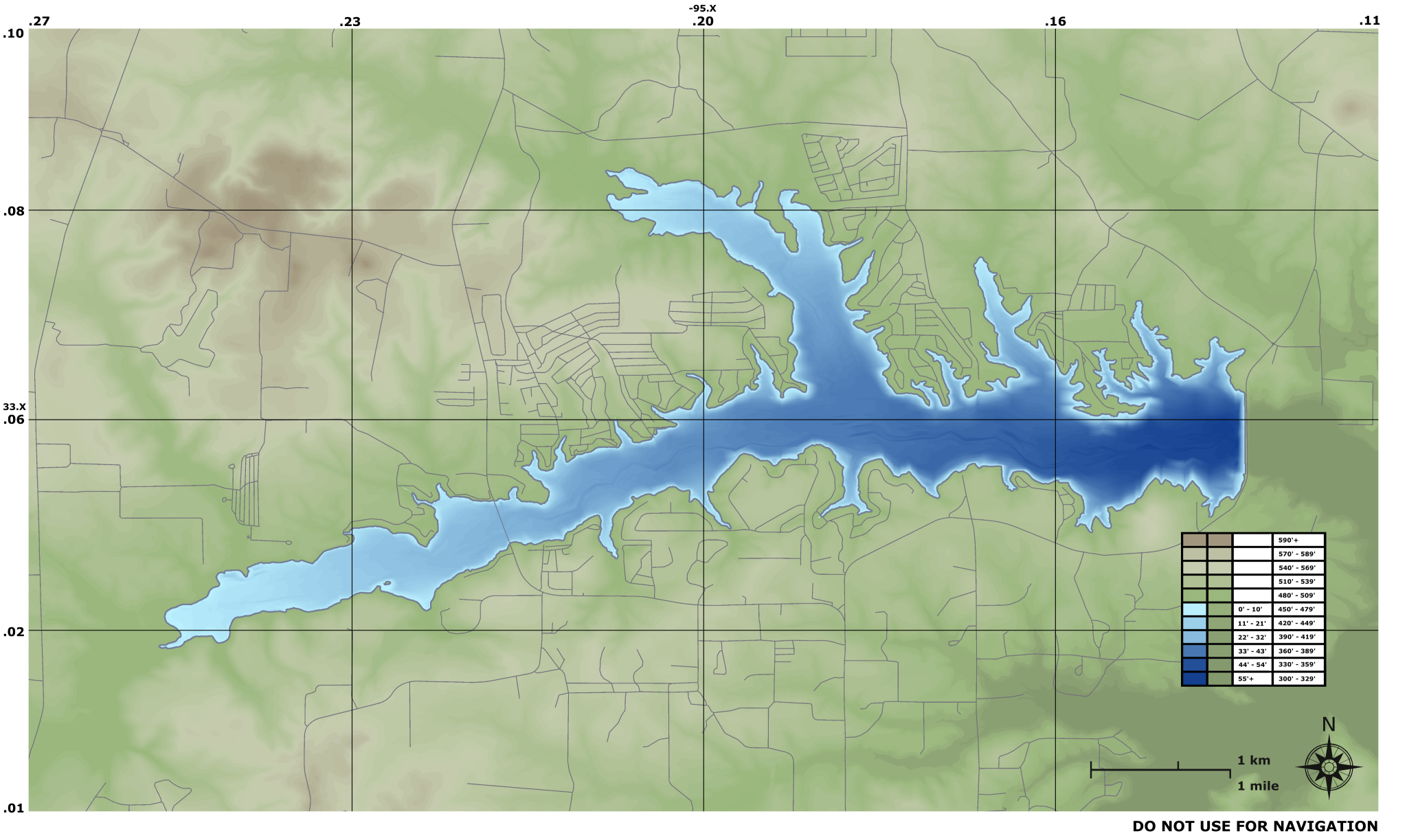
A topographical map of Lake Cypress Springs and the surrounding area.

In 2014, construction finished on Phase 3a of the Keystone Pipeline which passes within 3,000 ft (910 m) of the west end of the lake. On 27 December 2015, torrential rains caused the lake to rise to all-time highs. During this time, all watercraft were prohibited from operating on the lake. During the high water event, 786,000,000 US gal (2.98×10^{9} L; 654,000,000 imp gal) was moved through the lake in a day to alleviate the effects of the flooding. Yearly, there is a fireworks show around the 4th of July from Mary King Park. An estimated 20,000 people watched the show in 2009, with many viewing from their boats on the lake.

== Ecology ==
According to the most recent core samples taken in 2007 from Lake Cypress Springs, the lake has a primarily sand and clay bottom. The maximum sediment depth appears to be in the old submerged Big Cypress Creek, at a depth of 7.2 ft (2.2 m).

=== Parks ===
Lake Cypress Springs is home to six parks, Walleye Park, Twin Oaks Park, Guthrie Park, Overlook Park, Dogwood Park, and Mary King Park. Several locations allow for primitive camping and RV camping. The parks are maintained by the Franklin County Water District. Rates are $10 and $25 throughout the year for primitive camping and tent sites, respectively. RV sites cost between $25 - $50 depending on the season and park. There are an average of 18 parking spaces available at each park. The nearest state park is Lake Bob Sandlin State Park, approximately 4 miles (6.4 km) away.

=== Vegetation ===
Since 2006, Lake Cypress Springs is one of the few lakes in East Texas that does not have invasive hydrilla, thanks to Triploid Grass Carp stocked in 1997 and 2006, making it ideal for recreational activities, such as swimming. Hydrilla was first found in the lake in the 1970s. American lotus is present at the west end of the lake thanks to the shallow water. During the first addition of grass carp, the lake experienced an increase in Lyngbia wollei algae, which can only be controlled with a decrease in nutrients. The lake is primarily surrounded by a cover of loblolly pines, which grow well in East Texas. Starting in 2003, a management project is currently underway to revitalize the natural vegetation of the lake, which includes the protection of cypress trees.

=== Birds ===
There is a wide variety of birds that can be seen around the lake. Cattle egret, American avocet, American herring gull, Red-headed woodpecker, Osprey, Northern flicker, and Buff-bellied pipit, have all been spotted around or on the lake. There is a sizable population of Wood duck, Black-bellied whistling duck, Great egret, and Great blue heron. During the winter, much of the bird activity dies down, however American white pelicans and Bald eagles can be seen throughout the season.

=== Fish ===
The lake has been stocked numerous times to attract anglers to the lake and improve the vegetation in the reservoir. A Texas-issued fishing license is required to fish on the lake.

Harvest Regulations
Fish	Bag Limit	Minimum Length	Notes
Channel and Blue catfish	25	12 in (300 mm)	Any combination.
Flathead catfish	5	18 in (460 mm)	
White bass	25	10 in (250 mm)	
Largemouth bass	5	14 in (360 mm)	All largemouth and spotted bass count towards the same bag limit (5 total).
Spotted bass	5	NA	All largemouth and spotted bass count towards the same bag limit (5 total).
White crappie and Black crappie	25	10 in (250 mm)	Any combination.

Stocking History
Species	Year	Number	Size
Blue catfish	1982	6,154	Advanced Fingerling
Channel catfish	1993	4,991	Advanced Fingerling
Redear sunfish	1967	2,750	Unknown
Bluegill and Green sunfish	1997	500	Fingerling
Largemouth bass	2015	70,570	Fingerling
Black crappie	1966	2,750	Fingerling
Walleye	1972	53,460	Fry
Triploid grass carp	2006	3,000	Adult

== Notes ==
1.Up to date as of 2015.
