= Franklin County, Texas =

County in Texas, United States

- County
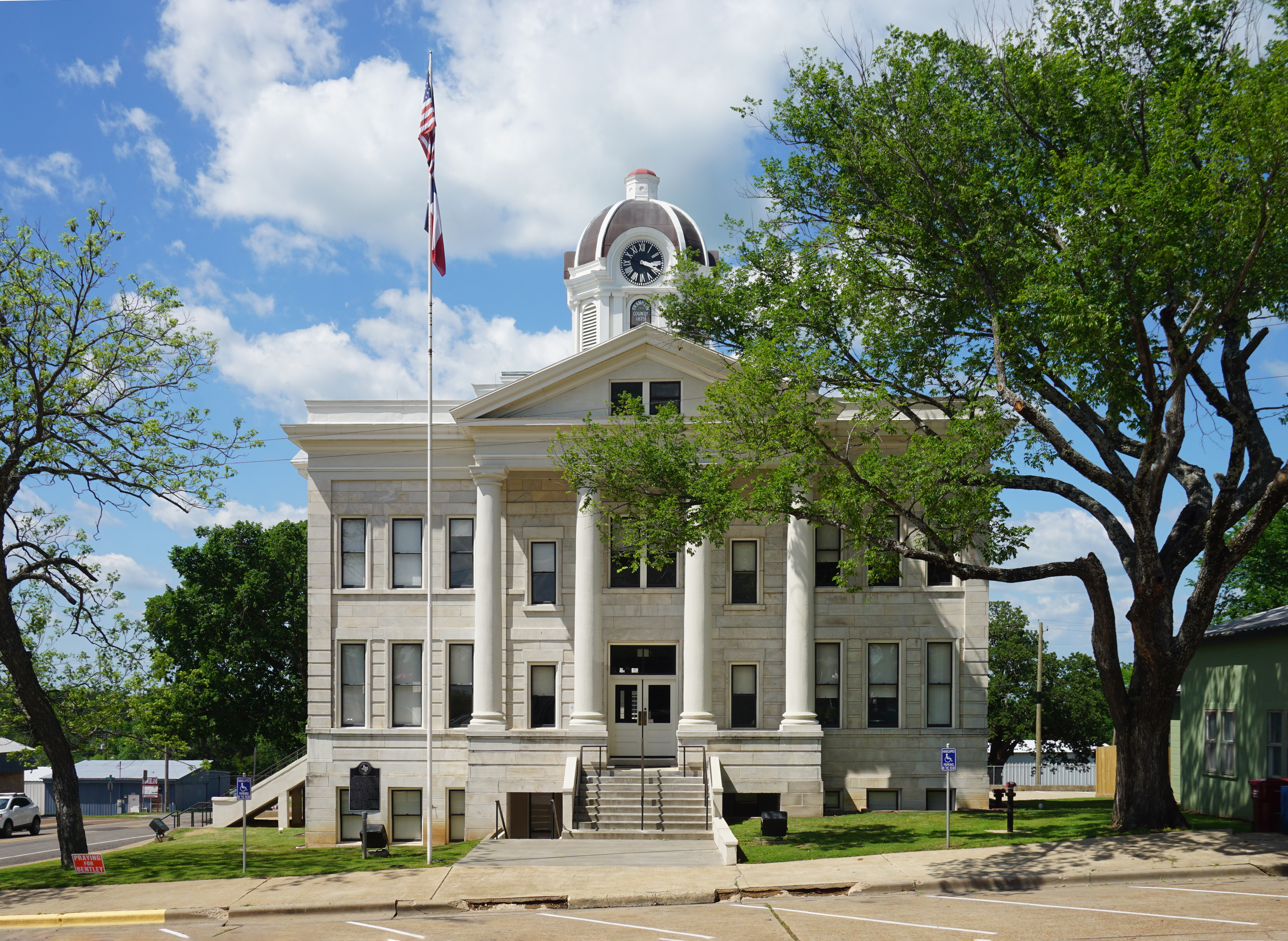
- The Franklin County Courthouse in Mount Vernon in 2018

- Location within the U.S. state of Texas
- Coordinates: 33°11′N 95°13′W
- Country: United States
- State: Texas
- Founded: March, 1875
- Seat: Mount Vernon
- Largest town: Mount Vernon

Area
  - Total: 295 sq mi (760 km^{2})
  - Land: 284 sq mi (740 km^{2})
  - Water: 10 sq mi (26 km^{2}) 3.5%

Population (2020)
  - Total: 10,359
  - Estimate (2025): 10,994 ▲
  - Density: 35/sq mi (14/km^{2})
- Time zone: UTC−6 (Central)
  - Summer (DST): UTC−5 (CDT)
- Congressional district: 1st
- Website: www.co.franklin.tx.us

Franklin County is a county located in the U.S. state of Texas. At the 2020 census, its population was 10,359. The county seat is Mount Vernon.

== History ==
Franklin County was erected and established in 1875, four decades after the independence of Texas, from land ceded by neighboring Titus County. Although the origin of the county's name is not recorded, it is generally believed to have been named after Judge Benjamin C. Franklin, the first appointed justice in the Republic of Texas.

There are two historic properties listed on the National Register of Historic Places in Franklin County.

Franklin County was one of the last 30 prohibition, or entirely dry, counties in the state of Texas. Citizens of its county seat, Mount Vernon, voted to allow beer and wine sales, both on and off premises, in May 2013.

== Geography ==
According to the U.S. Census Bureau, the county has a total area of 295 square miles (760 km^{2}), of which 284 square miles (740 km^{2}) is land and 10 square miles (26 km^{2}) (3.5%) is water.

=== Major highways ===
- Interstate 30
- U.S. Highway 67
- U.S. Highway 271
- State Highway 11
- State Highway 37
- Spur 423

=== Adjacent counties ===
- Red River County (north)
- Titus County (east)
- Camp County (southeast)
- Wood County (south)
- Hopkins County (west)
- Delta County (northwest)

== Communities ==
=== City ===
- Winnsboro (mostly in Wood County)

=== Town ===
- Mount Vernon (county seat)

=== Unincorporated communities ===
- Clearwater
- Cypress
- Daphne
- Eureka
- Hagansport
- Hopewell
- Lakeview
- Macon
- Majors
- New Hope
- Purley
- Scroggins

== Demographics ==
Historical population
Census	Pop.	Note	%±
1880	5,280		—
1890	6,481		22.7%
1900	8,674		33.8%
1910	9,331		7.6%
1920	9,304		−0.3%
1930	8,494		−8.7%
1940	8,378		−1.4%
1950	6,257		−25.3%
1960	5,101		−18.5%
1970	5,291		3.7%
1980	6,893		30.3%
1990	7,802		13.2%
2000	9,458		21.2%
2010	10,605		12.1%
2020	10,359		−2.3%
2025 (est.)	10,994	▲	6.1%
U.S. Decennial Census; 1850–2010 2010–2020

=== Racial and ethnic composition ===
Franklin County, Texas – Racial and ethnic composition Note: the US Census treats Hispanic/Latino as an ethnic category. This table excludes Latinos from the racial categories and assigns them to a separate category. Hispanics/Latinos may be of any race.
Race / Ethnicity (NH = Non-Hispanic)	Pop 1980	Pop 1990	Pop 2000	Pop 2010	Pop 2020	% 1980	% 1990	% 2000	% 2010	% 2020
White alone (NH)	6,374	7,040	8,129	8,601	7,876	92.47%	90.23%	85.95%	81.10%	76.03%
Black or African American alone (NH)	409	349	364	411	394	5.93%	4.47%	3.85%	3.88%	3.80%
Native American or Alaska Native alone (NH)	18	37	46	65	39	0.26%	0.47%	0.49%	0.61%	0.38%
Asian alone (NH)	10	18	18	49	68	0.15%	0.23%	0.19%	0.46%	0.66%
Native Hawaiian or Pacific Islander alone (NH)	x	x	0	0	6	x	x	0.00%	0.00%	0.06%
Other race alone (NH)	4	1	2	9	61	0.06%	0.01%	0.02%	0.08%	0.59%
Mixed race or Multiracial (NH)	x	x	57	137	460	x	x	0.60%	1.29%	4.44%
Hispanic or Latino (any race)	78	357	842	1,333	1,455	1.13%	4.58%	8.90%	12.57%	14.05%
Total	6,893	7,802	9,458	10,605	10,359	100.00%	100.00%	100.00%	100.00%	100.00%

=== 2020 census ===
As of the 2020 census, the county had a population of 10,359. The median age was 43.8 years, 22.6% of residents were under the age of 18, and 22.0% of residents were 65 years of age or older. For every 100 females there were 95.0 males, and for every 100 females age 18 and over there were 91.9 males age 18 and over.

The racial makeup of the county was 78.6% White, 3.9% Black or African American, 0.7% American Indian and Alaska Native, 0.7% Asian, 0.1% Native Hawaiian and Pacific Islander, 6.8% from some other race, and 9.3% from two or more races. Hispanic or Latino residents of any race comprised 14.0% of the population.

<0.1% of residents lived in urban areas, while 100.0% lived in rural areas.

There were 4,046 households in the county, of which 31.3% had children under the age of 18 living in them. Of all households, 53.9% were married-couple households, 15.9% were households with a male householder and no spouse or partner present, and 25.1% were households with a female householder and no spouse or partner present. About 24.5% of all households were made up of individuals and 12.8% had someone living alone who was 65 years of age or older.

There were 5,089 housing units, of which 20.5% were vacant. Among occupied housing units, 75.3% were owner-occupied and 24.7% were renter-occupied. The homeowner vacancy rate was 1.9% and the rental vacancy rate was 8.4%.

According to the United States Census Bureau's 2020 Annual Income Estimates, the median household income was $59,632; the mean income was $82,203.

=== 2000 census ===
At the 2000 U.S. census, there were 9,458 people, 3,754 households, and 2,732 families residing in the county. The population density was 33 people per square mile (13 people/km^{2}). There were 5,132 housing units at an average density of 18 units per square mile (6.9/km^{2}). The racial makeup of the county was 89.19% White, 3.94% Black or African American, 0.63% Native American, 0.21% Asian, 5.14% from other races, and 0.88% from two or more races. 8.90% of the population were Hispanic or Latino of any race.

== Economy ==
According to a study ordered by the Mount Vernon Economic Development Corporation in 2013, the local retail trade area population is 12,771 people. The county has 720 homes valued at $200,000 or more, 70 homes of $500,000 or more, and 72 homes valued at more than $1,000,000. Most of these homes are centered on Lake Cypress Springs, which was twice voted the Most Beautiful Lake in Texas by the readers of Dallas' "D" magazine (2005, 2010). The lake is located about 10 miles south of Mount Vernon. The EDC study determined the average sale price of lakefront property on Lake Cypress Springs (2012) was $484,000, with 91 percent of the 1,400 water-front homes being second residences. This concentration of second residences causes the population of the county to increase between 3,000 and 8,000 people on weekends and during holidays, according to estimates by the Franklin County Water District, which oversees the lake and its visitors.

== Education ==
The following school districts serve Franklin County:

- Mount Vernon ISD
- Rivercrest ISD (partly in Red River, Titus counties)
- Saltillo ISD (mostly in Hopkins County)
- Sulphur Bluff ISD (mostly in Hopkins County)
- Winnsboro ISD (mostly in Wood County, small portion in Hopkins County)

== Politics ==
Franklin County is represented in the Texas House of Representatives by the Republican Shelley Luther (Tx.HR Dist. 62). It is represented in the Texas Senate by Republican Bryan Hughes of Mineola, Texas (Tx. Sen. Dist. 1). Franklin County is part of the First Congressional District of Texas which has been represented by Republican U.S. Congressman Nathaniel Moran since January 2023.

United States presidential election results for Franklin County, Texas
Year	Republican		Democratic		Third party(ies)	
Year	No.	%	No.	%	No.	%
1912	19	3.15%	573	94.87%	12	1.99%
1916	62	7.87%	684	86.80%	42	5.33%
1924	118	8.83%	1,157	86.60%	61	4.57%
1928	386	35.12%	713	64.88%	0	0.00%
1932	56	4.11%	1,305	95.81%	1	0.07%
1936	90	8.85%	925	90.95%	2	0.20%
1940	183	10.13%	1,621	89.76%	2	0.11%
1944	147	9.18%	1,336	83.45%	118	7.37%
1948	146	9.56%	1,236	80.94%	145	9.50%
1952	564	29.33%	1,358	70.62%	1	0.05%
1956	556	33.88%	1,082	65.94%	3	0.18%
1960	620	34.95%	1,148	64.71%	6	0.34%
1964	424	21.81%	1,520	78.19%	0	0.00%
1968	481	24.18%	1,001	50.33%	507	25.49%
1972	1,059	65.90%	546	33.98%	2	0.12%
1976	758	31.53%	1,636	68.05%	10	0.42%
1980	1,105	41.97%	1,487	56.48%	41	1.56%
1984	1,836	62.28%	1,104	37.45%	8	0.27%
1988	1,439	49.69%	1,453	50.17%	4	0.14%
1992	1,058	31.66%	1,338	40.04%	946	28.31%
1996	1,575	45.63%	1,484	42.99%	393	11.38%
2000	2,420	69.70%	1,018	29.32%	34	0.98%
2004	3,185	75.53%	1,011	23.97%	21	0.50%
2008	3,392	75.53%	1,036	23.07%	63	1.40%
2012	3,446	80.95%	751	17.64%	60	1.41%
2016	3,585	81.85%	665	15.18%	130	2.97%
2020	4,161	83.07%	804	16.05%	44	0.88%
2024	4,473	84.22%	813	15.31%	25	0.47%

United States Senate election results for Franklin County, Texas1
Year	Republican		Democratic		Third party(ies)	
Year	No.	%	No.	%	No.	%
2024	4,349	82.43%	859	16.28%	68	1.29%

United States Senate election results for Franklin County, Texas2
Year	Republican		Democratic		Third party(ies)	
Year	No.	%	No.	%	No.	%
2020	4,114	83.25%	753	15.24%	75	1.52%

Texas Gubernatorial election results for Franklin County
Year	Republican		Democratic		Third party(ies)	
Year	No.	%	No.	%	No.	%
2022	3,369	86.01%	512	13.07%	36	0.92%

== See also ==
- Recorded Texas Historic Landmarks in Franklin County
