= Mount Vernon Independent School District =

School district in Texas

Address
- 501 Texas Highway 37 Mount Vernon, Texas, 75457; United States

District information
- Type: Public
- Grades: PreK–12
- NCES District ID: 4831770

Students and staff
- Students: 1,478
- Teachers: 121.42 (FTE)
- Staff: 108.59 (FTE)
- Student–teacher ratio: 12.17

Other information
- Website: www.mtvernonisd.net

Mount Vernon Independent School District is a school district based in Mount Vernon, Texas, United States. Located in Franklin County, a very small portion of the district extends into Hopkins County.

== Schools ==
- Mount Vernon High School (grades 9–12)
- Mount Vernon Junior High School (grades 7–8)
- Mount Vernon Intermediate School (grades 5–6)
- Mount Vernon Elementary School (grades PK–4)
