= Mount Vernon, Texas =

- Town
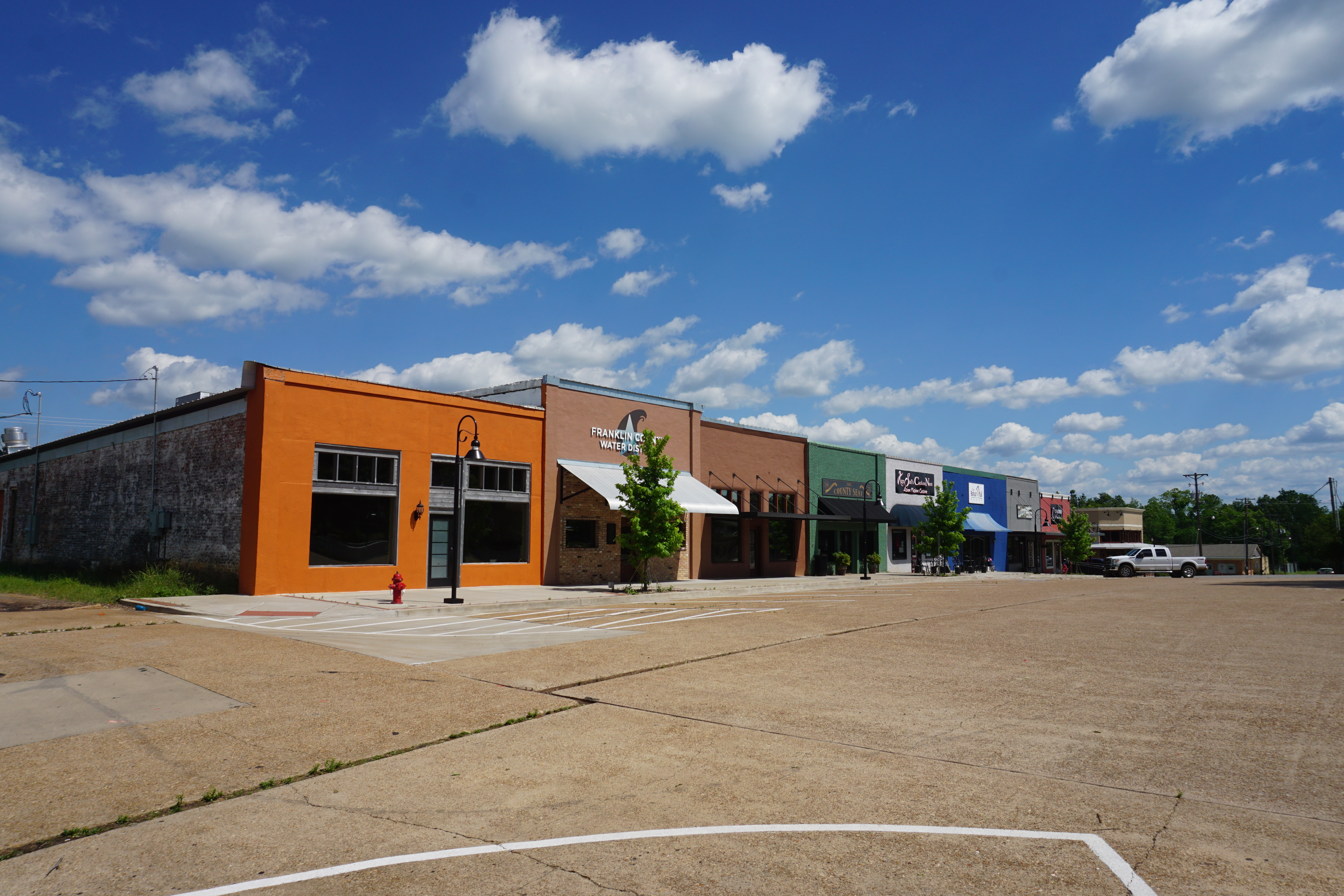
- Houston Street in downtown Mount Vernon
- Motto: "A Texas Treasure"
- Location in Franklin County and the state of Texas.
- Coordinates: 33°10′34″N 95°13′31″W
- Country: United States
- State: Texas
- County: Franklin

Government
  - Mayor: Greg Ostertag

Area
  - Total: 4.40 sq mi (11.40 km^{2})
  - Land: 4.31 sq mi (11.17 km^{2})
  - Water: 0.093 sq mi (0.24 km^{2})
- Elevation: 509 ft (155 m)

Population (2020)
  - Total: 2,491
  - Density: 635.1/sq mi (245.21/km^{2})
- Time zone: UTC-6 (Central (CST))
  - Summer (DST): UTC-5 (CDT)
- ZIP code: 75457
- Area codes: 903, 430
- FIPS code: 48-49860
- GNIS feature ID: 2413019
- Website: www.cityofmountvernontexas.com

Mount Vernon is a town and the county seat of Franklin County, Texas, United States. The population was 2,491 at the 2020 United States census.

== History ==
Mount Vernon started as a settlement near the Fanning Springs (on Holbrook Street south of the present town square). Affidavits filed to establish land titles soon after the Texas Revolution document the settlement by squatters in Spanish Texas commencing in 1818.

By 1848 the United States government established a post office, and in 1849 a formal town site was laid out on land donated by Stephen and Rebecca Keith for the town of Mount Vernon. Since there were two other Mount Vernons in Texas, the post office was called "Keith" and then "Lone Star" before the name "Mount Vernon" became available in 1875. Franklin County was carved out of Titus County in 1875, and Mount Vernon was elected county seat in competition with other communities.

The county's economy was based in agriculture with corn and cotton, followed by over 500,000 peach trees in production in the 1920s, watermelons in the 1930s, and the state's top record production of cane syrup in the 1940s. The 1936 discovery of oil on C.G. Hughes' land in the north part of the county led to a more diversified economy, with oil production continuing today combined with light industry, manufacturing, and diverse agricultural endeavors. Mount Vernon, as county seat, was assured a continuing vital existence as the economic center for the county. The town boasted churches, doctors, lawyers, and many varied stores in a time before people had the ability to travel far. The town voted to incorporate in 1910 under a mayor/council form of government. In 1911 a bond issue was passed to create a public waterworks. Electric and gas utility service followed.

The downtown area reflects a small-town atmosphere. The central plaza has a picturesque gazebo and park benches. On the north side of the square is a classical revival 1912 white limestone courthouse with a chiming clock tower. The courthouse recently underwent an extensive restoration as part of the Texas Historic Courthouse Preservation Program and has been returned to its 1912 grandeur.

History abounds in and around Mount Vernon. Over 50 homes built before World War I still stand around town and are marked with signs designating the original owners and year of construction. Tour maps are available at various locations including the Franklin County Historical Association Museums, Franklin County Chamber of Commerce, and Mount Vernon City Hall. There are over 20 official state historical markers in Franklin County. The Cherokee Trace runs along the eastern edge of the county south toward Nacogdoches. The Choctaw Trail runs through the county toward Dallas. The Bankhead Highway remains as Mount Vernon's Main Street.

== Geography ==
Mount Vernon is located at the center of Franklin County. U.S. Route 67 passes through the northern side of town as Main Street, leading east 16 miles (26 km) to Mount Pleasant and west 23 miles (37 km) to Sulphur Springs. Texas State Highway 37 passes through the western side of town, leading north 20 miles (32 km) to Bogata and south 17 miles (27 km) to Winnsboro. Interstate 30 passes through the southern end of town, with access from Exit 146 (Highway 37) and Exit 147. I-30 leads east 78 miles (126 km) to Texarkana and west 101 miles (163 km) to Dallas.

According to the United States Census Bureau, Mount Vernon has a total area of 3.69 square miles (9.55 km^{2}), of which 3.67 square miles (9.51 km^{2}) is land and 0.02 square miles (0.04 km^{2}), or 0.38%, is water.

=== Climate ===
Climate data for Mount Vernon, Texas (1991–2020 normals, extremes 1966–present)
Month	Jan	Feb	Mar	Apr	May	Jun	Jul	Aug	Sep	Oct	Nov	Dec	Year
Record high °F (°C)	82 (28)	90 (32)	90 (32)	97 (36)	97 (36)	105 (41)	109 (43)	112 (44)	108 (42)	96 (36)	89 (32)	84 (29)	112 (44)
Mean daily maximum °F (°C)	55.6 (13.1)	60.2 (15.7)	68.1 (20.1)	75.5 (24.2)	82.2 (27.9)	90.0 (32.2)	94.3 (34.6)	94.6 (34.8)	88.2 (31.2)	77.3 (25.2)	65.8 (18.8)	57.6 (14.2)	75.8 (24.3)
Daily mean °F (°C)	44.9 (7.2)	49.0 (9.4)	56.3 (13.5)	63.6 (17.6)	71.8 (22.1)	79.7 (26.5)	83.5 (28.6)	83.3 (28.5)	76.4 (24.7)	65.6 (18.7)	54.8 (12.7)	46.8 (8.2)	64.6 (18.1)
Mean daily minimum °F (°C)	34.2 (1.2)	37.7 (3.2)	44.5 (6.9)	51.8 (11.0)	61.4 (16.3)	69.4 (20.8)	72.8 (22.7)	71.9 (22.2)	64.7 (18.2)	53.8 (12.1)	43.8 (6.6)	36.1 (2.3)	53.5 (11.9)
Record low °F (°C)	2 (−17)	1 (−17)	11 (−12)	25 (−4)	39 (4)	50 (10)	55 (13)	49 (9)	38 (3)	23 (−5)	13 (−11)	−5 (−21)	−5 (−21)
Average precipitation inches (mm)	3.41 (87)	3.73 (95)	4.52 (115)	4.13 (105)	5.07 (129)	4.17 (106)	3.18 (81)	3.10 (79)	3.58 (91)	4.74 (120)	3.86 (98)	4.70 (119)	48.19 (1,224)
Average snowfall inches (cm)	0.5 (1.3)	0.9 (2.3)	0.1 (0.25)	0.0 (0.0)	0.0 (0.0)	0.0 (0.0)	0.0 (0.0)	0.0 (0.0)	0.0 (0.0)	0.0 (0.0)	0.0 (0.0)	0.1 (0.25)	1.6 (4.1)
Average precipitation days (≥ 0.01 in)	8.2	8.4	8.9	7.9	9.1	7.5	5.9	5.7	6.4	7.0	7.1	8.1	90.2
Average snowy days (≥ 0.1 in)	0.2	0.3	0.1	0.0	0.0	0.0	0.0	0.0	0.0	0.0	0.0	0.2	0.8
Source: NOAA

== Demographics ==
Historical population
Census	Pop.	Note	%±
1870	223		—
1880	311		39.5%
1890	589		89.4%
1920	1,212		—
1930	1,222		0.8%
1940	1,443		18.1%
1950	1,433		−0.7%
1960	1,338		−6.6%
1970	1,806		35.0%
1980	2,025		12.1%
1990	2,219		9.6%
2000	2,286		3.0%
2010	2,662		16.4%
2020	2,491		−6.4%
U.S. Decennial Census

Mount Vernon racial composition as of 2020 (NH = Non-Hispanic) (Note: Note: the US Census treats Hispanic/Latino as an ethnic category. This table excludes Latinos from the racial categories and assigns them to a separate category. Hispanics/Latinos can be of any race.)
Race	Number	Percentage
White (NH)	1,590	63.83%
Black or African American (NH)	305	12.24%
Native American or Alaska Native (NH)	11	0.44%
Asian (NH)	15	0.6%
Some Other Race (NH)	23	0.92%
Mixed/Multi-Racial (NH)	103	4.13%
Hispanic or Latino	444	17.82%
Total	2,491	

According to the 2000 U.S. census, there were 2,286 people, 903 households, and 582 families residing in the town. The population density was 618.7 inhabitants per square mile (238.9/km^{2}). There were 1,045 housing units at an average density of 282.8 per square mile (109.2/km^{2}). The racial makeup of the town was 77.21% White, 13.52% African American, 0.61% Native American, 0.31% Asian, 7.17% from other races, and 1.18% from two or more races. Hispanic or Latino of any race were 10.80% of the population. In 2020, its population was 2,491; at the 2020 U.S. census, its racial and ethnic makeup was predominantly non-Hispanic white.

In 2000, the median income for a household in the town was $28,824, and the median income for a family was $36,150. Males had a median income of $30,132 versus $18,707 for females. The per capita income for the town was $16,186. About 14.9% of families and 17.8% of the population were below the poverty line, including 22.6% of those under age 18 and 16.3% of those age 65 or over. The 2020 American Community Survey determined the median household income was $56,016.

== Museums and attractions ==
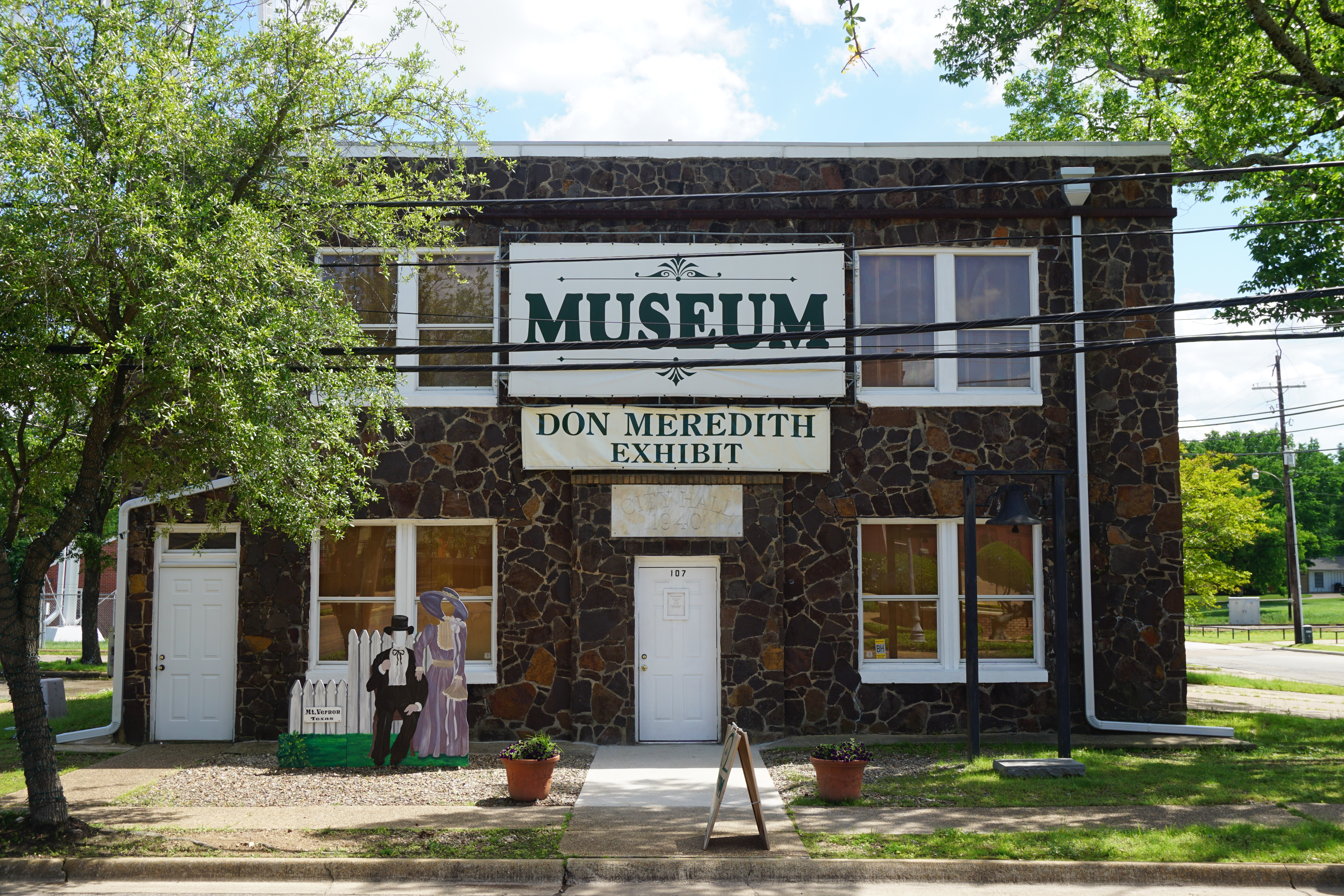
Fire Station Museum

=== Fire Station Museum ===
Housed in the 1940 WPA-financed fire station, changing exhibits from the permanent collection include nature and history displays of butterflies, bird eggs, violins, toys, seashells, antique tools, wood carvings, and Native American artifacts. The dental chair and equipment that were once used by Dr. Con Smith in Mount Vernon is on display. Exhibits upstairs include a collection of bird eggs and Native American artifacts from Franklin County and other parts of Texas and a collection of butterflies. The museum is one of only 13 museums holding eggs of the extinct Carolina parakeet, heath hen, and passenger pigeon. An exhibit of sports memorabilia related to the life and career of home-town boy and pro-football legend Don Meredith is also housed here.

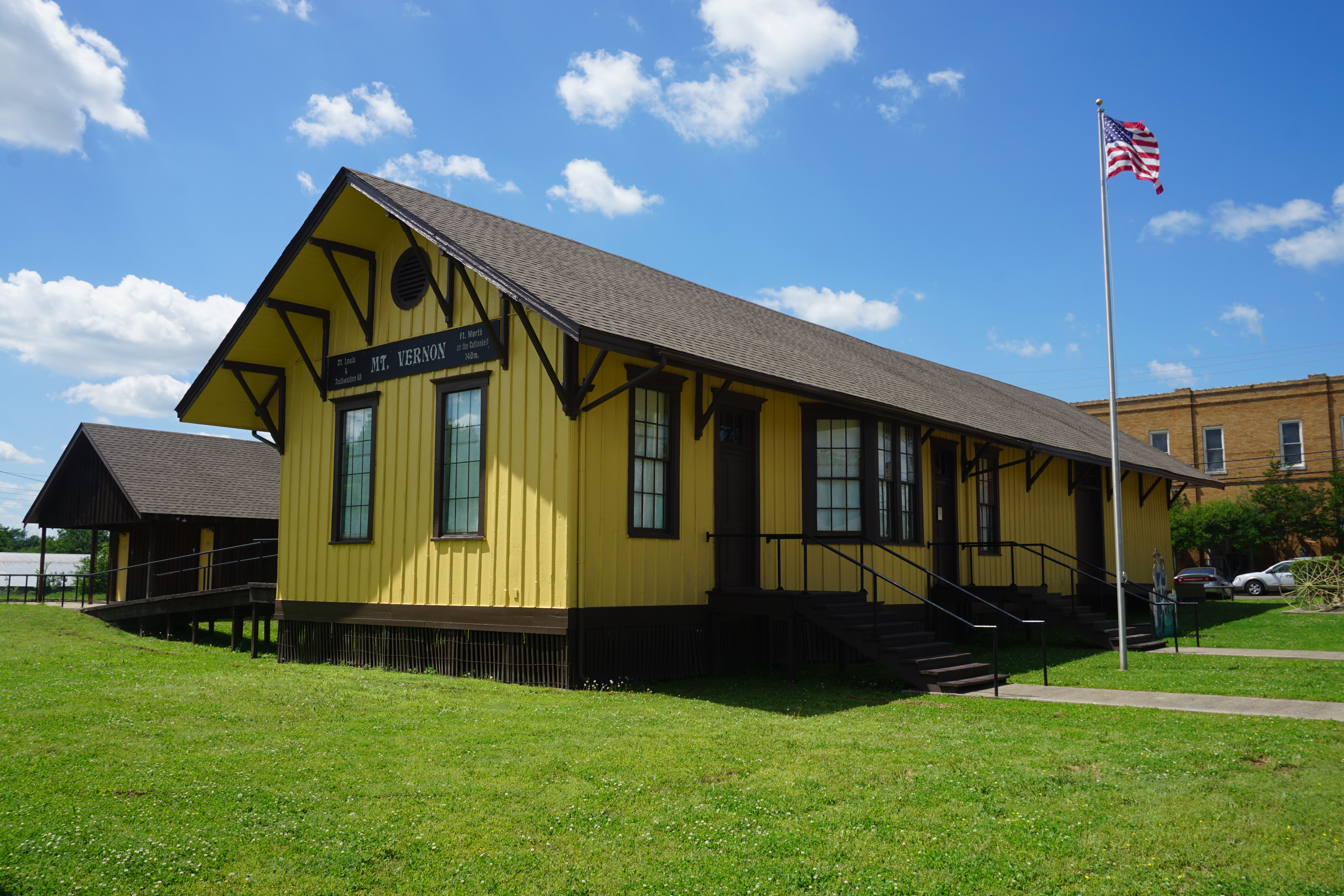
1894 Cotton Belt Railroad Depot

=== 1894 Railroad Depot ===
The restored Mount Vernon 1894 Cotton Belt Railroad Depot is a real gem that has been carefully restored pursuant to National Register standards with original colors and decor. Separate waiting rooms, designed to serve under the segregation laws at that time, today house exhibits. The central office is furnished with antiques suitable to an office at the turn of the 20th century including working telegraphy and railroading exhibits. The waiting room formerly restricted to White patrons houses a model train exhibit. The large freight room houses an 1899 Studebaker covered wagon in excellent condition and offers students a chance to reflect on the real change in transportation in America after the advent of the automobile. There is also a small 1880 log cabin that was moved onto the property, a syrup press and mill, period mule-drawn farm machinery, and a blacksmith shop.

=== Bankhead Highway Visitor Center ===
The Bankhead Highway, which opened in 1919 and ran from Washington D.C. to San Diego, was the nation's first all-weather transcontinental highway. It passes through Franklin County and serves as Mount Vernon's Main Street and follows an early Indian trading route known as the Choctaw Trail. By 1930 it was renumbered as U. S. No. 1 and was called "The Broadway of America." The Bankhead Highway Route was changed in 1937 and follows present U. S. Hwy 67. The Visitor Center includes the Lowry Pavilion, which is available to rent for special outdoor occasions, and the Dupree Park Nature Preserve and Nature Trail, a mile and a half walk through the property with special marked stations for bird sightings. Though the property gates are locked at off hours, a pedestrian gate allows admittance for individual use from dawn until dusk. A printed trail guide is available in the Visitor Center.

=== Alamo Mission Museum ===
Using a replica of the Alamo Mission as the backdrop, the mission mixes history and fun. Learn about Texas history and bring the family out for family events such as Chili Cook-off & Bluegrass Festival, Turtle Derby, Halloween Hayrides with pumpkin fun, and Redneck Rendezvous.

=== Old Mount Vernon Waterworks Plant ===
Located on Holbrook Street just south of the intersection with Rutherford Street, the first facility was built in 1911.

== Recreation ==
=== Little Creek Park ===
Mr. & Mrs. N. E. Dupree donated approximately 4.2 acres of land to the City of Mount Vernon in July 1958 for the love and respect they had for the young people of the town and surrounding communities for the creation of a park. The park consists of tennis courts, basketball courts, two playground areas, baseball field, a covered pavilion for family and social gatherings, and a walking trail. The park is located just south of the town square on Kaufman Street.

=== Lake Cypress Springs ===
Franklin County is the home of spring-fed Lake Cypress Springs and is a bass fisherman's paradise. It is surrounded by 869 acres of public parks owned and maintained by the Franklin County Water District. Camper sites, shelters, and meeting pavilions are located in various parks at the lake, as well as a marina with water playground equipment. Lake Cypress Springs was impounded in 1970 with 3,400 acres of top fishing waters. Walleye were stocked in the early days of the lake with some success. Black Bass and catfish are the prime targets of visiting anglers today. The waters of Lake Bob Sandlin back up to the dam on Cypress Creek.

== Education ==
The town is served by the Mount Vernon Independent School District and is home to the Mount Vernon High School Tigers.

On May 24, 2019, the Mount Vernon school board announced former Baylor University coach Art Briles had been given a two-year contract as the high school's varsity football coach. This decision has attracted widespread attention due to Briles having been terminated in 2016 from his position as head coach of Baylor's football team as part of the Baylor University sexual assault scandal.

== Notable people ==
- Bobby Maples — former offensive lineman with the Houston Oilers, Pittsburgh Steelers and Denver Broncos
- Don Meredith — former Dallas Cowboys quarterback and Monday Night Football broadcaster
- Greg Ostertag — former Utah Jazz center
