= ASP Westward =

Newspaper company in Houston, Texas, U.S.

- Industry: Newspaper
- Owner: 1013 Communications
- Parent: Hearst Corporation

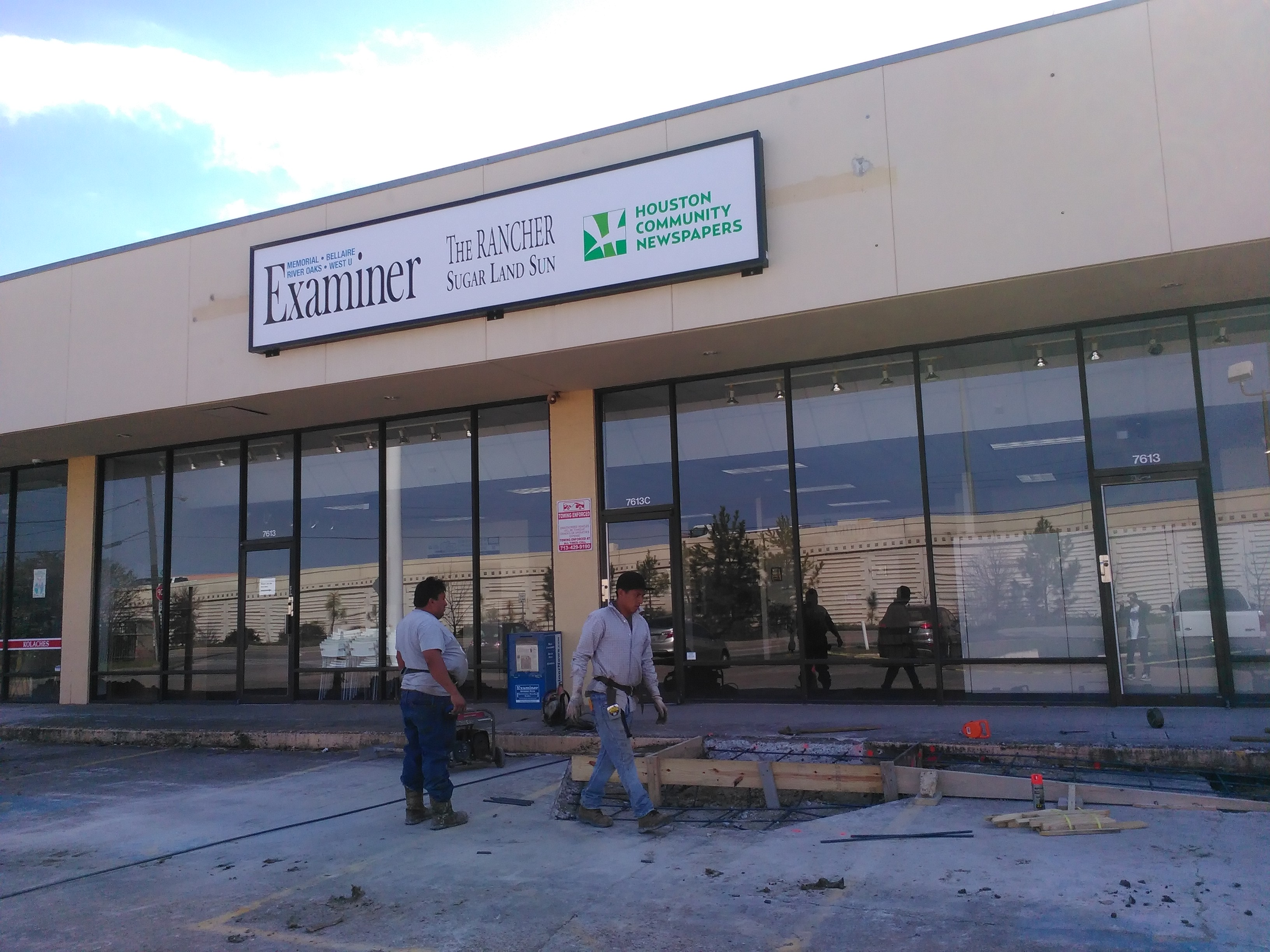
Houston Community Newspapers (ASP Westward) Examiner Newspaper Group/The Rancher/Sugar Land Sun offices

ASP Westward, L.P., or "Westward," was a local newspaper company, headquartered in Greenspoint, Houston. It is owned by 1013 Communications of Reno, Nevada.

== Houston Community Newspapers ==
In Greater Houston ASP Westward did business as Houston Community Newspapers (HCN), operating a chain of 28 local newspapers. This division was headquartered in Greenspoint, Houston. In 2016 the Hearst Corporation, the parent company of the Houston Chronicle, acquired HCN.

HCN operated several newspapers based out of different offices. Its Southwest Office-Central had the operations of the West U Examiner, River Oaks Examiner, Bellaire Examiner, Memorial Examiner, The Rancher of Katy, and the Sugar Land Sun. Its South Office-Clear Lake has the Bay Area Citizen, Deer Park Broadcaster, Friendswood Journal, Pasadena Citizen, and Pearland Journal. Its Northeast Office - Humble had the operations of the Atascocita Observer, the East Montgomery County Observer, the Humble Observer, the Kingwood Observer, and the Lake Houston Observer. The North Office - The Woodlands had operations of the Spring Observer and The Woodlands Observer. The operations of The Courier were based out of the North Office-Conroe. The Northeast Office-Cleveland housed the operations of the Cleveland Advocate, the Dayton News, and the Easttex Advocate. The Northwest Office - Tomball housed the operations of the Cypress Creek Mirror, the Magnolia Potpourri, and the Tomball Potpourri. The Mirror had Cypress/Cy-Fair and Champions/Klein divisions.

=== HCN History ===
In April 2006, prior to the purchase of the Examiner Newspaper Group, another local newspaper company, HCN had 31 newspapers. In 2006 George Boehme sold the Examiner Newspaper Group to ASP Westward, for $2.1 million. At the time, the purchase price was not disclosed.

HCN hired Boehme as a regional publisher and he held this job for one year. In May 2007, Boehme stopped working for the company. He started InstantNewsNetwork.com Inc. weeks after he left HCN. Boehme announced on January 7, 2008, that it would purchase FortBendNow.com Inc. from Bob Dunn. Later that month HCN announced that it was suing Boehme for violating non-soliciation and non-competition provisions of the purchase agreement.

In 2006 the Houston Press ranked the Fort Bend/Southwest Sun the "Best Community Newspaper Houston 2006".

In 2010 the Houston Press ranked the Examiner Newspaper Group division of the HCN the "Best Community Newspaper Houston 2010".

1013 Communications, a Reno, Nevada company, acquired the company including the HCN group in 2012. In 2016 the Hearst Corporation, the parent company of the Houston Chronicle, acquired HCN. As part of the deal the Examiner papers became a part of the Hearst Corporation.

Ray Biggerstaff was the publisher of The Woodlands Villager and The Courier from 2011 to 2013.

== East Texas Community Newspapers ==
In portions of East Texas ASP Westward did business as East Texas Community Newspapers (ETCN). This division was headquartered in Longview, and before that, in Carthage.

As of 2014, the ETCN newspapers included:

- Longview News-Journal
- The Marshall News Messenger
- Mineola Monitor
- Daingerfield Bee
- Big Sandy & Hawkins Journal
- Pittsburg Gazette
- Gladewater Mirror
- Atlanta Citizens Journal
- Cass County Shopper
- Panola Watchman
- Panola County Shopper
- Grand Saline Sun
- Edgewood Enterprise
- Wood County Democrat (Quitman)
- Lindale News & Times
- Bowie County Tribune (New Boston)
- DeKalb News
- Overton Press
- Cass County Sun (Linden)

=== ETCN history ===
In June 2012 Texas Community Media LLC announced that it had agreed to purchase multiple newspapers from ASP Westward. These papers included the daily Longview News-Journal, the Marshall News Messenger, and twelve weekly newspapers. The weeklies included, the Atlanta Citizens Journal, The Big Sandy & Hawkins Journal, the Bowie County Citizens Tribune, the Cass County Sun, The Daingerfield Bee, The Gladewater Mirror, The Grand Saline Sun, the Lindale News & Times, the Mineola Monitor, the Panola Watchman, The Pittsburg Gazette, and the Wood County Democrat. The weekly and daily newspapers had a combined circulation of almost 300,000, with the News-Journal having an over 23,000 daily paid circulation.

== Colorado Community Newspapers ==
Colorado Community Newspapers was headquartered in Castle Rock and included: Castle Rock News-Press, Centennial Citizen, Douglas County News-Press, Elbert County News, Gleneagle/Black Forest, Highlands Ranch Herald, Littleton Independent, Lone Tree Voice, Parker Chronicle, Pikes Peak Courier View, Teller County Extra, The Tribune/Monument, and Tri-Lakes Tribune/Tri-Lakes. It was acquired in 2002 and sold in 2012 to Macari-Healey Publishing Company, of Golden, Colorado.
