= Golden, Texas =

Golden
- unincorporated community
- Location within Texas Location within the United States
- Coordinates: 32°43′46″N 95°33′47″W
- Country: United States
- State: Texas
- County: Wood
- Elevation: 427 ft (130 m)
- Area codes: 430, 903
- GNIS feature ID: 1336649

Golden is an unincorporated community in Wood County, Texas, United States. According to the Handbook of Texas, the community had a population of 156 in 2000.

== History ==
The Golden area was settled initially as early as 1865. The community wasn't formally formed until the late 1870s when a sawmill was constructed by C.W. Tucker. The Missouri, Kansas and Texas Railroad was built through Golden in 1881 on its Greenville to Mineola line. The town was named after railway construction engineer John Golden. The railroad tie-cutting industry added to the local agrarian economy. By 1885, Golden had a post office, and the community had a population of 100 by 1890. That year, it had three churches and several businesses, including a shingle mill, a cotton gin, two sawmills, a vineyard, and a nursery. The population grew to 300 six years later. A bank opened in the city in 1907. The community had a population zenith of 650 in 1914 and boasted a telephone connection, and the Golden Rule, a community newspaper. By 1925, the population had dwindled to 400. The bank closed in 1931. The population continued to fall throughout the middle of the 20th century. In 1965, the railroad abandoned its line through Golden. The community thrived on growing watermelons and truck farming. The population from the 1960s through 2000 was reported as 156. There were four businesses and three churches in Golden in 1988. The number of businesses grew to 21 in 2000.

On October 24, 2010, an EF0 tornado struck Golden, uprooting some trees.

Two other newspapers that served the community were the Wood County Monitor and Mineola Monitor.

The Reneau building in the community was added to the National Register of Historic Places in 2013.

=== Sweet Potato Festival ===
Every fourth Saturday in October since 1982, the town hosts a Sweet Potato Festival. This celebration has been featured twice on The Oprah Winfrey Show.

== Geography ==
Golden is located at the intersection of FM 1799 and 779 off U.S. Highway 69, 4 mi (6.4 km) northwest of Mineola, 5 mi (8.0 km) southeast of Alba, 33 mi (53 km) northwest of Tyler, and 80 mi (130 km) east of Dallas in the southwestern section of Wood County.

== Education ==
The Friendship School was established around 1880 and may have previously been part of a community of the same name. The Golden School District reported 232 students in 11 grades by 1932. It continued to operate in 1988.

Public education in the community of Golden is provided by the Alba-Golden Independent School District.

== Notable people ==
- Kacey Musgraves (b. 1988), Grammy-winning country music artist, singer, and songwriter. Her single "Dime Store Cowgirl" has lyrics mentioning the town, and the photoshoot for her fourth album Golden Hour took place in and around Golden. Her 2026 album, "Middle of Nowhere", reflects on returning to Golden.
- Harold Simmons (May 13, 1931 – December 28, 2013), businessman, owner of Contran Corporation.

== Sources ==
- Sweet Potato at Golden Sweet Potato Festival
