= Jade Helm 15 conspiracy theories =

Conspiracy theories from a 2015 military exercise

The Jade Helm 15 conspiracy theories were based on the Jade Helm 15 United States military training exercise, which took place in multiple U.S. states between July 15 and September 15, 2015. The exercise, which involved 1,200 personnel from four of the five branches of the U.S. military, was designed to train soldiers in skills needed to operate in overseas combat environments, including maneuvering through civilian populations. The announcements of these training exercises raised concerns and generated conspiracy theories, mostly from Alex Jones, that the exercise was a hostile military takeover.

== Exercise details ==
The joint exercise in realistic military training (RMT) known as Jade Helm 15 was sponsored by the United States Special Operations Command (USSOCOM or SOCOM) and involved the United States Army Special Operations Command (USASOC) and Joint Special Operations Command (JSOC) with other U.S. military units in multiple states, including Texas, Arizona, Florida, Louisiana, Mississippi, New Mexico, and Utah. Its stated purpose was "to improve the Special Operations Forces' capability as part of the National Security Strategy". It was coordinated and led from Eglin Air Force Base, an Air Force Materiel Command (AFMC) base in northwest Florida.

Approximately 1,200 troops were engaged over the course of the exercise. They were "mainly Army Green Berets, but also a small group of Navy SEALs and Air Force special operations troops as well as conventional Army infantry", although the initial request to state officials from USSOCOM listed elements of the United States Marine Corps Forces Special Operations Command (MARSOC), Marine expeditionary units, the 82nd Airborne Division, and "interagency partners" as participants. Troops engaging in the exercise assumed the roles of either occupying or resistance forces. Most locations were in sparsely populated arid regions near small towns. Some participants wore civilian attire and drove civilian vehicles. Maps of the exercise included areas of the United States such as Colorado and California where no actual operations were planned. The locations in Texas include Bastrop, Smithville, Big Spring, Caddo Lake, Caldwell, Christoval, College Station, Dell City, Eldorado, Goliad, Junction, Leakey, Menard, Mountain Home, San Angelo, San Antonio, and Victoria.

USSOCOM claimed that "the size and scope of Jade Helm sets this one apart" from previous training exercises, such as Derna Bridge or Robin Sage. In Bastrop, 60 soldiers took part, including the presence of two Humvee vehicles and a "water buffalo" water tank. Private land offered by residents would be used for the exercise, though he noted that they would not be paid for the land or receive a tax break of any kind. Lastoria also claimed that $150,000 in revenue would be brought to the area because of food, fuel, and shopping.

Journalists were not allowed to embed in the operation, due to the "scope and scale" of the training exercise.

== Conspiracy theories ==
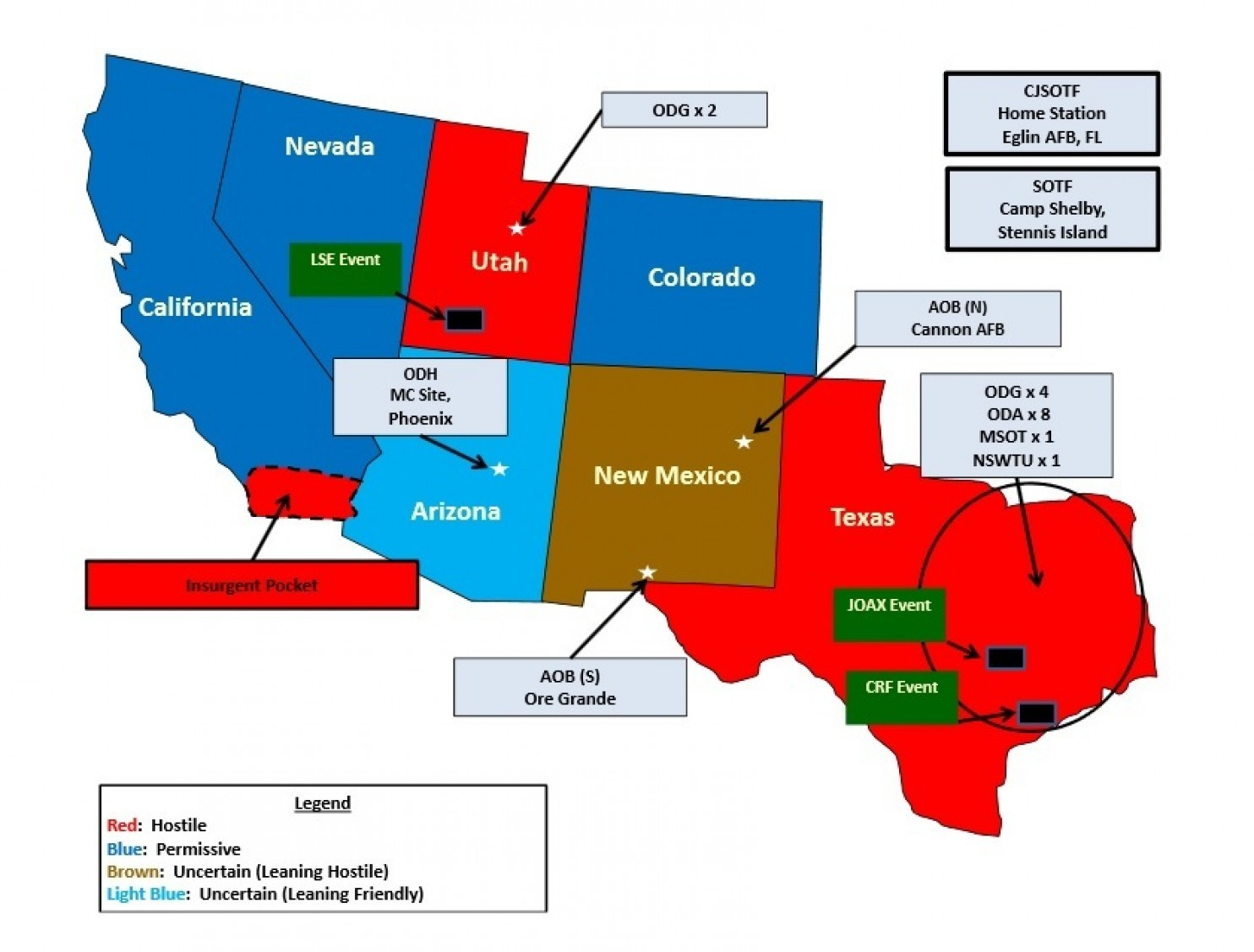
U.S. Army Special Operations Command map, depicting the US military plans during the Jade Helm 15 exercise

The conspiracy theories seem to emanate from the map shown here from the U.S. Army Special Operations Command which divides the region into four colors, with two "hostile" states, two "permissive" states, two states leaning one way or the other, and California divided. Jim Shea of the Hartford Courant wrote that the conspiracy theories included: a "psychological operation aimed at getting people used to seeing military forces on the streets" so that they do not realize when an invasion actually takes place; an international operation aimed to seize people's firearms; recently closed Walmarts used by the military to "stockpile supplies for Chinese troops who will be arriving to disarm Americans"; and a military plan to "round up political dissidents" and "remove key political figures" who may be against the imposition of martial law. Other theories have described Jade Helm 15 as a "secret plot" to impose martial law, confiscate firearms, invade Texas, and institute "total population control."

The conspiracy theories also included concern about the name of the exercise, with the "jade" possibly referring to China, or possibly an acronym for artificial intelligence developed by the U.S. military. Conspiracy theorist and Texas radio host Alex Jones said that "helm" is an acronym for "Homeland Eradication of Local Militants".

Eric Johnston formed a "Counter Jade Helm" group to monitor the training operations and to practice "counterinsurgency" tactics and intelligence-gathering. In August, three men were arrested by the FBI and accused of plotting to "resist Jade Helm" with weapons and home-made bombs. Two of the three men reportedly told the owner of a military surplus store that they believed Jade Helm "is a cover for the imposition of martial law in the United States".

There was some tie-in between the Jade Helm 15 exercise and a resurgence of the FEMA camps conspiracy theory with the exercise raising fear that it was a dry run for forcing citizens into internment camps. These fears were demonstrated to have been unfounded when the exercise was completed and no one was placed into a camp.

=== Comet or asteroid impact ===
Some conspiracy theorists have connected the Jade Helm 15 military exercise with an apocalypse caused by a comet or asteroid striking the Earth. The Jade Helm 15 military exercise had an ending date of September 15, 2015, which is the same month identified by some conspiracy theorists for the catastrophic impact of a comet or asteroid.

The conspiracy theorists claim that Jade Helm 15 is a dress rehearsal for the imposition of martial law which would be implemented in the event of a catastrophe of this level of severity. However, the NASA Near Earth Object Program publishes the Sentry Risk Table, which is a list that identifies such threats, and the list does not include any object with a high Torino Scale number (a measure of the severity of the threat) for 2015. Also, a NASA spokesperson said, "NASA knows of no asteroid or comet currently on a collision course with Earth". Some conspiracy theorists claimed that the object has been tracked for years. They asserted that the object name is known but its published coordinates and orbit information are incorrect, and the threat is not publicly listed because of the belief that panic would ensue. The apocalypse failed to happen on September 15, 2015.

== Reactions ==
The Austin American-Statesman newspaper noted that after plans and maps of the exercise were made public, there was an "explosion of outrage on social media after the release of the map, which labeled Texas, Utah and the southern tip of California as 'hostile.'" There was also speculation that shuttered Walmart stores would be used for "guerrilla-warfare staging areas and FEMA processing camps", though this theory was debunked by the website Snopes.

A survey of registered Republicans by Public Policy Polling in May 2015, found that 32% thought that "the Government is trying to take over Texas", and that half of all Tea Party supporters were concerned about an imminent Texas invasion.

Greg Capers, sheriff of San Jacinto County, published a letter in the Cleveland Advocate (of Cleveland, Texas), in response to numerous phone calls from citizens, in which he criticized alternative news sources for spreading inaccurate information about the exercise, and encouraged citizens to "utilize legitimate mainstream news sources" for those interested in accurate information.

=== Politicians ===
On April 28, Texas Governor Greg Abbott ordered the Texas State Guard to monitor the operation, writing: "During the training operation, it is important that Texans know [that] their safety, constitutional rights, private property rights and civil liberties will not be infringed", and requesting "regular updates on the progress and safety of the Operation". Abbott received significant bipartisan criticism. One critic was Republican state representative Todd Smith, who said Abbott was "pandering to idiots" at taxpayers' expense. Former CIA and NSA director Michael Hayden said that the conspiracy theory "got so much traction that the governor of Texas had to call up the National Guard". The Texas Observer disagreed, stating that "the issue got hardly any traction at all outside the fringe until Abbott gave it his seal of approval".

On May 2, 2015, Texas senator Ted Cruz told the South Carolina Republican Party's annual convention that he had "reached out to the Pentagon to inquire about this exercise."

We are assured [that] it is a military training exercise. I have no reason to doubt those assurances, but I understand the reason for concern and uncertainty, because when the federal government has not demonstrated itself to be trustworthy in this administration, the natural consequence is that many citizens don't trust what it is saying.

U.S. Representative Louie Gohmert said in a statement on May 5, 2015, that his "office has been inundated with calls referring to the Jade Helm 15 military exercise" with concerns that the U.S. Army is preparing for "modern-day martial law". He alluded to a notorious remark made by Barack Obama, who claimed that Pennsylvanians were "bitter" and "cling to guns or religion": "I was rather appalled that the hostile areas amazingly have a Republican majority, 'cling to their guns and religion,' and believe in the sanctity of the United States Constitution". He asserted that "the map of the exercise needs to change, the names on the map need to change, and the tone of the exercise needs to be completely revamped so the federal government is not intentionally practicing war against its own states."

In a November 2015 GQ interview, President Obama described Jade Helm as "his favorite conspiracy theory".

=== Media ===
One of the first versions of the conspiracy appeared in All News Pipeline. It was later spread by conspiracy theorist and radio host Alex Jones, who said on his Infowars radio program and website that the federal government was preparing to invade Texas. "They're going to practice breaking into things and stuff. This is going to be hellish," Jones said. "Now this is just a cover for deploying the military on the streets ... This is an invasion ... in preparation for the financial collapse and maybe even Obama not leaving office." The conspiracy theories also appeared repeatedly on the conservative Drudge Report website.

After Abbott's response, Dallas Morning News columnist Jacquielynn Floyd wrote a column titled, "Abbott should counter, not cater to, Texans' crazy Jade Helm fears," noting that Abbott's "response to this nut-studded fruitcake of fear was unfortunate." On April 29, White House Press Secretary Josh Earnest addressed the concerns of critics in the regular press briefing, saying, "I have no idea what he's thinking," regarding Abbott's letter to the Texas Guard. "In no way will the constitutional rights or civil liberties of any American citizen be infringed upon while this exercise is being conducted."

The New York Times said that "numerous Republican elected officials in Texas have publicly embraced the ideology, conspiracy theories and anti-Obama sentiments of the far right", and reported that critics of Abbott pointed to the "disproportionate influence" of far-right activists over Republican primaries in the state.

Comedian Jon Stewart addressed the debate around the exercises in a segment on The Daily Show on May 4 called "Fear and Absent Danger", noting that previous military exercises before Obama's presidency had not raised similar concerns among conspiracy theorists and then-governor Rick Perry.

=== Polls ===
A survey by Public Policy Polling between May 7 and May 10, 2015, found that 32% of 685 Republican primary voters believed "the government is trying to take over Texas", 40% believed "the government is not trying to take over Texas" and 28% were "unsure".

== Russian disinformation ==
Clint Watts and two others in the FBI began to notice Russian disinformation campaigns starting in April 2014. Watts said that Russian-driven efforts to spread misinformation were involved with Jade Helm 15. In 2017, Facebook shut down a page called "Heart of Texas" which was found to be associated with a Russian company promoting disinformation, including promoting the Jade Helm conspiracy.

On May 3, 2018, The Texas Tribune reported that Michael Hayden, a former director of the CIA and NSA said that the "hysteria" surrounding the training exercise "was fueled by Russians wanting to dominate 'the information space.'" Hayden said that Russian bots were used to spread misinformation.

The Texas Observer's Christopher Hooks acknowledged the involvement of Russian bots but argued that blaming them for the controversy was an inversion of cause-and-effect, and that "Russian trolls simply echoed existing dysfunctions in American politics" rather than causing them. Hooks said that the problem was the paranoia and fear present in Texas politics, and blamed Texas politicians, including Governor Abbott, who cater to this conspiratorial fringe.

== Legacy ==
During the second Trump administration, The Intercept reported that "InfoWars' Jade Helm coverage is now seemingly scrubbed from the site" and wrote that "the publication has shifted from condemning the Pentagon as the harbinger of American apocalypse to joining its official press corps."

== See also ==
- Operation Gotham Shield
