= Brian Karem =

American journalist, political analyst

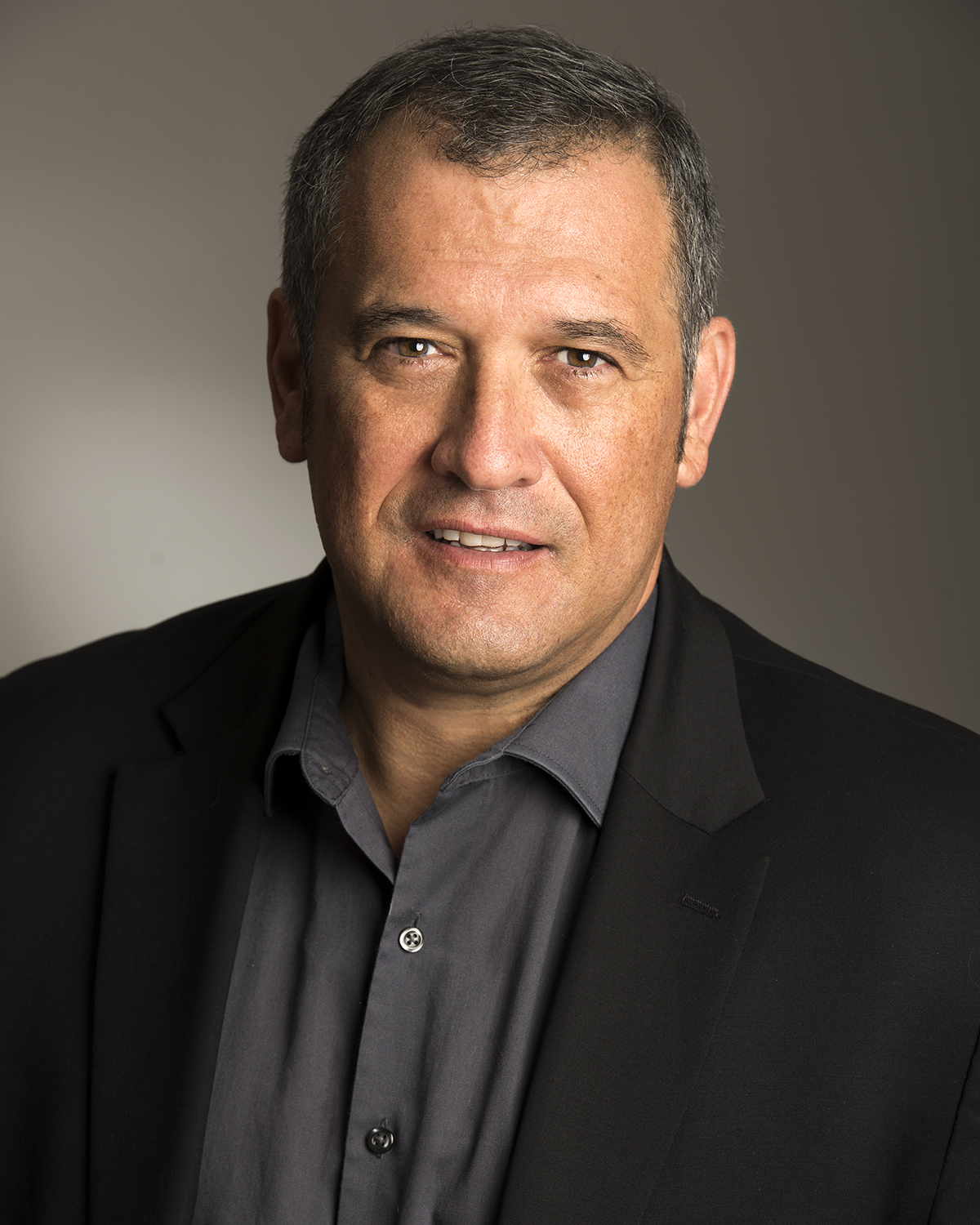
- Brian Karem
- Born: Brian James Karem; March 10, 1961 (age 65); Louisville, Kentucky, U.S.
- Education: University of Missouri (BA)
- Occupations: Journalist, writer
- Years active: 1983–present
- Employer(s): Playboy, CNN
- Known for: Jailed for not revealing sources
- Notable work: Marked for Death, Shield the Source, Innocent Victims, Above the Law
- Spouse: Pamela J. Russell (m. 1983)
- Children: 3
- Website: justaskthequestion.com

Brian James Karem (born March 10, 1961) is an American journalist who has been a White House correspondent for Playboy and political analyst for CNN. He also hosts the "Just Ask The Question" podcast.

In 1991, Karem received the National Press Club Freedom of the Press award for refusing to reveal his sources in a story related to the killing of a police officer in Texas.

== Early life and education ==
Karem was born on March 10, 1961, in Louisville, Kentucky. His great-grandfather emigrated to the United States from Lebanon. After finishing Seneca High School in 1979, he attended the University of Missouri in Columbia, Missouri, playing football and graduating with a degree in journalism in 1983. The same year, he married his wife, Pamela J. Russell.

== Career ==
In 1983, Karem joined The Montgomery County Courier in Conroe, Texas, as sports editor. After leaving the Courier in 1984, Karem switched to television joining WKYT-TV in Lexington, Kentucky, as a political reporter.

He returned to Texas in 1986 to work at KMOL-TV in San Antonio. In 1990, Karem was jailed in contempt of court for refusing to reveal the name of a source who arranged an interview with a suspect involved in killing a police officer. The United States District Court for the Western District of Texas refused Karem's appeal for release, stating "Karem has no right to refuse to disclose the names of his confidential sources." Karem's additional appeals were denied first by the 5th Circuit Court of Appeals and then the United States Supreme Court. Karem was released after he complied with authorities following a phone call with his source, Debora Ledesma. Ledesma, however claimed that she never asked for confidentiality, contradicting Karem's claims.

During the Gulf War, he was one of the first reporters to enter Kuwait City after its liberation. During the National Drug Summit in San Antonio, Texas in 1992, Karem asked then President George H. W. Bush to comment on claims referring to the event as a "joke". Karem lost his job after the incident but later gained an interview with Sam Donaldson on ABC and a mention from The Tonight Show host Jay Leno.

Following his termination from KMOL, Karem joined the television program America's Most Wanted as a producer and correspondent. While covering the war on drugs, he became the first American journalist allowed inside Pablo Escobar's palatial prison after Escobar's escape from Colombian authorities. In 1997, Karem joined WDAF-TV in Kansas City, Missouri, as an investigative reporter. While at WDAF-TV, Karem alleges that his superiors suppressed a story on the pesticide chemical, Dursban, prompting him to leave the station.

Between 2004 and 2018, Karem served as the executive editor of the Montgomery County Sentinel in Rockville, Maryland, and authored the Editor's Notebook, a column covering Montgomery County, Maryland. Between 2012 and 2015, he was also the publisher for MoCoVox.Com, an online content provider.

While covering the Trump presidency, Karem gained attention for his interactions with administration officials. On June 27, 2017, Karem confronted then deputy White House Press Secretary Sarah Huckabee Sanders on "inflammatory" comments about the performance of the press while covering President Donald Trump. One year later, Karem confronted Sanders again on the Administration's policy of seizing children from their parents at United States border crossings, saying "Come on, Sarah, you're a parent! Don't you have any empathy for what these people are going through? They have less than you do. Sarah, come on, seriously."

On July 11, 2019, following an event at the White House Rose Garden, Karem called conservative social media representatives in attendance "a group of people eager for demonic possession." The remark prompted Sebastian Gorka, a former deputy assistant to President Trump and now a radio talk-show host, to confront Karem, yelling across the lawn: "And you're a journalist, right?" Karem replied with what some consider a taunt saying, "Come on over here and talk to me, brother. We can go outside and have a long conversation." Accusing Karem of issuing a threat, Gorka walked across the lawn yelling, "You're not a journalist! You're a punk!" in front of a row of White House media and cameras.

Following the July 11 incident, the White House Press Office suspended Karem's press pass on August 2, 2019. Karem filed a lawsuit in response before U.S. District Court for the District of Columbia, Judge Rudolph Contreras blocked the suspension. On June 5, 2020, Judge David S. Tatel of the United States Court of Appeals for the District of Columbia Circuit ruled the White House Press Office wrongly suspended Karem's press pass.

In 2023, Karem wrote an article for Salon titled "Far-right MAGA theocrats: Most dangerous threat to America".

== Music ==
Karem is the lead singer of the Rhythm Bandits Band, playing shows in Montgomery County, Maryland.

== Awards ==
- National Press Club Freedom of the Press Award
- Pieringer Award for Valor and Journalist Excellence

== Books ==
- Shield the Source, (New Horizon Press; 1992) ISBN 0882821040.
- Above the Law, (Pinnacle; 1998) ISBN 0786010312.
- Warning Signs: A Guidebook for Parents: How to Read the Early Signals of Low Self-Esteem, Addiction, and Hidden Violence in Your Kids, co-author with John Kelly. (LifeLine Press; 1998) ISBN 0786010312.
- Spin Control: Essays and Short Stories, (Brookeville Press; 2000) ISBN 0967651611.
- Innocent Victims, (Pinnacle; 2001) ISBN 0786010312.
- Marked for Death, (Avon; 2005) ISBN 0060524715.

== See also ==
- Trump administration family separation policy
