= Mineola Monitor =

US Weekly newspaper

- Type: Weekly newspaper
- Format: Broadsheet
- Founded: 1876
- Ceased publication: 2016
- City: Mineola, Texas
- Country: USA
- OCLC number: 14509482

The Mineola Monitor was a newspaper in Mineola, Texas serving Wood County, Texas and the communities of Alba, Golden, Hawkins and parts of unincorporated Wood County.

== History ==
The newspaper was established in 1876 by D.C. Williams. In 1907 the Monitor was purchased by J.A. Thomas. Although a weekly newspaper, it was published as a daily twice during its history. The Mineola Monitor was recently owned by ASP Westward before being sold to Texas Community Media, LLC. In 2012, the newspaper was purchased by Bluebonnet Communications.

The owner from 1955 to 1963 was Neil Harle, who also owned the Grand Saline Sun. He sold the Monitor in 1963 to Editors, Inc., which also owned the Lindale News and the Wood County Record.

The Mineola Monitor was merged with the Wood County Democrat in 2016 to form the Wood County Monitor.
