= Wood County Monitor =

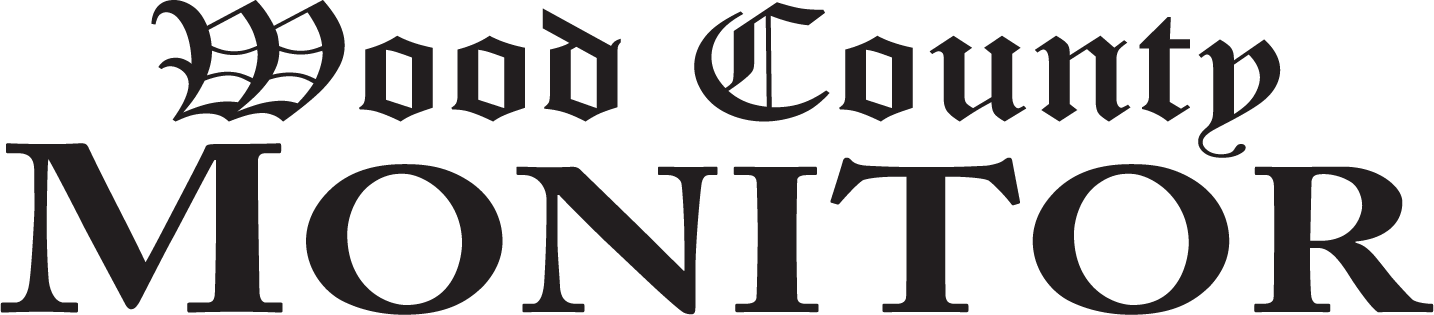
- Type: Weekly newspaper
- Format: Broadsheet
- Owner: James Taylor
- Founders: D.C. Williams (Mineola Monitor); Alfred Padon (Wood County Democrat)
- Publisher: James Taylor
- Editor: Carley Tucker
- Founded: 1876; 150 years ago as Mineola Monitor; 1893; 133 years ago as Wood County Democrat
- Relaunched: 2016; 10 years ago as Wood County Monitor
- City: Mineola, Texas; Quitman, Texas
- Country: United States
- Circulation: 1,477 (as of 2023)
- OCLC number: 1097161696
- Website: woodcountymonitor.com

The Wood County Monitor is a weekly newspaper serving Wood County, Texas. In August 2016, newspaper operations of the Mineola Monitor and the Wood County Democrat were merged by their owner, Bluebonnet Publishing, to form the Wood County Monitor.

== History ==
=== Mineola Monitor ===
The Mineola Monitor was a newspaper in Mineola, Texas serving Wood County, Texas and the communities of Alba, Golden, Hawkins and parts of unincorporated Wood County. It was established in 1876 by D.C. Williams. In 1907 the Monitor was purchased by J. A. Thomas.

=== Wood County Democrat ===
Alfred Padon was editor and publisher of the Wood County Democrat when it was founded in 1893 in Quitman, Texas with financial support from local area merchants. The newspaper's original site included a Vaughan Ideal hand-operated presses. The entire operation was reported to have cost around US$800 (equivalent to $28,667 in 2025) to start-up.

The newspaper's main objective upon its founding was the opposition of Populism. Prior to that, Padon had been publisher of the Mineola Monitor. Quitman businessmen approached him about founding a newspaper in the county seat.

Padon resigned as editor and publisher in 1895, and the paper was briefly operated by Grogan and Goodwin for the owners, which included a Dr. Leath and Hix Rhodes. Then in 1896, Perno Thomas became editor. He later assumed ownership and sold a half interest in the plant to Earl Jones in 1901, but later repurchased it. In 1903, Clyde Jordan of Alba purchased an interest in the paper, but eventually Thomas again regained full ownership.

The paper merged with the Mineola Monitor to form the Wood County Monitor in 2016, ending publication under the Democrat masthead.

== Merger ==
Prior to the merger, the Mineola Monitor operated under its own masthead in Mineola, and the Wood County Democrat operated under its own masthead in Quitman. Staffing at the newspapers did not change, and the staff of both newspapers were merged.
