= Wood County Airport =

Wood County Airport may refer to:

- Wood County Airport (Texas) in Wood County, Texas, United States (FAA: JDD)
- Wood County Airport (Ohio) in Wood County, Ohio, United States (FAA: 1G0)
- South Wood County Airport in Wood County, Wisconsin, United States (FAA: ISW)

== See also ==
- Mid-Ohio Valley Regional Airport in Wood County, West Virginia (also known as Wood County Airport)
