= Addie E. McFarland High School =

Segregated high school in Mineola, Texas, United States

Location
- 708 S. Stone Street; Mineola, Wood County, Texas 75773; United States
- Coordinates: 32.6583°N 95.4949°W

Information
- School type: Segregated African American High School high school
- Opened: 1889
- Closed: 1966
- School district: formerly Mineola Independent School District
- Grades: 9–10; 9–12
- Color: Purple
- Mascot: Bears
- Yearbook: The Whitsonian

Addie E. McFarland High School was the segregated high school serving African American students from 1950 to 1965 in Mineola, Texas. The institution had prior been named Mineola Colored High School (1947 to 1950) and South Ward High School (1889 to 1947).

The building that served as Addie E. McFarland High School became the Addie E. McFarland Community Center.

== History ==
In 1884, the Texas Legislature passed legislation requiring Wood County, Texas to be divided up into free school districts, including several African American schools. However, what became South Ward/Mineola Colored/McFarland wasn't among the African American schools the legislature authorized. Instead, schools for African Americans in Mineola were first organized under Professor Robert Mason Jones in 1889, with Professor O.C. Veasy as principal.

In 1927, an older school structure was destroyed by fire. Sometime between 1937 and 1939, a new structure was built. During 1947–1948, the school became exclusively a high school and the name of the school was changed from South Ward School to Mineola Colored High School. During this time, the school only went to the tenth grade. The first graduating class was in 1948. During the 1950s, the name of the school was changed to McFarland High School to honor Addie McFarland, a longtime teacher who taught in the community. The last graduating class from McFarland was in 1966; the next fall, students attended Mineola High School. McFarland was closed when the schools integrated.

== South Ward High School ==
As of May 1949, when a desegregation lawsuit filed against nearby Winnsboro schools put the Mineola colored schools under scrutiny, South Ward High School reportedly offered 20 courses including home economics and had a faculty of nine teachers. While students in white Mineola High School were offered an elective in English History, Negro History was offered in its place at the South Ward High School. A new brick edition to the school opened in the fall semester of the 1949–1950 school year.

== Addie E. McFarland Community Center ==
The site of McFarland School was owned by Timothy and Maxine Hancock at some point after Mineola ISD sold off the site and buildings. The Hancock family donated the school and grounds to the school association and the Meredith Foundation donated grant funds to remodel the facility. The building may be rented for various functions by community members in Mineola.

== Notable alumni ==
- Willie Brown: Class of 1951 (Mineola Colored High School), former Mayor of San Francisco and former Speaker of the California Assembly.
