= Lake Holbrook =

- Location within Texas Location within the United States
- Location: Wood County, near Mineola, Texas, United States
- Coordinates: 32.7006°N 95.5548°W
- Type: Reservoir
- Primary inflows: Lankford Creek
- Basin countries: United States
- Max. length: 2.24 mi (3.60 km)
- Max. width: 0.84 mi (1.35 km)
- Surface area: 653 acres (264 ha)
- Max. depth: 30 ft (9.1 m)
- Surface elevation: 341 ft (104 m)
- Settlements: Mineola

Lake Holbrook is a lake in Wood County, Texas, United States. It is roughly 3 miles northwest of the city of Mineola, Texas, which has a population of 4,823 according to he 2020 census. Lake Holbrook is a part of the Sabine River basin and sit on Keys Creek.

== Hydrology ==
Lake Holbrook is an impoundment of Keys Creek. It has a maximum water capacity of 7,700 acre-feet to 7,990 acre-feet depending on the source. The lake has a surface area of 653 acres and a maximum depth of 30 feet. The crest elevation of the lake is 372 feet above sea level.

== Ecoregion ==
Lake Holbrook sits in the Post Oak Savannah ecoregion of Texas. This area has an average rainfall of 28-40 inches per year and a temperature range of 65-70 °F.

== Terrestrial ecosystem type ==
The terrestrial ecosystem of the region around Lake Holbrook is gentle rolling hills varying from 300–800 feet in elevation. The soils around Lake Holbrook tend to be sand sized, light colored, and acidic in the regions of higher elevation and dark grey and acidic, with sand to clay sized particles.

== Flora ==
Lake Holbrook flora is primarily cattails and other emerging aquatic plants. There are very few submerged species.

== Fauna ==
The primary prey fish of Lake Holbrook are Bluegill and Redear Sunfish. The larger fish species consist of Largemouth Bass, Channel Catfish, and Black and White Crappie.

== Ecological studies ==
The Texas Parks and Wildlife Department have done a few studies on Lake Holbrook in order to inform, protect, and improve sport fishing.

== Uses/purpose ==
The primary use of lake Holbrook is flood control and recreation.

== Recreation ==
The primary form of recreation used in Lake Holbrook is fishing.

== History ==
Lake Holbrook has been impounding since 1962.
