= Alba-Golden Independent School District =

School district in Texas

Location
- Hwy 69 N. Alba, Texas ESC Region 7 USA
- Coordinates: 32°45′27″N 95°35′8″W

District information
- Type: Independent school district
- Grades: Pre-K through 12
- Superintendent: Dr. Shelby Davidson
- Schools: 3 (2009-10)
- NCES District ID: 4807650

Students and staff
- Students: 885 (October 2017)
- Teachers: 74 (2009-10) (on full-time equivalent (FTE) basis)
- Student–teacher ratio: 11.8 (2009-10)
- Athletic conference: UIL Class 2A Football Division I
- District mascot: Panthers
- Colors: Red, White, Blue

Other information
- TEA District Accountability Rating for 2011-12: Recognized
- Website: Alba-Golden ISD

The Alba-Golden Independent School District is a school district serving southeastern Rains and western Wood Counties in Texas, United States. The district serves the towns of Alba and Golden. It is a AA school. Its mascot is the panther.

== Finances ==
As of the 2010–2011 school year, the appraised valuation of property in the district was $234,719,000. The maintenance tax rate was $0.104 and the bond tax rate was $0.004 per $100 of appraised valuation.

== Academic achievement ==
In 2011, the school district was rated "recognized" by the Texas Education Agency. Thirty-five percent of districts in Texas in 2011 received the same rating. No state accountability ratings will be given to districts in 2012.

Historical district TEA accountability ratings

- 2011: Recognized
- 2010: Academically acceptable
- 2009: Recognized
- 2008: Academically acceptable
- 2007: Recognized
- 2006: Recognized
- 2005: Academically acceptable
- 2004: Recognized

== Campuses ==
In the 2011–2012 school year, the district had students in three schools.

Regular instructional

- Alba-Golden High School (grades 6–12)
- Alba-Golden Elementary School (prekindergarten-grade 5)

DAEP instructional

- Alternative School (grades 7–12)

== See also ==
- List of school districts in Texas
- List of high schools in Texas
