= The Courier (Conroe newspaper) =

Daily newspaper published in Conroe, Texas

- Type: Daily newspaper
- Format: Broadsheet
- Owner(s): Hearst Communications
- Publisher: Katherine English
- Editor: Alan Fosler
- Founded: 1892
- Headquarters: 100 Avenue A, Conroe, Texas 77031 SA
- Circulation: 2,560 (as of 2023)
- Website: The Courier

The Courier is a daily newspaper published in Conroe, Texas, covering Montgomery County.

The Courier is one of roughly 25 different newspapers in the Houston Community Newspapers (HCN) group of suburban newspapers in the Greater Houston area. The HCN group was owned by ASP Westward from 2002 until 2012, when it was acquired by 1013 Star Communications. In 2016, the Hearst Corporation acquired HCN, adding The Courier and the rest of the group to its ownership of Houston's main newspaper, the Houston Chronicle.

== See also ==
- Conroe, Texas
- List of newspapers in Texas
