= Alba-Golden High School =

Location
- 1373 County Road 2377; Alba, Texas 75410-9706; United States; 32°45′33″N 95°35′9″W

Information
- School type: Public high school
- School district: Alba-Golden Independent School District
- Principal: Brittany Hall
- Staff: 36.90 (FTE)
- Grades: 6-12
- Enrollment: 433 (2024–2025)
- Student to teacher ratio: 11.73
- Colors: Red, white, and blue
- Athletics conference: UIL Class 2A
- Mascot: Panther
- Website: Alba-Golden High School

Alba-Golden High School is a public secondary school located in Alba, Texas (USA) and classified as a 2A school by the UIL. It is part of the Alba-Golden Independent School District located in west central Wood County. It is a consolidation of the nearby communities of Alba and Golden. In 2015, the school was rated "Met Standard" by the Texas Education Agency.

== Activities ==
=== Band ===
The Alba-Golden High School Prowling Panther Band is a well-known band in Wood County. The band has members in the East Texas High School All-Region Honor Band every year. They host two concerts every school year, a Christmas concert in December and a spring concert in May. During the 2011-2012 school year, the band made a division one at the regional University Interscholastic League (UIL) marching contest.

=== Drama and Theater ===
Alba-Golden hosts a number of successful theatrical productions every school year.

=== Organizations ===
Alba-Golden has several different student organizations. They range from the area of politics to the subject of agriculture.

List of Organizations

- FCA
- FFA
- FCCLA
- Gifted/Talented
- Media Tech
- National Honor Society
- Red Curtain Company
- Student Council

=== Cheerleading ===
In the 2007-2008 school year, Alba-Golden's junior high cheerleaders won nationals for AA schools.

== Athletics ==
The Alba-Golden Panthers compete in these sports -

Cross Country, Volleyball, Powerlifting, Football, Basketball, Golf, Tennis, Track, Softball & Baseball.
