= Longview News-Journal =

Newspaper in Longview, Texas

- The June 30, 2009 front page of the Longview News-Journal
- Type: Daily newspaper
- Format: Broadsheet
- Owner(s): Carpenter Media Group, LLC
- Publisher: Justin Wilcox
- Editor: Randy Ferguson (Managing)
- Founded: 1871 (155 years ago)
- Headquarters: Longview, TX 75601; United States
- Circulation: 9,512 (as of 2023)
- Website: www.news-journal.com

The Longview News-Journal is the major newspaper printed in the City of Longview, Texas.

== History ==
Dating to 1871 independent publishers, including James Hogg, later Texas governor, and Carl Estes, Longview civic figure, the publication was purchased by Cox Newspapers in the 1980s and sold by Cox to ASP Westward in 2009. It is closely affiliated with the Marshall News Messenger, another former Cox newspaper (published in nearby Marshall) which was sold to ASP Westward along with the News-Journal.

In 2012, ASP Westward announced the sale of the Longview and Marshall papers, along with 12 of its other non-daily East Texas papers, to Texas Community Media LLC, a new company formed by the longtime owners of the Victoria Advocate in South Texas.

In August 2024, the newspaper announced it will switch from carrier to postal delivery.

In December 2024, the paper's owner was acquired by Carpenter Media Group.

== Office ==
The News-Journal operates remotely.
