= Carroll Dawson =

American basketball player, coach, and general manager (1938–2024)

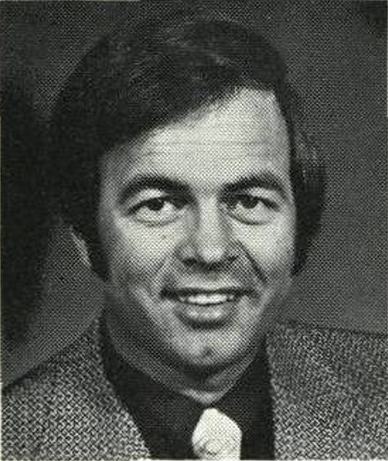
- Dawson, c. 1976

Personal information
- Born: May 3, 1938
- Died: September 9, 2024 (aged 86)

Career information
- College: Paris Junior College; Baylor
- Coaching career: 1973–1997

Career history

Coaching
- 1973–1977: Baylor
- 1980–1997: Houston Rockets (assistant)

Career highlights
- As assistant coach: 2× NBA champion (1994, 1995); As general manager: "CD" honored by Houston Rockets

Carroll Dawson (May 3, 1938 – September 9, 2024) was an American assistant coach and general manager in the National Basketball Association (NBA). He worked for the Houston Rockets franchise for 27 years before retiring in 2007.

== College career ==
A native of Alba, Texas, Dawson played collegiate basketball at Paris Junior College, where he attained the nickname, "Big Orange" and at Baylor University, during the late 1950s and early 1960s. In 1960, the 6'5" center earned All-Southwest Conference honors, after averaging 16.4 points per game for the Baylor Bears.

== Coaching and managerial career ==
After his college career, he was drafted into the Army, and stationed at Fort Knox, as a tank commander. From 1973 to 1977, he then served as Baylor's men's basketball head coach. He then worked as a scout for the NFL's Dallas Cowboys, and as a salesman for Converse shoes, before becoming an assistant coach for the Houston Rockets in 1979.

In 1989, Dawson was struck by lightning, during a golf outing, and over the next few years, his vision became progressively worse. Unable to continue his coaching duties, Dawson moved to the Rockets' front office, becoming general manager in 1996. Dawson's career with The Rockets lasted 27 years. Among his most notable accomplishments as the general manager of the Rockets, were his selection of Yao Ming in the 2002 NBA draft, and his seven-player trade to acquire NBA scoring champ Tracy McGrady, in 2004.

After announcing Daryl Morey as his successor, the Rockets honored Dawson by hanging a banner with the initials "CD" in the rafters of the Toyota Center, during a game with the Phoenix Suns.

== Head coaching record ==
Record table
Season	Team	Overall	Conference	Standing	Postseason
Baylor Bears (Southwest Conference) (1973–1977)
1973–74	Baylor	12–13	5–9	6th	
1974–75	Baylor	10–16	6–8	4th	
1975–76	Baylor	12–15	8–8	5th	
1976–77	Baylor	11–17	5–11	7th	
Baylor:		44–51	24–36		
Total:		44–51			
National champion Postseason invitational champion Conference regular season champion Conference regular season and conference tournament champion Division regular season champion Division regular season and conference tournament champion Conference tournament champion

== Death ==
Dawson died on September 9, 2024, at the age of 86.
