= Cleveland Advocate =

Newspaper in Liberty County, Texas, US

- Type: Weekly newspaper
- Format: Broadsheet
- Owner: Hearst Corporation
- Publisher: Brenda Miller-Fergerson
- Editor: Vanesa Brashier
- Founded: 1917
- Ceased publication: 2021
- Headquarters: 106 West Hanson; Cleveland, Texas; United States
- Circulation: 4,524
- ISSN: 0746-7125
- Website: www.clevelandadvocate.com

The Cleveland Advocate was a weekly newspaper in northern Liberty County, Texas, from 1917 to 2021.

== History ==
The newspaper established in 1917, nearly two decades before the City of Cleveland was incorporated.

According to an article published in the 23 November 1917 issue of the Liberty Vindicator, "The Cleveland Advocate is the new addition to the Liberty county newspaper field. The Advocate's first issue has a strong "kick" and looks like it should make good."

Published each Wednesday, the newspaper has a total circulation of 4,524 and is sold for 50 cents an issue or $24 for a yearly subscription.

Located in the heart of Cleveland, the newspaper covers news events in Cleveland, Tarkington and all of northern Liberty County.

It was owned by ASP Westward LP until 2012, when it was acquired by 1013 Star Communications as part of its acquisition of Houston Community Newspapers. In 2016, the Hearst Corporation acquired Houston Community Newspapers; it is the parent company of the Houston Chronicle. As part of the deal the Advocate became a part of the Hearst Corporation.
