= Wood County Airport (Texas) =

- IATA: none; ICAO: KJDD; FAA LID: JDD

Summary
- Airport type: Public
- Owner: Wood County
- Serves: Mineola / Quitman, Texas
- Elevation AMSL: 434 ft / 132 m
- Coordinates: 32°44′32″N 095°29′47″W
- Website: Official website

Map

Runways
Direction	Length		Surface
Direction	ft	m	Surface
18/36	4,001	1,220	Asphalt

Statistics (2008)
- Aircraft operations: 8,700
- Based aircraft: 29
- Source: Federal Aviation Administration

Wood County Airport (ICAO: KJDD, FAA LID: JDD) is a county-owned, public-use airport in Wood County, Texas, United States. It is located 5 nmi (5.8 mi; 9.3 km) north of the central business district of Mineola, Texas and 4 nmi (4.6 mi; 7.4 km) southwest of Quitman, Texas.

Although most U.S. airports use the same three-letter location identifier for the FAA and IATA, this airport is assigned JDD by the FAA but has no designation from the IATA.

== Facilities and aircraft ==
Wood County Airport covers an area of 106 acres (43 ha) at an elevation of 434 ft (132 m) above mean sea level. It has one runway designated 18/36 with an asphalt surface measuring 4,001 ft × 60 ft (1,220 m × 18 m).

For the 12-month period ending 16 September 2008, the airport had 8,700 general aviation aircraft operations, an average of 23 per day. At that time there were 29 aircraft based at this airport: 93% single-engine and 7% multi-engine.

== See also ==
- List of airports in Texas
