= Operation Gotham Shield =

2017 US FEMA civil defense exercise

- Part of the National Exercise Program
- Type: Exercise
- Date: April 23, 2017
- Executed by: Federal Emergency Management Agency

Operation Gotham Shield was a 2017 exercise conducted by the United States Federal Emergency Management Agency (FEMA) which tested civil defense response capabilities to a nuclear weapons attack against the New York City metropolitan area.

== Background ==
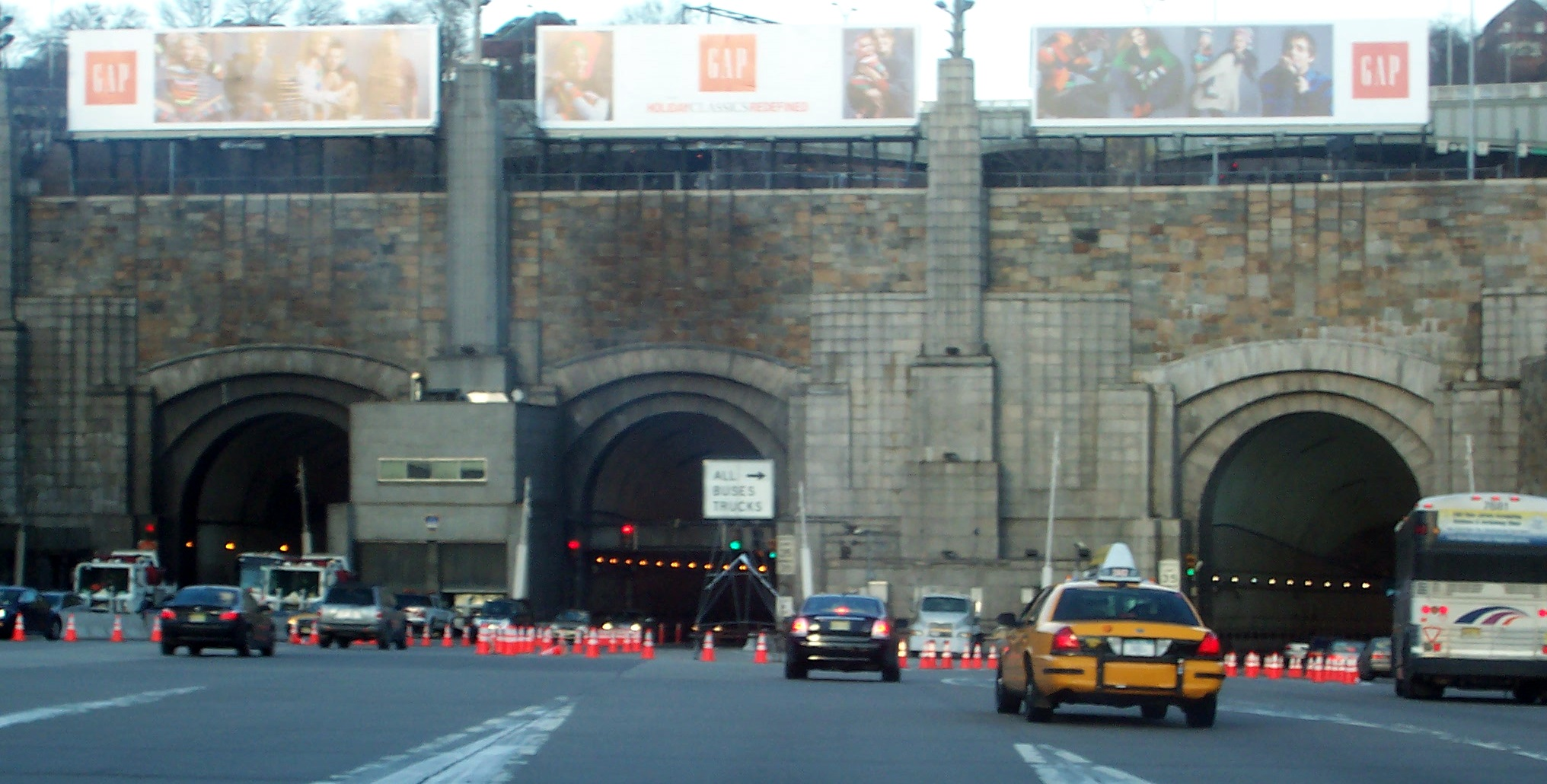
Operation Gotham Shield imagined a nuclear detonation at the New Jersey-side entrance to the Lincoln Tunnel (pictured).

Operation Gotham Shield occurred over the course of four days, from April 23 to 27, 2017, and was part of FEMA's National Exercise Program.

The operation involved the hypothetical ground burst of a nuclear device at the New Jersey-side entrance to the Lincoln Tunnel, resulting in "hundreds of thousands" of killed and injured persons and 4.5 million refugees from the initial blast and subsequent fallout.

Due to the location of the simulated attack, the operation scenario assumed the disablement or destruction of FEMA's Region II Regional Response Coordination Center (Note: FEMA's Region II is responsible for New York, New Jersey, Puerto Rico, the Virgin Islands of the United States, and eight tribal nations.) which required transfer of command functions to the Region V Regional Response Coordination Center. (Note: FEMA's Region V is normally responsible for Illinois, Indiana, Michigan, Minnesota, Ohio, and Wisconsin.) In the final phases of the exercise, a hypothetical "massive influx" of refugees from the attack "overwhelmed" the resources of neighboring states.

== Participating agencies ==
In addition to FEMA, other agencies and organizations which participated in the exercise included the Morris County Office of Emergency Management, the New Jersey National Guard, the Military Auxiliary Radio System, the Metro Urban Search and Rescue Strike Team, the U.S. Army Corps of Engineers, the FBI, the New Jersey State Police, various municipal departments of the City of New York, and others.

== Other activities ==
Gotham Shield occurred simultaneous with several partnered exercises testing the responsiveness of different agencies of the United States in the fulfillment of their own organizational priorities as they would apply to the core attack scenario, including Vibrant Response (led by United States Army North), Prominent Hunt 17-1 (led by the Domestic Nuclear Detection Office), and Fuerzas Amigas (a joint planning event of the Mexican Armed Forces and United States Armed Forces).

Ardent Sentry 17 (led by the Northern Command), was another simultaneous operation which focused on military aid to the civil power, specifically "marshalling simulated forces". It was a command post exercise with staff operating from a primary command post at the 42nd Infantry Division headquarters in Troy, and a redundancy command post at the New York National Guard Joint Force Headquarters in Latham. It was overseen by General Timothy LaBarge of the New York National Guard who was given "dual status command", or authority to command both State of New York and United States military forces.

Meanwhile, Canada conducted an overlapping exercise, Staunch Maple 17, whose scenario involved simultaneous "nuclear threats" in Ottawa and Halifax. It also involved the friendly intervention of U.S. military forces into eastern Canada. Unlike Gotham Shield, Canada's Department of National Defence did not publicly describe the scenario around which Staunch Maple 17 was based, but media outlets would later cite sources who confirmed it involved a "nuclear event" and was a test of scaled contingency plans the country had involving "a wide range of scenarios involving attacks on Canada, including a missile attack."

== Conspiracy theories ==
Operation Gotham Shield was billed as a "false flag" by some conspiracy theorists, who predicted it was designed to cover up a planned, actual nuclear weapons attack against the New York metropolitan area, or as distraction from a planned U.S. nuclear weapons attack against North Korea. The British tabloid Daily Express, meanwhile, propagated a different take on the conspiracy theory which hypothesized that "a major incident will happen to US President Donald Trump on Wednesday" (the date of the first day of Gotham Shield).

== See also ==
- Joint Task Force Empire Shield
