= Mineola, Texas =

- City
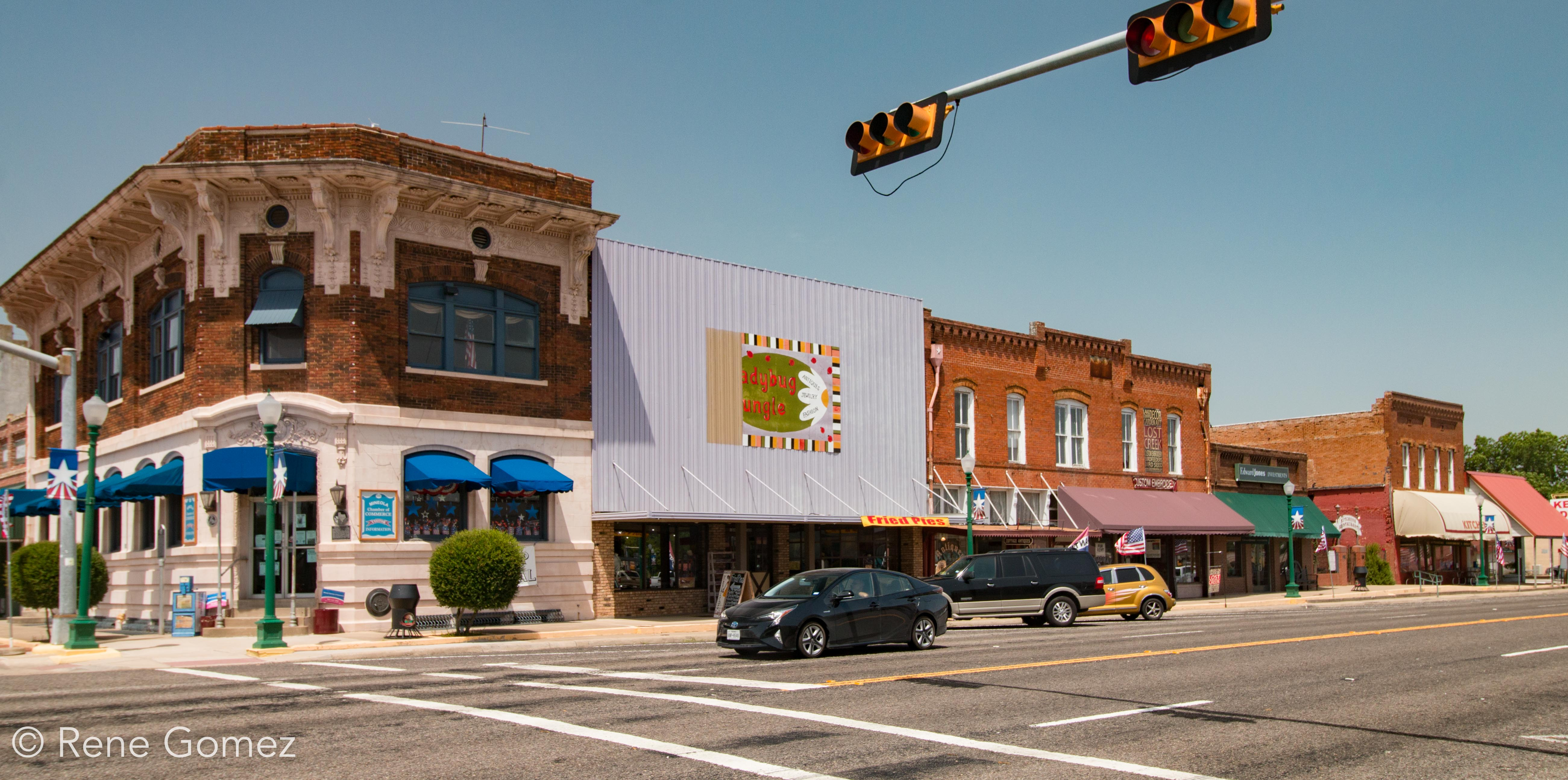
- Downtown Mineola

- Seal

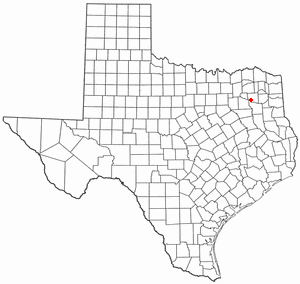
- Location of Mineola, Texas

- Coordinates: 32°38′47″N 95°28′38″W
- Country: United States
- State: Texas
- County: Wood
- Incorporated (city): 1877

Area
  - Total: 10.45 sq mi (27.07 km^{2})
  - Land: 10.27 sq mi (26.61 km^{2})
  - Water: 0.18 sq mi (0.46 km^{2})
- Elevation: 338 ft (103 m)

Population (2020)
  - Total: 4,823
  - Density: 463.84/sq mi (179.09/km^{2})
- Time zone: UTC−6 (Central (CST))
  - Summer (DST): UTC−5 (CDT)
- ZIP Code: 75773
- Area codes: 430, 903
- FIPS code: 48-48648
- GNIS feature ID: 2411118
- Website: www.Mineola.com

Mineola is a city in the U.S. state of Texas in Wood County. It lies 26 miles north of Tyler. Its population was 4,823 at the 2020 census.

The town was incorporated as the railroads arrived in 1873. A railroad official, Ira H. Evans, combined the names of his daughter, Ola, and her friend, Minnie Patten, to create the city name Mineola.

== History ==
Mineola came into existence when the railroads built lines through the eastern part of the state. In 1873, the Texas and Pacific and the International-Great Northern raced to see which could get to Mineola first. The I-GN reached the finish 15 minutes earlier. A city government was organized in 1873, a post office opened in 1875, and the town was incorporated in 1877, but a fire in the 1880s destroyed 18 buildings. The town's oldest paper, the Mineola Monitor, was founded in 1876. By 1890, the town had seven churches, several schools including a black free school, hotels, banks. In 1895, Mineola became the site of the Wood County Fair.

Since Mineola was in the heart of the East Texas timber belt, timber was plentiful for making railroad ties and lumber. Mineola provided most of the ties to complete the T&P RR west to El Paso in 1879; S. Zuckerman, a Mineola resident, filled contracts for 85,000 ties that were used in the construction. During the community's first 60 years, farm products included cotton, livestock, fruit, and berries. A chair factory opened in 1886, became a crate and basket factory in 1900, and operated until 1952. Highway improvement, the Magnolia Pipeline Company gas line, and the establishment of a railroad terminal caused growth during the 1920s, and the discovery of oil in parts of Wood County and construction of a T&P railroad shop spurred the economy during the 1940s. Diversified farming gave way to cattle raising and watermelon crops by 1950. The Mineola Watermelon Festival began in 1948. Subsequently, sweet-potato farming, a creamery, a nursery, and a company that supplies poles and pulpwood to the telephone company helped the economy.

The town remains a shipping center. The Mineola Memorial Library, largely financed by H. W. Meredith, was completed in 1960. Nearby Lake Holbrook, also completed in 1962, attracts residents and visitors. The Meredith Foundation has provided large sums for educational and cultural purposes since 1962. Meredith Hall Civic Center, completed in 1977, is used by large and small groups for varied events. The manufacture of women's clothing, sporting goods, electronic connectors, fertilizer, and cattle feed, and the packaging of dry beans and meat provide employment for many people. The Wood County Airport, 5 nautical miles (9.3 km; 5.8 mi) north of Mineola, was completed in 1984. A new city hall complex was completed in 1986, and a two-school facility was completed in 1987.

In 2023, Max aired How to Create a Sex Scandal, a three-part documentary about charges of child sexual abuse that allegedly took place in Mineola in 2005.

== Geography ==
According to the United States Census Bureau, the city has a total area of 10.339 sq mi (26.78 km^{2}), of which 10.161 sq mi (26.32 km^{2}) are land and 0.178 sq mi (0.46 km^{2}) is covered by water.

=== Climate ===
Mineola enjoys weather typical of East Texas, which is unpredictable, especially in the spring. Mineola's humid subtropical climate is typical of the Southeast United States.

Climate data for Mineola, Texas (1991–2020)
Month	Jan	Feb	Mar	Apr	May	Jun	Jul	Aug	Sep	Oct	Nov	Dec	Year
Mean daily maximum °F (°C)	56.9 (13.8)	60.5 (15.8)	68.3 (20.2)	75.4 (24.1)	81.9 (27.7)	89.1 (31.7)	92.6 (33.7)	94.1 (34.5)	87.6 (30.9)	77.8 (25.4)	66.9 (19.4)	58.7 (14.8)	75.8 (24.3)
Daily mean °F (°C)	44.8 (7.1)	49.3 (9.6)	56.2 (13.4)	63.2 (17.3)	71.4 (21.9)	78.9 (26.1)	81.9 (27.7)	82.4 (28.0)	75.3 (24.1)	65.0 (18.3)	54.7 (12.6)	47.0 (8.3)	64.2 (17.9)
Mean daily minimum °F (°C)	32.7 (0.4)	38.1 (3.4)	44.1 (6.7)	50.9 (10.5)	60.8 (16.0)	68.7 (20.4)	71.2 (21.8)	70.7 (21.5)	63.1 (17.3)	52.2 (11.2)	42.5 (5.8)	35.3 (1.8)	52.5 (11.4)
Average precipitation inches (mm)	3.67 (93)	4.01 (102)	4.15 (105)	3.80 (97)	4.68 (119)	3.53 (90)	2.67 (68)	2.71 (69)	3.73 (95)	4.99 (127)	3.47 (88)	5.06 (129)	46.47 (1,182)
Average snowfall inches (cm)	0.2 (0.51)	0.3 (0.76)	0.1 (0.25)	0.0 (0.0)	0.0 (0.0)	0.0 (0.0)	0.0 (0.0)	0.0 (0.0)	0.0 (0.0)	0.0 (0.0)	0.0 (0.0)	0.1 (0.25)	0.7 (1.77)
Source: NOAA

== Demographics ==
Historical population
Census	Pop.	Note	%±
1880	1,175		—
1890	1,333		13.4%
1900	1,725		29.4%
1910	1,706		−1.1%
1920	2,299		34.8%
1930	3,304		43.7%
1940	3,223		−2.5%
1950	3,626		12.5%
1960	3,810		5.1%
1970	3,926		3.0%
1980	4,346		10.7%
1990	4,321		−0.6%
2000	4,550		5.3%
2010	4,515		−0.8%
2020	4,823		6.8%
U.S. Decennial Census

As of the 2020 census, Mineola had a population of 4,823.

=== 2020 census ===
The population density was 463.84 inhabitants per square mile (179.09/km^{2}). The median age was 41.9 years; 22.6% of residents were under the age of 18 and 24.5% were 65 years of age or older. For every 100 females there were 87.2 males, and for every 100 females age 18 and over there were 84.0 males.

There were 1,877 households in Mineola, of which 30.5% had children under the age of 18 living in them. Of all households, 41.7% were married-couple households, 18.6% were households with a male householder and no spouse or partner present, and 34.0% were households with a female householder and no spouse or partner present. About 31.9% of all households were made up of individuals and 19.5% had someone living alone who was 65 years of age or older.

There were 2,086 housing units, of which 10.0% were vacant. The homeowner vacancy rate was 2.2% and the rental vacancy rate was 7.5%.

Ninety-five point seven percent of residents lived in urban areas, while 4.3% lived in rural areas.

Racial composition as of the 2020 census
Race	Number	Percent
White	3,227	66.9%
Black or African American	465	9.6%
American Indian and Alaska Native	39	0.8%
Asian	31	0.6%
Native Hawaiian and Other Pacific Islander	0	0.0%
Some other race	470	9.7%
Two or more races	591	12.3%
Hispanic or Latino (of any race)	1,092	22.6%

The median income for a household in the city was $30,000, and for a family was $37,528. Males had a median income of $29,938 versus $20,750 for females. The per capita income for the city was $15,945. About 16.2% of families and 18.6% of the population were below the poverty line, including 24.3% of those under age 18 and 11.2% of those age 65 or over.

== Religion ==
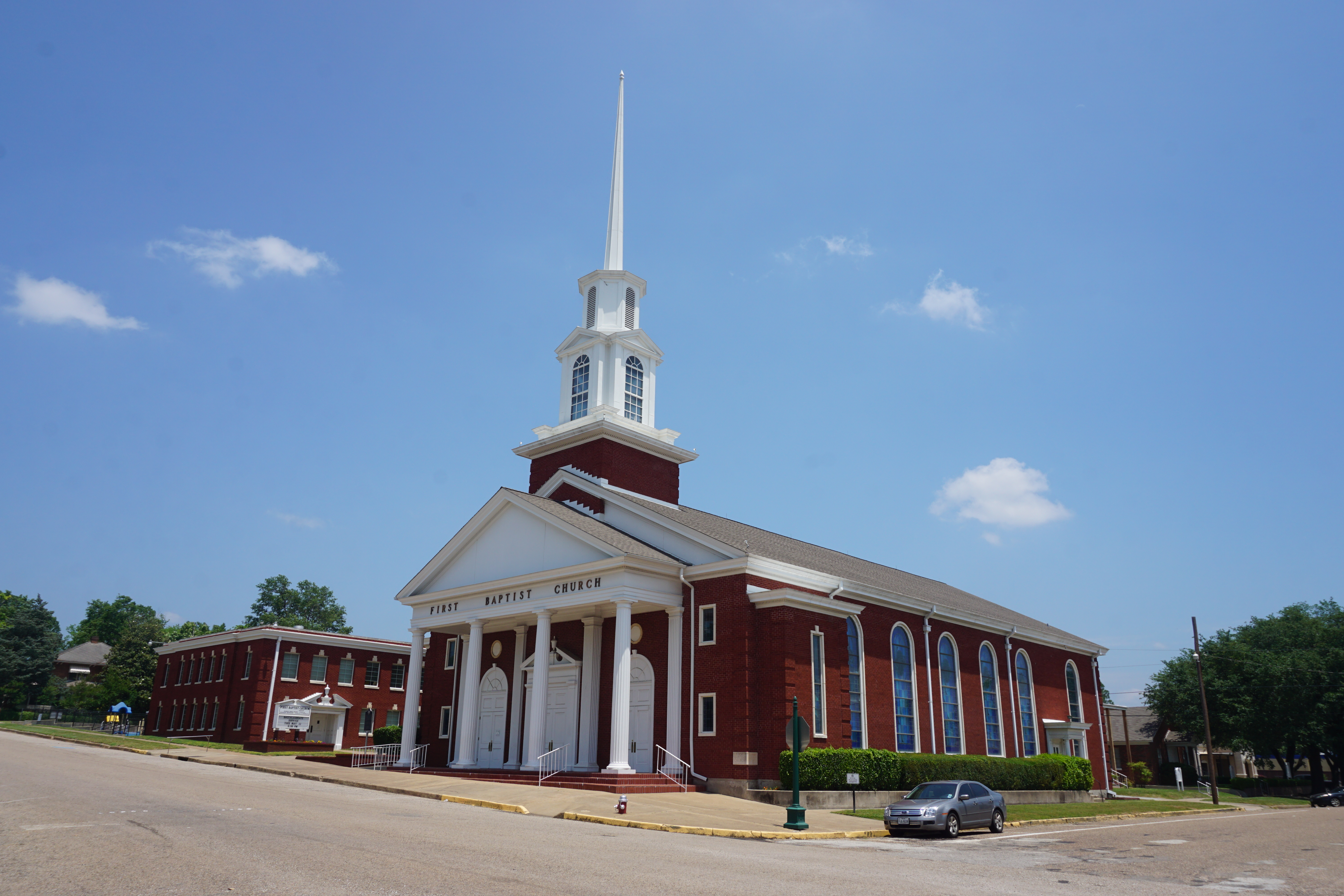
First Baptist Church

- First Baptist Mineola is one of the largest churches in the Wood County area, with enrollment record around 850.
- Sand Springs Baptist Church is located just west of Mineola. The church has a regular Sunday attendance around 350.
- Broad Street Church of Christ
- Mineola First United Methodist Church
- New Hope Baptist Church
- St. Paul Missionary Baptist Church, founded October 1871, in Mineola
- Johnson Chapel United Methodist Church
- Sidney Temple Church of God
- East Chapel Christian Methodist Episcopal Church
- St. Peter the Apostle Roman Catholic Church is a parish of the Roman Catholic Diocese of Tyler.

== Sports ==
The Mineola Black Spiders were a non-league barnstorming African-American baseball team. In 2010, the Texas Historical Commission erected a historical marker at the corner of Hwy. 69 S and South Johnson Street.

== Parks and recreation ==
The Mineola Nature Preserve

Largest city-owned park per capita in the United States at 2,911 acres. "The Birding Capital of East Texas" established in 2005.

Howard L. and Vivian W. Lott House

The Howard L. and Vivian W. Lott House is a house designed in the Prairie School style with classical details. It is a Recorded Texas Historic Landmark and is listed on the National Register of Historic Places.

Iron Horse Square

Iron Horse Square is a five-acre area in downtown Mineola that celebrates the railroad heritage of the city, county and East Texas area. Situated between Front and Commerce Streets and alongside the Union Pacific Railroad tracks the park is a joint effort between the Mineola Landmark Commission, the Parks & Open Spaces Board and the City of Mineola. It hosts a mini train, railroad-themed playground, and historical walking trail.

Mineola Downtown Historic District

Mineola Downtown Historic District is home to a collection of buildings that were constructed between 1885 and 1960. The district comprises 88 properties and covers almost 23 acres (9.3 ha).

It was added to the National Register of Historic Places on April 16, 2013.

Lakes

- Lake Holbrook – located four miles west.
- Lake Fork – located 20 miles north, between the towns of Quitman, Alba, Emory, and Yantis, Texas.

== Education ==
The City of Mineola is served by the Mineola Independent School District.

- Mineola High School

Historically Black schools

- Mineola Colored High School
- McFarland Elementary

== Media ==
Newspaper

The Wood County Monitor is a weekly newspaper serving Mineola and Wood County, Texas. In August 2016, newspaper operations of the Mineola Monitor and the Wood County Democrat were merged by their owner, Bluebonnet Publishing, to form the Wood County Monitor.

Radio

KMOO-FM (99.9 MHz FM, "K-Moo") is a radio station broadcasting a country music format. Licensed to Mineola, Texas, United States, the station serves the Tyler-Longview area. The station is currently owned by Hightower Radio, Inc. Studios and transmitter are located in Mineola.

== Infrastructure ==
=== Transportation ===
==== Roads ====
Mineola includes the intersection of two major U.S. highways; US 69 and US 80 intersect in the downtown area. Texas Highway 37 connects Mineola and Quitman off US 69.

Major highways

- U.S. Highway 69
- U.S. Highway 80

Farm to market roads

- FM 49

State highways

- Texas State Highway 37
- Loop 564 State Highway Loop 564 (large sections are outside city limits)

==== Railroads ====
Mineola is currently served by Amtrak's Texas Eagle passenger railway line. The railroad tracks which run through the southern portion of Wood County and through Mineola are currently owned and operated by Union Pacific.

==== Airports ====
Mineola is served by two airports:

- Mineola Wisner Field is identified as 3F9. This airport was established in 1917, and has been operated by the same family owners since 1926.
- Wood County Airport (Mineola/Quitman Airport) is a public airport owned by Wood County.

== Gallery ==
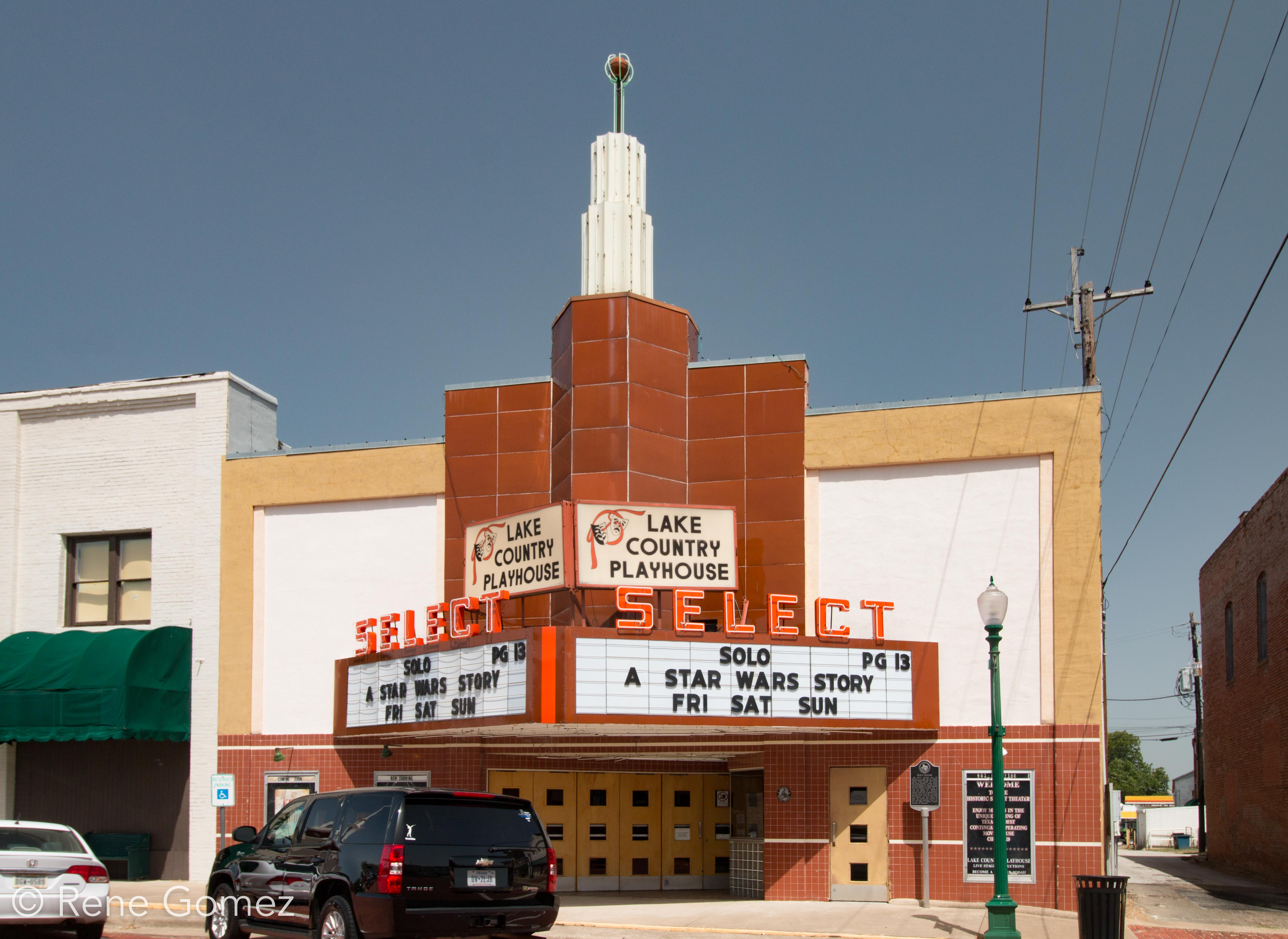
Select Theater

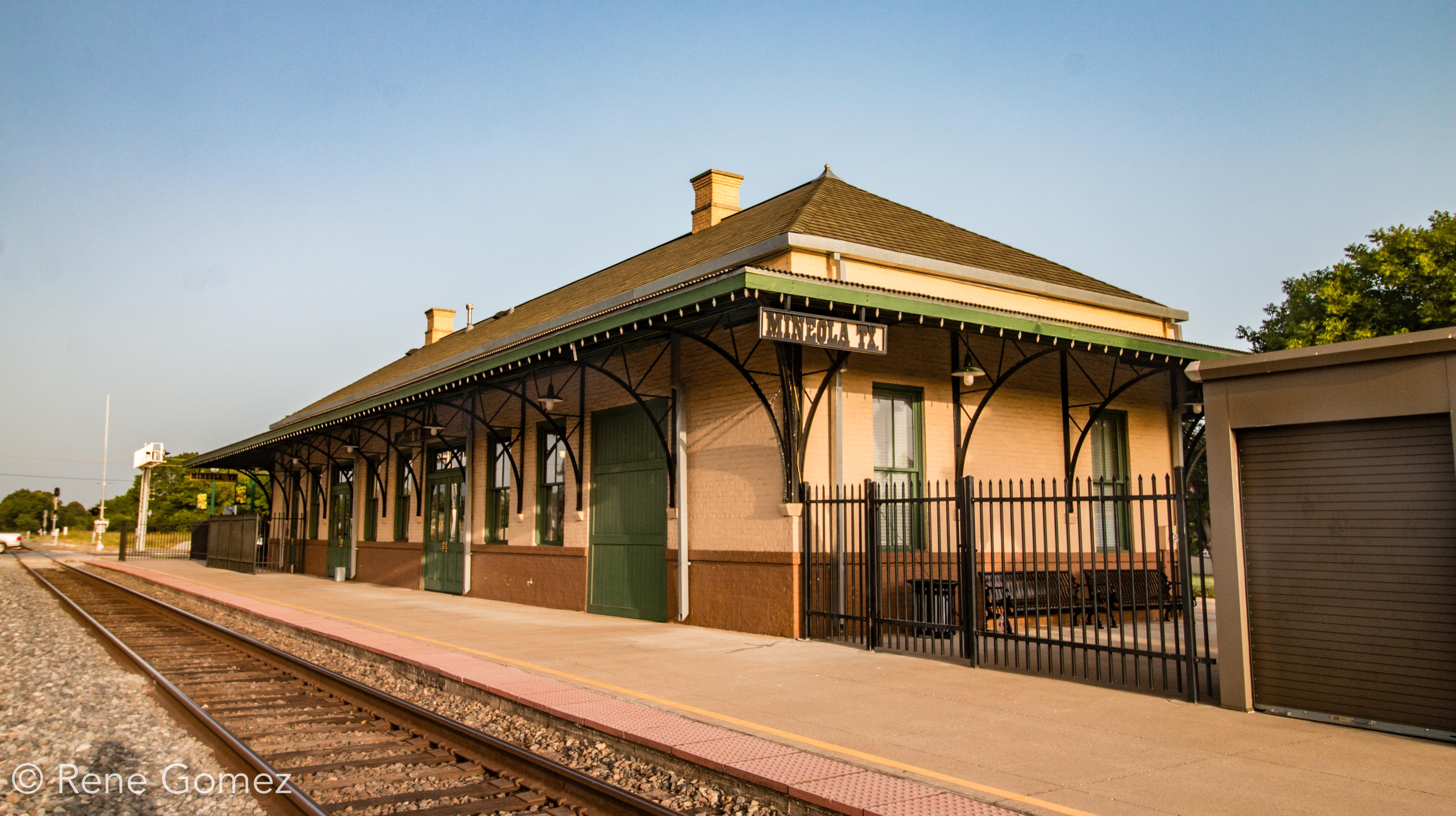
Amtrak Train Station

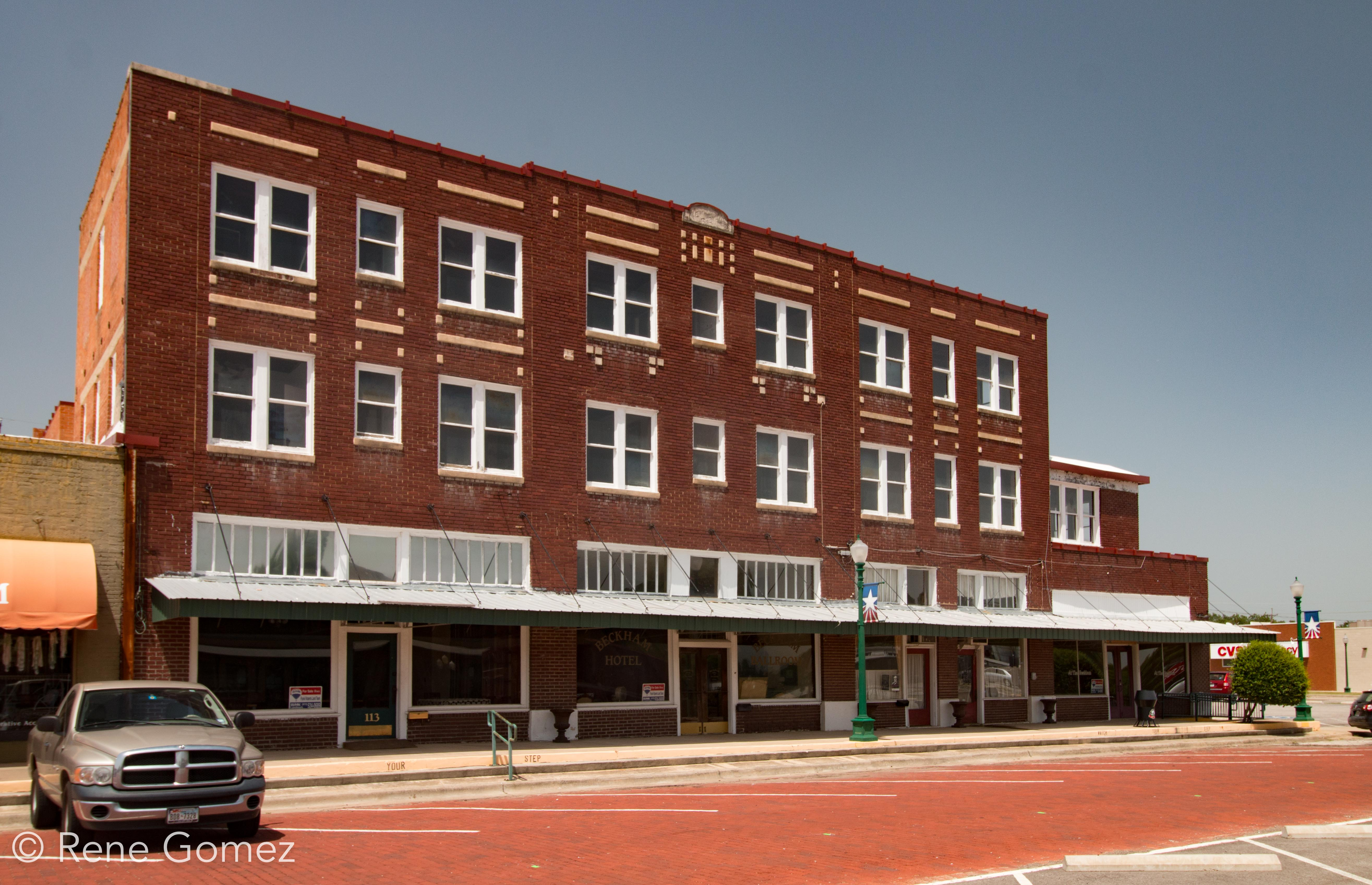
Beckham Hotel

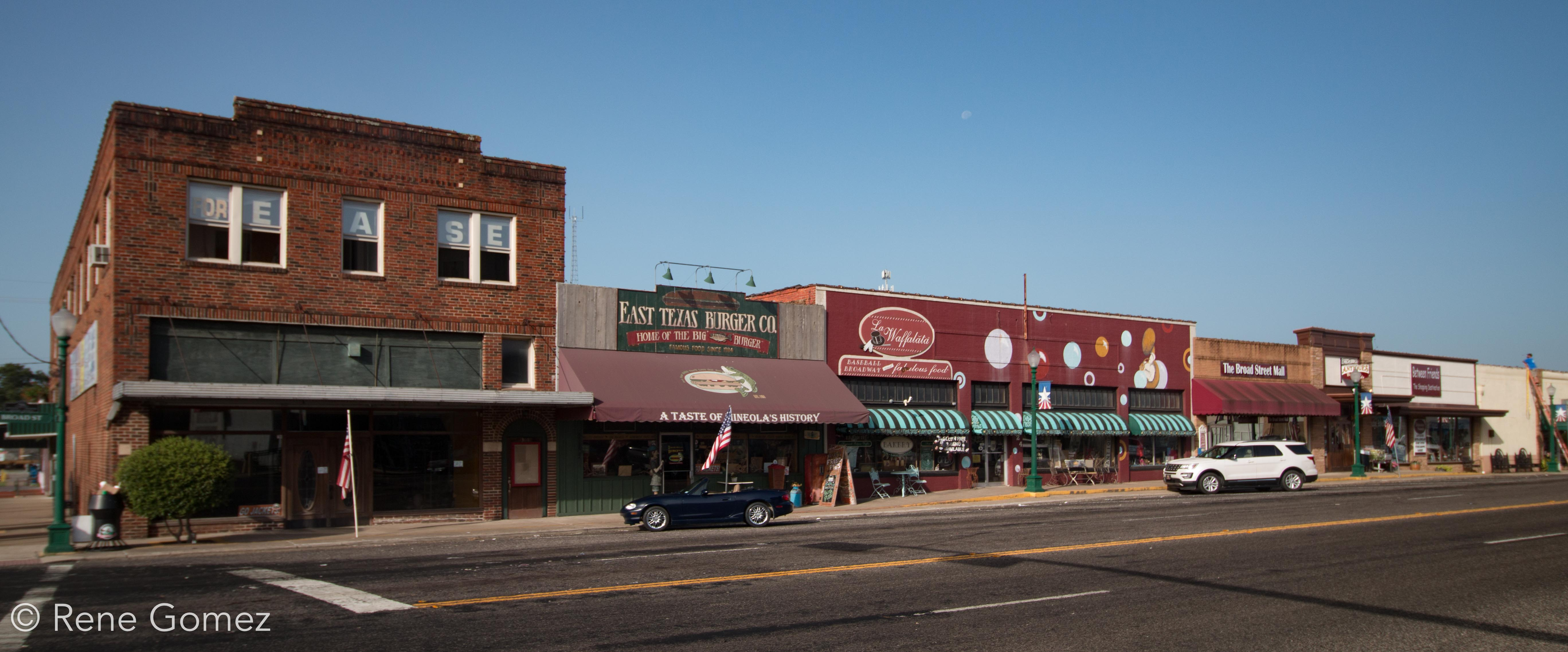
Downtown

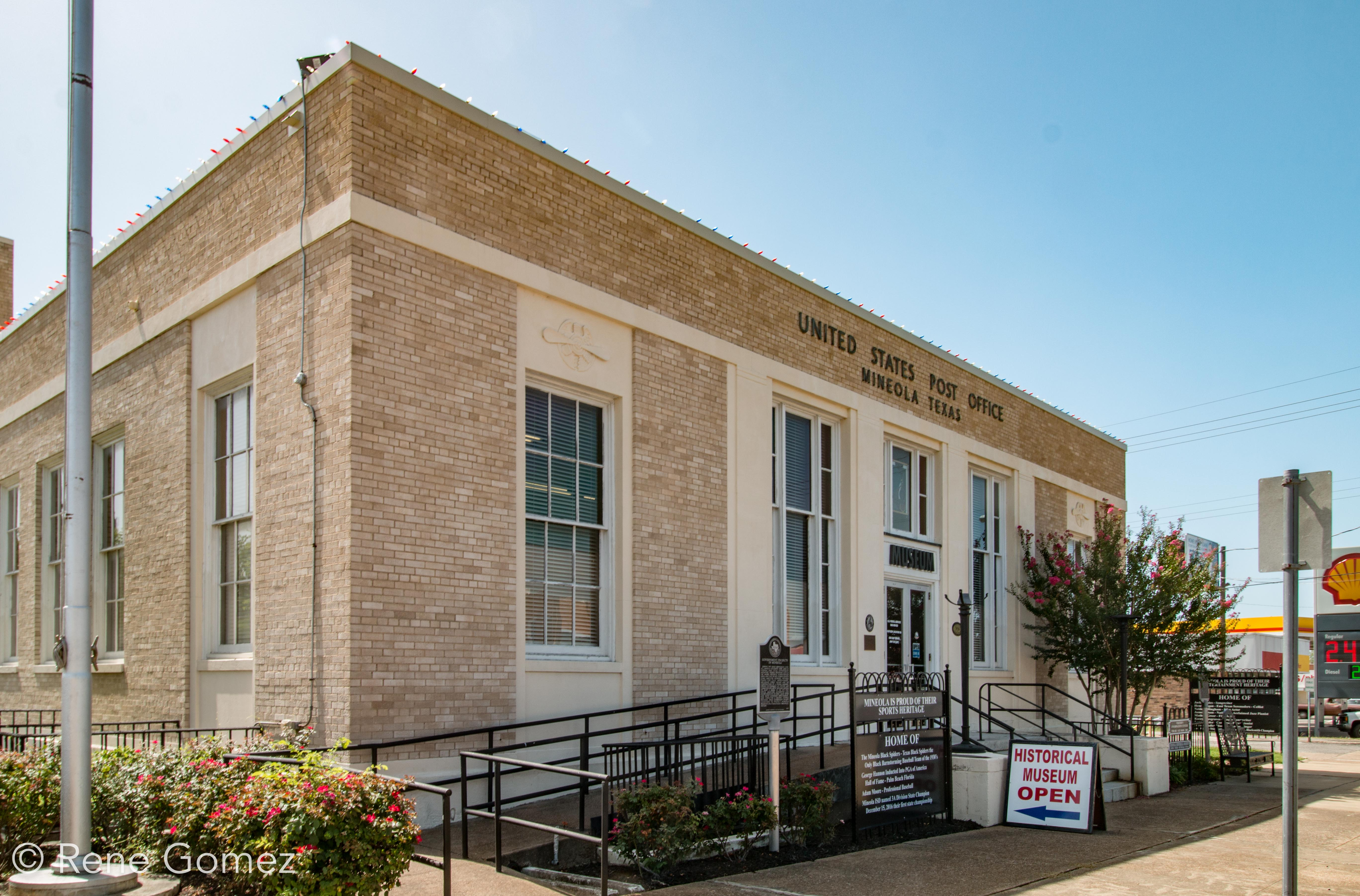
United States Post Office, now a museum

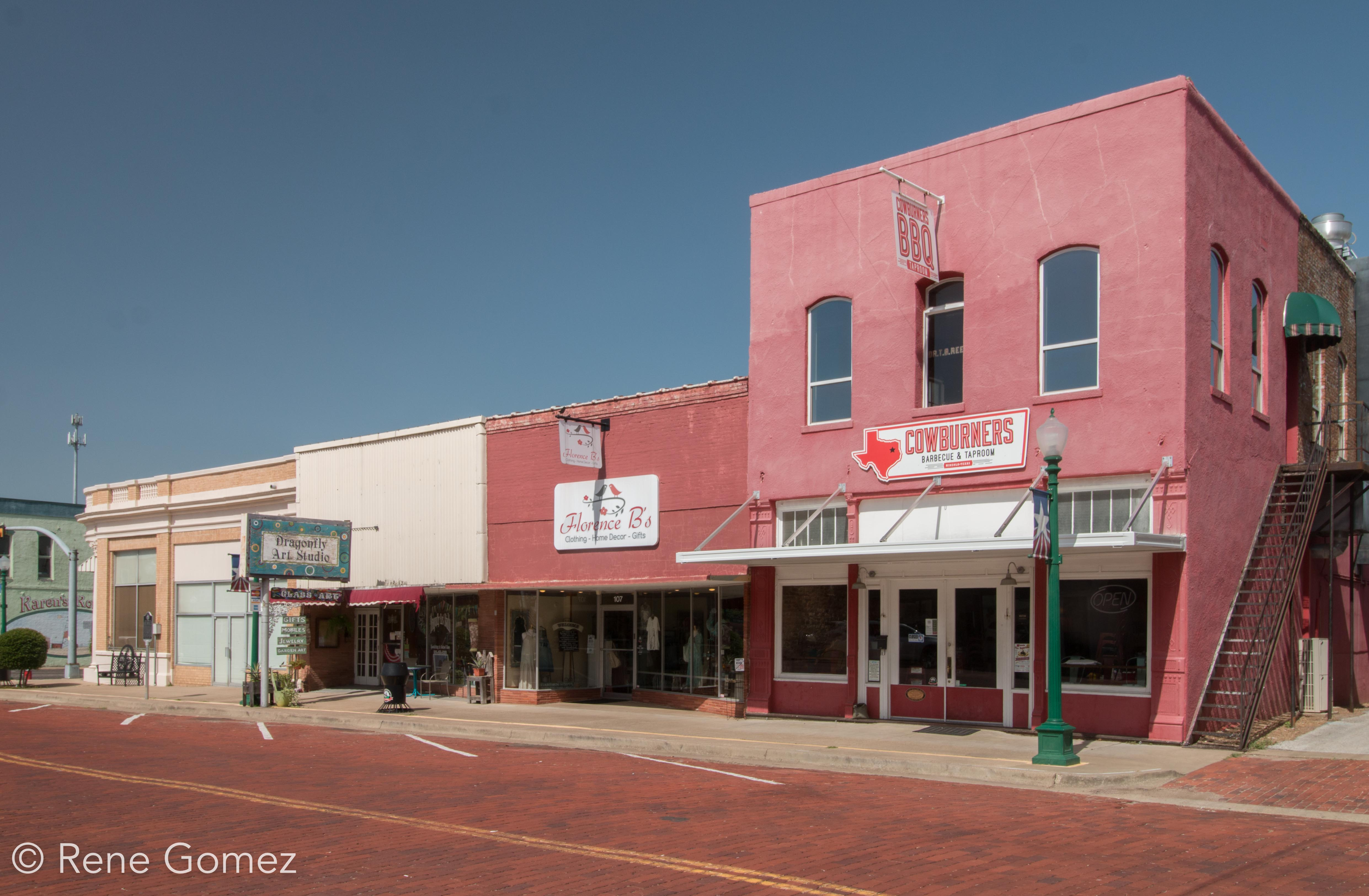
Downtown

== Notable people ==
- Willie Brown, former mayor of San Francisco attended Mineola Colored High School
- R.C. Hickman, a civil rights photographer during the 1950s
- Jim Hogg, Texas governor lived in Mineola and his daughter Ima Hogg was born in a house in this city.
- Bryan Hughes, member of the Texas House of Representatives and member of the Texas State Senate
- Bobby Ray Inman, former deputy director of the CIA and nominee for secretary of defense of the United States
- Adam Moore, professional baseball player
- Kacey Musgraves, Grammy-winning country music artist and performer
- Jack Rhodes, influential country music songwriter and inductee in the Nashville Songwriters Hall of Fame
- Noble Willingham, actor known for The Last Picture Show and Walker, Texas Ranger
