= Grand Saline Sun =

- Type: Weekly newspaper
- Publisher: Bert Rex Fite
- Editor: Bert Rex Fite
- Founded: 1894
- Circulation: 350 (as of 2023)
- Website: grandsalinesun.com

The Grand Saline Sun is a weekly newspaper published in Grand Saline, Texas in Van Zandt County. The paper is published on Thursday and is printed in Center, Texas.

== History ==
Founded in 1894, the paper consolidated with at least two other papers in the early 1900s. One of the other papers was named the Grand Saline Salt Shaker and was most likely the source of the graphic of a salt shaker which appears on the current masthead (the town's name comes from a large salt deposit located southeast of the city, mined by Morton Salt).

In 1945, Byron B. Buzbee, former agricultural editor of the Corpus Christi Caller-Times purchased the ownership share of James B. Dudley, becoming co-publisher with Alf Roberson. A year later, Buzbee bought out Roberson's share. On Dec. 30, 1949, Buzbee announced the sale of the paper to S. Neil Harle, a graduate of the University of Missouri journalism school and former news editor and advertising manager of The Port Neches Chronicle. Harle sold the paper to Roberson in 1959.

In September 2009, the paper's website was launched.

In November 2012, the Sun was purchased by Lake Country Media, LLC, a family owned media company located in Grand Saline and is now locally owned and operated by Dan and Ann Moore.

In April 2015, Lewis County Press, LLC purchased the paper from Dan Moore, who arranged for Bert R. Fite, a Grand Saline resident, to be publisher under the new owners. Bert Fite was the sports reporter while Dan Moore owned it.

On October 1, 2018, Bert R. Fite and Michelle Fite became owners of the Grand Saline Sun. Its office, which used to be located at 116 N. Main Street, was moved to 123 West Frank St. on April 15, 2018.
