= The Marshall News Messenger =

The Marshall News-Messenger
- The 2009-06-30 cover of The Marshall News-Messenger.
- Type: Daily newspaper
- Format: Broadsheet
- Owner: Carpenter Media Group
- Publisher: Justin Wilcox
- Editor: Randy Ferguson
- Founded: 1877
- Headquarters: 100 N. Bolivar St. Marshall, TX 75670; United States
- Circulation: 2,837 (as of 2023)
- Website: MarshallNewsMessenger.com

The Marshall News Messenger (originally the Marshall Morning News) is a daily newspaper based in Marshall, Texas.

== History ==
There have been three newspapers based in Marshall, Texas: the Texas Republican (1849–1872), the Tri-Weekly Herald (1874), and the current Marshall News Messenger (originally the Marshall Morning News).

The Marshall Morning News was founded in 1919, with the first issue appearing September 7. It was founded by Homer Price and Bryan Blalock.

Cox Enterprises sold the newspaper to ASP Westward in 2009. In 2012, ASP announced the sale of the Marshall and Longview papers, along with 12 of its other non-daily East Texas papers, to Texas Community Media LLC, a new company formed by the longtime owners of the Victoria Advocate in South Texas.

In August 2024, the newspaper announced it will switch from carrier to postal delivery.

In December 2024, the paper's owner was acquired by Carpenter Media Group.
