= Alba, Texas =

- Town
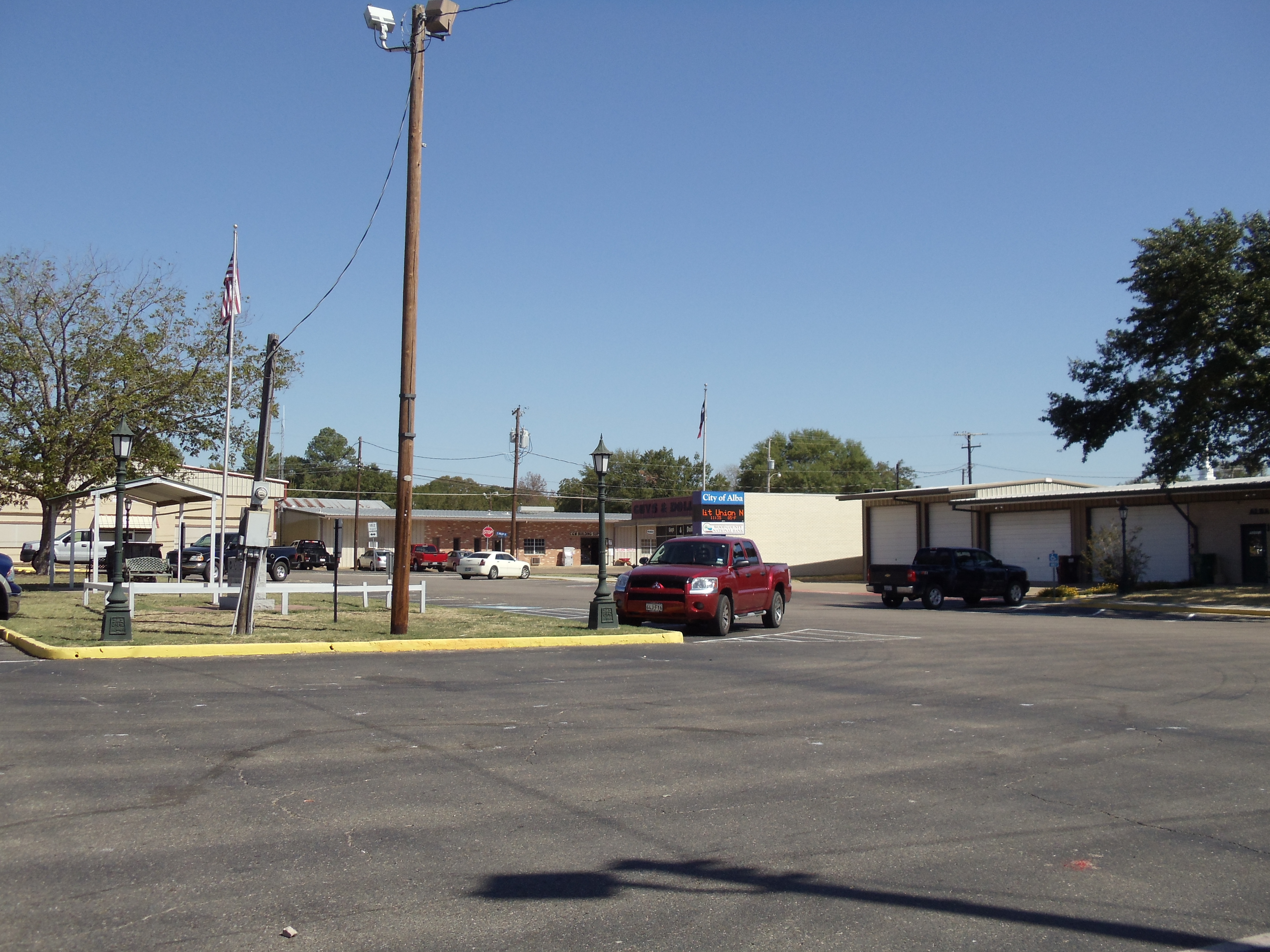
- Interactive map of Alba, Texas
- Coordinates: 32°47′31″N 95°37′54″W
- Country: United States
- State: Texas
- Counties: Wood, Rains

Area
  - Total: 1.06 sq mi (2.74 km^{2})
  - Land: 1.05 sq mi (2.73 km^{2})
  - Water: 0.0077 sq mi (0.02 km^{2})
- Elevation: 449 ft (137 m)

Population (2020)
  - Total: 473
  - Density: 517.7/sq mi (199.87/km^{2})
- Time zone: UTC-6 (Central (CST))
  - Summer (DST): UTC-5 (CDT)
- ZIP code: 75410
- Area codes: 430, 903
- FIPS code: 48-01636
- GNIS feature ID: 2412341
- Website: www.albatexas.org

Alba (/ˈælbə/ AL-bə) is a town located at the intersection of U.S. Highway 69 and Farm To Market Road 17 on the western edge of Wood County, Texas, United States, south of Lake Fork and approximately ten miles west of Quitman. The population was 473 in the 2020 U.S. Census.

== History ==
A gunsmith named Joseph Simpkins was likely the first to settle the area, arriving here with his family from Missouri around 1843. The area was previously alternately known as Albia and Simpkins' Prairie. Theories on how the community got its name differ; one claims it was because the town had been intended for white settlers only while another claims it was named for the son of a railroad official.

The Alba Oilfield was discovered just south of Alba in 1848 by F.R. Jackson.

The Missouri, Kansas and Texas Railroad came through Alba in 1881. One of the earliest shipments to Alba is reported to have been a telegraph office and, reportedly one of the first telegraphs received told details of the assassination of President James Garfield. Later that year, Alba also received a post office. It closed briefly in 1882 but reopened that same year.

By 1882, a townsite had been laid out and a number of merchants were opened in the area to serve the influx of railroad-tie cutters; population was 50 by 1884 and 300 by 1896.

A lignite coal deposit was discovered near Alba around 1900 and in 1902 and 1903, the Texas Short Line Railway was constructed to ship coal from Alba and nearby Hoyt to Grand Saline in Van Zandt County. By 1911, five area mines produced about 40,000 tons of coal per month. Population was around 1,500 by this year. Unlike other coal mines in the state, those at Alba were forced to use convict labor, because Alba was a sundown town that banned African Americans and Hispanics from living or working there.

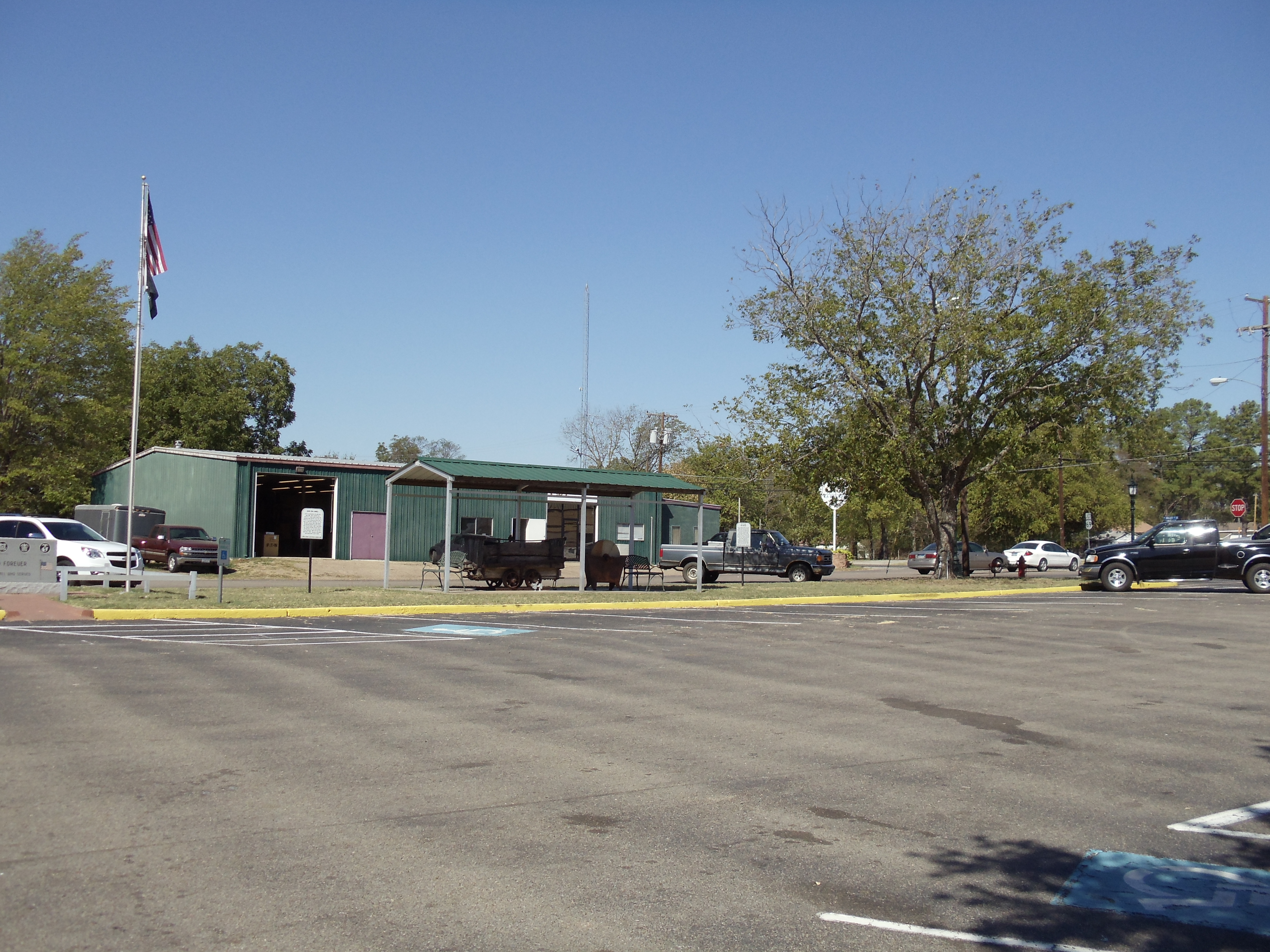
Alba Town Square

By 1990, the boundaries of Alba had expanded in to nearby Rains County, and the city had a population of 489, which dropped to 430 in 2000.

In 2008, the town received national attention following the Caffey family murders.

== Geography ==
According to the United States Census Bureau, the town has a total area of 1.1 square miles (2.9 km^{2}), all land.

It is approximately 60 miles (97 km) northeast of Dallas.

== Demographics ==
Historical population
Census	Pop.	Note	%±
1920	1,352		—
1930	662		−51.0%
1940	675		2.0%
1950	547		−19.0%
1960	472		−13.7%
1970	555		17.6%
1980	568		2.3%
1990	489		−13.9%
2000	430		−12.1%
2010	504		17.2%
2020	473		−6.2%
U.S. Decennial Census

As of the census of 2000, there were 430 people, 196 households, and 118 families residing in the town. The population density was 387.8 inhabitants per square mile (149.7/km^{2}). There were 232 housing units at an average density of 209.2 units per square mile (80.8 units/km^{2}). The racial makeup of the town was 98.60% White, 0.47% African American, 0.47% Native American, and 0.47% from two or more races. Hispanic or Latino of any race were 1.16% of the population.

There were 196 households, out of which 23.5% had children under the age of 18 living with them, 46.9% were married couples living together, 11.7% had a female householder with no husband present, and 39.3% were non-families. 35.7% of all households were made up of individuals, and 20.4% had someone living alone who was 65 years of age or older. The average household size was 2.19 and the average family size was 2.85.

In the town, the population was spread out, with 24.2% under the age of 18, 8.1% from 18 to 24, 19.8% from 25 to 44, 25.6% from 45 to 64, and 22.3% who were 65 years of age or older. The median age was 42 years. For every 100 females, there were 84.5 males. For every 100 females age 18 and over, there were 76.2 males.

The median income for a household in the town was $23,438, and the median income for a family was $29,464. Males had a median income of $28,125 versus $25,278 for females. The per capita income for the town was $13,675. About 11.4% of families and 16.1% of the population were below the poverty line, including 19.4% of those under age 18 and 16.3% of those age 65 or over.

== Education ==
Alba is served by the Alba-Golden Independent School District and home to the Alba-Golden High School Panthers.

== Media ==
During its history, Alba has had two newspapers: the Alba Herald and the Alba Reporter.

Alba is brought up as the hometown of Margo in the Netflix show "The Hunting Wives."

== Notable people ==
- Carroll Dawson, assistant coach and general manager in the National Basketball Association
- Leon Payne, "the Blind Balladeer", was a country music singer and songwriter

== See also ==
- List of sundown towns in the United States
