= Cleburne, Texas =

Cleburne
- City
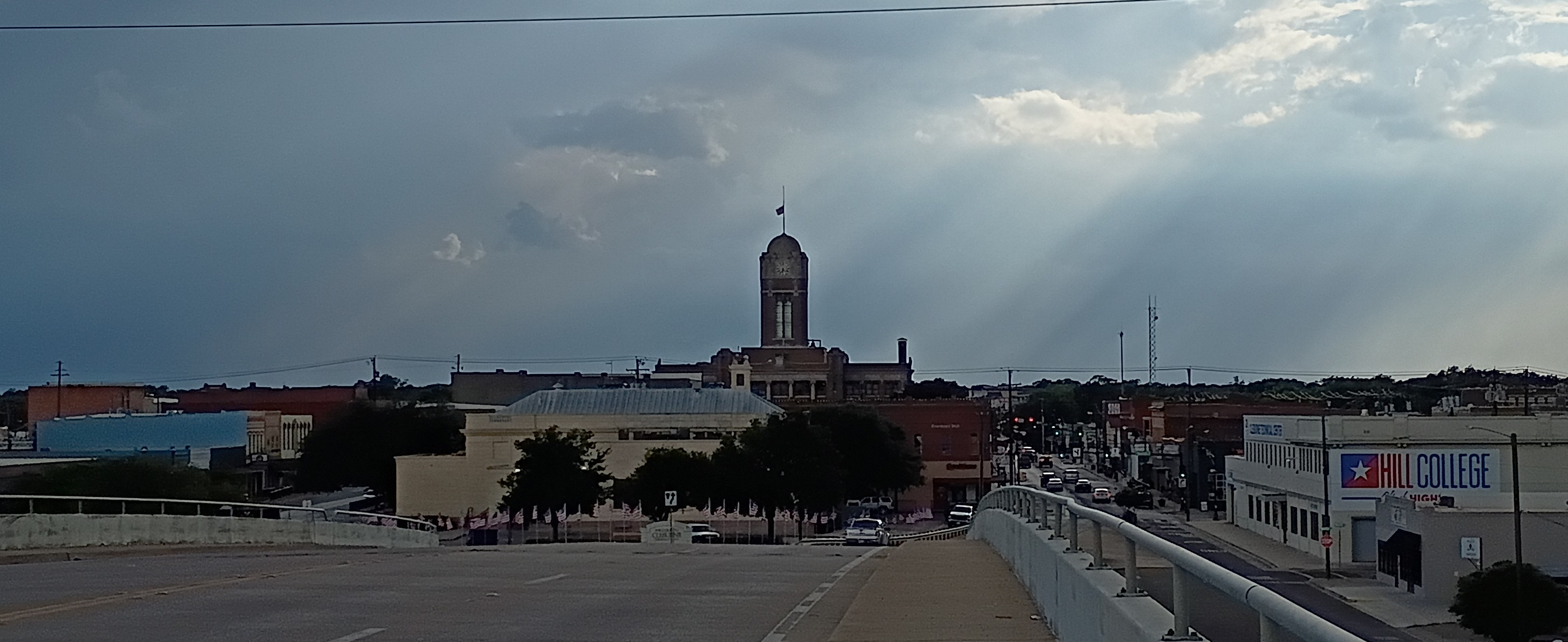
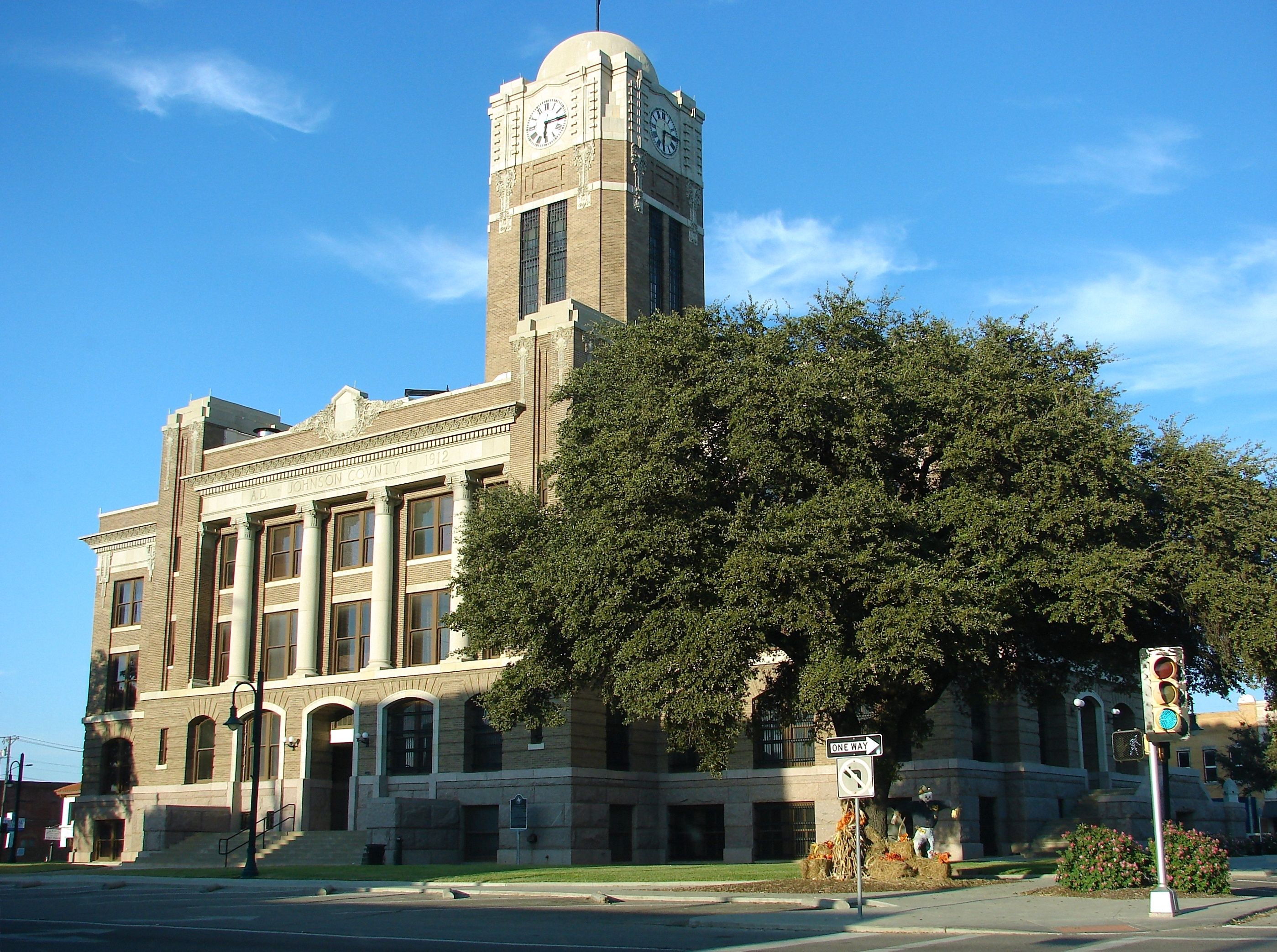
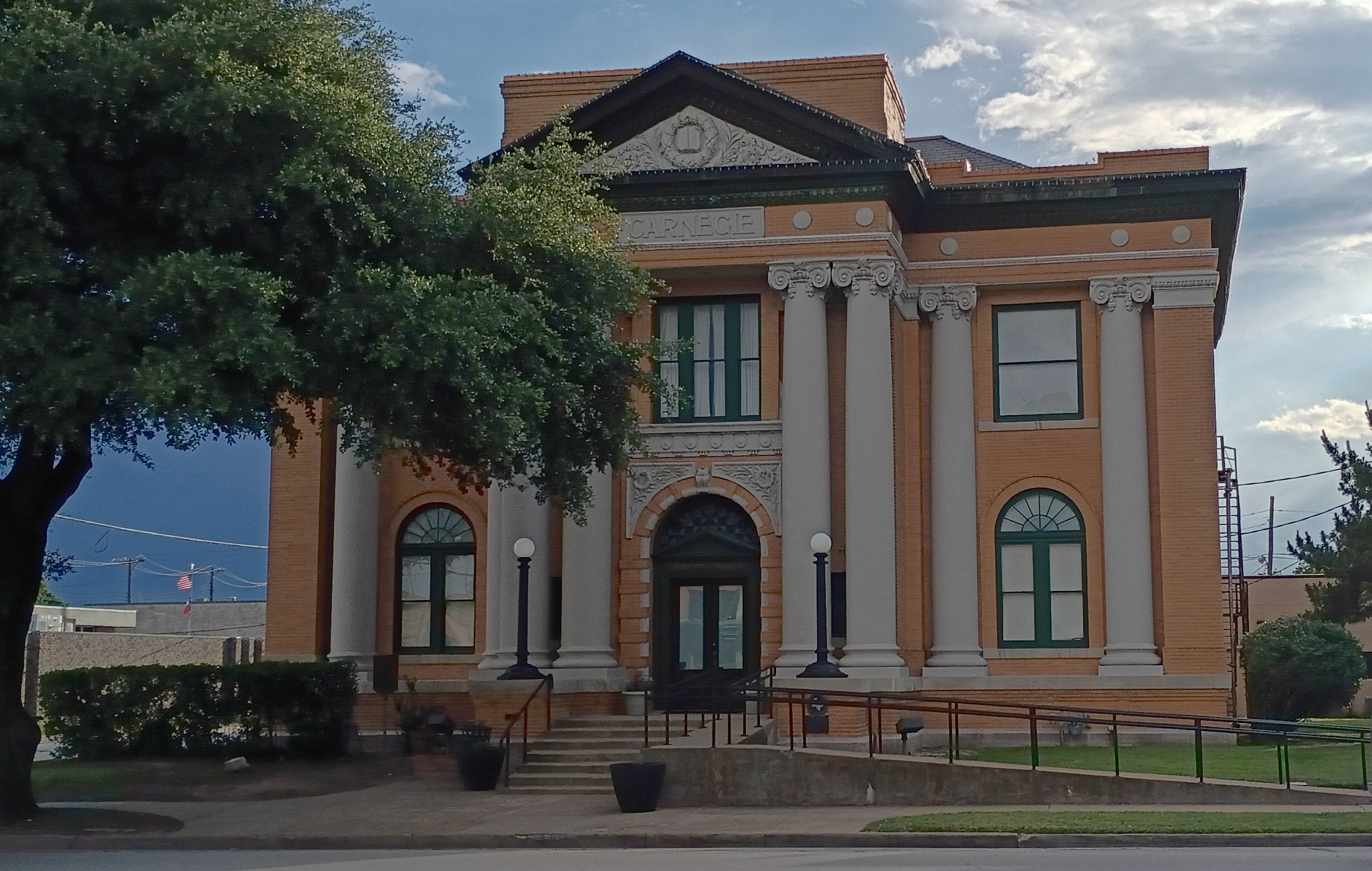
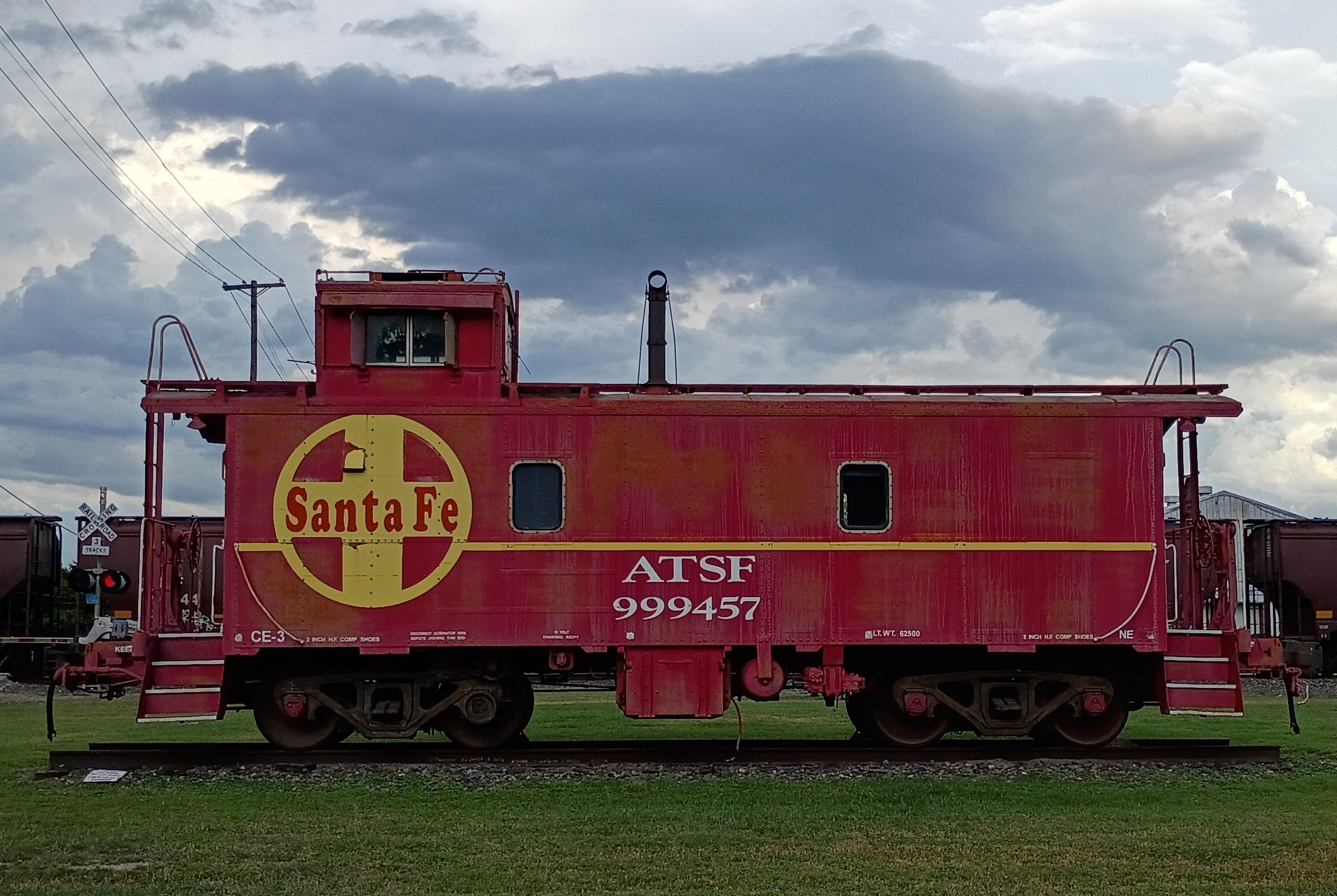
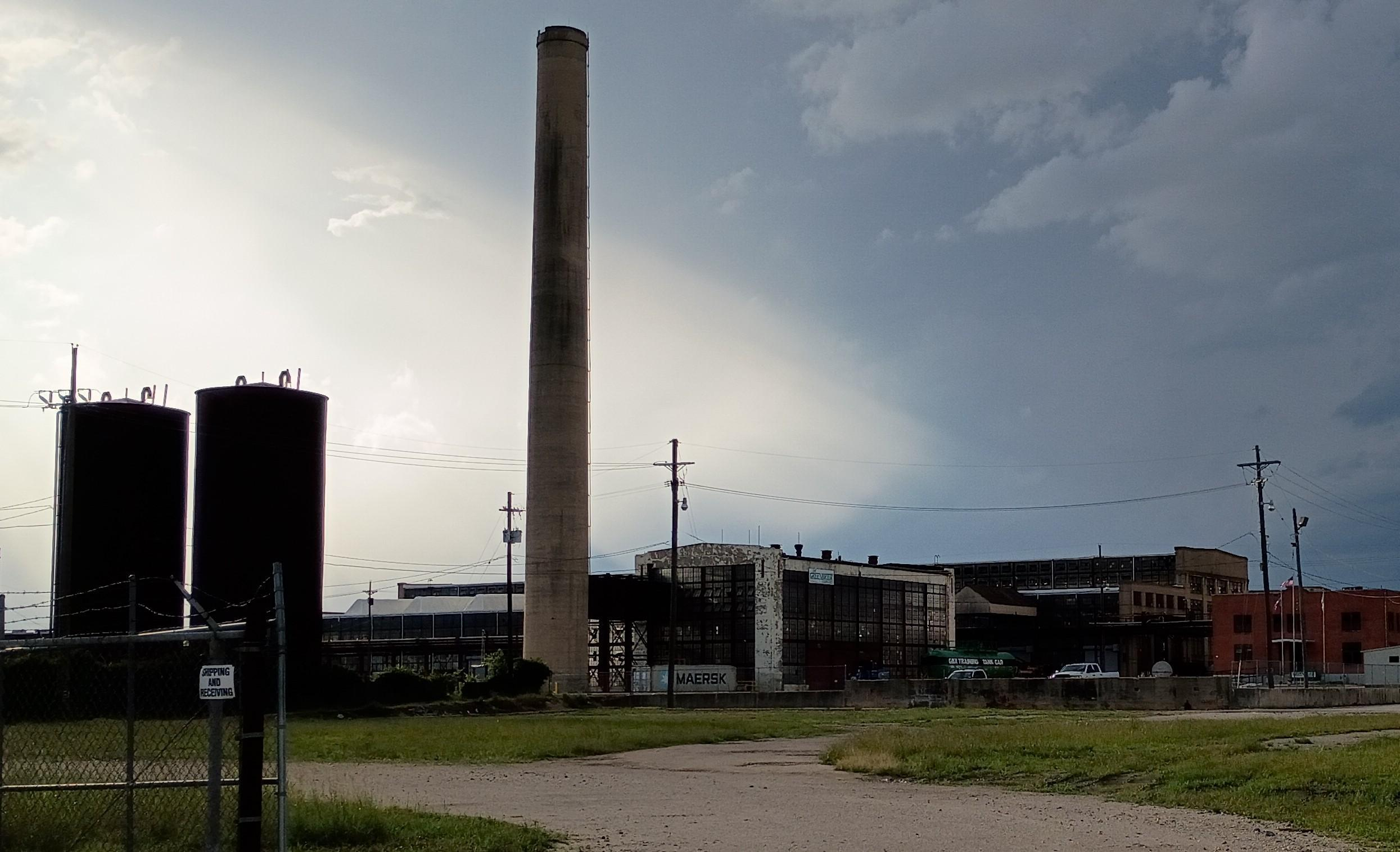
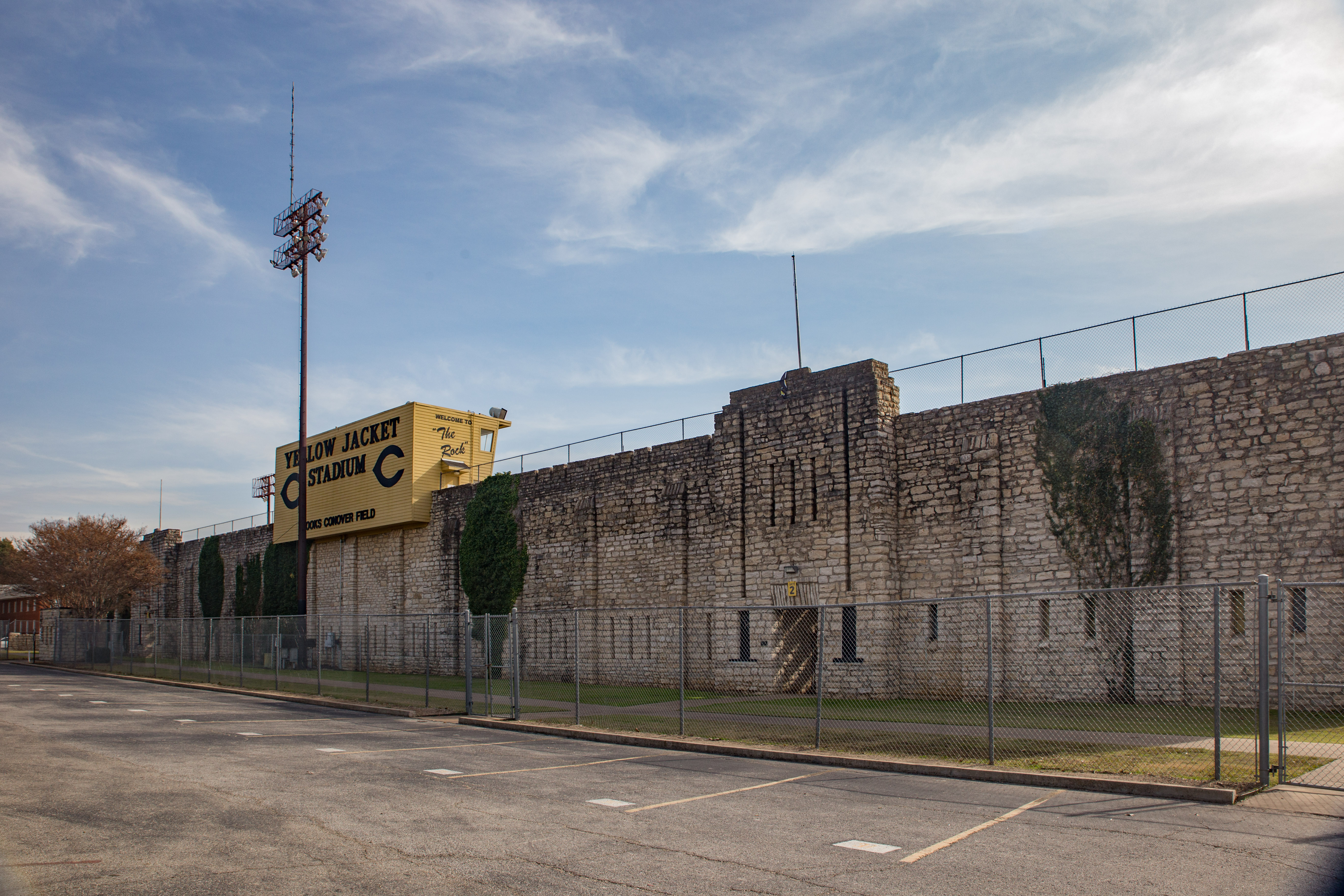
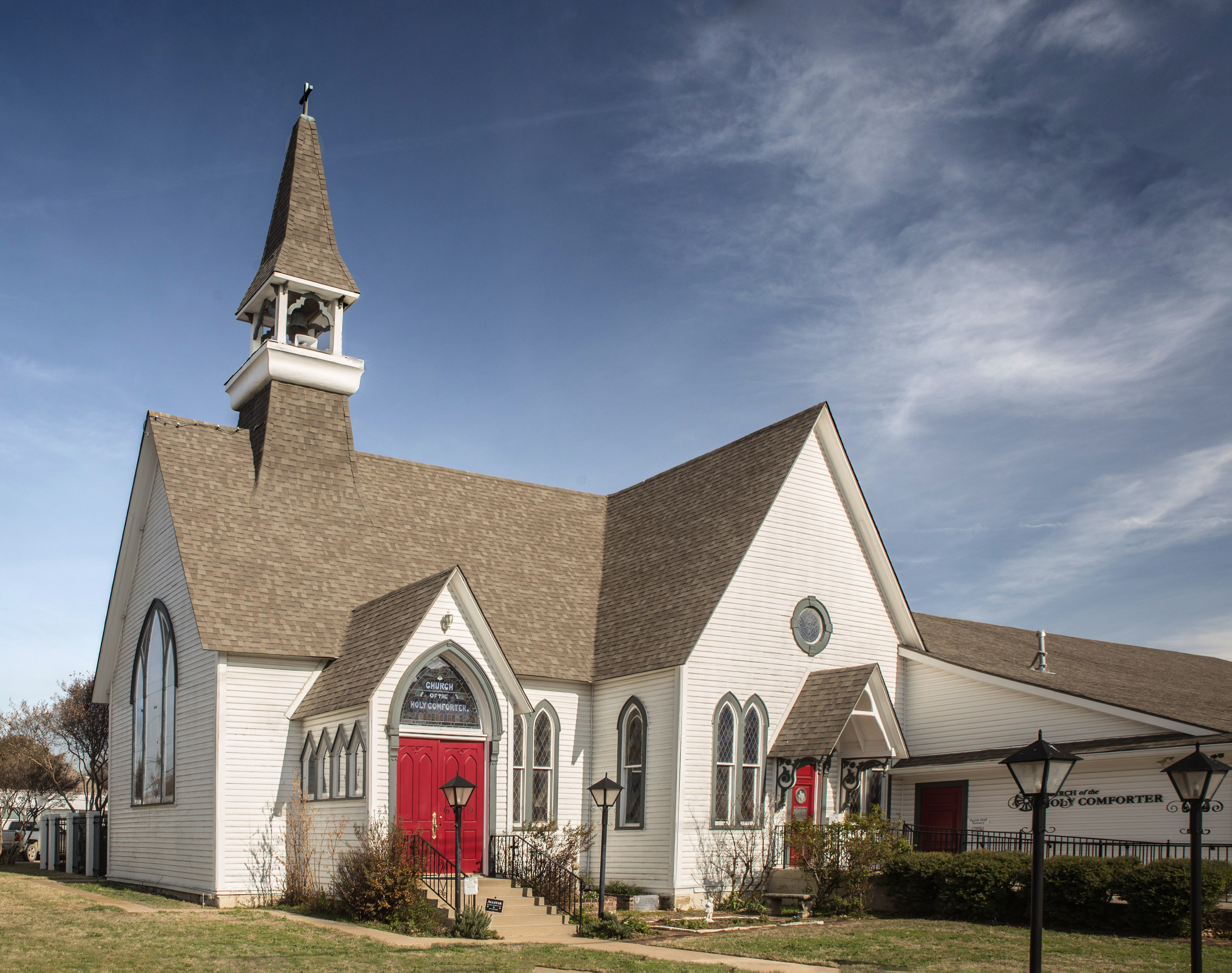
- Downtown Cleburne Johnson County Courthouse Layland Museum of History Santa Fe Caboose Santa Fe Shops Yellow Jacket Stadium Church of the Holy Comforter
- Motto: "This is Texas"
- Interactive map of Cleburne
- Location in Texas Location in the United States
- Coordinates: 32°21′20″N 97°24′30″W
- Country: United States
- State: Texas
- County: Johnson
- Founded: March 23, 1867
- Incorporated: May 3, 1871
- Named for: Patrick R. Cleburne

Government
  - Type: Council-manager
  - Body: Cleburne City Council
  - Mayor: Derek Weathers

Area
  - Total: 36.3 sq mi (94.0 km^{2})
  - Land: 33.4 sq mi (86.5 km^{2})
  - Water: 2.9 sq mi (7.4 km^{2})
- Elevation: 833 ft (254 m)

Population (2020)
  - Total: 31,352
  - Estimate (2024): 38,131▲
  - Density: 939/sq mi (362/km^{2})
- Demonym: Cleburnite

GDP
  - County: $9.608 billion (2024)
- Time zone: UTC-6 (Central (CST))
  - Summer (DST): UTC-5 (CDT)
- ZIP codes: 76031, 76033
- Area codes: 817, 682
- FIPS code: 48-15364
- GNIS feature ID: 2409480
- Website: www.cleburne.net

Cleburne (/ˈkliːbɜːrn/ KLEE-burn) is a city in the U.S. state of Texas and the county seat of Johnson County. Located within the prairies and lakes region of North Texas, the city is located south of Fort Worth and southwest of Dallas. The closest neighboring state is Oklahoma to the north, and the closest international border is to the south with Mexico. Cleburne is the second-most-populous city in Johnson County at 31,352 in 2020. The Dallas-Fort Worth Metroplex, of which Cleburne is a part, has a total population of 8,477,157 in 2025, fourth-largest in the U.S.

Cleburne was founded near Buffalo Creek as Camp Henderson in 1862 and incorporated in 1871, changing its name to honor Patrick R. Cleburne. Ready access to fresh water and being located at the center of the county accounted for the town's early growth. Water access played a key role in luring the Santa Fe shops, where it became the largest employer for the next century. The population grew steadily until the Great Depression, when it contracted until the postwar boom after 1945. The city from then on saw steady growth as people moved to the DFW Metroplex.

Cleburne is crisscrossed with many railroads, thus sees much freight move through, which BNSF Railways controls. Industry makes up a large portion of the economy and is concentrated in the north of town in the industrial parks, many using the railroads. Public services such as city/county employees and school district employees make up large numbers of employed people, as well as retail stores. Proximity to the DFW Metroplex has led to a construction boom in both the residential and industrial sectors.

Cleburne houses many cultural centers, including the Layland Museum of History, Chisholm Trail Outdoor Museum, Cleburne Railroad Museum, J.N. Long Cultural Arts Center, Cleburne Public Library, Dudley Hall, Plaza Main Street Theatre, Helmcamp Community Theatre, and the Hill College extension. The city has many parks, including the Cleburne State Park to the south and Lake Pat Cleburne. Cleburne hosts the Cleburne Railroaders (baseball; AA).

== History ==
=== Founding ===
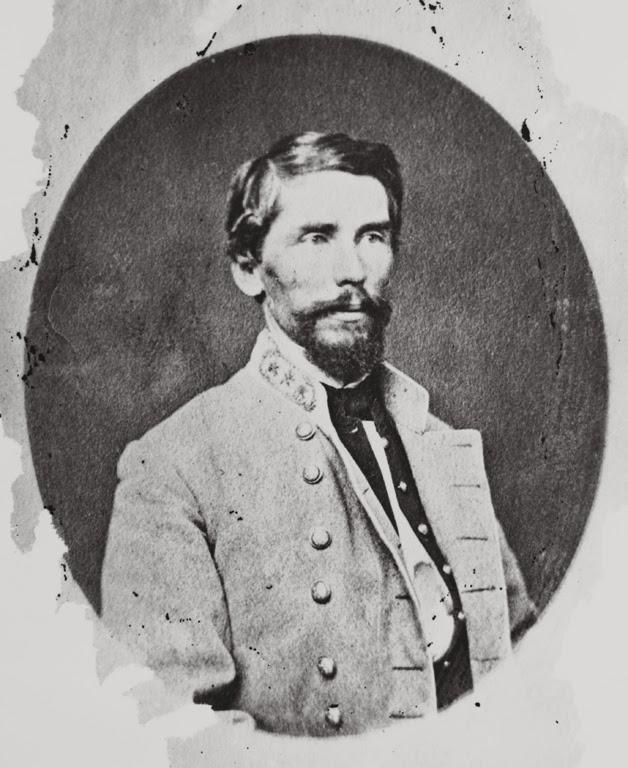
Major General Patrick R. Cleburne

In 1862, Cleburne began as an army camp during the Civil War known as Camp Henderson. The waters of the Buffalo Creeks made for a good site for the first volunteer Confederate camp in Johnson County on Colonel W.F. Henderson's land. Camp Henderson became the third county seat of Johnson County in 1867 after Hood County was established, throwing Buchanan out of the county's legal boundaries. The name was soon changed to Cleburne, named after Patrick R. Cleburne, a major general of the CSA, under whom many of the locals served. Many of the residents of Buchanan relocated to Cleburne along with the public buildings and residences.

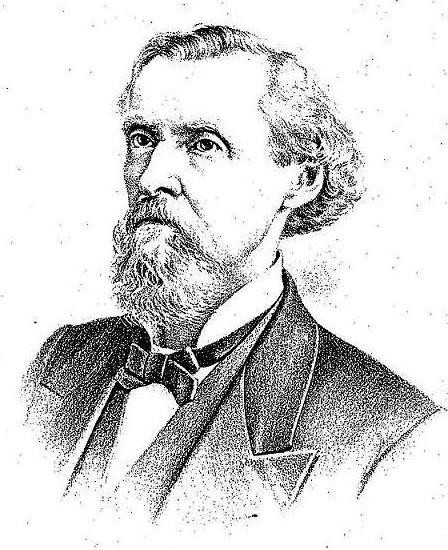
Colonel B.J. Chambers

One of the early city leaders was Colonel B.J. Chambers, who contributed 40 acres of land to the town. He owned large lots throughout Johnson County, but ended up selling most of it to help fund public improvements in town. He aided in surveying and laying out lots, donated land for a public cemetery, and continued making improvements and aiding enterprises towards the welfare of the town. Another early leader was Colonel W.F. Henderson, a business partner of Chambers'. Henderson donated half the lots that made up Cleburne, giving the town an early head start.

=== Late 1800s ===
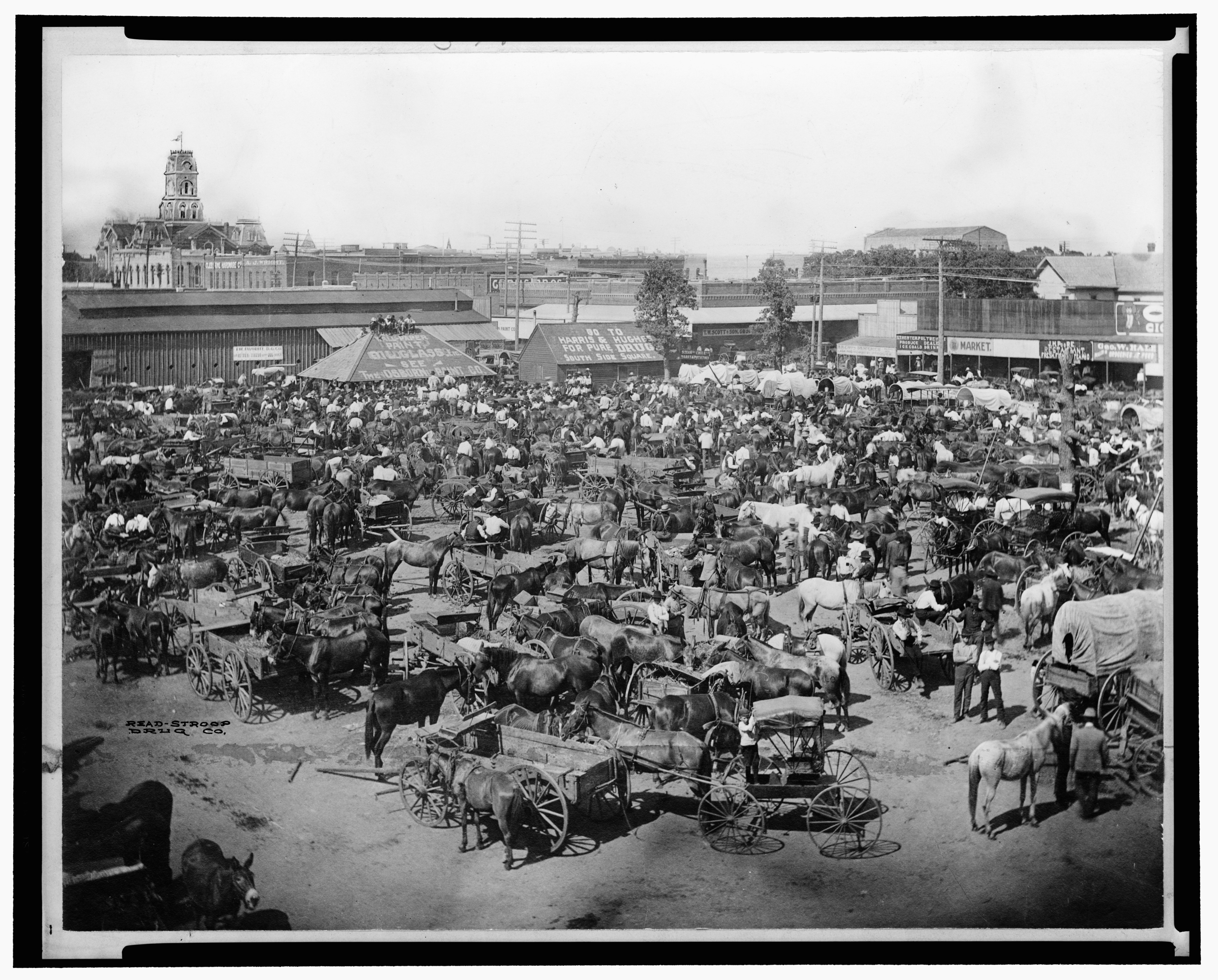
Market Square in Cleburne

Cleburne was incorporated on May 3, 1871, with John Cunningham serving as the town's first mayor. The city limits extended half a mile in each direction from the public square. The early municipal government found rather difficult the governing people who were used to living on the frontier, and who quickly came at odds over the early ordinances that were passed. Due to these difficulties, the council in 1873 did virtually nothing, prompting citizens to vote candidates in the next election under a "do nothing" ticket. Citizens later signed a petition causing the disestablishment of the city government that "outlived its usefulness". The city government was re-established in 1876 to deal with "rip-roarius" human beings.

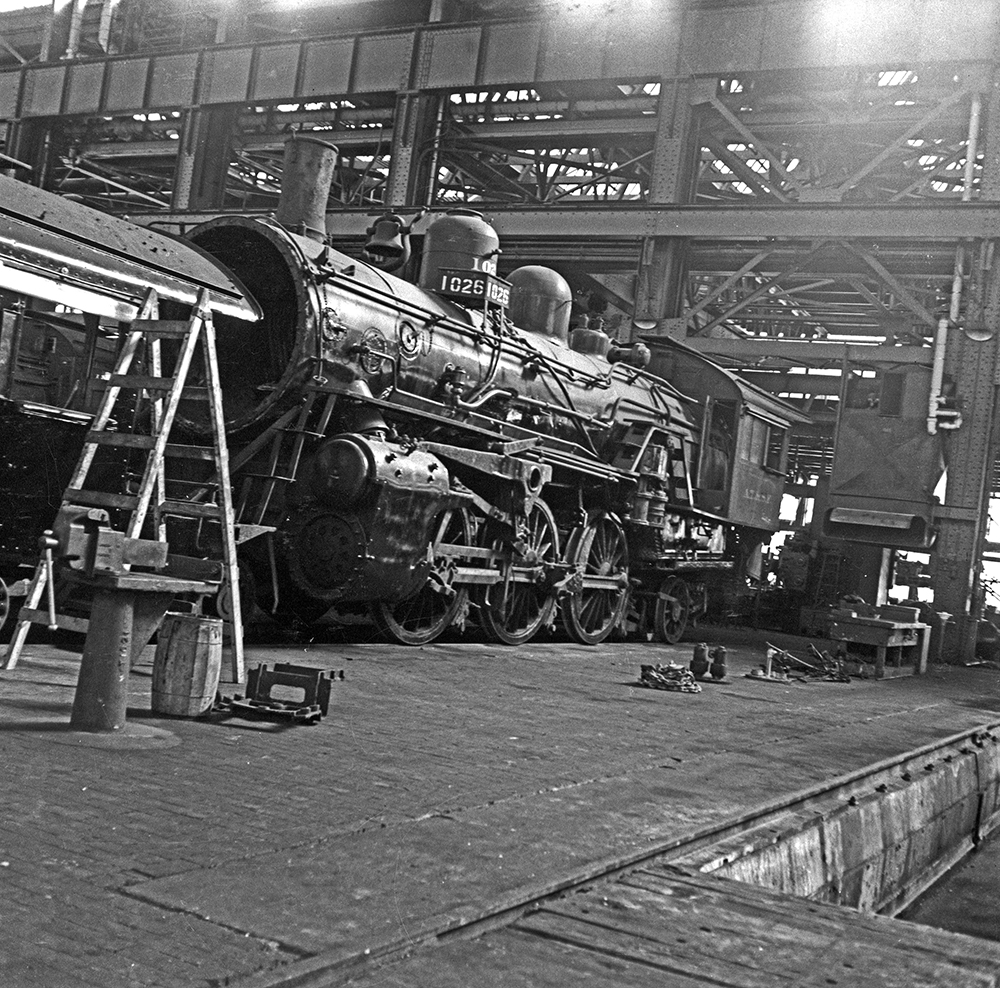
Inside the Santa Fe Shops

Early industrial growth in the city was characterized as slow and steady, never experiencing a "boom or bust". In 1881, the railroad came to Cleburne, but was not met with much fanfare. Excitement grew, however, when the city won the contract for the Santa Fe shops in 1897. The shops became fully operational in 1899. Existing lines in Cleburne included one between Fort Worth and Temple built by Santa Fe in 1881, the Dallas branch of the Chicago, Texas, and Mexican Central in 1884, and the Weatherford branch of the Santa Fe in 1887. In 1895, Cleburne had access to electric lighting for the first time, provided by the Cleburne Electric Light Company. Telephones came in 1897, provided by the Bell Telephone Company.

=== Early to mid 1900s ===
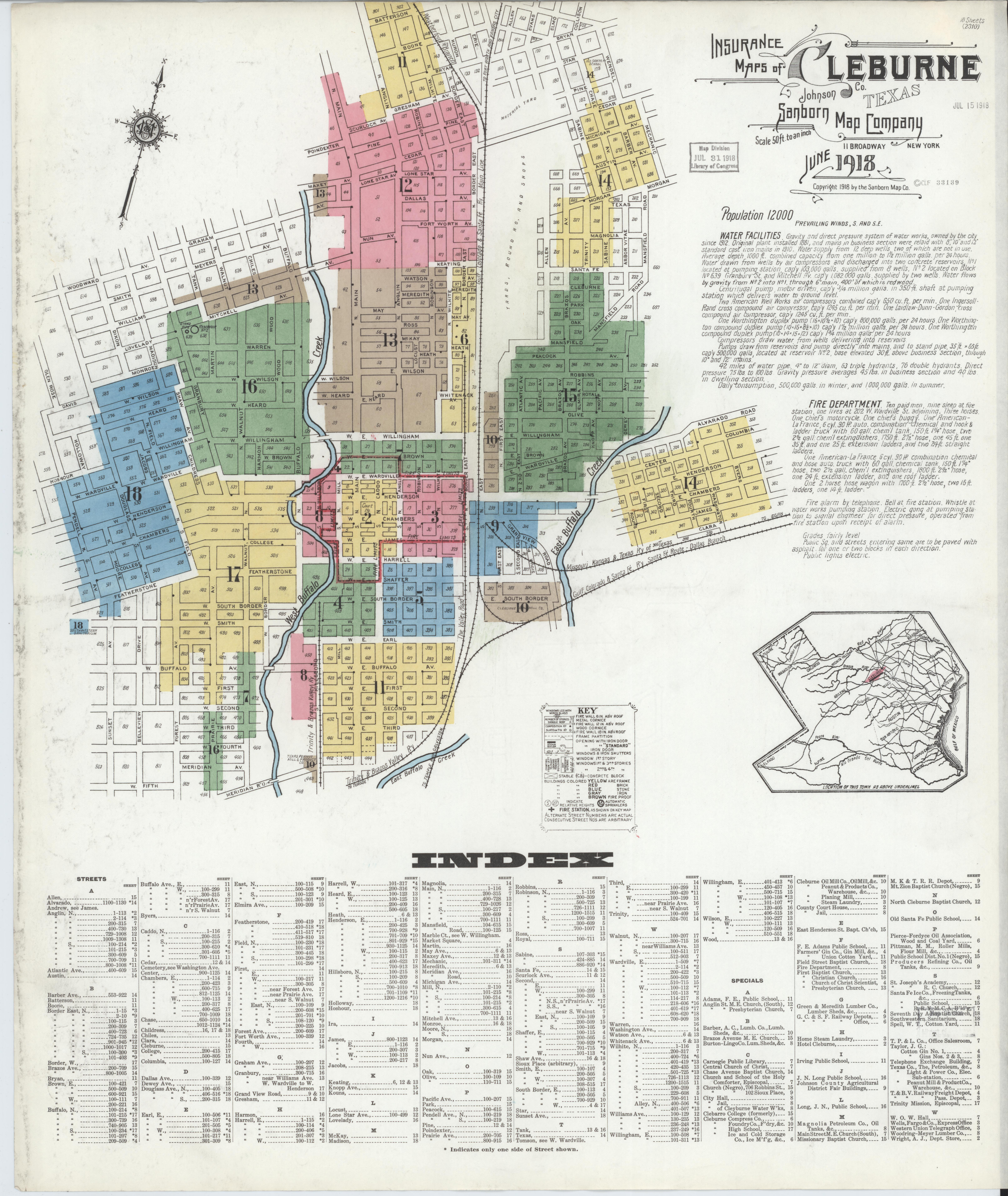
Cleburne in 1918

The Texas State Federation of Labor, after several attempts during the 1890s, organized in January 1900 in Cleburne. The convention had 23 delegates representing 8,475 members from seven cities and had early success that corresponded with the early progressive movement in Texas. The Cleburne Public Library had its origins in 1901 under the direction of the local women's club, who in 1902, secured funding from Andrew Carnegie to build a library that opened in 1905. In 1909, the State Christian Junior College moved from Denton to Cleburne, operating as Clebarro Junior College until its closing in 1919.

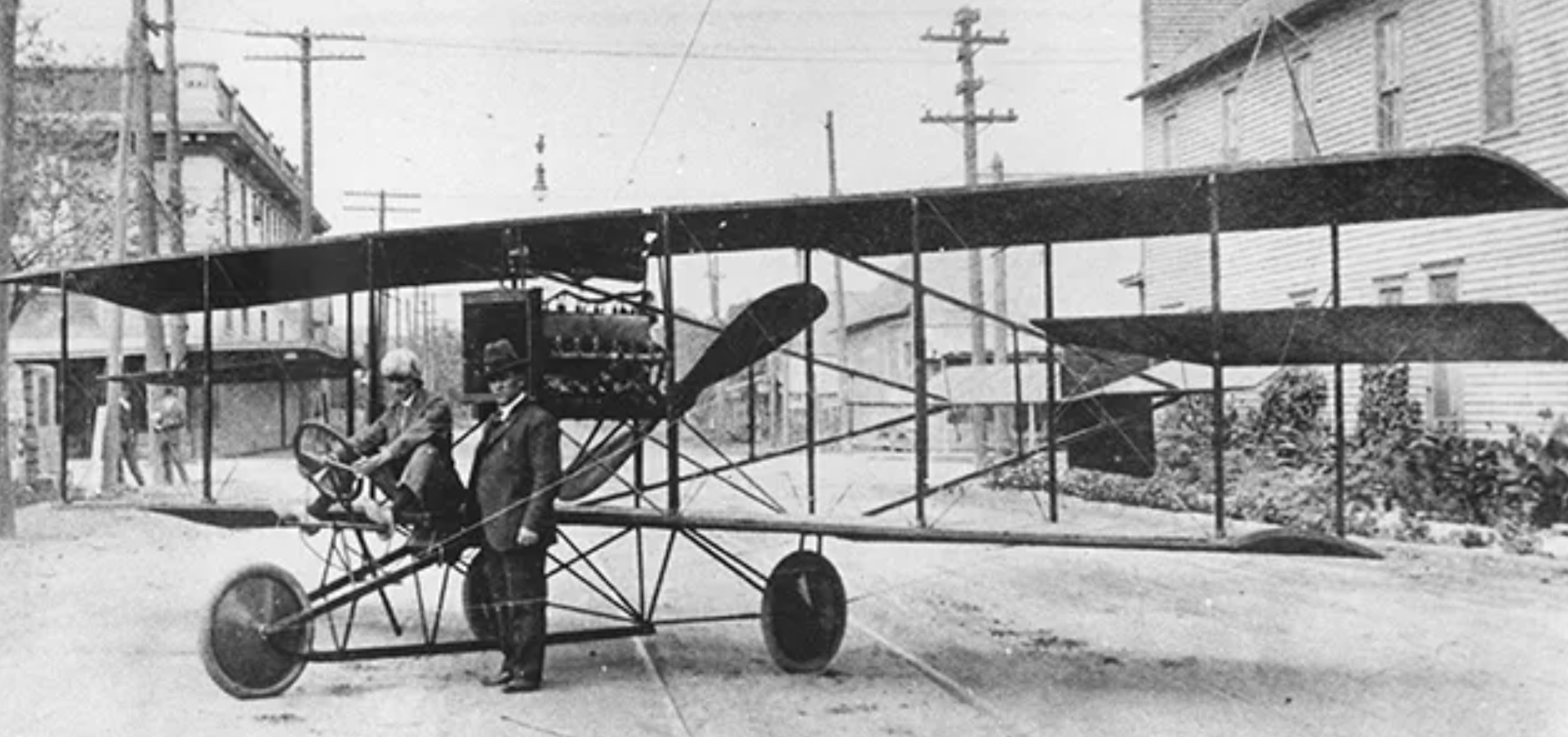
Old Soggy No.1

Several railroads came to Cleburne around this time, including the Dallas, Cleburne, and Southwestern Railway in 1902, and the Trinity and Brazos Valley Railway in 1904. The latter was sold to the Missouri, Kansas and Texas in 1910 before being abandoned by 1920. Cleburne operated a local streetcar service from 1911 until 1917, while the interurban of Fort Worth served Cleburne beginning in 1912, operating for 18 years. Between 1911 and 1914, the Cleburne Motor Car Manufacturing Company produced the "Luck" truck, "Luck" utility, and the "Cleburne" car. The Texas Motor Car Association built "Texan" cars in Cleburne between 1918 and 1922. In 1911, Slats Rodgers built the first airplane in Texas in Cleburne. He named the craft Old Soggy No.1 due to a drooping right wing. The 1883 courthouse burned to the ground on April 15, 1912, the same day the Titanic sank. Albert Bledsoe, an assistant city marshal, perished in the fire while fighting it on the second floor with a squad of men. Construction of the new courthouse, designed by Charles Erwin Barglebaugh, was completed in 1913.

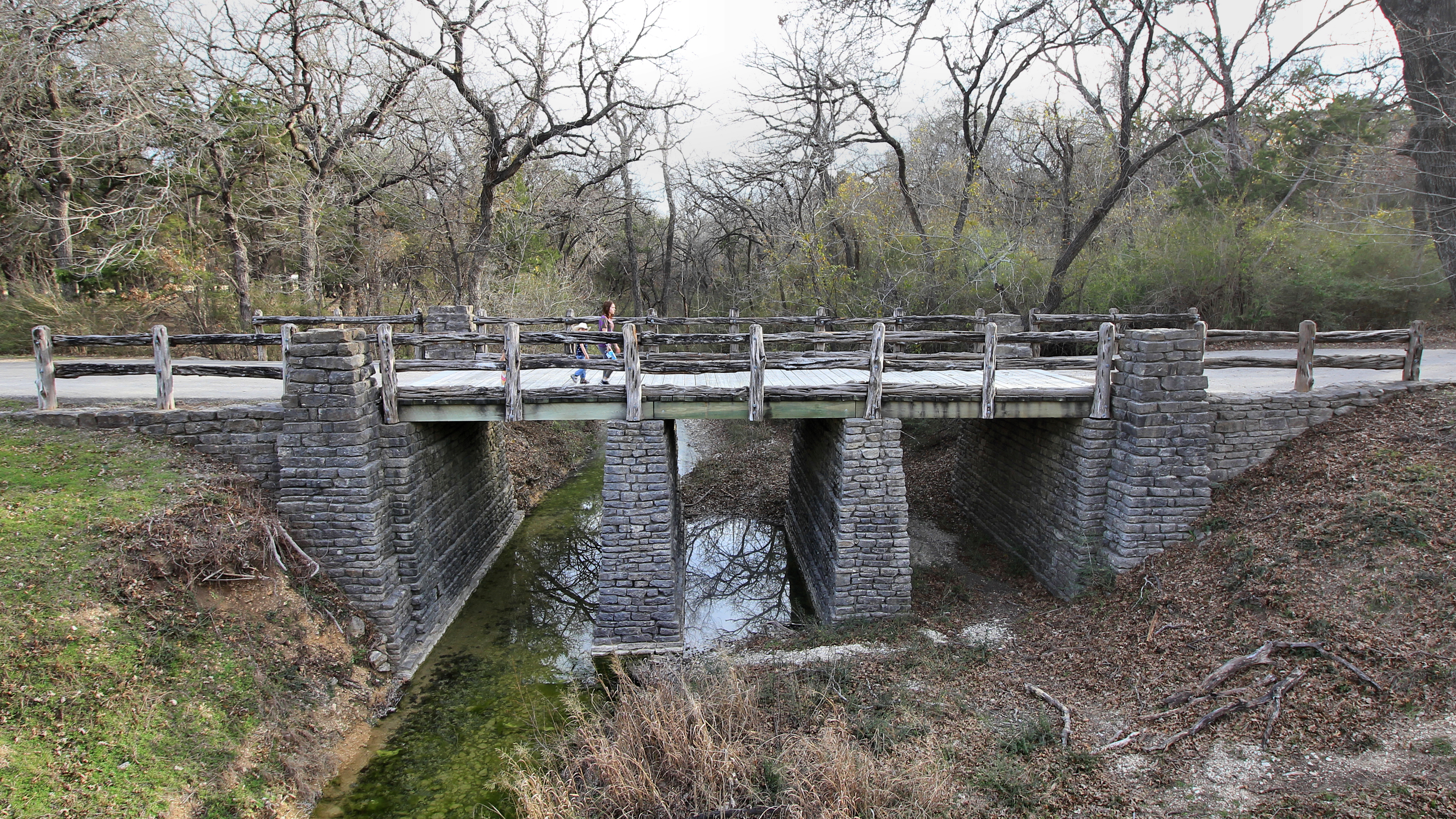
Camp Creek Bridge, Built by CCC Company 3804

By 1920, Cleburne had reached a population of 12,820. During the '20s, the failure of all four banks in town, a regional agricultural depression, and a strike at the Santa Fe shops that required the Texas Rangers to end, caused the local economy to buckle well before the Great Depression set in. Cleburne also dealt with frequent large dust storms from the Dust Bowl during the 1930s. These factors likely led to the decreased population of 10,558 in 1940. In 1935, The Civilian Conservation Corp established Company 3804 to live and work on Cleburne State Park, building roads, the dam, and stacked-rock structures, until work ceased in 1940. Between 1939 and 1940, the Works Progress Administration constructed Yellow Jacket Stadium. Built of concrete and rough-cut limestone from Somervell County, it replaced Rhome Field as the home of the Cleburne Yellow Jackets. During World War II, the library housed a war information center. In 1944, Camp Cleburne for German prisoners of war was established, which provided labor to shorthanded farms in Johnson County. Prior to the war, the Battery B, 132nd Field Artillery, 36th Infantry Division (I.D.) trained in Johnson County, later being deployed overseas in 1942. The courthouse held the draft board and rationing board.

=== Late 1900s to 2000s ===
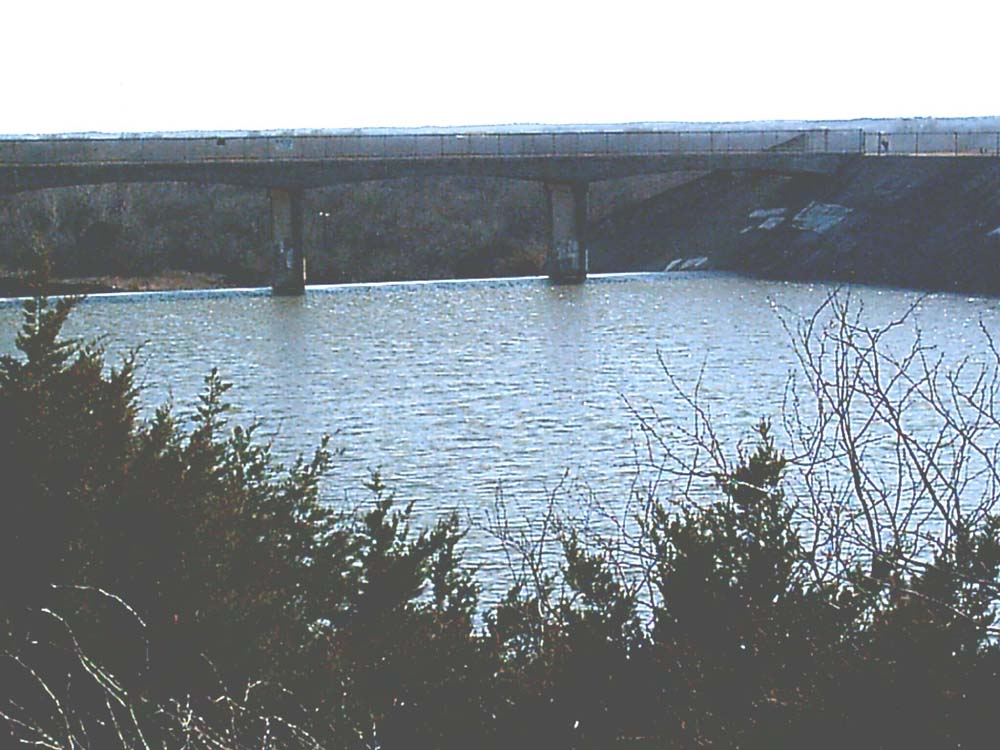
Dam at Lake Pat Cleburne

Starting in 1950, Cleburne along with much of Texas, suffered through one of the worst droughts in the state's history. Relief did not come until 1957, when torrential rains fell in May of that year. The 1954 Supreme Court case Brown v. Board of Education had a direct effect on Cleburne, since it practiced racial segregation under state law. Due to wording in the court decision, change did not come until the passage of the Civil Rights Acts and the threat of federal legal action. This culminated in the closing of the Booker T. Washington High School of Cleburne in 1965. However, in 1968, the school district got swept up in the case United States v. Texas, which found that the state still practiced segregation, thus came under federal supervision. Several city projects occurred during the 1960s, including the damming of the Nolan River to create Lake Pat Cleburne, and the opening of the Cleburne Regional Airport.

In 1973, the GOEX munitions plant experienced an explosion that killed four and injured 35, most of them women. The same plant experienced two more explosions, one in 1978 and another in 1983, killing a combined six people. In 1974, Hill College built a 32-acre extension in Cleburne by the lake. Several tornadoes touched down directly northwest of Cleburne, causing damage to several rural structures in May 1976. The city faced legal action in the case of City of Cleburne v. Cleburne Living Center for denying a permit in 1980. The Supreme Court in 1985 ruled against the city, saying that it violated the Equal Protection Clause of the Fourteenth Amendment. Cleburne faced a different issue in 1980, when it denied the use of the civic center to the KKK on the grounds of it being controversial, which led to a march on the courthouse that made the news. The opening of the Comanche Peak Nuclear Plant in the '80s provided new well-paying jobs to the city. Later on in 1989, the Santa Fe shops closed, with the Greenbrier Companies purchasing the shops in 1992.

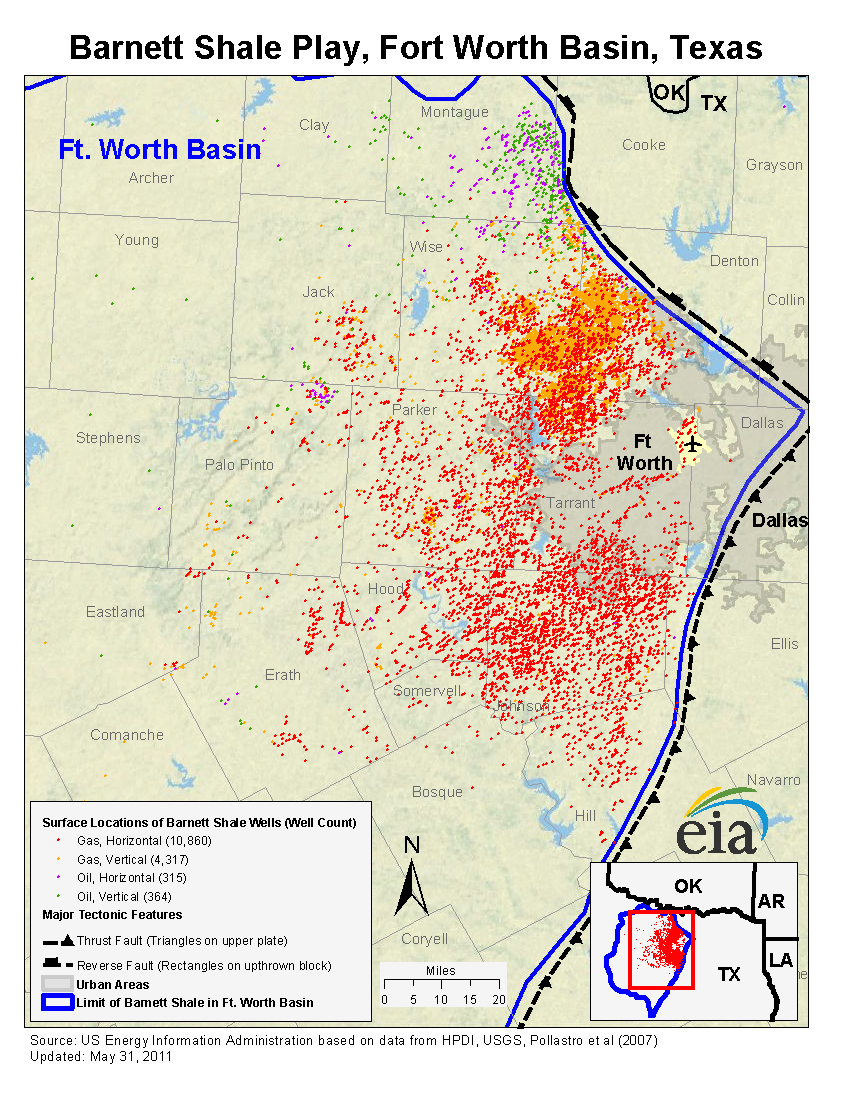
Barnett Shale

By 2000, Cleburne had a population of 26,005. During the first decade of the 2000s, Cleburne underwent a natural-gas boom from the fracking of the Barnett Shale. The city also experienced its first recorded earthquakes in the region, with a probable link to the fracking in the area. During this boom in 2005, the courthouse received renovations and was rededicated in 2007. Beginning in 2010, Cleburne experienced another drought that persisted into 2015. In 2013, however, a severe weather outbreak occurred that would result in an EF3, mile-wide tornado through southern Cleburne after crossing over the lake. About 600 homes were damaged, with 9 people suffering minor injuries. The drought came to an end with record-breaking rain in May 2015. The Chisholm Trail Parkway, opened in 2014, linked Cleburne directly to downtown Fort Worth. February 2021 brought one of the harshest freezes the city has experienced in recent memory. In 2026, an EF0 tornado crossed the lake with no reported damage.

== Geography ==
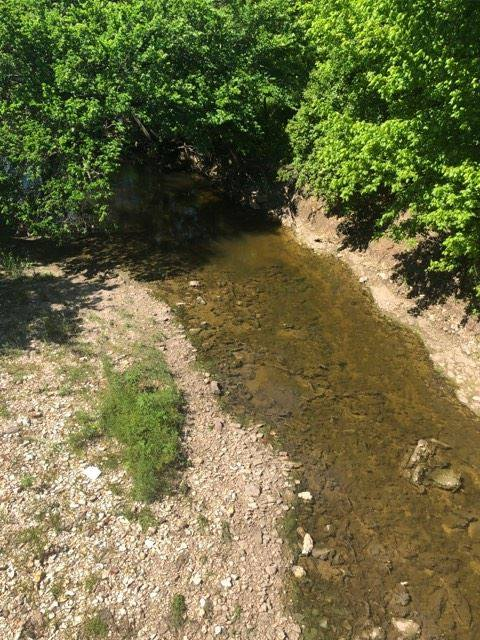
Buffalo Creek in Cleburne

Cleburne has a total area of 36.28 square miles (94.0 km^{2}), of which 2.86 square miles (7.4 km^{2}) are covered by water. Lake Pat Cleburne's conservation pool lies at 733 feet (223 m) above mean sea level. The city consists of low-rolling to flat terrain with sandy clay loam and dark calcareous clay topsoils. Scrub brush, cacti, mesquite, and grasses are the predominant flora supported in this environment. The East and West Buffalo Creeks cut through to the south, where they meet the Nolan River. The average elevation of the city is 833 feet (254 m). The highest elevation lies in the northwest at 974 feet (297 m), while the lowest elevation sits to the south at 682 feet (208 m).

Cleburne lies in the geographic center of Johnson County and borders Joshua to the north and Keene to the east. Other cities in the county include Burleson, Briaroaks, and Cross Timber to the north, and Alvarado, Coyote Flats and Venus are to the east. Rio Vista and Grandview are to the south and southeast, while Godley and Cresson are to the northwest.

=== Architecture ===
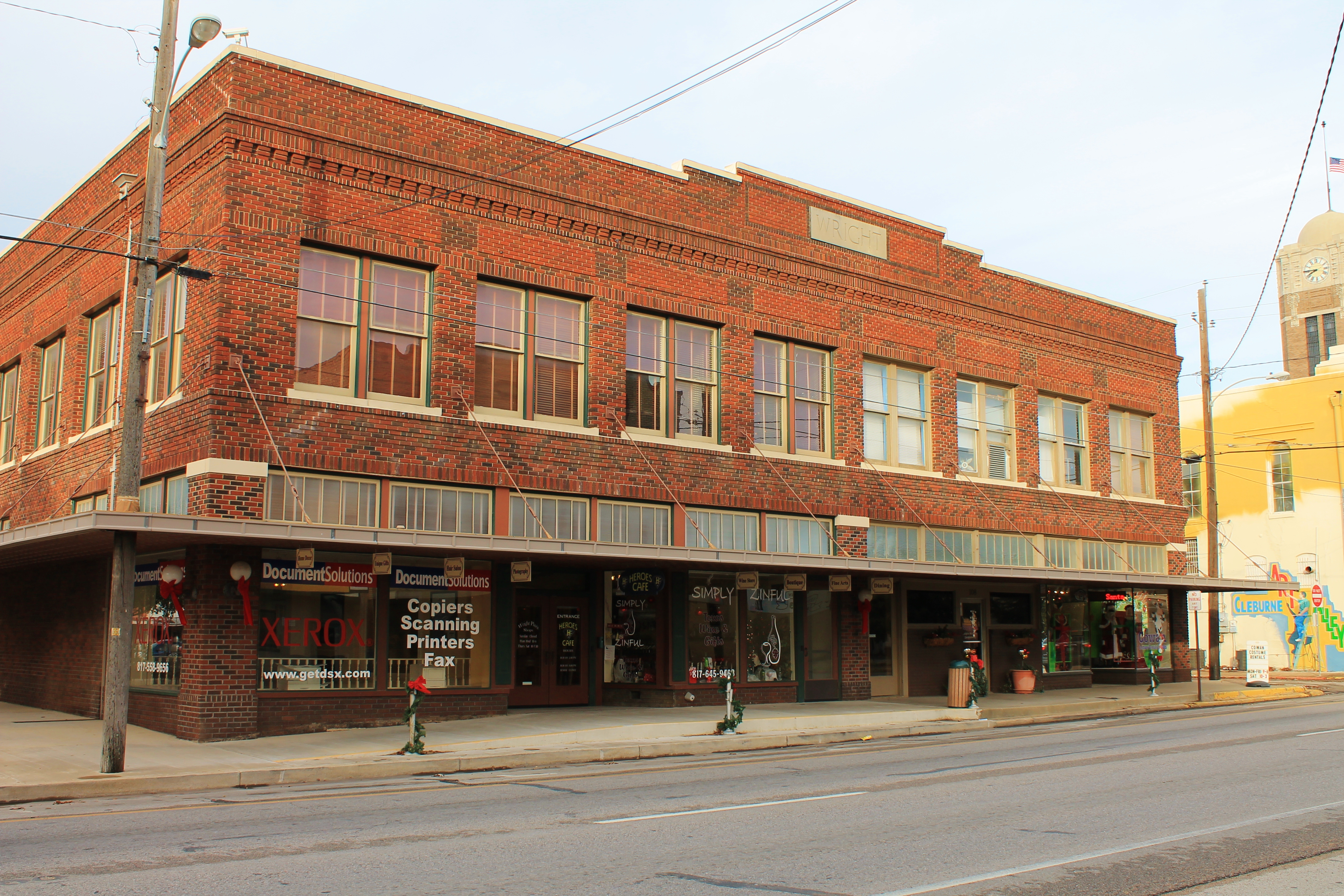
Wright Building

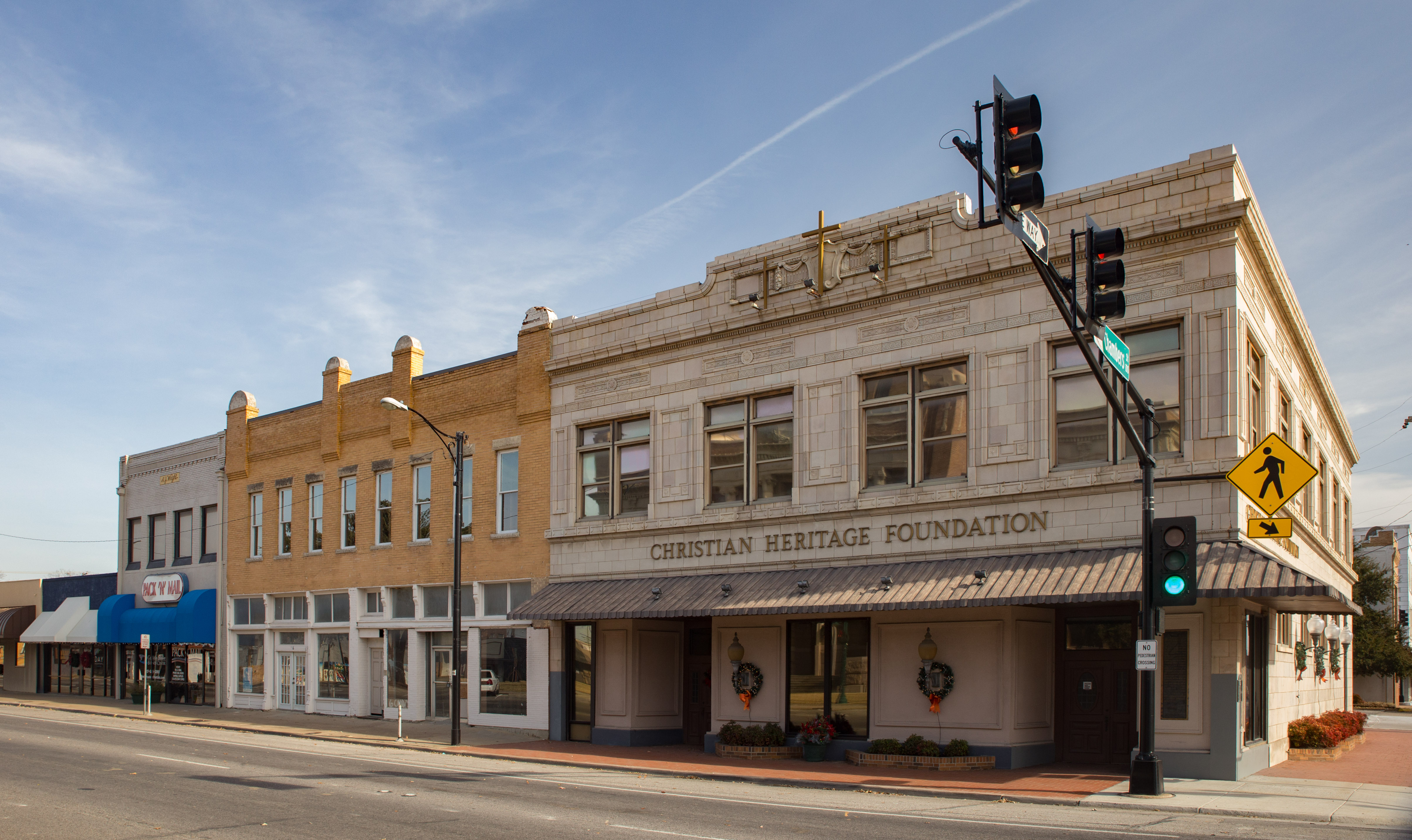
Historic Downtown District

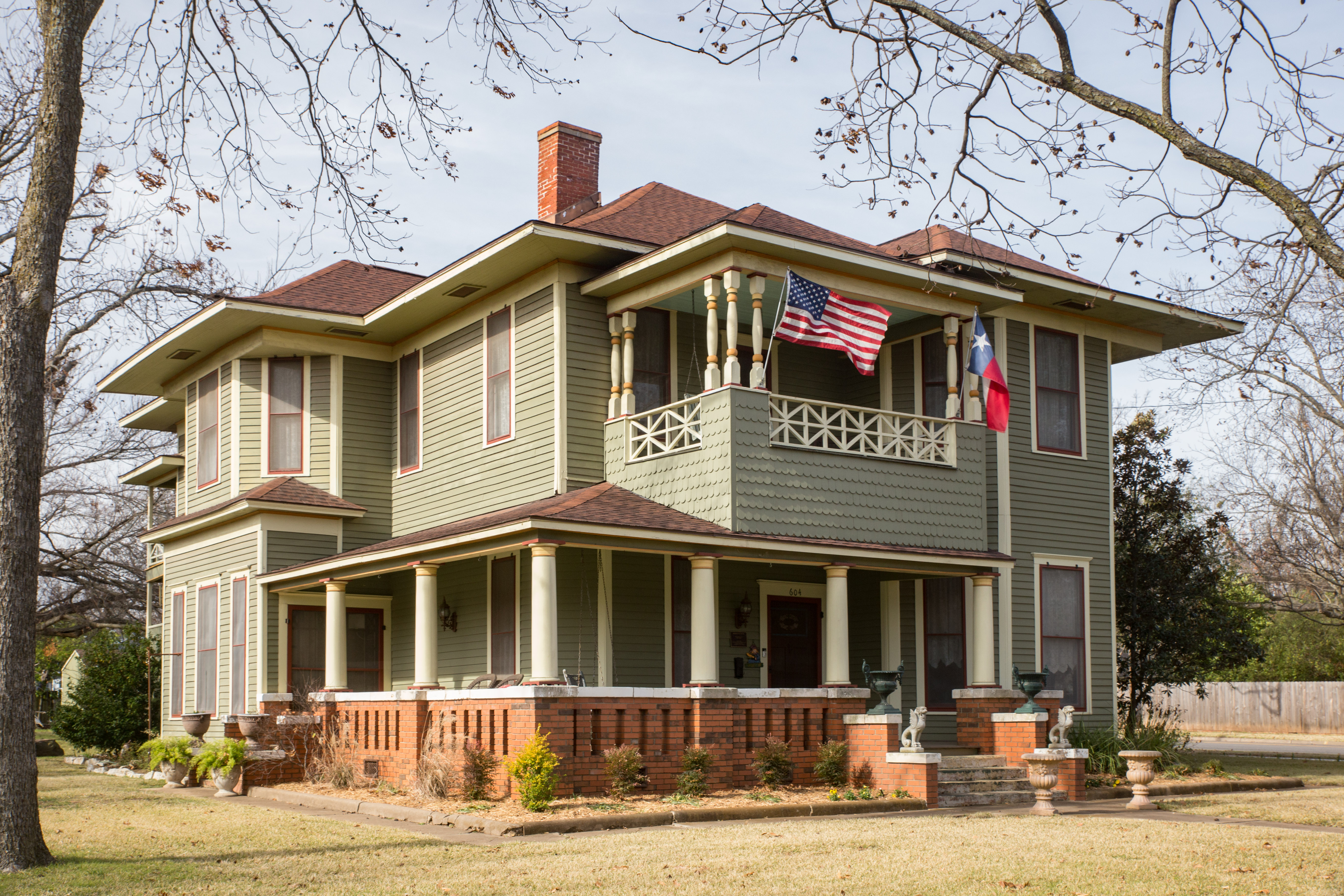
Joiner-Long House

Cleburne has several buildings and a district listed on the National Register of Historic Places. The Cleburne Downtown Historic District contains buildings spanning from 1877 to 1968 that showcase local and national building styles. The first building in Cleburne built by a professional architect was the Carnegie Library Building, a two-story Classical Revival building partly financed by the Carnegie Foundation. It was built in 1905 by Zimmerman and McCoy under contract by Smith and Moore. The 1912 Johnson County Courthouse was designed by Dallas architects Lang and Witchell with Charles E. Barglebaugh to replace the 1883 courthouse after it burned down. The 1912 courthouse follows the Classical Revival style with Prairie-style elements. The Wright Building is a two-story masonry commercial building built in 1893 and doubled in size in 1916. Its initial purpose was as a wagon and saddle shop. The Joiner-Long House, built in 1895 and added to in 1910, represents a mix of the original Victorian style and the later Colonial Revival style.

Buildings on the List of Recorded Texas Historic Landmarks include the Church of the Holy Comforter, John L. and Annie Upshaw Cleveland House, Johnson County Feeders Supply, Dotey-Kirkham House (Little Old House) and Yellow Jacket Stadium.

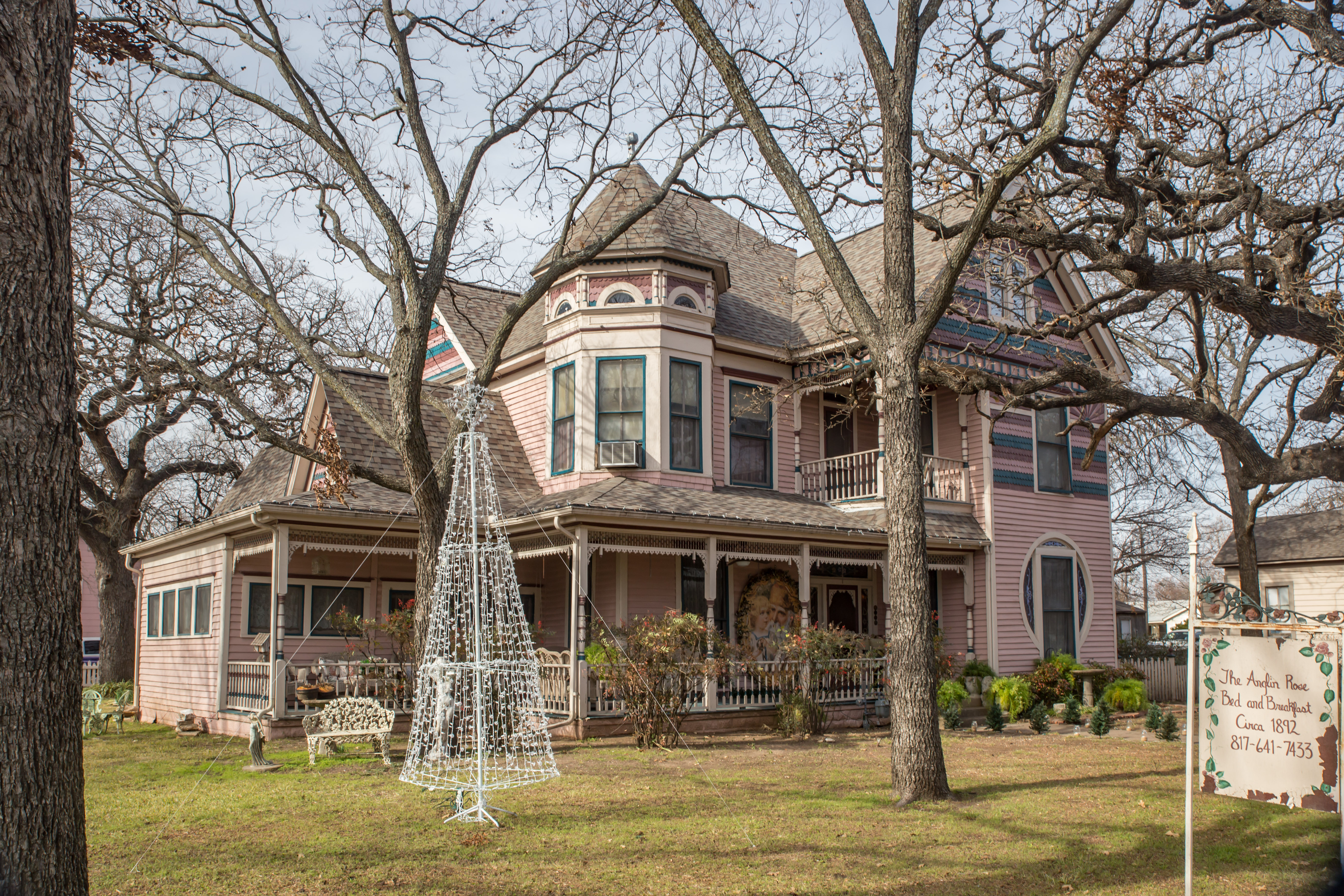
John L. and Annie Upshaw Cleveland House

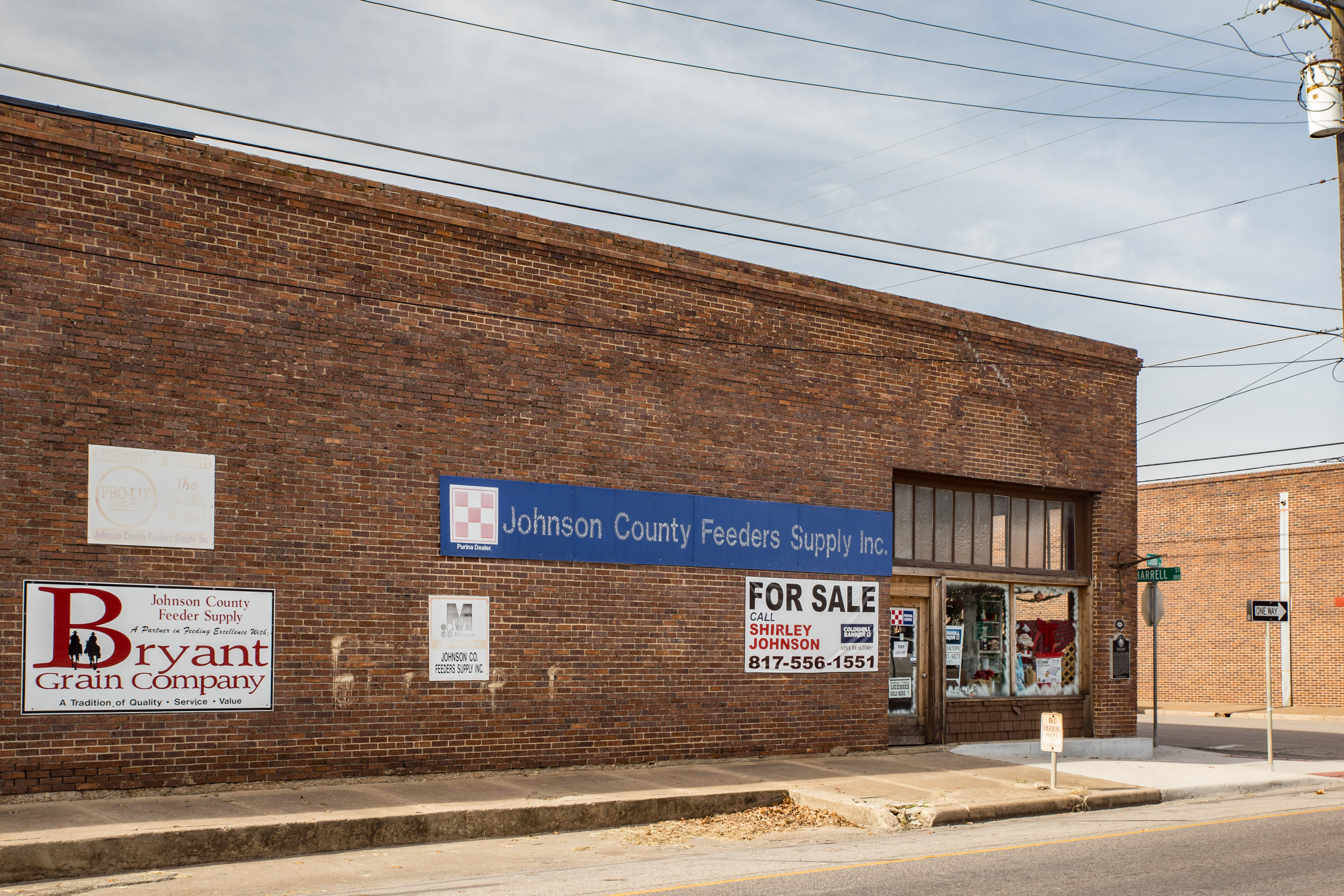
Johnson County Feeders Supply

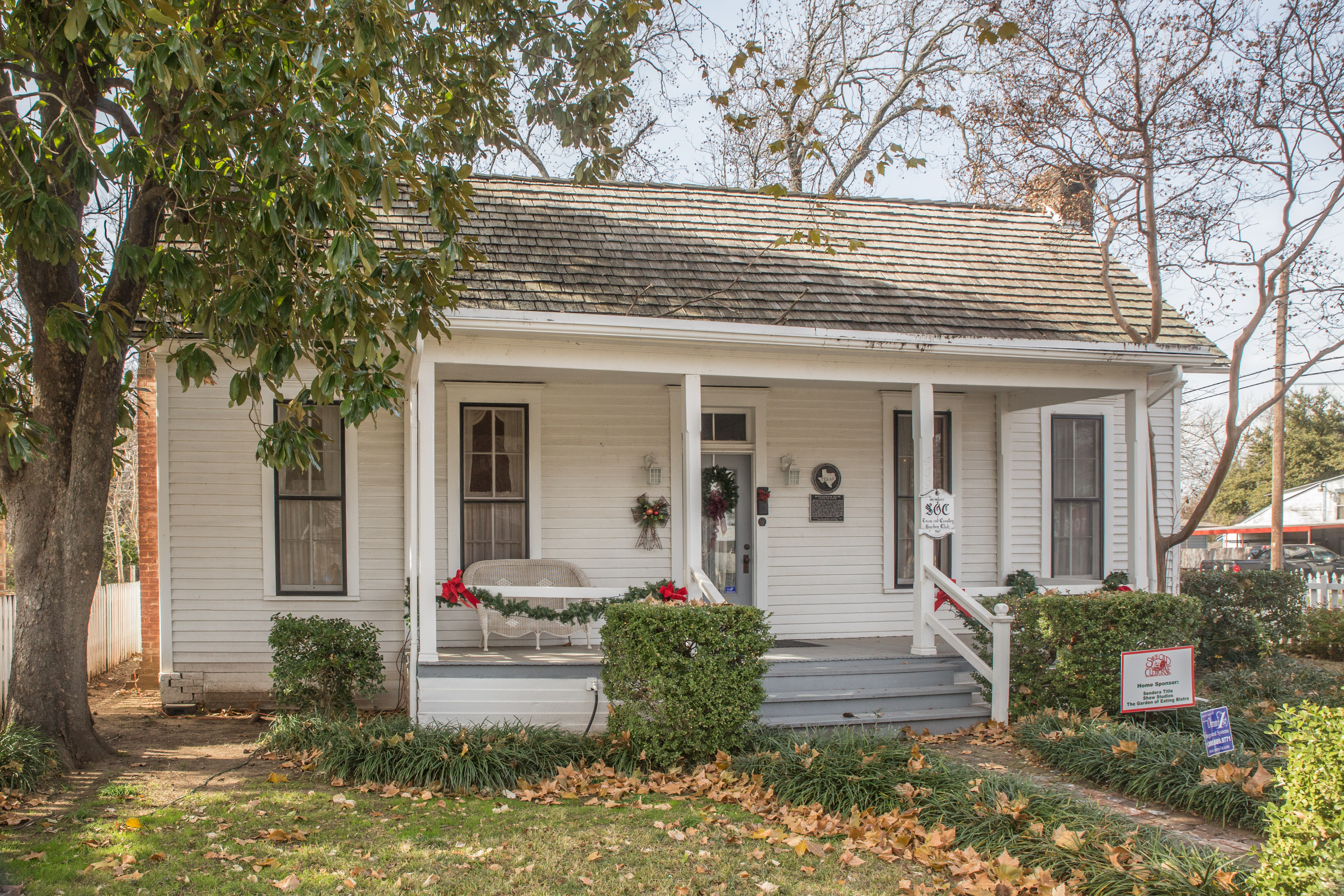
Dotey-Kirkham House (Little Old House)

=== Climate ===
Cleburne

Climate chart (precipitation, max. and min. temperature)
J	F	M	A	M	J	J	A	S	O	N	D
2.6 57 33	2.5 61 37	3.5 68 45	3.1 76 53	4.3 83 62	3.9 90 70	2.1 95 73	2.8 95 72	3 89 66	4.4 78 54	2.9 67 44	2.5 58 36
- █ Average max. and min. temperatures in °F
- █ Precipitation totals in inches
Metric conversion
J	F	M	A	M	J	J	A	S	O	N	D
66 14 1	64 16 3	88 20 7	78 25 11	108 28 17	99 32 21	54 35 23	72 35 22	77 31 19	113 26 12	74 19 6	64 15 2
- █ Average max. and min. temperatures in °C
- █ Precipitation totals in mm

Cleburne has a warm and temperate climate, categorized as a humid subtropical climate (Cfa) on the Köppen-Geiger climate classification. The average annual high temperature is 76.5 °F (24.7 °C), 95.3 °F (35.2 °C) in the summer and 56.8 °F (13.8 °C) in the winter. The average annual low temperature is 53.6 °F (12.0 °C), 72.5 °F (22.5 °C) in the summer and 33.3 °F (0.7 °C) in the winter. Weather patterns in North Texas typically follow a pattern of dry winters with occasional snow, a wet spring and autumn that are often accompanied by thunderstorms and severe weather, and humid summers.

Climate data for Cleburne, Texas (1991–2020 normals, extremes 1907–present)
Month	Jan	Feb	Mar	Apr	May	Jun	Jul	Aug	Sep	Oct	Nov	Dec	Year
Record high °F (°C)	90 (32)	98 (37)	101 (38)	102 (39)	107 (42)	113 (45)	112 (44)	112 (44)	114 (46)	104 (40)	92 (33)	93 (34)	114 (46)
Mean maximum °F (°C)	78.2 (25.7)	82.1 (27.8)	87.0 (30.6)	90.0 (32.2)	94.6 (34.8)	98.8 (37.1)	102.2 (39.0)	103.5 (39.7)	99.4 (37.4)	92.6 (33.7)	84.1 (28.9)	78.6 (25.9)	104.4 (40.2)
Mean daily maximum °F (°C)	56.8 (13.8)	61.0 (16.1)	68.2 (20.1)	76.2 (24.6)	82.7 (28.2)	90.4 (32.4)	94.8 (34.9)	95.3 (35.2)	88.6 (31.4)	78.4 (25.8)	66.9 (19.4)	58.4 (14.7)	76.5 (24.7)
Daily mean °F (°C)	45.1 (7.3)	49.0 (9.4)	56.3 (13.5)	64.4 (18.0)	72.3 (22.4)	80.1 (26.7)	83.6 (28.7)	83.7 (28.7)	77.1 (25.1)	66.4 (19.1)	55.2 (12.9)	47.0 (8.3)	65.0 (18.3)
Mean daily minimum °F (°C)	33.3 (0.7)	37.1 (2.8)	44.5 (6.9)	52.5 (11.4)	61.9 (16.6)	69.9 (21.1)	72.5 (22.5)	72.2 (22.3)	65.7 (18.7)	54.4 (12.4)	43.5 (6.4)	35.5 (1.9)	53.6 (12.0)
Mean minimum °F (°C)	19.7 (−6.8)	23.3 (−4.8)	28.2 (−2.1)	37.2 (2.9)	47.3 (8.5)	61.2 (16.2)	67.0 (19.4)	65.7 (18.7)	53.0 (11.7)	37.9 (3.3)	27.6 (−2.4)	21.9 (−5.6)	16.6 (−8.6)
Record low °F (°C)	−3 (−19)	−1 (−18)	11 (−12)	25 (−4)	34 (1)	49 (9)	57 (14)	51 (11)	30 (−1)	20 (−7)	12 (−11)	−5 (−21)	−5 (−21)
Average precipitation inches (mm)	2.61 (66)	2.52 (64)	3.47 (88)	3.08 (78)	4.27 (108)	3.90 (99)	2.11 (54)	2.83 (72)	3.02 (77)	4.43 (113)	2.92 (74)	2.53 (64)	37.69 (957)
Average snowfall inches (cm)	0.3 (0.76)	0.3 (0.76)	0.0 (0.0)	0.0 (0.0)	0.0 (0.0)	0.0 (0.0)	0.0 (0.0)	0.0 (0.0)	0.0 (0.0)	0.0 (0.0)	0.0 (0.0)	0.2 (0.51)	0.8 (2.0)
Average precipitation days (≥ 0.01 in)	6.2	5.9	6.9	5.7	7.5	5.7	4.5	5.0	4.8	6.3	5.9	5.7	70.1
Average snowy days (≥ 0.1 in)	0.4	0.4	0.0	0.0	0.0	0.0	0.0	0.0	0.0	0.0	0.1	0.2	1.1
Source: NOAA

== Demographics ==
2020 Racial/Ethnic composition (Note: Note: the US Census treats Hispanic/Latino as an ethnic category. This table excludes Latinos from the racial categories and assigns them to a separate category. Hispanics/Latinos can be of any race.)
Race	Number	Percentage
White	21,538	68.7%
Black or African American	1,275	4.1%
American Indian and Alaska Native	333	1.1%
Asian	185	0.6%
Native Hawaiian and other Pacific Islander	382	1.2%
Some other race	3,866	12.3%
Two or more races	3,773	12.0%
Hispanics or Latinos (of any race)	9,361	29.9%

Historical population
Census	Pop.	Note	%±
1870	686		—
1880	1,855		170.4%
1890	3,278		76.7%
1900	7,493		128.6%
1910	10,364		38.3%
1920	12,820		23.7%
1930	11,539		−10.0%
1940	10,558		−8.5%
1950	12,905		22.2%
1960	15,381		19.2%
1970	16,015		4.1%
1980	19,218		20.0%
1990	22,205		15.5%
2000	26,005		17.1%
2010	29,337		12.8%
2020	31,352		6.9%
2025 (est.)	39,942		27.4%

Cleburne has seen consistent growth in population since the 1870 census, with the exception being the 1930s and '40s during the Great Depression. According to the 2020 census, 31,352 people and 11,145 households resided in Cleburne, with 2.90 persons per household, and travel 25.4 minutes on average to work. About 26.5% of the population were 18 and under, and 14.6% were 65 and over. Females made up 49.5% of the population. The population density was 878.3 inhabitants per square mile (339.1/km^{2}). The median household income was $70,656 and the per capita income was $32,059. About 10% of the population was living below the poverty line. Of the city's population over 25, 20.3% held a bachelor's degree or higher, and 84.7% had a high-school diploma or equivalent. Some 1,519 veterans lived in Cleburne; 7.4% of the population were foreign-born.

Religion in Cleburne and the wider county is predominantly Christian. Some of the larger denominations are Southern Baptist, Seventh-day Adventist, United Methodist, Assemblies of God, Churches of Christ, Cumberland Presbyterian, Catholic, Church of Jesus Christ of Latter-day Saints, and Jehovah's Witnesses. A large number fall under nondenominational Christians.

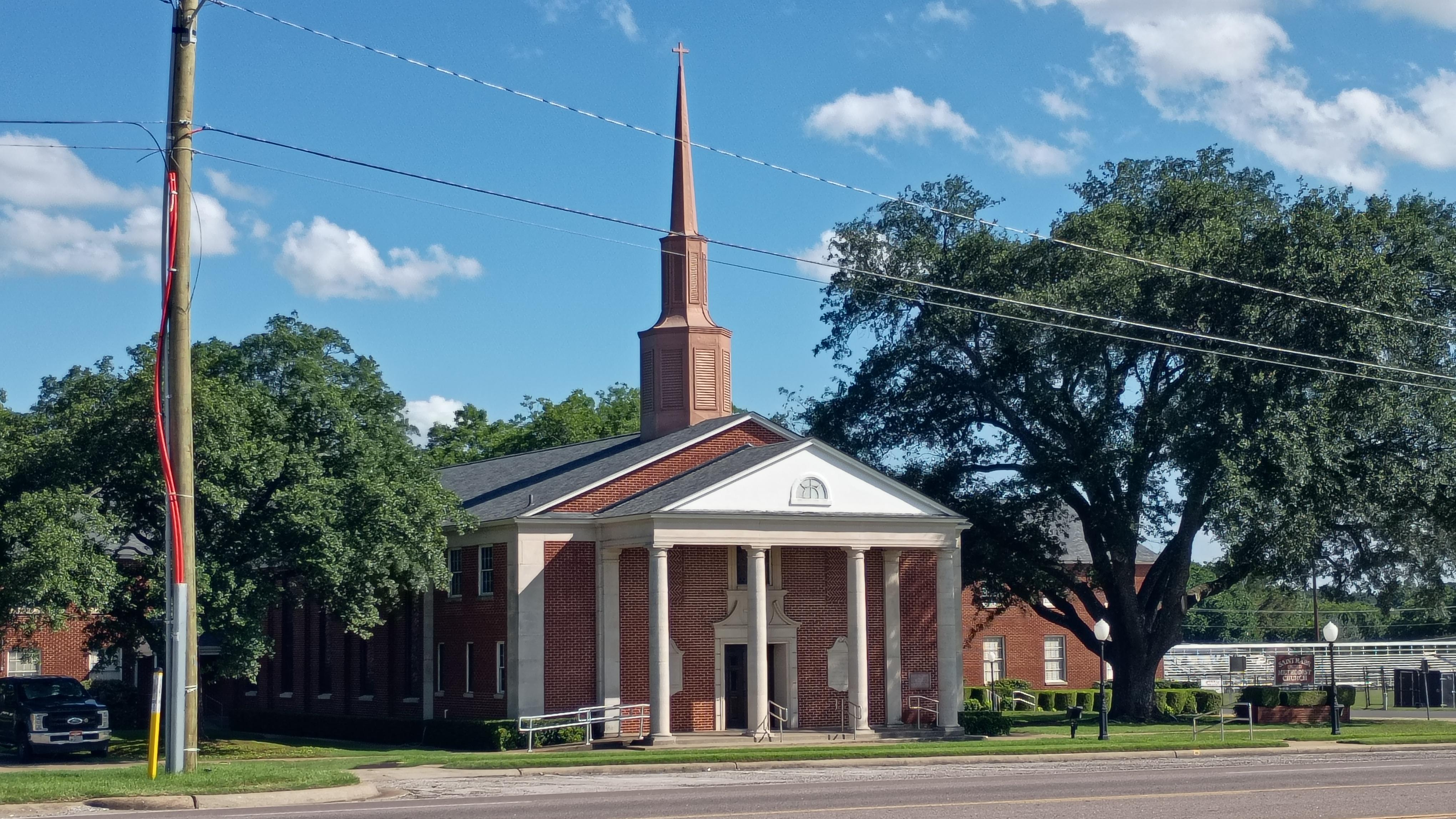
St Mark United Methodist Church

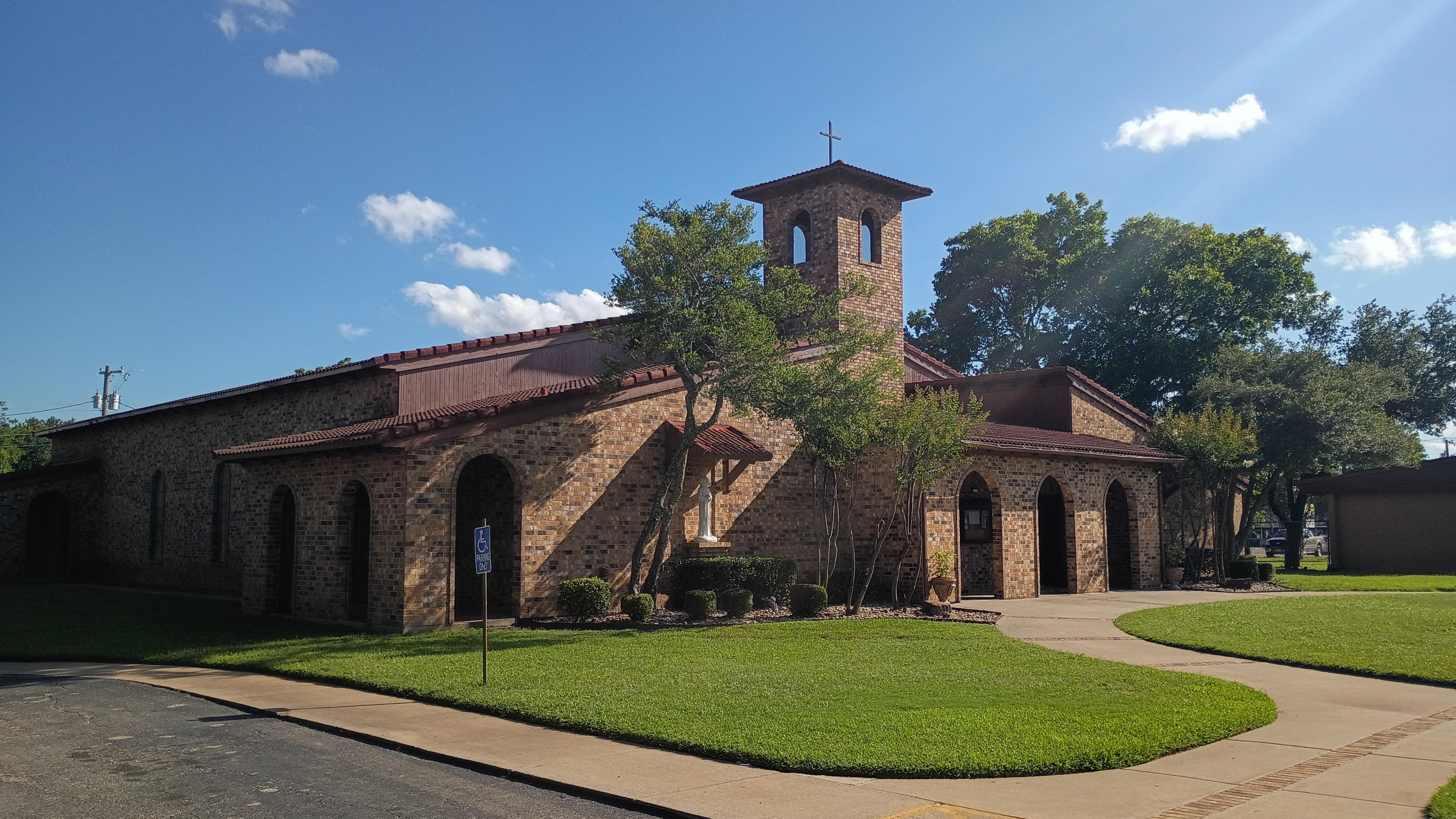
Saint Joseph Catholic Church

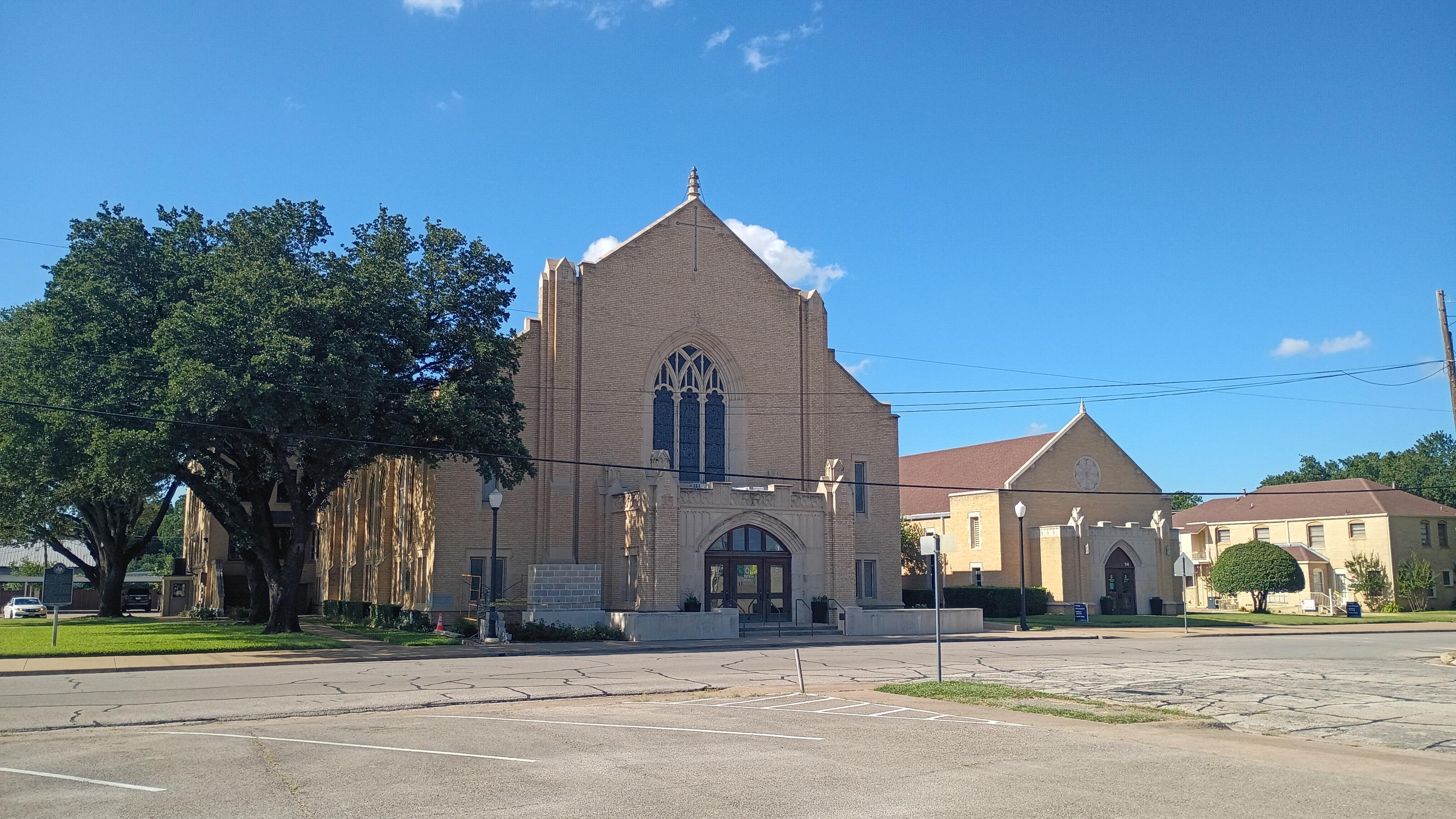
First Baptist Cleburne

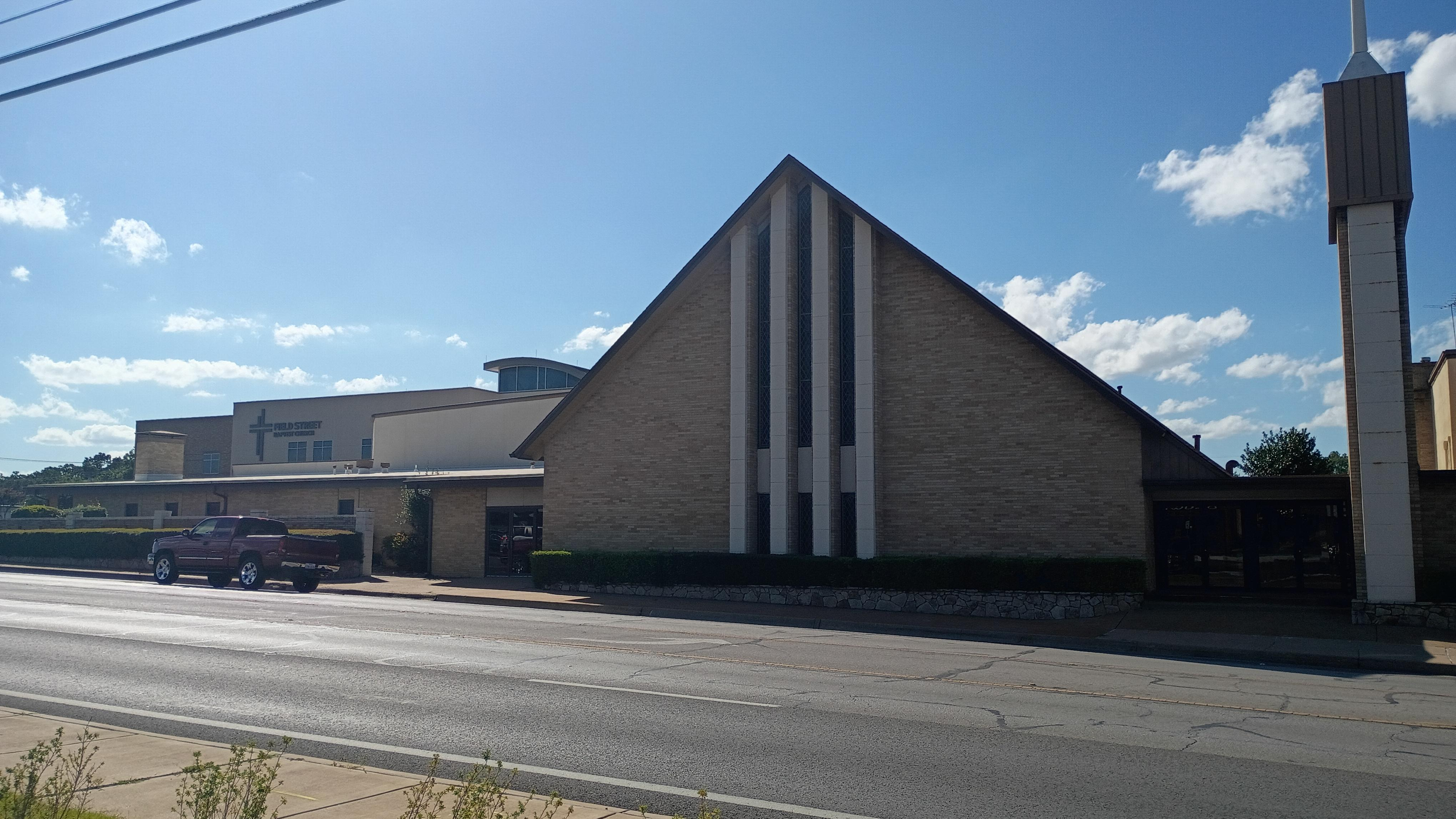
Field Street Baptist Church

== Economy ==
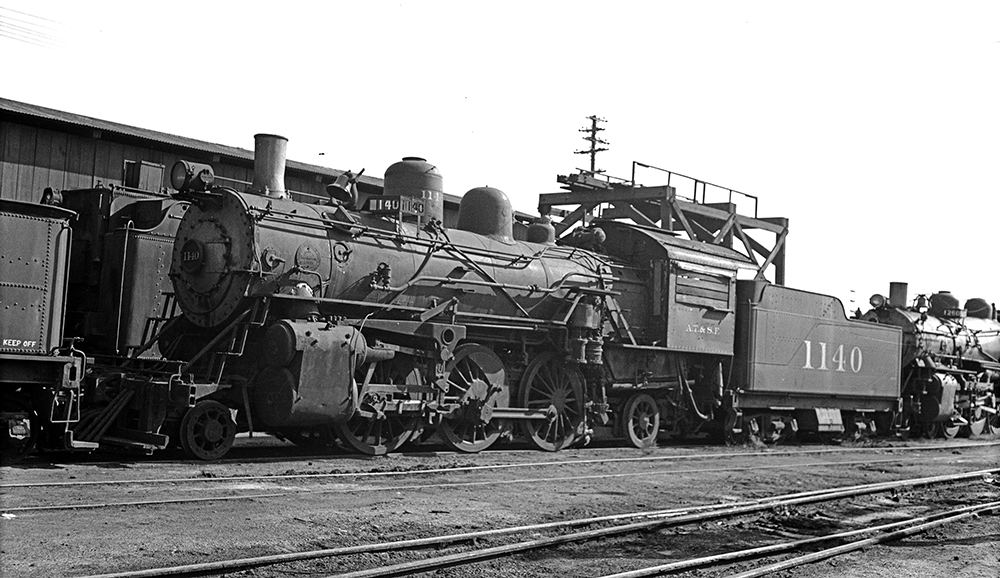
Locomotive No. 1140 in Cleburne

Cleburne's early economy was predominantly agricultural until the arrival of the railroad in 1879. The Santa Fe shops were opened in 1898 by Atchison, Topeka and Santa Fe Railway and were the largest employer in the city for over a century.

The industrial sector provides many jobs in Cleburne. The major employers are the Walmart Distribution Center, Johns Manville Corp, James Hardie Industries, Technical Chemical Company, Wabash National, Tutle and Tutle Trucking, the Greenbrier Companies, Tech Light Mfg., Sachem Inc., and Rangaire Mfg. Other major employers include the Walmart Super Center, Cleburne ISD, Johnson County, Texas Health Harris Methodist Hospital, City of Cleburne, and Hill College. More recent additions to the job market include Amazon, who are building a warehouse by the Chisholm Trail Parkway. La Moderna, a pasta manufacturer, opened a new facility in 2018 and is the current sponsor of the baseball field at Cleburne Station. FasTrac Construction Products, Terra CO2 Technology, and Stillwell Inc. have recently opened new facilities in Cleburne as well.

== Arts and culture ==
=== Theater and performing arts ===
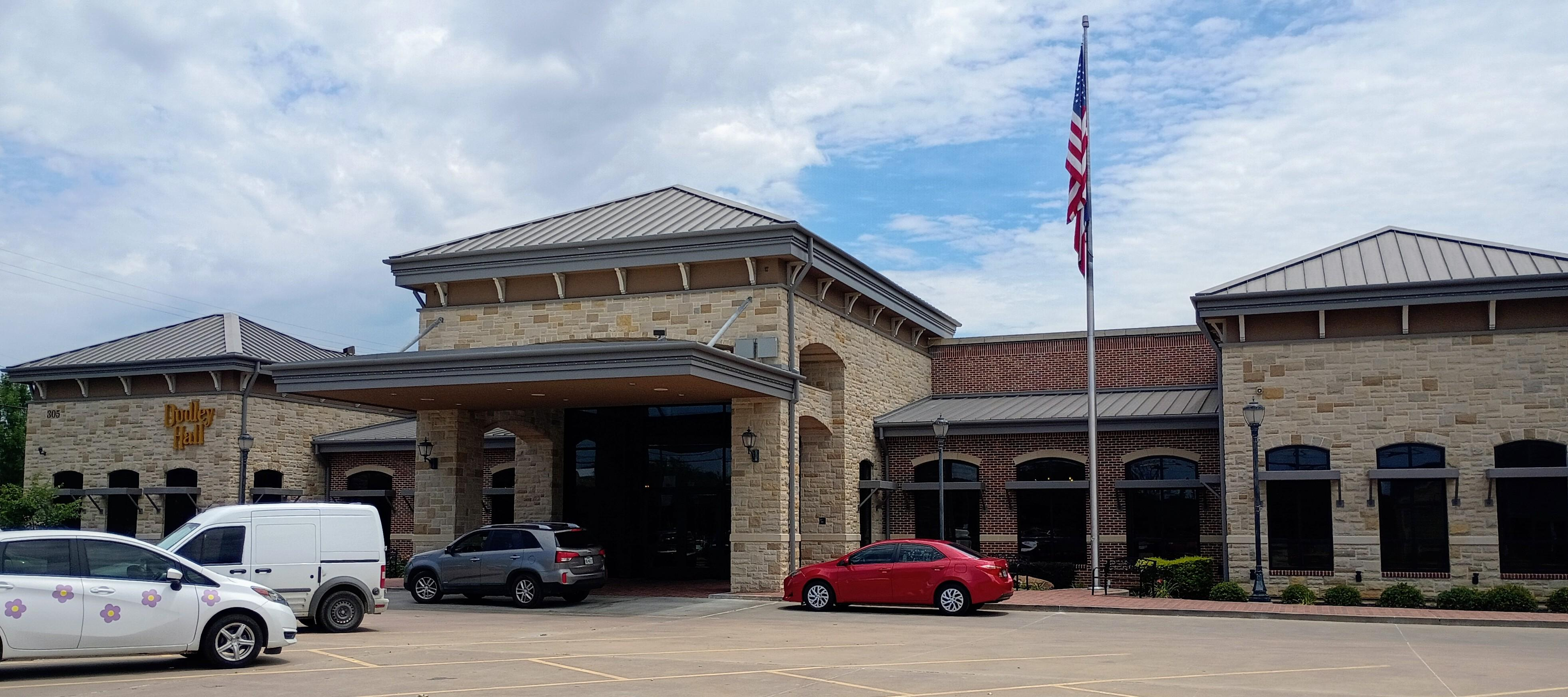
Dudley Hall

Cleburne's historic downtown includes two theaters: Plaza Main Street Theatre and Dudley Hall; the latter hosts family-friendly musicals and comedies performed by the award-winning Plaza Theatre Company, which was founded in November 2006 by the Downtown Cleburne Association. The Plaza Main Street Theatre hosts the Plaza Academy, a youth offshoot of the Plaza Theatre Company. Songbird Live, which offers live music, is also within the historic downtown.

Within the Cleburne conference center is the Helmcamp Community Theatre stage, which hosts the Greater Cleburne Carnegie Players. Formed in 1980, the Carnegie Players performed in the top-floor theater of the Cleburne Carnegie Library (now the Layland Museum) until 2010. That summer, they relocated to the conference center.

=== Museums ===
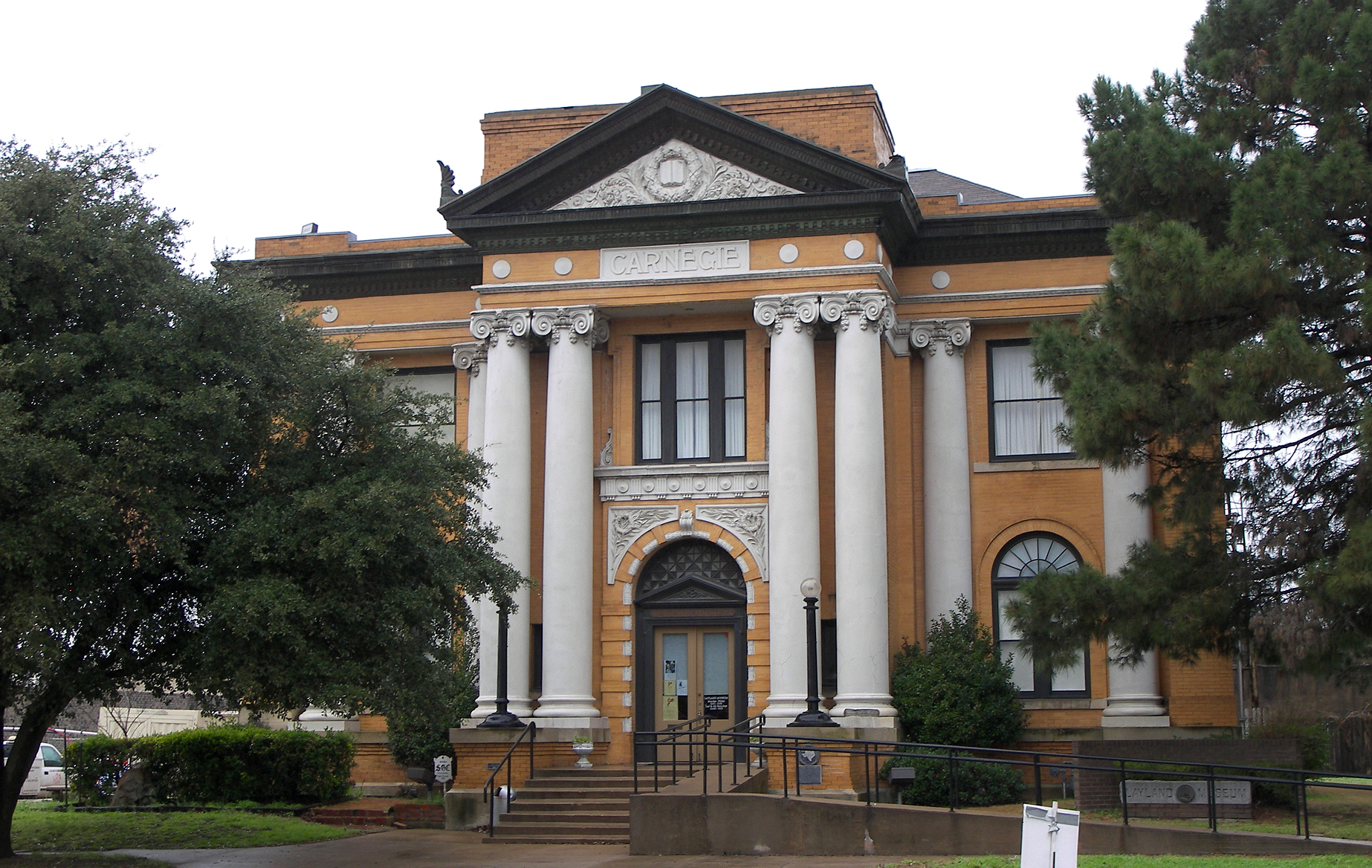
Layland Museum

The city of Cleburne manages both the Layland Museum of History and the Cleburne Railroad Museum. The Layland gallery is located in the Cleburne Carnegie Building. These galleries include first peoples, settlers, and 20th-century sections containing over 50,000 artifacts and 100,000 photos. The Lowell Smith History Center holds the research library and a kitchen classroom. The Cleburne Railroad Museum explores the history and influence of the railroads on the city through traditional and interactive exhibits. The museum contains a large model-train room and houses over 2000 railroad artifacts.

Other museums include the Johnson County Courthouse Museum, which preserves the history and artifacts of the county through the Johnson County Historical Commission. The J.N. Long Cultural Arts Center hosts various art workshops and galleries from local artists from the area. The Gone with the Wind Remembered Museum contains a comprehensive collection from the movie, as well as period pieces expounding on the history surrounding the story.

The Chisholm Trail Outdoor Museum showcases the history of the Chisholm Trail, Johnson County, and the pioneer life of the 19th century. The attractions in the museum include the Big Bear Native American Museum, a blacksmiths shop, a restored stagecoach, the 1855 Johnson County Log Courthouse, the Douglas Harman Chisholm Trail Artifacts and Western Memorabilia Museum, a historic mule barn, a replica of the Wardville cemetery now under Lake Pat Cleburne, Wardville Sheriff's Office and Jail, the Nolan River Schoolhouse, and the Terry Building.

=== Annual events ===
Antique Alley occurs every April and September, showcasing over 500 antique dealers along the highways around Johnson, Hill, and Ellis Counties. The western edge includes the historic downtown in Cleburne. Spring Fest is held in April at the market square with live music, vendors, car show, and food trucks. Whistle Stop Christmas starts in late November through early January. Events include the lighting ceremony, Christmas parade, driving tour of lights, Candlewalk Tour of historic homes, and Cowboy Christmas on the trail. Pioneer Days is held in November at the Chisholm Train Outdoor Museum, celebrating the history of Texas and Cleburne.

== Sports ==
=== Cleburne Railroaders ===
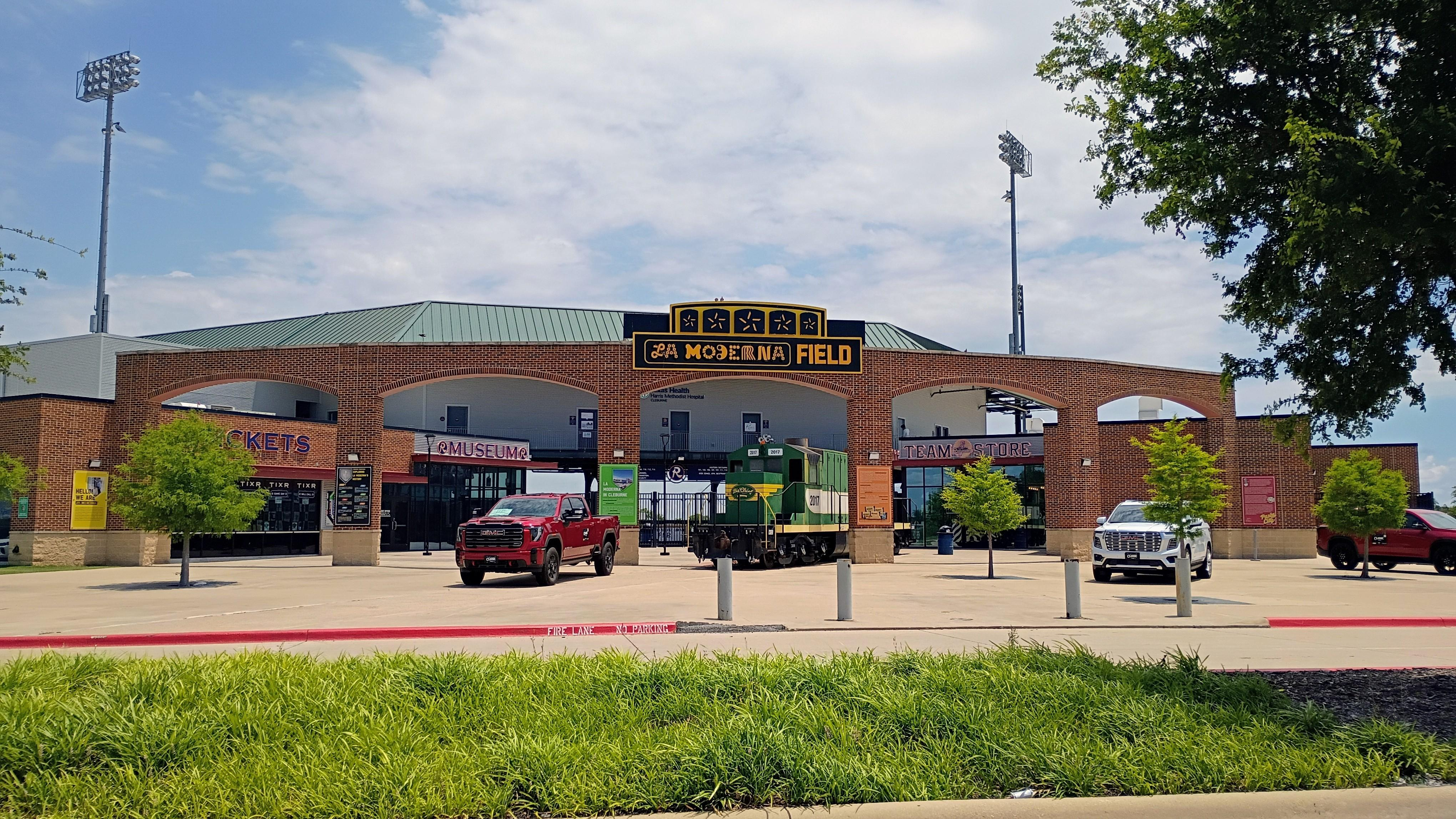
La Moderna Field

The Cleburne Railroaders baseball team plays in the American Association of Professional Baseball. The first iteration of the Railroaders won the Texas League championship in 1906. After disbanding the next season, a second iteration joined the Texas–Oklahoma League in 1911–1912. The Railroaders went on to win the 1911 championship. The modern Railroaders began playing starting from 2017 to the present. La Moderna Field serves as their home field.

=== Annual events ===
The Tour de Goatneck occurs on the last Saturday of July, hosting over 1,250 riders through the rolling hills of Johnson and Somervell Counties. The Johnson County Sheriff's Posse hosts a Professional Rodeo Cowboys Association rodeo. Competitions include bareback riding, saddle-bronco riding, steer wrestling, tie-down roping, team roping, and bull riding.

== Parks and recreation ==
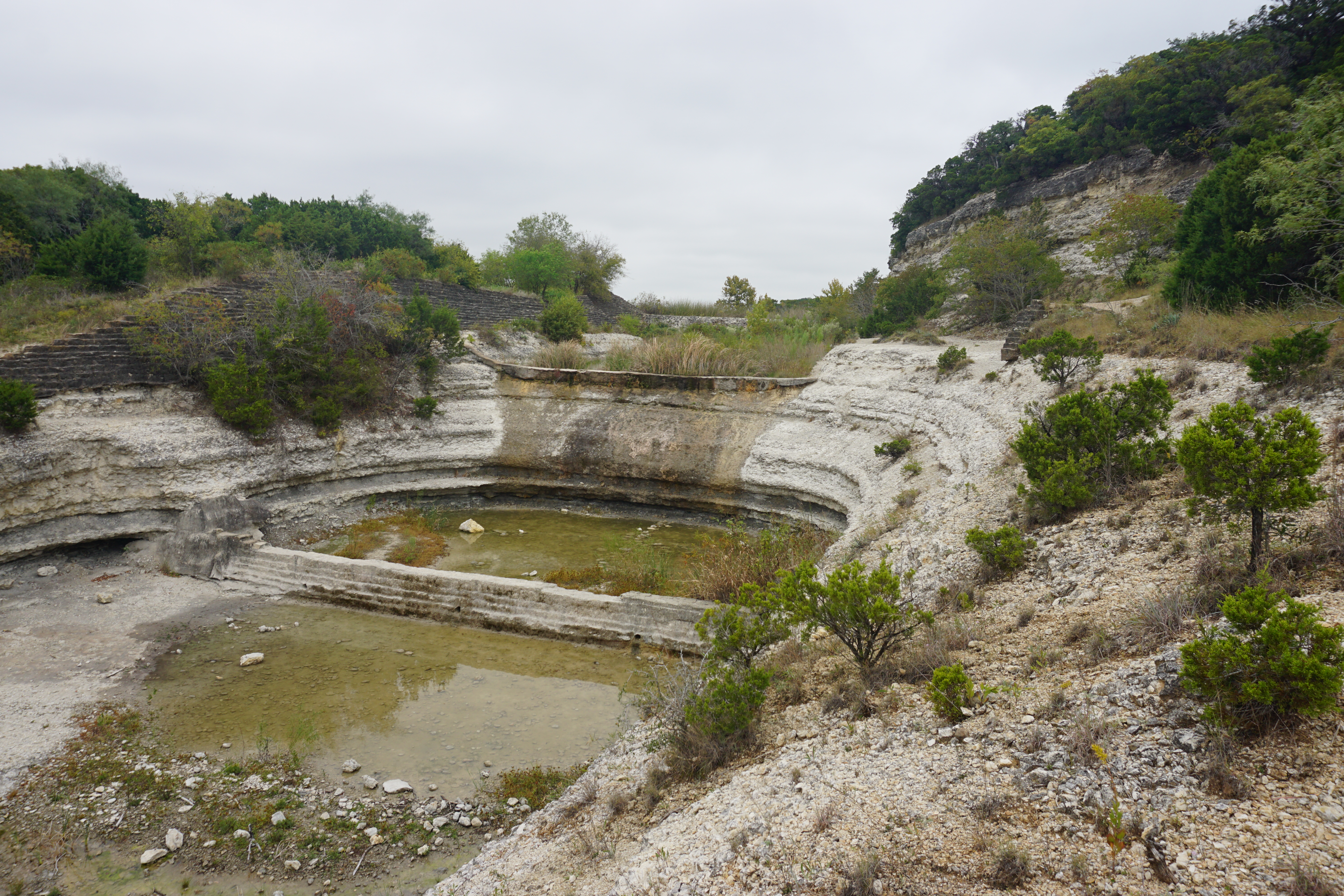
Cleburne State Park

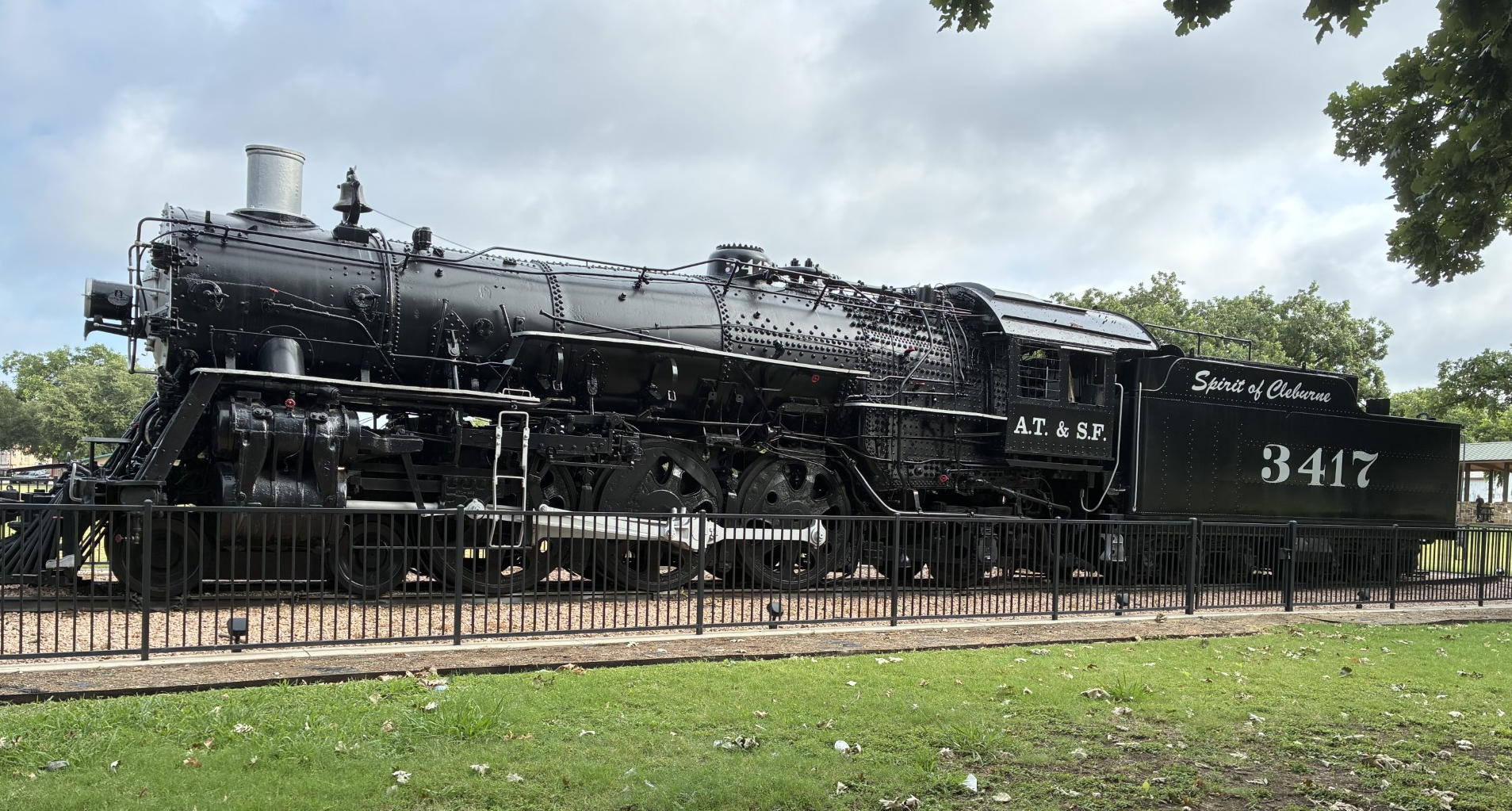
Spirit of Cleburne in Hulen Park

Cleburne Parks and Recreation maintains many parks, fields, and trails. Neighborhood parks include John P. Bradshaw Park, John S. Butner Park, P.D. Lacewell Park, J. E. Standley Park, Byron "Buddy" Stewart Park, Westhill Park, Winchester Park, and McAnear Park. The Buffalo Creek Parks provide trails along both the East and West Buffalo Creeks. Recreational facilities include the market square in downtown Cleburne and the Booker T. Washington Recreation Center near Carver Park. The John Warren Sports Complex provides seven lighted baseball/softball fields, twenty soccer fields, two football fields, 2 batting cages, and supporting facilities. The old sports complex is also nearby.

More notable parks include Carver Park, which rests along the East Buffalo Creek, providing several picnic areas, trails, a playground, a splash pad, and the lighted Carver Park Field. Hulen Park, a Lone Star Legacy Park, straddles the West Buffalo Creek. Amenities include pavilions, playgrounds, games, trails, a basketball court, a baseball/softball field, the lighted Don Moore Field, and Splash Station. Hulen park also hosts the Whistle Stop Christmas lighting display in December. The "Spirit of Cleburne" locomotive is present at the Hulen Park, as well. Lakeshore Park borders Lake Pat Cleburne, providing great views of the lake. Winston Patrick McGregor Park showcases native plants with walking paths, a pavilion, a pond, and a children's area.

Cleburne State Park, operated by Texas Parks & Wildlife, sits southwest of Cleburne. The park encompasses 528 acres of limestone ridges and dense thickets with Cedar Lake at its center. Many trails and campsites are found alongside projects built by the Civilian Conservation Corp.

== Government and public safety ==
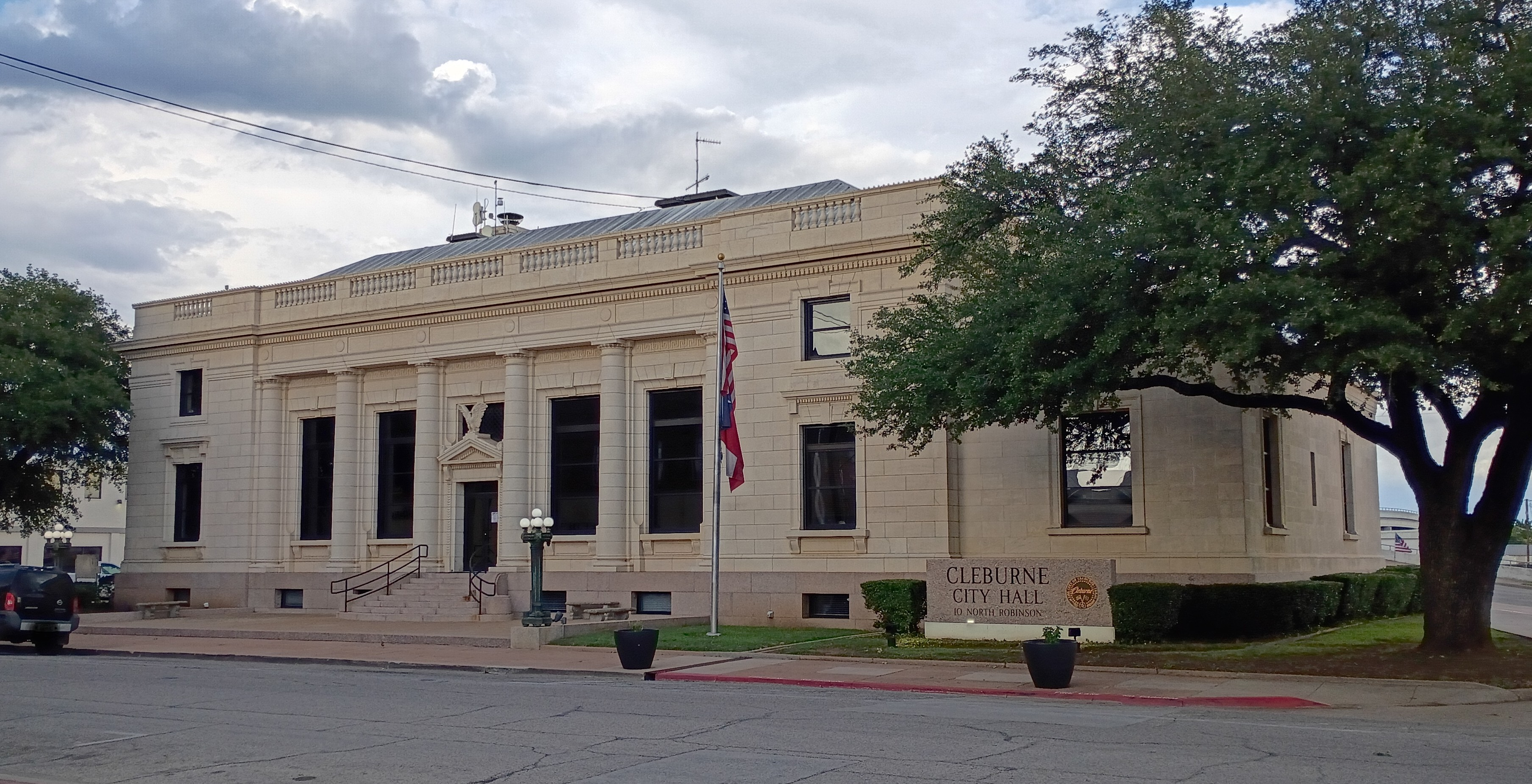
Cleburne City Hall

Cleburne operates under a council-manager system of government. The mayor and council are responsible for legislative functions, while the city manager handles operations. The current city manager is Michael Marrero. The mayor of Cleburne is Derek Weathers. Council members include Mark Wickey, Blake Jones, Oliver Cozby, and Diana Weaver. Cleburne also serves as the county seat of Johnson County. The Guinn Justice Center holds the 18th, 249th, and 413th District Courts, and County Courts-at-Law 1 and 2

The Cleburne Police Department, a full-service police agency with 56 sworn officers, serves the city of Cleburne and currently holds a best-practices accreditation from the Texas Police Chiefs Association Foundation. The Cleburne Fire Department operates out of three fire stations and an administration building. CFD has been recognized with an ISO class 1 public protection classification as of 2025.

== Education ==
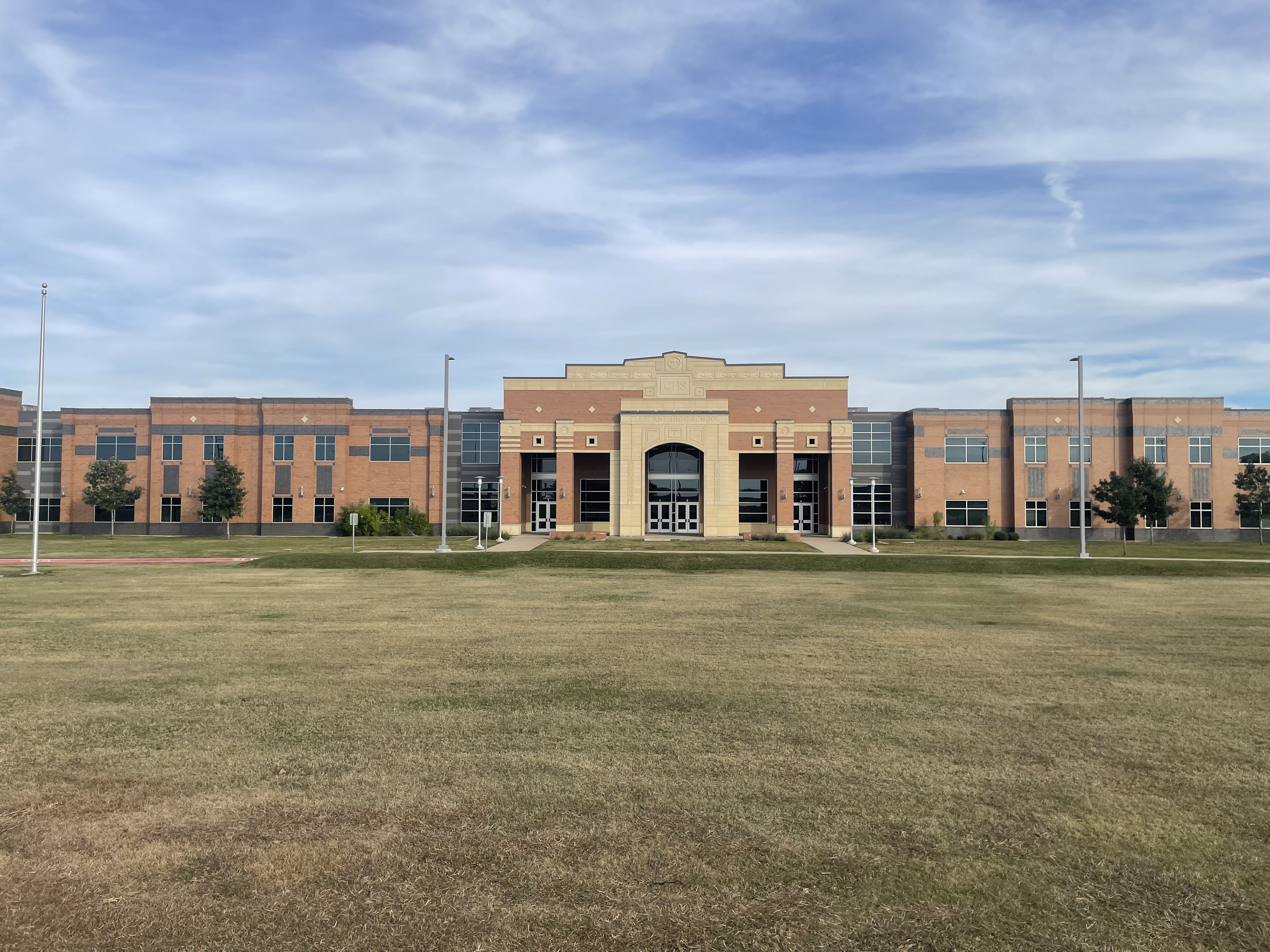
Cleburne High School

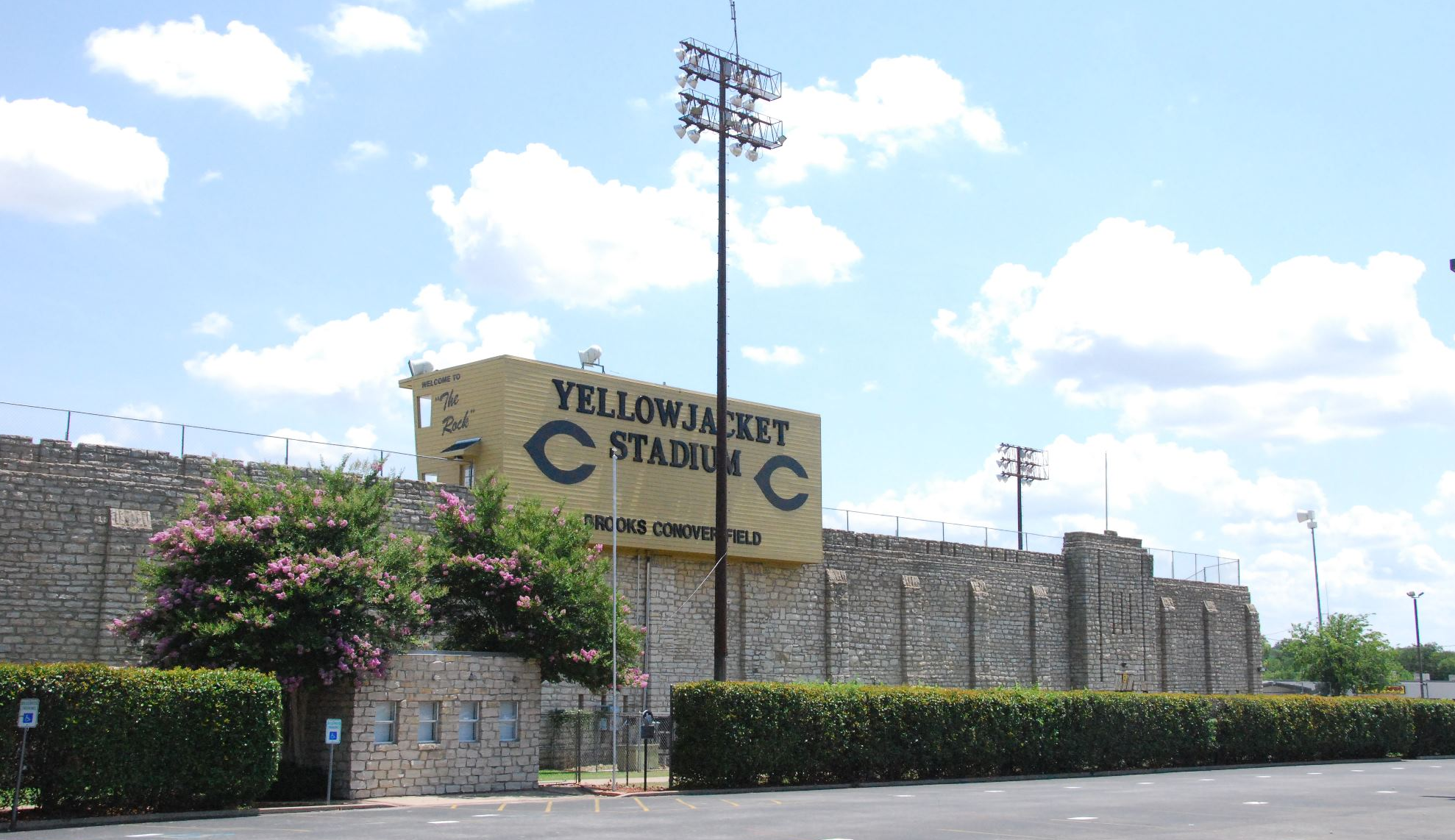
Yellow Jacket Stadium

Cleburne is served by the Cleburne Independent School District. Elementary schools include Adams, Coleman, Cooke, Gerard, Irving, Marti, and Santa Fe. Middle schools include Smith Intermediate and Wheat Middle School. TEAM school serves as an alternate to the high school, and Phoenix serves as a disciplinary school. Cleburne High School provides CTE programs, fine arts, and athletic programs. The fine arts department offers art, band, choir, dance, and theater. The athletics department includes baseball, basketball, cheer leading, cross-country, football, golf, power lifting, soccer, softball, swimming, tennis, track and field, and volleyball. CISD also maintains Yellow Jacket Stadium, a Texas Historic Landmark, where football and other sports are played.

Cleburne Christian Academy is a private school that offers prekindergarten-grade 12 classes. Hill College manages a Johnson County campus in Cleburne that offers two-year associate's degrees and workforce certifications. The city operates a public library near the downtown core along the West Buffalo Creek.

== Media ==
Cleburne's primary daily newspaper is the Cleburne Times-Review, operating since 1934. Prior to 1934, it was published under the name Cleburne Morning-Review since 1905. Defunct newspapers include the Cleburne Chronicle (1868–1916) and Cleburne Daily Enterprise (1895–1933).

Cleburne is part of the Dallas–Fort Worth media market. TV stations include KDTN (Daystar), KLHP-LD (TCT), KDFW (Fox 4), KXAS-TV (NBC 5), KXTX-TV (Telemundo), K26KC-D (TBN), WFAA (ABC), K07AAF-D (HSN), KTVT (CBS), KERA-TV (PBS), KHFD-LD (Newsmax2), KUVN-DT (Univision 23), KDTX-TV (TBN), and KPXD-TV (ION).

Cleburne receives signals from 62 FM and 40 AM stations. Music stations include KDMX (hot adult contemporary), KDGE (alternative), KLNO (Spanish classic hits), KJKK (adult hits), KVIL (alternative), KHKS (top 40/contemporary hits), KSPF (classic hits), KLTY (Christian contemporary), KKDA (urban), KZPS (classic rock), KMVK (regional Mexican), KCBI (Christian contemporary), KBFB (urban), KDXX (Spanish hits), KEGL (rock), WRR (classical), and KPLX (country).

== Transportation ==
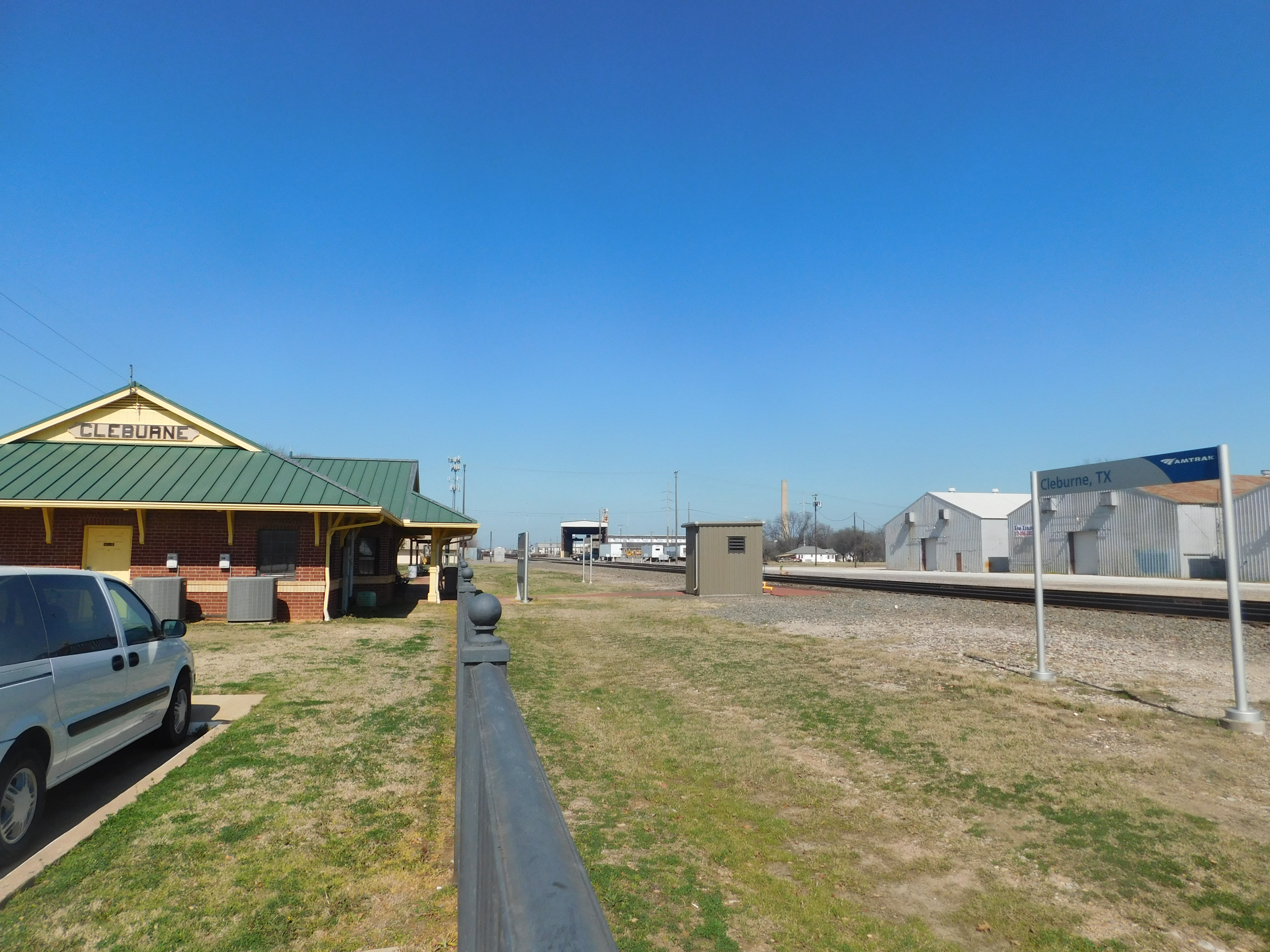
Cleburne Amtrak Station

Cleburne Regional Airport (KCPT) is a 440-acre city-owned, public-use airport with a single asphalt runway stretching 5,697 by 100 feet with fuel services provided on demand. Amtrak's Texas Eagle runs from Chicago to San Antonio and includes a stop at the Cleburne station (CBR). The City/County Transportation (CCT) bus service includes a stop at the station, as well. CCT provides demand-response, curb-to-curb service throughout Johnson County (excluding Burleson). TXDOT maintains several roadways in Cleburne, including Farm to Market Road 4, Texas State Highway 174, US Route 67, Henderson St (US 67 BR), Chambers St (US 67 BR), Caddo St (SH 174 N), and Main St (SH 174 S).

== Notable people ==
- William H. Bledsoe, a member of both houses of Texas Legislature from Lubbock, 1915 to 1929
- Johnny Carroll, a rockabilly singer, recorded for Sun Records, Decca Records, and Warner Bros.
- Pat Culpepper, All-American linebacker for the University of Texas at Austin
- Donnie Dacus, former guitarist for Chicago
- Leonard Eugene Dickson, professor of mathematics at University of Chicago
- Dillon Gee, pitcher for the New York Mets and others
- Joe Keeble, football player
- David "Benedict" McWilliams, a former player and head football coach of the University of Texas at Austin
- Spike Owen, a former Major League Baseball shortstop
- Derrell Palmer, a 1950s Cleveland Browns lineman
- Randy Rogers, singer and front man of Randy Rogers Band
- Del Sharbutt, radio and television announcer, songwriter, and composer
- Barbara Staff, co-chair of the 1976 Ronald Reagan presidential campaign in Texas
- Montey Stevenson, former professional football defensive tackle
- Anne Stratton, composer
- Claude Porter White, composer

== See also ==
- List of museums in North Texas
- National Register of Historic Places listings in Johnson County, Texas
- List of Recorded Texas Historic Landmarks (Hunt-Martin)
- Cross Timbers (in western Cleburne)
- Texas Blackland Prairies (in eastern Cleburne)
- Brazos River (drainage basin that Cleburne is in)
