= Granbury micropolitan area =

- Micropolitan Statistical Area
- Granbury, TX Micropolitan Statistical Area
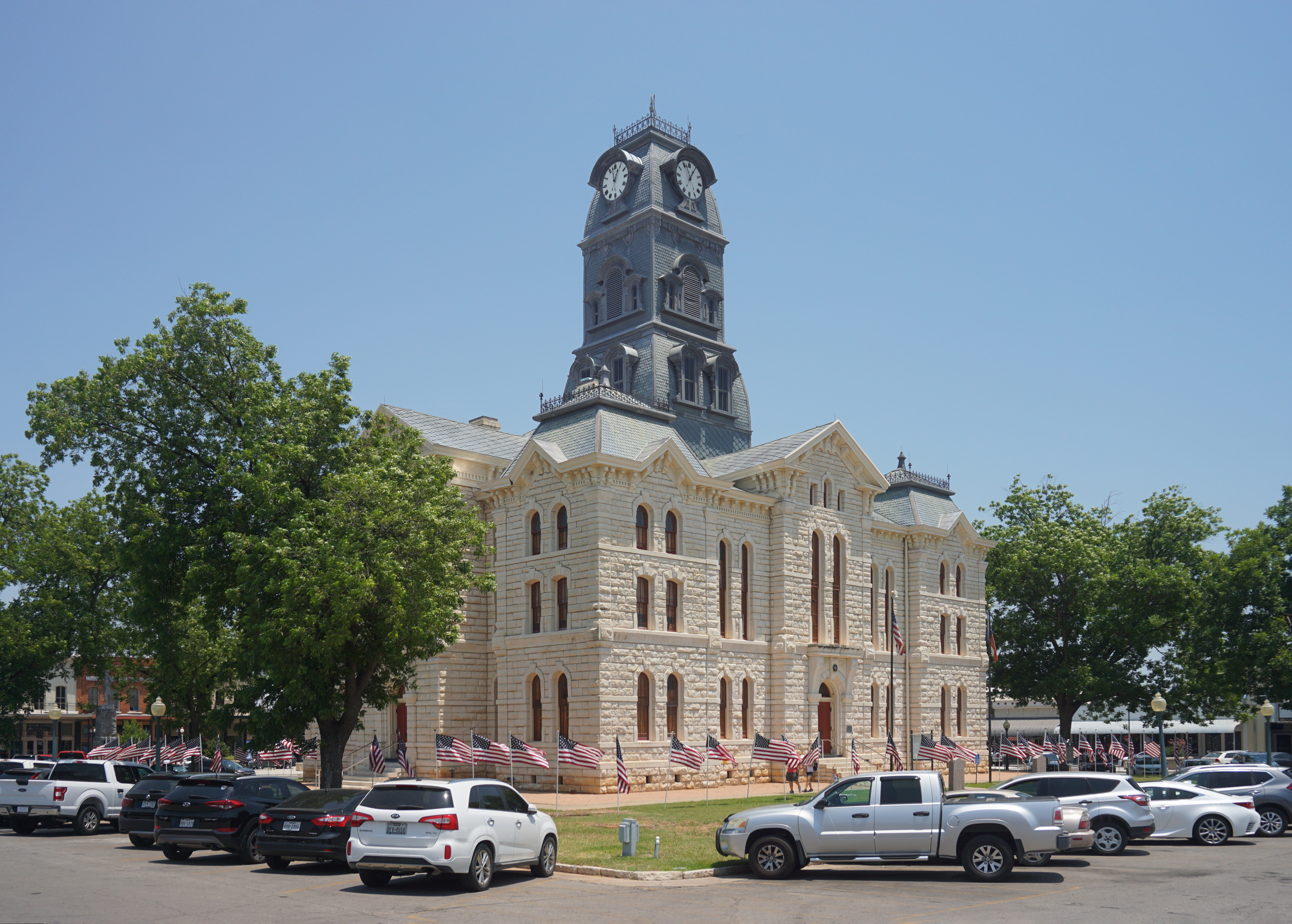
- Hood County Courthouse in 2018
Interactive Map of Granbury, TX μSA
City of Granbury
Granbury, TX μSA
Other Counties in the Dallas–Fort Worth CSA
- Country: United States
- State: Texas
- Time zone: UTC-6 (CST)
  - Summer (DST): UTC-5 (CDT)

The Granbury micropolitan statistical area, as defined by the United States Census Bureau, is an area consisting of one counties in North Central Texas, anchored by the city of Granbury.

As of the 2000 census, the area had a population of 47,909 (a July 1, 2009, estimate placed the population at 59,493).

== Counties ==
- Hood

== Communities ==
- Incorporated places
  - Brazos Bend
  - Cresson (partial)
  - DeCordova
  - Granbury (Principal city)
  - Lipan
  - Tolar
- Census-designated places
  - Oak Trail Shores
  - Pecan Plantation
- Unincorporated places
  - Acton
  - Paluxy
  - Thorp Spring (founding location, 1873, of AddRan Male & Female College, now Texas Christian University)

== Demographics ==
As of the census of 2000, 47,909 people, 18,614 households, and 13,939 families were residing within the area. Its racial makeup was 94.41% White, 0.32% African American, 0.81% Native American, 0.34% Asian or Pacific Islander, 2.79% from other races, and 1.34% from two or more races. Hispanics or Latinos of any race were 8.12% of the population.

The median income for a household in the area was $41,536, and for a family was $48,285. Males had a median income of $35,563 versus $23,552 for females. The per capita income for the μSA was $20,314.

== Major highways ==
- U.S. Highway 67
- U.S. Highway 377
- State Highway 144

== Education ==
These school districts serve the Granbury micropolitan area:

- Bluff Dale ISD (mostly in Erath County)
- Godley ISD (mostly in Johnson County, small portion in Tarrant County)
- Granbury ISD (small portion in Johnson, Parker counties)
- Lipan ISD (small portion in Erath, Palo Pinto, and Parker counties)
- Tolar ISD

== See also ==
- Texas census statistical areas
- List of Texas metropolitan areas
- List of cities in Texas
