= DeCordova, Texas =

- City
- Nickname: Millennium City
- Location of DeCordova, Texas
- Country: United States
- State: Texas
- County: Hood

Area
  - Total: 1.62 sq mi (4.19 km^{2})
  - Land: 1.41 sq mi (3.65 km^{2})
  - Water: 0.21 sq mi (0.54 km^{2})
- Elevation: 755 ft (230 m)

Population (2020)
  - Total: 3,007
  - Density: 2,130/sq mi (824/km^{2})
- Time zone: UTC-6 (Central (CST))
  - Summer (DST): UTC-5 (CDT)
- ZIP code: 76049
- Area codes: 817, 682
- FIPS code: 48-19570
- GNIS feature ID: 2410309
- Website: citydecordovatx.org

DeCordova is an unincorporated city in Hood County, Texas, United States. As of the US 2020 Census, it had a population of 3,007.

It is a gated residential community located on Lake Granbury, 6 miles (10 km) east-southeast of Granbury, and is part of the Granbury, Texas Micropolitan Statistical Area.

== History ==
DeCordova Bend Estates started being developed at the same time as the De Cordova Bend Dam in the late 1960s. The dam, built on the Brazos River to control the flow downstream, formed Lake Granbury. The new community was intended to serve as a weekend recreational getaway for residents of the Dallas/Fort Worth Metroplex. It is an all-age residential community 34 miles (55 km) southwest of Fort Worth. It has a recently renovated clubhouse, 27 holes of golf, marina, swimming pool, tennis, fitness center and other amenities. DeCordova was named after Jacob Raphael De Cordova, the land agent and colonizer. He was born in Spanish Town (near Kingston), Jamaica. De Cordova and Robert Creuzbaurqv compiled the Map of the State of Texas, first published in 1849.

The city of DeCordova incorporated on January 15, 2000, DeCordova was the first city in Texas to be incorporated after the turn of the century and claims the title of Texas' "Millennium City".

== Demographics ==
Historical population
Census	Pop.	Note	%±
2010	2,683		—
2020	3,007		12.1%
U.S. Decennial Census; 2020 Census

=== 2020 census ===
As of the 2020 census, DeCordova had a population of 3,007. The median age was 59.2 years. 15.4% of residents were under the age of 18 and 38.9% of residents were 65 years of age or older. For every 100 females there were 87.9 males, and for every 100 females age 18 and over there were 87.0 males age 18 and over.

100.0% of residents lived in urban areas, while 0.0% lived in rural areas.

There were 1,353 households in DeCordova, of which 18.7% had children under the age of 18 living in them. Of all households, 65.0% were married-couple households, 10.9% were households with a male householder and no spouse or partner present, and 21.8% were households with a female householder and no spouse or partner present. About 24.3% of all households were made up of individuals and 17.0% had someone living alone who was 65 years of age or older.

There were 1,533 housing units, of which 11.7% were vacant. The homeowner vacancy rate was 2.1% and the rental vacancy rate was 12.3%.

Racial composition as of the 2020 census
Race	Number	Percent
White	2,768	92.1%
Black or African American	8	0.3%
American Indian and Alaska Native	13	0.4%
Asian	17	0.6%
Native Hawaiian and Other Pacific Islander	1	0.0%
Some other race	28	0.9%
Two or more races	172	5.7%
Hispanic or Latino (of any race)	124	4.1%

== City government ==
The city has a mayor–council form of government and all city residents are members of the DeCordova Bend Estates Owners Association and the DeCordova Bend Estates Country Club.

The Granbury Independent School District serves area students. Students attend Acton Elementary, Acton Middle, and Granbury High school, all outside the city limits.
