= Canyon Creek, Hood County, Texas =

- Census-designated place
- Location within Texas Location within the United States
- Coordinates: 32°23′34″N 97°44′47″W
- Country: United States
- State: Texas
- County: Hood

Area
  - Total: 2.56 sq mi (6.64 km^{2})
  - Land: 2.36 sq mi (6.10 km^{2})
  - Water: 0.21 sq mi (0.54 km^{2})
- Elevation: 801 ft (244 m)

Population (2010)
  - Total: 916
  - Density: 389/sq mi (150.3/km^{2})
- Time zone: UTC-6 (Central (CST))
  - Summer (DST): UTC-5 (CDT)
- FIPS code: 48-12562
- GNIS feature ID: 2586915

Canyon Creek is an unincorporated community and census-designated place (CDP) in Hood County, Texas, United States. The population was 916 at the 2010 census. It is part of the Granbury micropolitan area as well as the Dallas–Fort Worth metroplex.

== Geography ==
Canyon Creek is in southeastern Hood County, on the south side of Lake Granbury, a reservoir on the Brazos River. It is 7 miles (11 km) southeast of Granbury, the county seat.

According to the United States Census Bureau, the CDP has a total area of 2.5 square miles (6.6 km^{2}), of which 2.4 square miles (6.1 km^{2}) are land and 0.2 square miles (0.5 km^{2}), or 8.16%, are water.

== Demographics ==
Historical population
Census	Pop.	Note	%±
2010	916		—
2020	1,249		36.4%
U.S. Decennial Census; 1850–1900 1910; 1920 1930 1940; 1950 1960 1970; 1980 1990 2000; 2010 2020

Canyon Creek first appeared as a census designated place in the 2010 U.S. census.

Canyon Creek CDP, Texas – Racial and ethnic composition Note: the US Census treats Hispanic/Latino as an ethnic category. This table excludes Latinos from the racial categories and assigns them to a separate category. Hispanics/Latinos may be of any race.
Race / Ethnicity (NH = Non-Hispanic)	Pop 2010	Pop 2020	% 2010	% 2020
White alone (NH)	747	1,011	81.55%	80.94%
Black or African American alone (NH)	8	9	0.87%	0.72%
Native American or Alaska Native alone (NH)	7	1	0.76%	0.08%
Asian alone (NH)	2	5	0.22%	0.40%
Native Hawaiian or Pacific Islander alone (NH)	0	0	0.00%	0.00%
Other race alone (NH)	3	15	0.33%	1.20%
Mixed race or Multiracial (NH)	15	59	1.64%	4.72%
Hispanic or Latino (any race)	134	149	14.63%	11.93%
Total	916	1,249	100.00%	100.00%
