= Pecan Plantation, Texas =

- Census-designated place
- Coordinates: 32°21′43″N 97°38′50″W
- Country: United States
- State: Texas
- Counties: Hood, Johnson

Area
  - Total: 7.6 sq mi (19.8 km^{2})
  - Land: 7.4 sq mi (19.2 km^{2})
  - Water: 0.23 sq mi (0.6 km^{2})
- Elevation: 722 ft (220 m)

Population (2020)
  - Total: 6,236
  - Density: 841/sq mi (325/km^{2})
- Time zone: UTC-6 (Central (CST))
  - Summer (DST): UTC-5 (CDT)
- FIPS code: 48-56498
- GNIS feature ID: 2409047

Pecan Plantation is an unincorporated community and census-designated place (CDP) in southeastern Hood County, Texas, United States. As of the 2020 census, Pecan Plantation had a population of 6,236. It is part of the Granbury, Texas, micropolitan statistical area.

== Geography ==
Pecan Plantation is located in southeastern Hood County. A small portion of the CDP extends east into Johnson County. The CDP occupies De Cordova Bend on the west side of the Brazos River, downstream from Lake Granbury. The dam for the reservoir impounds the Brazos at the northwestern corner of the CDP. The community is 12 miles (19 km) southeast of Granbury, the Hood County seat.

According to the United States Census Bureau, the CDP has a total area of 7.6 square miles (19.8 km^{2}), of which 0.2 sq mi (0.6 km^{2}), or 2.87%, is covered by water.

== History ==
Pecan Plantation features a 2,200-acre (890 ha) development that evolved around a two-runway cropdusting airstrip. The development retained the runways, allowing airpark homes with access to the runways.

== Demographics ==
Historical population
Census	Pop.	Note	%±
2000	3,544		—
2010	5,294		49.4%
2020	6,236		17.8%
U.S. Decennial Census; 1850–1900 1910; 1920 1930 1940; 1950 1960 1970; 1980 1990 2000; 2010

Pecan Plantation first appeared as a census designated place in the 2000 U.S. census.

=== 2020 census ===
Pecan Plantation CDP, Texas – Racial and ethnic composition Note: the US Census treats Hispanic/Latino as an ethnic category. This table excludes Latinos from the racial categories and assigns them to a separate category. Hispanics/Latinos may be of any race.
Race / Ethnicity (NH = Non-Hispanic)	Pop 2000	Pop 2010	Pop 2020	% 2000	% 2010	% 2020
White alone (NH)	3,406	5,046	5,672	96.11%	95.32%	90.96%
Black or African American alone (NH)	0	5	11	0.00%	0.09%	0.18%
Native American or Alaska Native alone (NH)	9	13	21	0.25%	0.25%	0.34%
Asian alone (NH)	15	31	42	0.42%	0.59%	0.67%
Native Hawaiian or Pacific Islander alone (NH)	2	5	5	0.06%	0.09%	0.08%
Other race alone (NH)	1	0	21	0.03%	0.00%	0.34%
Mixed race or Multiracial (NH)	25	25	174	0.71%	0.47%	2.79%
Hispanic or Latino (any race)	86	169	290	2.43%	3.19%	4.65%
Total	3,544	5,294	6,236	100.00%	100.00%	100.00%

As of the 2020 United States census, there were 6,236 people, 2,684 households, and 2,151 families residing in the CDP.

=== 2000 census ===
As of the census of 2000, 3,544 people, 1,475 households, and 1,299 families were residing in the CDP. The population density was 506.8 inhabitants per square mile (195.7/km^{2}). There were 1,568 housing units at an average density of 224.2 per square mile (86.6/km^{2}). The racial makeup of the CDP was 98.11% White, 0.17% African American, 0.25% Native American, 0.48% Asian or Pacific Islander, 0.28% from other races, and 0.71% from two or more races. Hispanics or Latinos of any race were 2.43% of the population.

Of the 1,475 households,22.4% had children under 18 living with them, 84.7% were married couples living together, 2.6% had a female householder with no husband present, and 11.9% were not families. About 10.4% of all households were made up of individuals, and 6.2% had someone living alone who was 65 years of age or older. The average household size was 2.40 and the average family size was 2.55.

In the CDP, th age distribution was 18.2% under 18, 2.3% from 18 to 24, 17.7% from 25 to 44, 36.0% from 45 to 64, and 25.8% who were 65 or older. The median age was 53 years. For every 100 females, there were 95.6 males. For every 100 females age 18 and over, there were 95.3 males.

The median income for a household in the CDP was $75,145, and for a family was $77,752. Males had a median income of $68,036 versus $37,188 for females. The per capita income for the CDP was $38,968. About 1.1% of families and 2.4% of the population were below the poverty line, including 7.7% of those under age 18 and none of those 65 or over.

== Education ==
Pecan Plantation is served by the Granbury Independent School District.
