= Paluxy, Texas =

Unincorporated community in Texas, US

Coordinates: 32°16′15″N 97°54′27″W

Paluxy is an unincorporated community in Hood County, Texas, United States.

The community is located on Farm to Market Road 51, 15 miles southwest of Granbury. It was part of Erath County until 1866, when Hood County was created.

Paluxy was named after the Paluxy River that runs through it. In 1887, the population of Paluxy was about 100. That figure rose to 164 in 1900, but steadily declined through the 20th century. Current estimates put the population at around 80.

The local newspaper is published in Granbury and area students attend school in nearby Tolar.

== See also ==
- Granbury micropolitan area
