= Arrowhead Shores, Texas =

Ghost town in Texas, US

Arrowhead Shores is an unincorporated community in Hood County, Texas, United States. Situated on Farm to Market Road 2580, it was founded after Lake Granbury's creation in 1969, but also contains an 1880s family cemetery. As of 2000, it had a population of 518.
