= Oak Trail Shores, Texas =

- Census-designated place
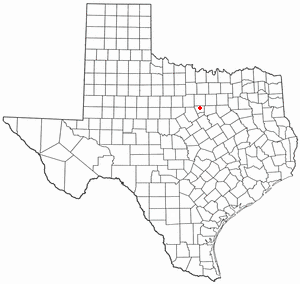
- Location of Oak Trail Shores, Texas

- Coordinates: 32°29′14″N 97°49′48″W
- Country: United States
- State: Texas
- County: Hood

Area
  - Total: 2.54 sq mi (6.58 km^{2})
  - Land: 2.54 sq mi (6.57 km^{2})
  - Water: 0.0039 sq mi (0.01 km^{2})
- Elevation: 807 ft (246 m)

Population (2020)
  - Total: 2,979
  - Density: 1,170/sq mi (453/km^{2})
- Time zone: UTC-6 (Central (CST))
  - Summer (DST): UTC-5 (CDT)
- ZIP code: 76048
- Area codes: 682 and 817
- FIPS code: 48-53212
- GNIS feature ID: 2408965

Oak Trail Shores is an unincorporated community and census-designated place (CDP) in Hood County, Texas, United States. As of the 2020 census, Oak Trail Shores had a population of 2,979. It is part of the Granbury micropolitan area as well as the Dallas–Fort Worth metroplex.

== Geography ==
Oak Trail Shores is in northern Hood County on the southwestern side of Lake Granbury, a reservoir on the Brazos River. It is 5 miles (8 km) northwest of Granbury, the county seat.

According to the United States Census Bureau, the CDP has a total area of 2.5 square miles (6.6 km^{2}), of which 0.004 square miles (0.01 km^{2}), or 0.16%, are water.

== Demographics ==
Historical population
Census	Pop.	Note	%±
1990	1,750		—
2000	2,475		41.4%
2010	2,755		11.3%
2020	2,979		8.1%
U.S. Decennial Census; 1850–1900 1910; 1920 1930 1940; 1950 1960 1970; 1980 1990 2000; 2010

Oak Trail Shores first appeared as a census designated place in the 1990 U.S. census.

=== 2020 census ===
Oak Trail Shores CDP, Texas – Racial and ethnic composition Note: the US Census treats Hispanic/Latino as an ethnic category. This table excludes Latinos from the racial categories and assigns them to a separate category. Hispanics/Latinos may be of any race.
Race / Ethnicity (NH = Non-Hispanic)	Pop 2000	Pop 2010	Pop 2020	% 2000	% 2010	% 2020
White alone (NH)	1,980	1,840	1,687	80.00%	66.79%	56.63%
Black or African American alone (NH)	19	23	26	0.77%	0.83%	0.87%
Native American or Alaska Native alone (NH)	17	19	18	0.69%	0.69%	0.60%
Asian alone (NH)	0	5	10	0.00%	0.18%	0.34%
Native Hawaiian or Pacific Islander alone (NH)	0	0	0	0.00%	0.00%	0.00%
Other race alone (NH)	1	10	8	0.04%	0.36%	0.27%
Mixed race or Multiracial (NH)	20	23	112	0.81%	0.83%	3.76%
Hispanic or Latino (any race)	438	835	1,118	17.70%	30.31%	37.53%
Total	2,475	2,755	2,979	100.00%	100.00%	100.00%

As of the 2020 United States census, there were 2,979 people, 1,066 households, and 671 families residing in the CDP.

=== 2000 census ===
As of the 2000 census, there were 2,475 people, 934 households, and 665 families in the CDP, with a population density of 984.8 people per square mile (380.7/km^{2}). There were 1,156 housing units at an average density of 460.0 per square mile (177.6/km^{2}). The CDP's racial makeup was 91.03% White, 0.77% African American, 0.81% Native American, 5.74% from other races, and 1.66% from two or more races. Hispanic or Latino of any race were 17.70% of the population.

There were 934 households, out of which 29.7% had children under the age of 18, 54.7% were married couples living together, 9.7% had a female householder with no husband present, and 28.8% were non-families. 23.7% of all households had one resident, and 9.1% had someone living alone who was 65 years of age or older. The average household size was 2.65 and the average family size was 3.09.

In the CDP, the population consisted of 25.9% under the age of 18, 7.5% from 18 to 24, 29.7% from 25 to 44, 21.6% from 45 to 64, and 15.3% who were 65 years of age and older. The median age was 36 years. For every 100 females, there were 101.5 males. For every 100 females age 18 and over, there were 104.8 males.

The median household income was $25,047, and the median family income $26,077. Median incomes were $24,250 for males and $11,538 for females. The per capita income was $11,665. About 14.6% of families and 18.5% of the population lived below the poverty line, including 27.3% of those under age 18 and 1.9% of those age 65 or over.

== Education ==
Oak Trail Shores is served by the Granbury Independent School District.
