= Lipan, Texas =

- City
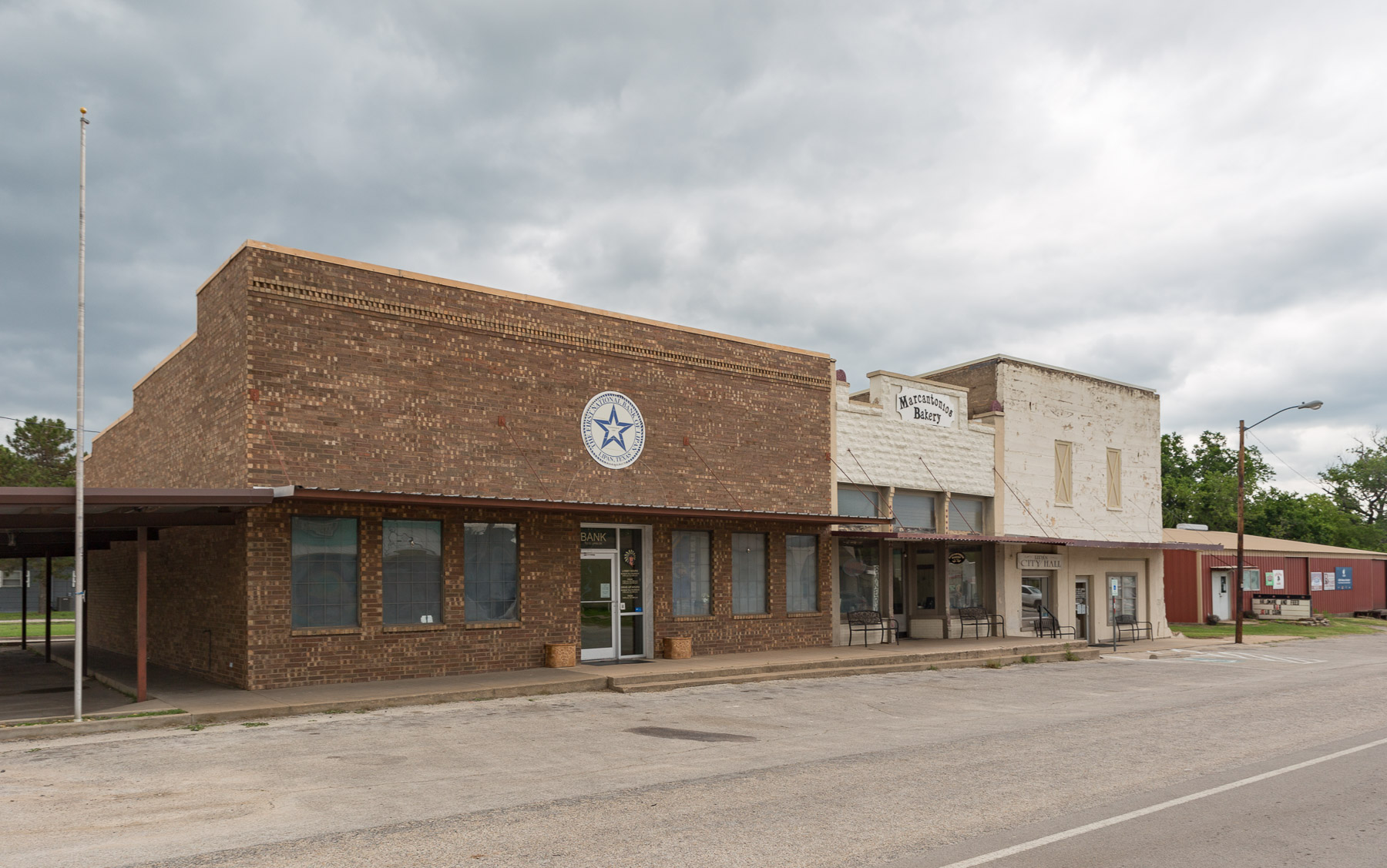
- Lipan, Texas (2021)

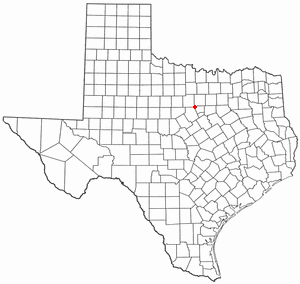
- Location of Lipan, Texas

- Coordinates: 32°31′07″N 98°02′49″W
- Country: United States
- State: Texas
- County: Hood

Area
  - Total: 1.06 sq mi (2.75 km^{2})
  - Land: 1.06 sq mi (2.75 km^{2})
  - Water: 0 sq mi (0.00 km^{2})
- Elevation: 922 ft (281 m)

Population (2020)
  - Total: 505
  - Density: 476/sq mi (184/km^{2})
- Time zone: UTC-6 (Central (CST))
  - Summer (DST): UTC-5 (CDT)
- ZIP code: 76462
- Area code: 254
- FIPS code: 48-42940
- GNIS feature ID: 2410841

Lipan (/ˈlaɪpæn/ LY-pan) is a city in northwestern Hood County, Texas, United States. Its population was 505 at the 2020 census. It is part of the Granbury, Texas micropolitan statistical area.

== Geography ==
According to the United States Census Bureau, the city has a total area of 1.1 square miles (2.8 km^{2}), all of it land.

=== Climate ===
The climate in this area is characterized by relatively high temperatures and evenly distributed precipitation throughout the year.

== Demographics ==
Historical population
Census	Pop.	Note	%±
1960	309		—
1970	333		7.8%
1980	435		30.6%
1990	354		−18.6%
2000	425		20.1%
2010	430		1.2%
2020	505		17.4%
U.S. Decennial Census; 2020 Census

=== 2020 census ===
As of the 2020 census, Lipan had a population of 505, the median age was 35.0 years, 30.7% of residents were under 18, and 11.5% were 65 or older. There were 89.8 males for every 100 females, and 89.2 males for every 100 females 18 and over.

As of the 2020 census, none of residents lived in urban areas, while all lived in rural areas.

Of the 181 households, 45.9% had children under 18 living in them, 56.9% were married-couple households, 13.8% were households with a male householder and no spouse or partner present, 22.7% were households with a female householder and no spouse or partner present, 15.5% were made up of individuals, and 7.2% had someone living alone who was 65 or older.

Of the 205 housing units, 11.7% were vacant, with a homeowner vacancy rate of 2.1% and a rental vacancy rate of 12.1%.

Racial composition as of the 2020 census
Race	Number	Percent
White	451	89.3%
Black or African American	0	0.0%
American Indian and Alaska Native	5	1.0%
Asian	0	0.0%
Native Hawaiian and Other Pacific Islander	3	0.6%
Some other race	12	2.4%
Two or more races	34	6.7%
Hispanic or Latino (of any race)	41	8.1%

=== 2000 census ===
As of the 2000 census, 425 people, 175 households, and 114 families were residing in the city. The population density was 400.9 inhabitants per square mile (154.8/km^{2}). The 204 housing units had an average density of 192.4 per square mile (74.3/km^{2}). The racial makeup of the city was 98.12% White, 0.94% Native American, 0.47% from |other races, and 0.47% from two or more races. Hispanics or Latinos of any race were 7.29% of the population.

Of the 175 households, 30.3% had children under 18 living with them, 53.1% were married couples living together, 11.4% had a female householder with no husband present, and 34.3% were not families. About 29.7% of all households were made up of individuals, and 18.9% had someone living alone who was 65 or older. The average household size was 2.43 and the average family size was 3.03.

In the city, the age distribution was 26.1% under 18, 8.2% from 18 to 24, 26.4% from 25 to 44, 20.9% from 45 to 64, and 18.4% who were 65 or older. The median age was 37 years. For every 100 females, there were 87.2 males. For every 100 females 18 and over, there were 85.8 males.

The median income for a household in the city was $32,333 and for a family was $50,938. Males had a median income of $29,091 versus $17,333 for females. The per capita income for the city was $15,863. About 0.9% of families and 6.1% of the population were below the poverty line, including none of those under 18 and 12.3% of those 65 or over.

== Education ==
The City of Lipan is served by the Lipan Independent School District.
