= Cresson, Texas =

- City
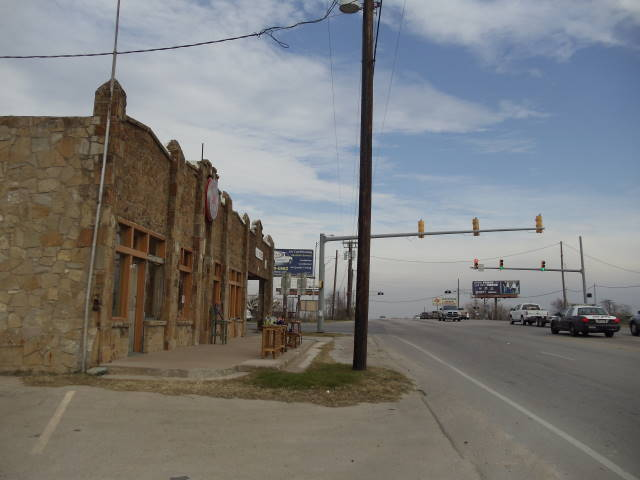
- Downtown Cresson

- Logo
- Interactive map of Cresson, Texas
- Coordinates: 32°31′18″N 97°38′15″W
- Country: United States
- State: Texas
- Counties: Hood, Johnson, Parker

Area
  - Total: 11.55 sq mi (29.91 km^{2})
  - Land: 11.54 sq mi (29.90 km^{2})
  - Water: 0.0039 sq mi (0.01 km^{2})
- Elevation: 1,053 ft (321 m)

Population (2020)
  - Total: 1,349
  - Estimate (2025): 2,126
  - Density: 116.9/sq mi (45.12/km^{2})
- Time zone: UTC-6 (Central (CST))
  - Summer (DST): UTC-5 (CDT)
- ZIP code: 76035
- Area codes: 817, 682
- FIPS code: 48-17648
- GNIS feature ID: 2410263
- Website: https://www.cressontx.org/

Cresson is a city located at the corners of Hood, Johnson, and Parker counties in the U.S. state of Texas. It is located at the intersection of U.S. Highway 377 and State Highway 171, 25 miles (40 km) southwest of Fort Worth. Incorporated in 2001, Cresson had a population of 741 at the 2010 census. By 2020, it had a population of 1,349.

== History ==
The origin of the name has been lost to history. One book suggests the city may have been named after John Cresson, captain of a wagon train that camped in the area before the Civil War. A similar story is told that Cresson was named for an official with the Fort Worth and Rio Grande Railroad.

Cresson was at one time served by the Fort Worth and Rio Grande, the Gulf, Colorado and Santa Fe and the Nancy Hanks railroad companies. It has also been suggested that Cresson was named for Cresson, Pennsylvania, another city with a strong railroading history.

== Geography ==
Cresson is situated on the border between Hood and Johnson counties, with the city limits also extending north into Parker County. US 377 leads northeast 25 miles (40 km) to Fort Worth and southwest 12 miles (19 km) to Granbury, the Hood county seat. State Highway 171 leads northwest 20 miles (32 km) to Weatherford, the Parker County seat, and southeast 19 miles (31 km) to Cleburne, the Johnson County seat. Owing to its location being between these four places makes Cresson an important contribution for fuel stops and an easy place to start (plus rise) a business that contributes to commuters.

According to the U.S. Census Bureau, Cresson has an area of 11.5 square miles (29.9 km^{2}), all land.

=== Climate ===
The climate in this area is characterized by hot, humid summers and generally mild to cool winters. According to the Köppen Climate Classification system, Cresson has a humid subtropical climate, abbreviated "Cfa" on climate maps.

== Demographics ==
Historical population
Census	Pop.	Note	%±
2010	741		—
2020	1,349		82.1%
2025 (est.)	2,126		57.6%
U.S. Decennial Census

As of the 2020 census, there were 1,349 people living in Cresson.

=== 2020 census ===
The median age was 33.3 years, with 29.9% of residents under 18 and 12.8% aged 65 or older; for every 100 females there were 99.0 males and for every 100 females age 18 and over there were 101.9 males.

0.0% of the population lived in urban areas while 100.0% lived in rural areas.

There were 451 households, of which 45.7% had children under 18 years. Married-couple households made up 56.3% of all households, 19.7% had a male householder with no spouse or partner present, 15.3% had a female householder with no spouse or partner present, 14.9% were individuals, and 5.3% had someone 65 or older living alone.

There were 515 housing units, with a homeowner vacancy rate of 3.8% and a rental vacancy rate of 16.6%; 12.4% of units were vacant.

Racial composition as of the 2020 census
Race	Number	Percent
White	1,031	76.4%
Black or African American	130	9.6%
American Indian and Alaska Native	5	0.4%
Asian	4	0.3%
Native Hawaiian and Other Pacific Islander	2	0.1%
Some other race	64	4.7%
Two or more races	113	8.4%
Hispanic or Latino (of any race)	187	13.9%

== Education ==
The Granbury Independent School District, the Godley Independent School District, and Aledo Independent School District serve students in the area.

Most of Cresson in Hood County is in Granbury ISD, with a small portion in Godley ISD. In Johnson County Cresson is divided between Granbury and Godley ISDs. Most of Cresson in Parker County is in Granbury ISD, with a portion in Aledo ISD.

== Gallery ==
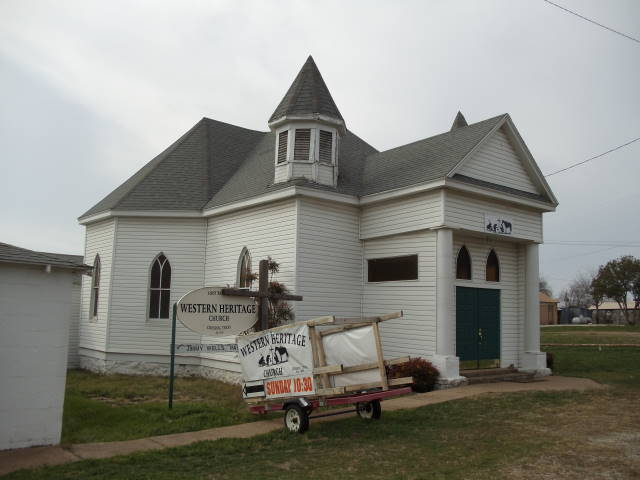
Western Heritage Church

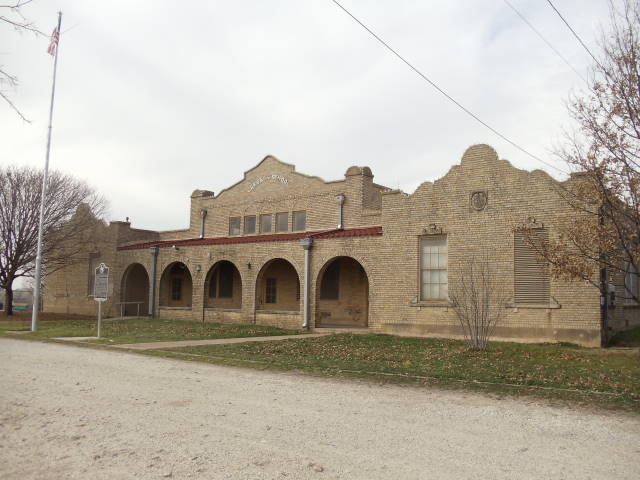
Cresson School
