= Stockton Bend, Texas =

- City
- Location of Stockton Bend, Texas
- Coordinates: 32°28′31″N 97°45′40″W
- Country: United States
- State: Texas
- County: Hood

Area
  - Total: 0.94 sq mi (2.43 km^{2})
  - Land: 0.629 sq mi (1.628 km^{2})
  - Water: 0.31 sq mi (0.80 km^{2})
- Elevation: 699 ft (213 m)

Population (2020)
  - Total: 380
  - Density: 604.4/sq mi (233.36/km^{2})
- Time zone: UTC-6 (Central (CST))
  - Summer (DST): UTC-5 (CDT)
- ZIP code: 76048
- Area codes: 817, 682
- FIPS code: 48-10087
- GNIS feature ID: 2806130

Stockton Bend, formerly Brazos Bend, is a city in Hood County, Texas, United States. It was incorporated in May 2004 originally as "Brazos Bend", and is located along the main stem of the Brazos River. The city is part of the Granbury, Texas Micropolitan Statistical Area. The name was recently changed to "Stockton Bend".

== Geography ==
Historical population
Census	Pop.	Note	%±
2010	305		—
2020	380		24.6%
U.S. Decennial Census

The city is in northeast-central Hood County, on both sides of the Brazos River where it is impounded as Lake Granbury. There is no bridge within the city limits connecting the two parts of the city. The majority of the city is on the west side of the river, occupying the inside of the Stockton Bend river attribute. The city is 4 miles (6 km) northeast of Granbury, the Hood county seat.

== Demographics ==
=== 2020 census ===
As of the 2020 census, Stockton Bend had a population of 380. The median age was 60.8 years. 10.3% of residents were under the age of 18 and 41.1% of residents were 65 years of age or older. For every 100 females there were 105.4 males, and for every 100 females age 18 and over there were 101.8 males age 18 and over.

100.0% of residents lived in urban areas, while 0.0% lived in rural areas.

There were 162 households in Stockton Bend, of which 22.8% had children under the age of 18 living in them. Of all households, 85.2% were married-couple households, 6.2% were households with a male householder and no spouse or partner present, and 6.2% were households with a female householder and no spouse or partner present. About 6.8% of all households were made up of individuals and 3.7% had someone living alone who was 65 years of age or older.

There were 177 housing units, of which 8.5% were vacant. The homeowner vacancy rate was 0.0% and the rental vacancy rate was 0.0%.

Racial composition as of the 2020 census
Race	Number	Percent
White	344	90.5%
Black or African American	1	0.3%
American Indian and Alaska Native	2	0.5%
Asian	5	1.3%
Native Hawaiian and Other Pacific Islander	0	0.0%
Some other race	8	2.1%
Two or more races	20	5.3%
Hispanic or Latino (of any race)	24	6.3%

== Education ==
The Granbury Independent School District serves area students.
