= Hood County News =

- Type: Weekly newspaper
- Owner: South Texas News Inc.
- Publisher: Sam Houston
- Managing editor: Richard Nelson
- Headquarters: 1501 S. Morgan; PO Box 879; Granbury, Texas 76048
- Circulation: 5,580 (as of 2023)
- Sister newspapers: The Gatesville Messenger
- Website: hcnews.com

Hood County News is an American weekly newspaper serving Granbury and Hood County, Texas.

== History ==
The newspaper is descended from the Granbury Vidette, established by W. L. Bond and Francis Edward Garland in November 1872, and the Granbury News, established by J. D. Ballard around 1884. In 1878, Ashley W. Crockett, a grandson of Davy Crockett, was associated with the Granbury Vidette, which he took over completely by August 1883. It also descends from other newspapers, through a series of mergers and other ownership changes, and name changes. Under the ownership of Hood County News, Incorporated, it began its current form in November 1970.

The paper won a number of awards at the 2010 convention of the Texas Press Association. It also prints the Texas Press Messenger for Texas Press Association.

In 2026, South Texas News Inc., owned by Albert Reynolds, acquired the paper from Hyde Media Group, LLC.
