= Sky Harbor, Texas =

Unincorporated community in Texas, US

Coordinates: 32.4889°N 97.7772°W

Sky Harbor is an unincorporated community in Hood County, Texas, United States. Founded by the early 1970s, it is situated east of Farm to Market Road 51, and near Lake Granbury. In 2000, it had a population of 687.
