= De Cordova Bend Dam =

- Interactive map of De Cordova Bend Dam
- Country: United States
- Location: Hood County, Texas
- Status: Operational
- Opening date: 1969

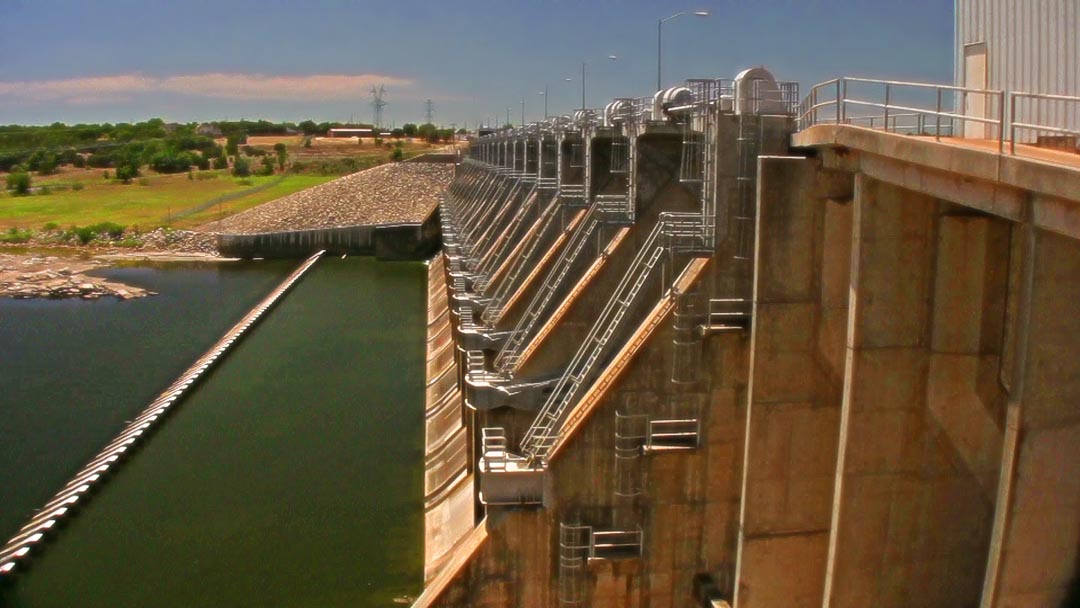
View of the dam from the east

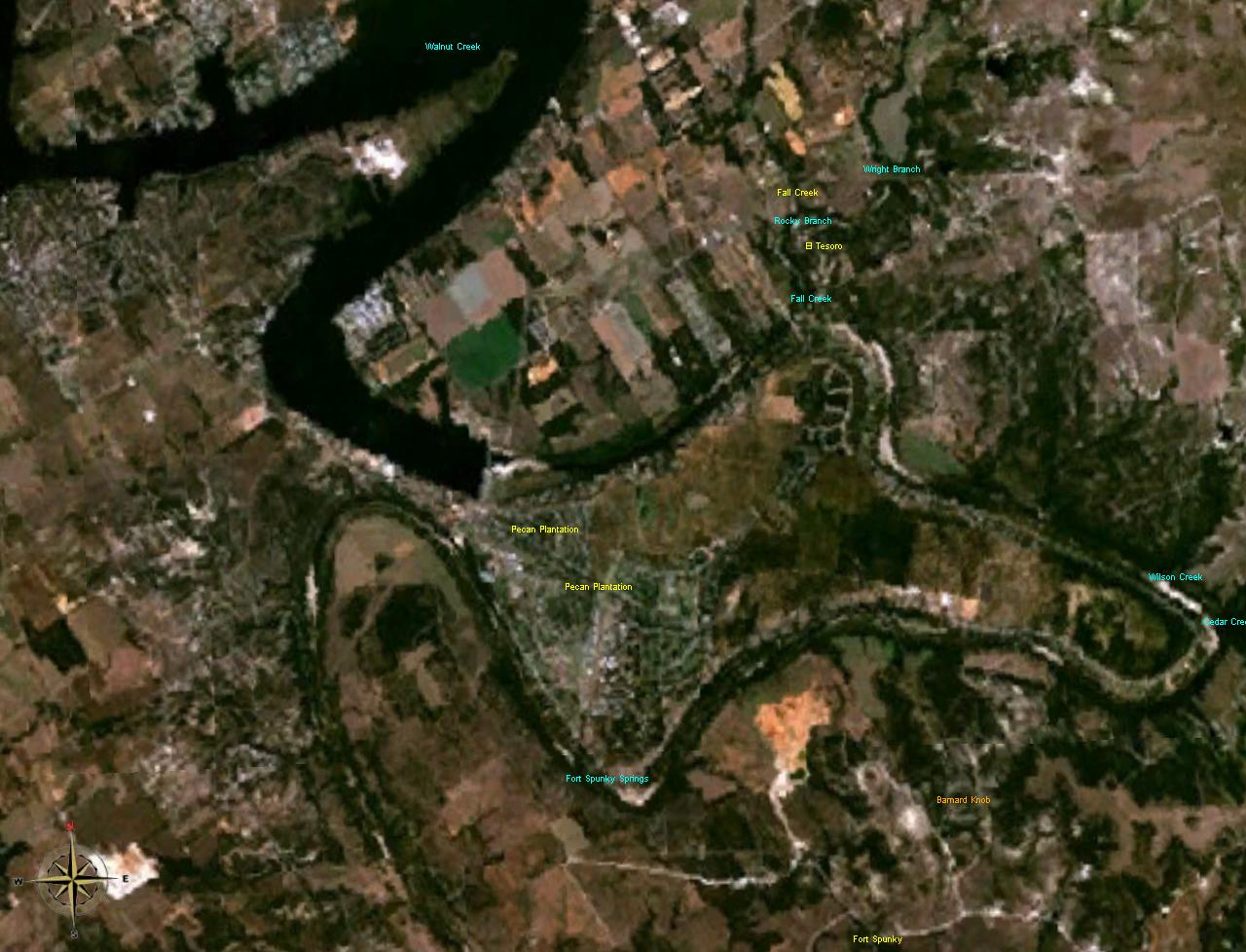
De Cordova Bend Dam as seen by satellite from NASA World Wind

The De Cordova Bend Dam is a man-made dam on the Brazos River in Hood County, Texas, United States, controlled by the Brazos River Authority. De Cordova Bend Dam forms the 8,300-acre (34 km^{2}) Lake Granbury. The dam is so named because of the clockwise almost-complete loop in the Brazos River named De Cordova Bend after Jacob De Cordova.

The dam is one of only three damming the Brazos River.

== Location and access ==
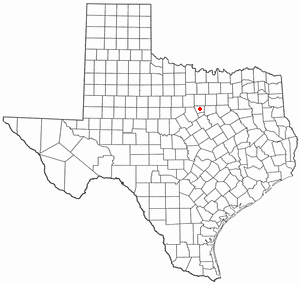
Location of De Cordova Bend Dam

The dam is located at 32°22′26″N 97°41′15″W (32.37393, -97.68753).

The dam is southeast of Granbury, Texas and road access is available by Rainey Ct which crosses the dam.

== History ==
The lake was first proposed in the late 1950s. Construction was begun on the Cordova Bend Dam on December 15, 1966 by the H. B. Zachry Company. Impoundment of water began on September 15, 1969.

The proposed construction of the De Cordova Bend Dam in the mid-1950s became the impetus for John Graves' book, Goodbye to a River.
