= Brazos Bend =

Brazos Bend may refer to:

- 63387 Brazos Bend, a main-belt asteroid
- Brazos Bend, Texas, a city in Hood County, Texas, United States
- Brazos Bend State Park, a state park in Fort Bend County, Texas, United States
