= Tolar, Texas =

- City
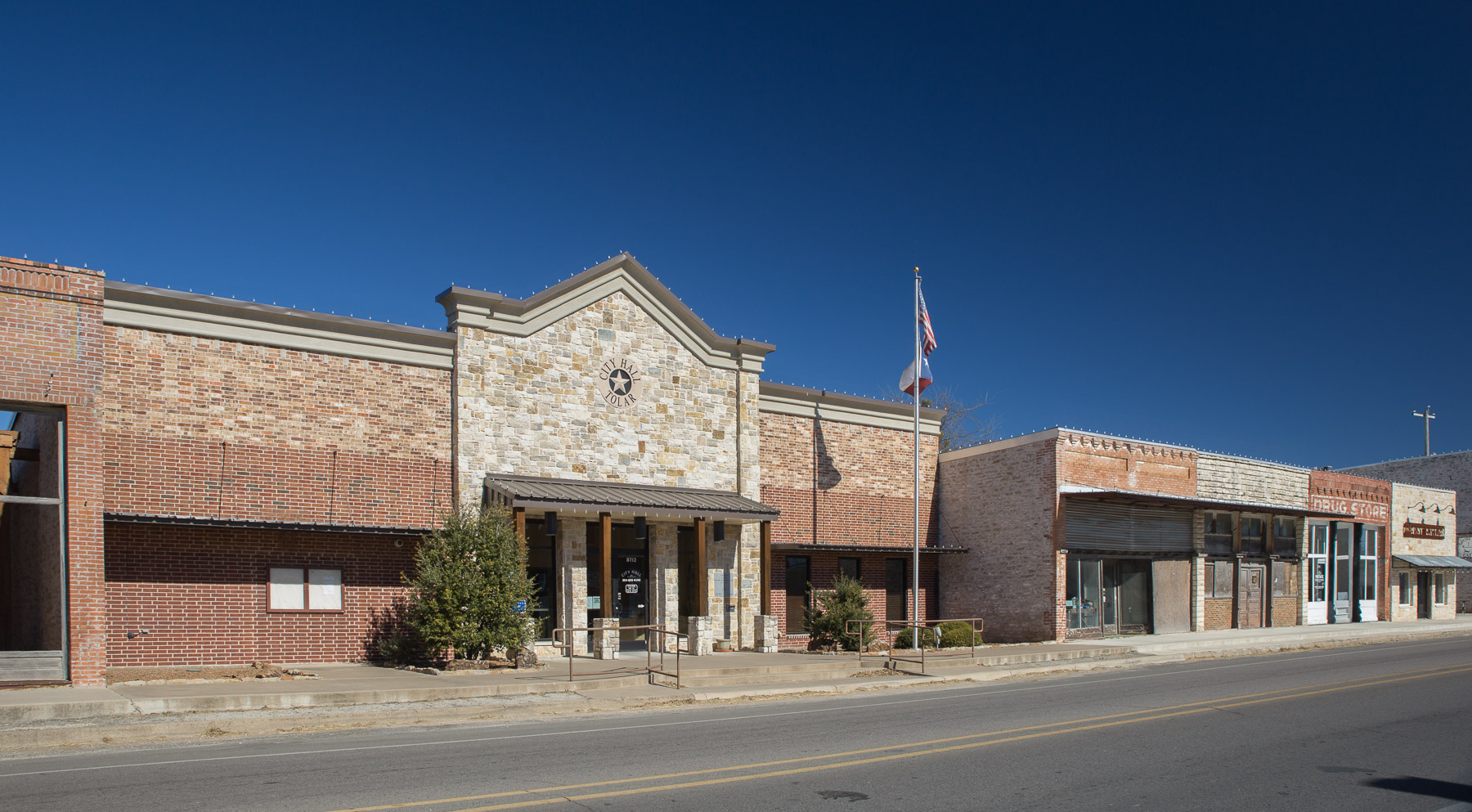
- Tolar, Texas (2022)

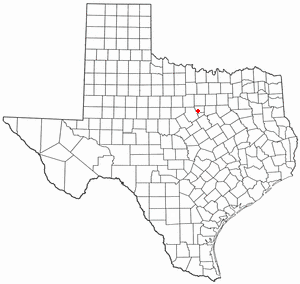
- Location of Tolar, Texas

- Coordinates: 32°23′24″N 97°55′11″W
- Country: United States
- State: Texas
- County: Hood

Area
  - Total: 0.94 sq mi (2.43 km^{2})
  - Land: 0.94 sq mi (2.43 km^{2})
  - Water: 0 sq mi (0.00 km^{2})
- Elevation: 1,024 ft (312 m)

Population (2020)
  - Total: 941
  - Density: 1,000/sq mi (387/km^{2})
- Time zone: UTC-6 (Central (CST))
  - Summer (DST): UTC-5 (CDT)
- ZIP code: 76476
- Area code: 254
- FIPS code: 48-73268
- GNIS feature ID: 2412075
- Website: www.cityoftolar.com

Tolar is a city in Hood County, Texas, United States. Its population was 941 at the 2020 census. It is part of the Granbury, Texas, micropolitan statistical area.

== Geography ==
According to the United States Census Bureau, the city has a total area of 0.9 sq mi (2.3 km^{2}), all land.

== Demographics ==
Historical population
Census	Pop.	Note	%±
1910	455		—
1920	416		−8.6%
1930	318		−23.6%
1940	320		0.6%
1950	338		5.6%
1960	283		−16.3%
1970	312		10.2%
1980	415		33.0%
1990	523		26.0%
2000	504		−3.6%
2010	681		35.1%
2020	941		38.2%
U.S. Decennial Census; 2020 Census

=== 2020 census ===
As of the 2020 census, Tolar had a population of 941. The median age was 31.0 years. 31.5% of residents were under the age of 18 and 10.8% of residents were 65 years of age or older. For every 100 females there were 89.7 males, and for every 100 females age 18 and over there were 92.0 males age 18 and over.

0.0% of residents lived in urban areas, while 100.0% lived in rural areas.

There were 298 households in Tolar, of which 53.0% had children under the age of 18 living in them. Of all households, 56.4% were married-couple households, 16.1% were households with a male householder and no spouse or partner present, and 23.2% were households with a female householder and no spouse or partner present. About 16.2% of all households were made up of individuals and 6.4% had someone living alone who was 65 years of age or older.

There were 336 housing units, of which 11.3% were vacant. The homeowner vacancy rate was 3.3% and the rental vacancy rate was 8.7%.

Racial composition as of the 2020 census
Race	Number	Percent
White	845	89.8%
Black or African American	5	0.5%
American Indian and Alaska Native	5	0.5%
Asian	4	0.4%
Native Hawaiian and Other Pacific Islander	0	0.0%
Some other race	28	3.0%
Two or more races	54	5.7%
Hispanic or Latino (of any race)	73	7.8%

=== 2000 census ===
As of the 2000 census, 504 people, 186 households, and 130 families were residing in the city. The population density was 553.2 people/sq mi mile (213.8/km^{2}). The 217 housing units averaged 238.2/sq mi (92.1/km^{2}). The racial makeup of the city was 93.65% White, 1.39% Native American, 0.40% Asian, 2.78% from other races, and 1.79% from two or more races. Hispanics or Latinos of any race were 5.16% of the population.

Of the 186 households, 35.5% had children under 18 living with them, 55.4% were married couples living together, 10.2% had a female householder with no husband present, and 30.1% were not families. About 28.0% of all households were made up of individuals, and 14.5% had someone living alone who was 65 or older. The average household size was 2.64, and the average family size was 3.20.

In the city, the age distribution was 27.4% under 18, 9.3% from 18 to 24, 26.0% from 25 to 44, 22.8% from 45 to 64, and 14.5% who were 65 or older. The median age was 36 years. For every 100 females, there were 90.9 males. For every 100 females age 18 and over, there were 81.2 males.

The median income for a household in the city was $39,167 and for a family was $45,357. Males had a median income of $32,313 versus $25,208 for females. The per capita income for the city was $17,093. About 7.0% of families and 9.7% of the population were below the poverty line, including 11.2% of those under 18 and 21.7% of those 65 or over.

== Education ==
The City of Tolar is served by the Tolar Independent School District.

== Gallery ==
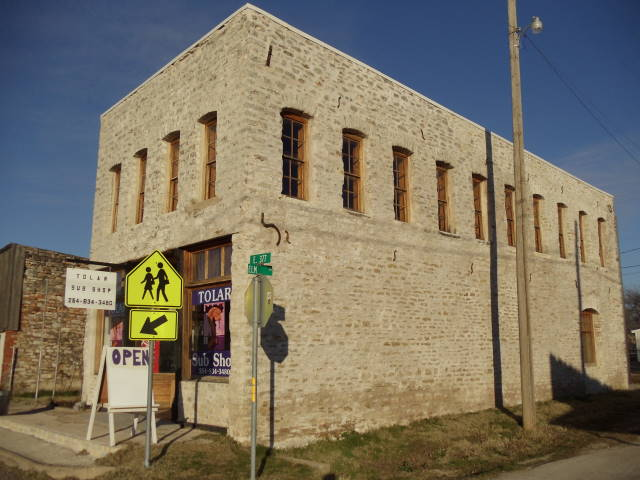
Building in Tolar

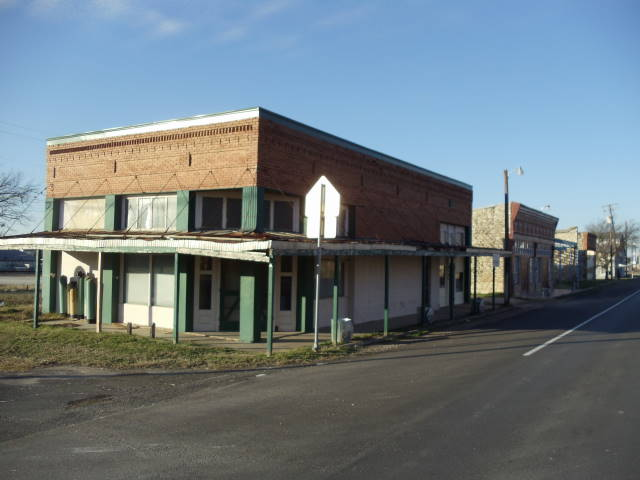
Downtown Tolar

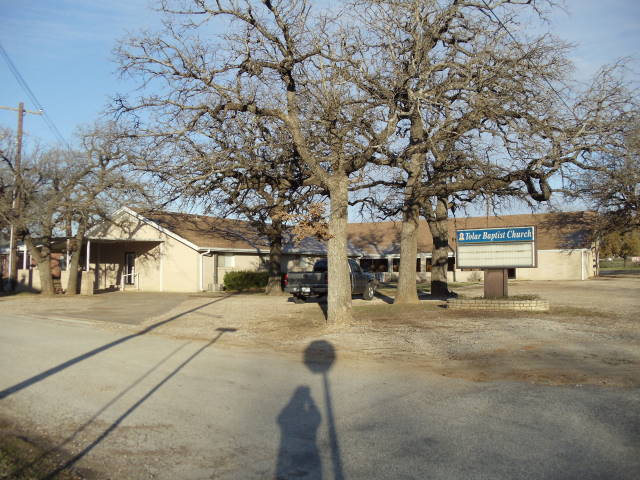
Tolar Baptist Church

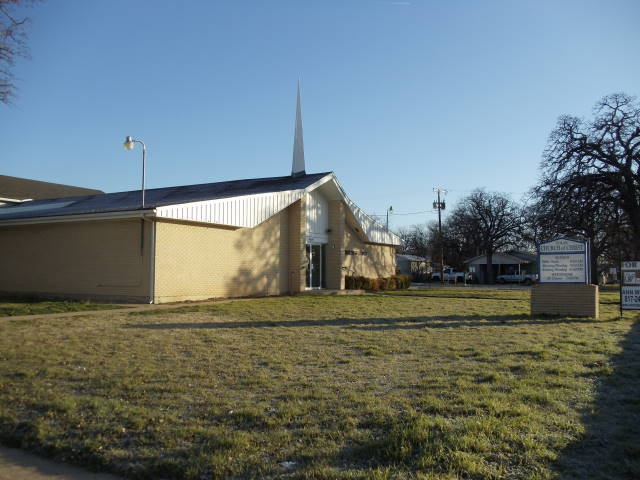
Tolar Church of Christ

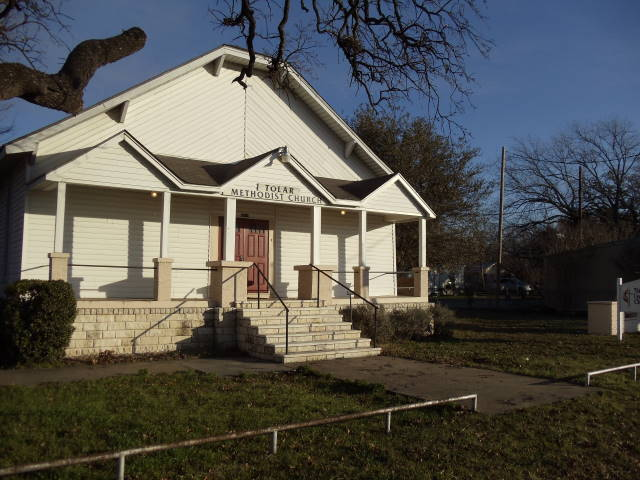
Tolar Methodist Church

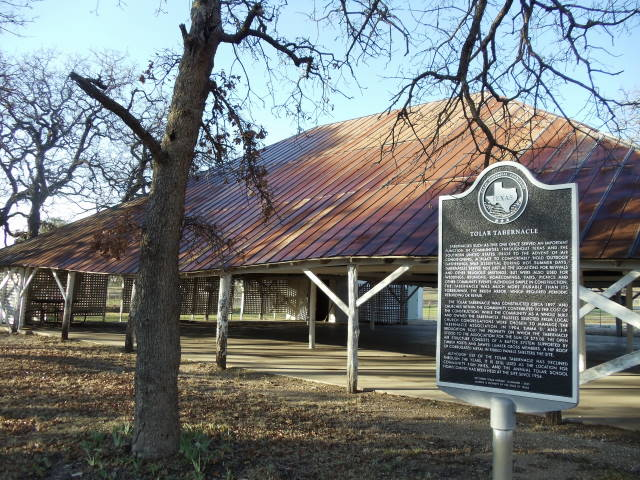
Tolar Tabernacle
