= Hood County Courthouse Historic District =

Historic district in Texas, United States

- U.S. National Register of Historic Places
- U.S. Historic district
- Texas State Antiquities Landmark
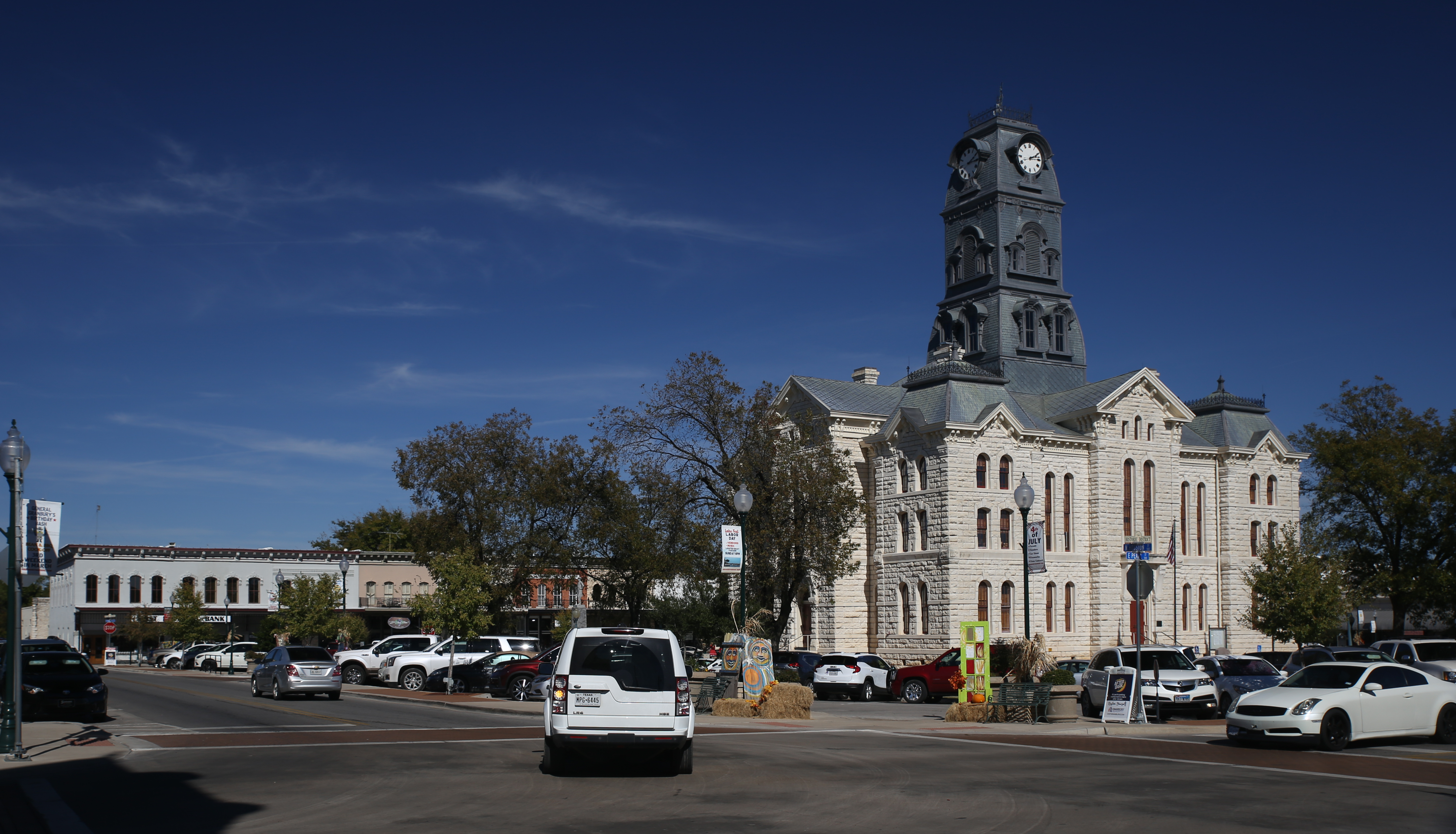
- Hood County Courthouse

- Location within Texas Location within the United States
- Interactive map showing the location of Hood County Courthouse Historic District
- Location: Courthouse Sq., bounded by Bridge, Pearl, and Houston Sts., Granbury, Texas
- Coordinates: 32°26′33″N 97°47′1″W
- Area: 12 acres (4.9 ha)
- Built: 1891
- Architect: W.C. Dodson
- Architectural style: Late Victorian, Second Empire
- NRHP reference No.: 74002080
- TSAL No.: 8200000367

Significant dates
- Added to NRHP: June 5, 1974
- Designated TSAL: January 1, 1981

The Hood County Courthouse Historic District in Granbury, Hood County, Texas encompasses 12 acres of land. The principal building in and the focal point of the district is the historic Hood County Courthouse built in 1890–1891. Other major buildings include the 1885 Hood County Jailhouse, the 1885 First National Bank Building, the 1891 building which formerly housed the Hood County News, the 1893 Aston-Landers Saloon Building, the 1893 Nutt Brothers Building, and the 1886 Granbury Opea House. On June 5, 1974, the district was added to the National Register of Historic Places. The nomination form called it "one of the most complete 19th-century courthouse squares in Texas." The district is also recognized as a State Antiquities Landmark and includes several Recorded Texas Historic Landmarks.

== Hood County Courthouse ==
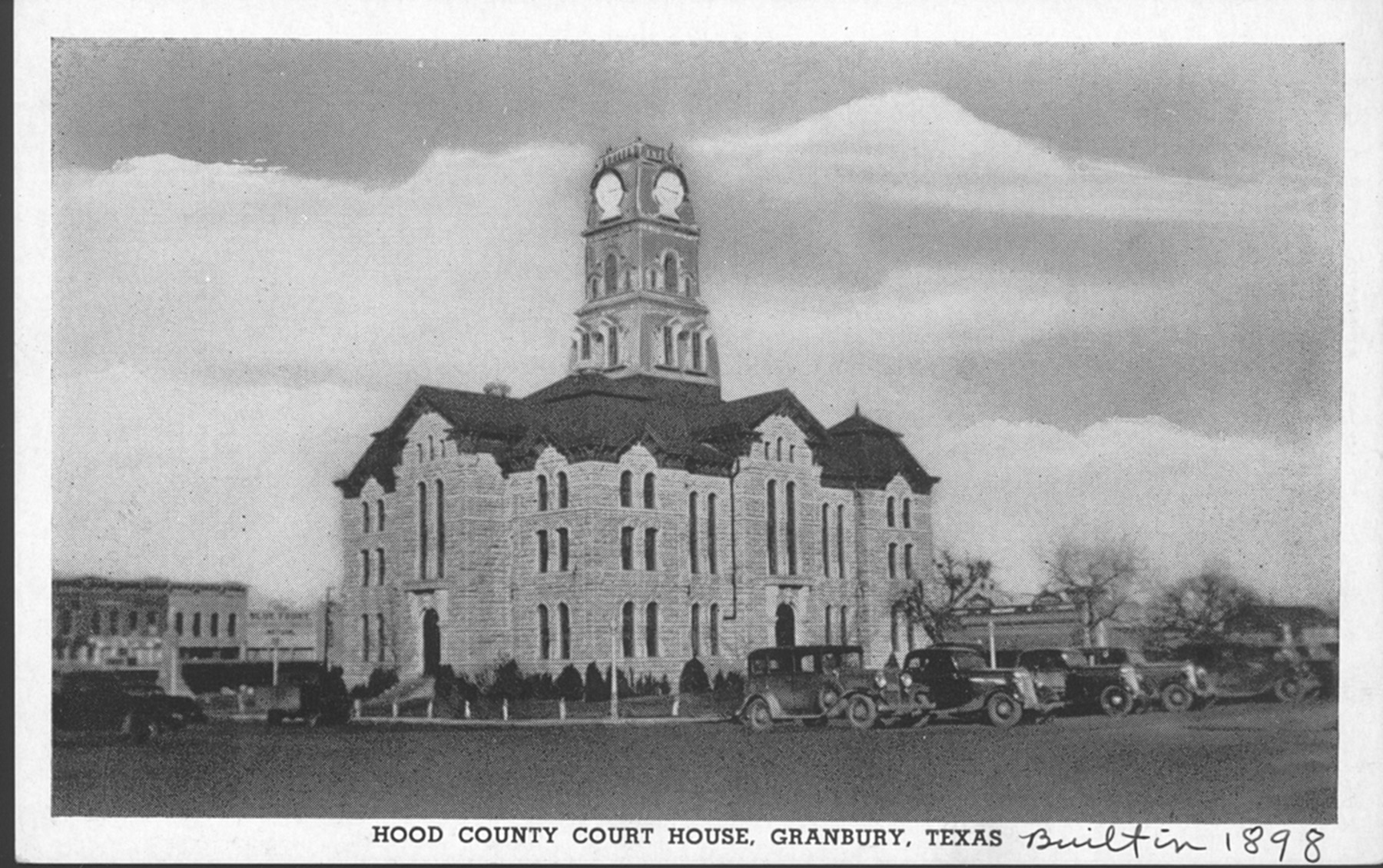
Postcard of Hood County Courthouse, undated

The historic Hood County Courthouse is located in the block bounded by East Bridge Street on the north, North Crockett Street on the east, East Pearl Street on the south and North Houston Street on the west and has an entrance on each side except the north one. It is the fifth courthouse building to occupy this site and was built of Brazos limestone by contractors Moodie and Ellis between 1890 and 1891. It was designed in the Second Empire style by noted Texas courthouse architect Wesley Clark Dodson of Waco (1829–1914). The building features three main stories plus an attic floor under an elaborate mansard roof system. The imposing three-story central clock tower completed after the rest of the building required reinforcement in 1969. In 2000, the exterior of the building was restored. In 2008, a grant was received to restore the interior, including restoring the district courtroom to its original two-story configuration.

Nellie Gray Robertson, first female county attorney in Texas, was elected to the post for Hood County in 1918, and practiced in the courthouse building.

== See also ==
- National Register of Historic Places listings in Hood County, Texas
- Recorded Texas Historic Landmarks in Hood County
