= Bluff Dale, Texas =

- Unincorporated community Census designated place
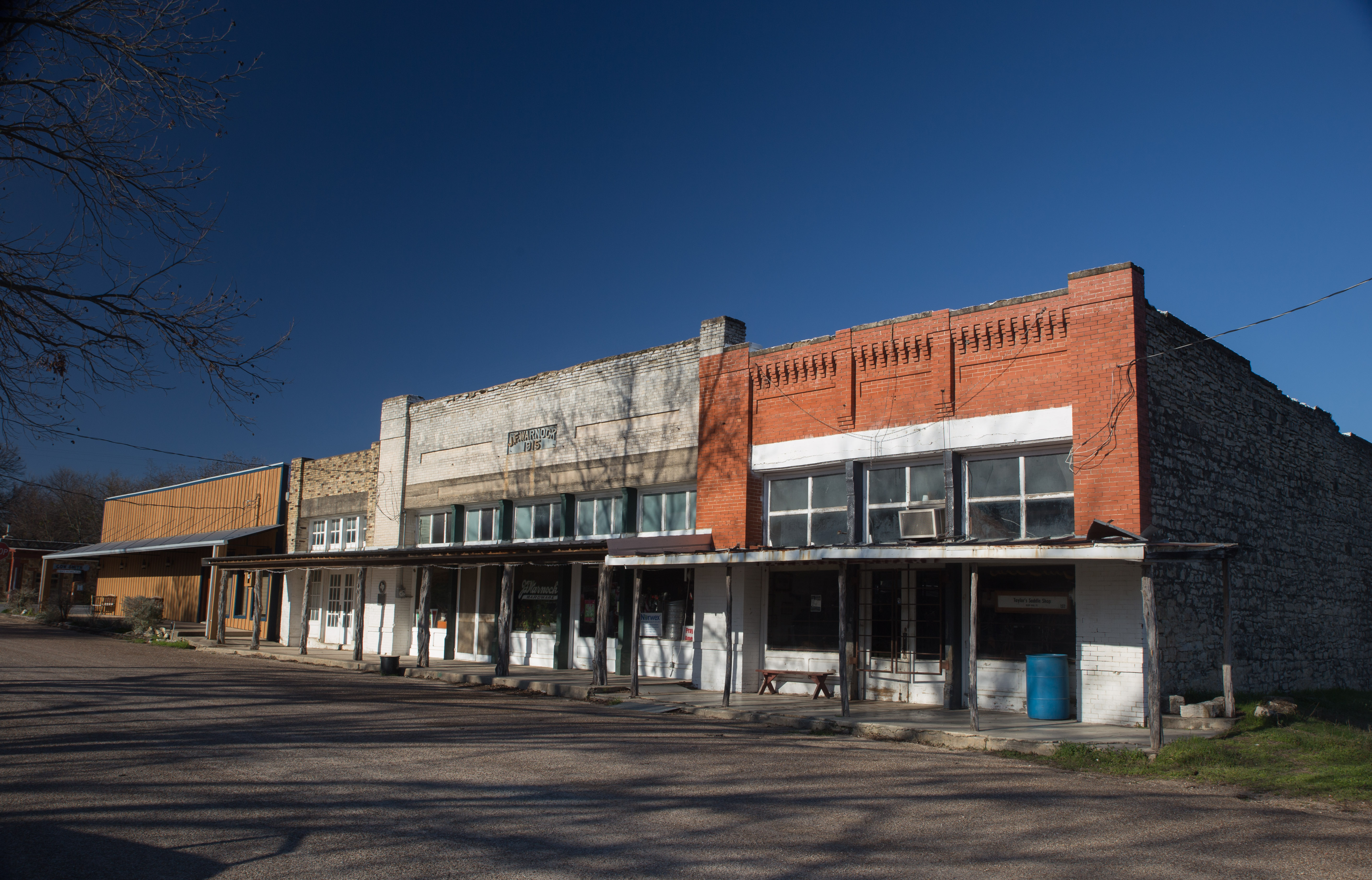

- Location within Texas
- Coordinates: 32°20′59″N 98°01′18″W
- Country: United States
- State: Texas
- County: Erath
- Elevation: 912 ft (278 m)

Population (2020)
  - Total: 151
- Time zone: UTC−06:00 (CST)
  - Summer (DST): UTC−05:00 (CDT)
- Area code: 254
- GNIS feature ID: 2805774

Bluff Dale is an unincorporated community and census designated place (CDP) in Erath County, Texas, United States.

As of the 2020 census, Bluff Dale had a population of 151.

The Bluff Dale Independent School District serves area students.

Bluff Dale, Texas is on U.S. Highway 377 and the North Paluxy River in northeastern Erath County. It was originally called Bluff Springs by pioneers who settled nearby; Bluff Dale became the town name when the post office was established in 1877. In 1889, when the Fort Worth and Rio Grande Railway was built, Jack Glenn donated land for the development of a town. The town was incorporated in 1908. By 1915, a bank and newspaper had been developed. In 1936, Bluff Dale had 680 residents, 500 in 1940, 123 in 1980, and 300 in 1989. In 1989, the town had a Garden Club, three churches, a volunteer fire department, five historical markers, and a beautification committee. A gas station–convenience store was built circa 2002. Around 2005, a bank was opened up.

== Demographics ==
Historical population
Census	Pop.	Note	%±
2020	151		—
U.S. Decennial Census; 1850–1900 1910; 1920 1930 1940; 1950 1960 1970; 1980 1990 2000; 2010 2020

Bluff Dale first appeared as a census designated place in the 2020 U.S. census.

=== 2020 Census ===
Bluff Dale CDP, Texas – Racial and ethnic composition Note: the US Census treats Hispanic/Latino as an ethnic category. This table excludes Latinos from the racial categories and assigns them to a separate category. Hispanics/Latinos may be of any race.
Race / Ethnicity (NH = Non-Hispanic)	Pop 2020	% 2020
White alone (NH)	137	90.73%
Black or African American alone (NH)	0	0.00%
Native American or Alaska Native alone (NH)	1	0.66%
Asian alone (NH)	0	0.00%
Native Hawaiian or Pacific Islander alone (NH)	0	0.00%
Other race alone (NH)	1	0.66%
Mixed race or Multiracial (NH)	7	4.64%
Hispanic or Latino (any race)	5	3.31%
Total	151	100.00%

== Housing ==
The median home cost in Bluff Dale is $208,600. Home appreciation the last year has been -0.36 percent.

== Cost of living ==
Compared to the rest of the country, Bluff Dale's cost of living is 16.43% lower than average.

== Education ==
Bluff Dale public schools spend $6,770 per student compared to the average of $6,058 in the US. There are about 11 students per teacher in Bluff Dale. Bluff Dale competes in UIL.

== Historical markers ==
=== Bluff Dale Suspension Bridge ===
This iron bridge was open to the public spanning the Paluxy River in 1891.

It is located along Berry Creek Rd. (CR-149), ¼ mile N. of US-377 in Erath County Texas.

While the historical marker identifies the bridge as a suspension bridge, it is actually a cable stayed bridge design, and as such is probably the oldest of its type in the United States.

=== Bluff Dale Tabernacle ===
Built in 1906; the land was donated by Andrew Glenn. Community events, funerals, and school graduations are held here. Originally used for early denominations in revivals that lasted for days.

Recorded Texas Historic Landmark, Texas Historical Commission, 1982.

Glenn St. and Holmes St., Bluff Dale, Erath County Texas

=== Old Public Water Well TX3786 ===
Dug around 1887 and used in the early days for travelers and cattle herds. The well was dug by the Fort Worth Rio Grande Railroad and was primarily utilized to supply locomotives. Still in use today.

State Historical Survey Committee, 1971.

Greenwood St., Bluff Dale, Erath County Texas

== Photo gallery ==
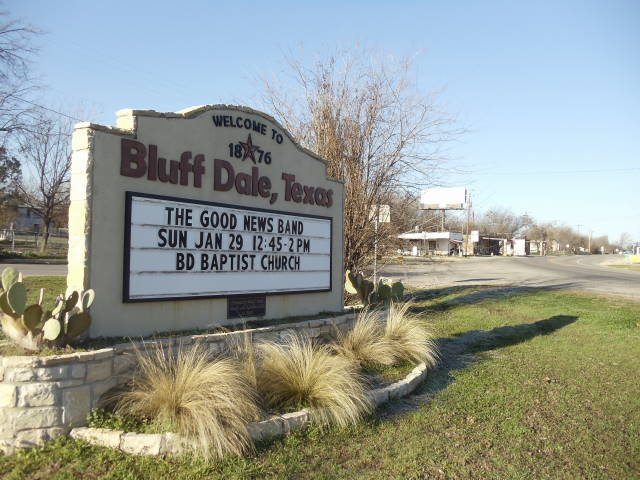
Bluff Dale, Texas

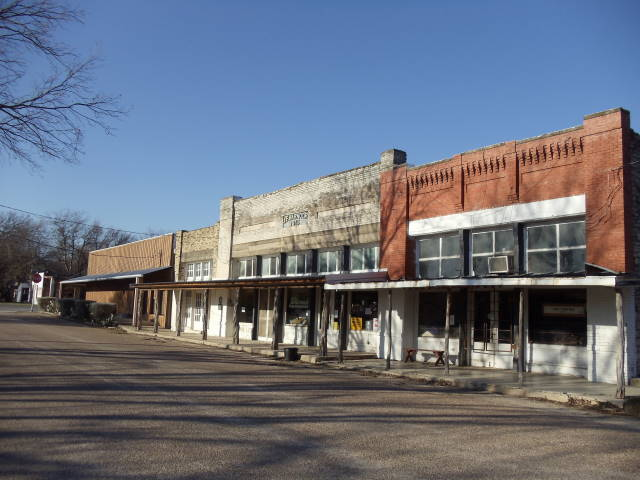
Bluff Dale, Texas

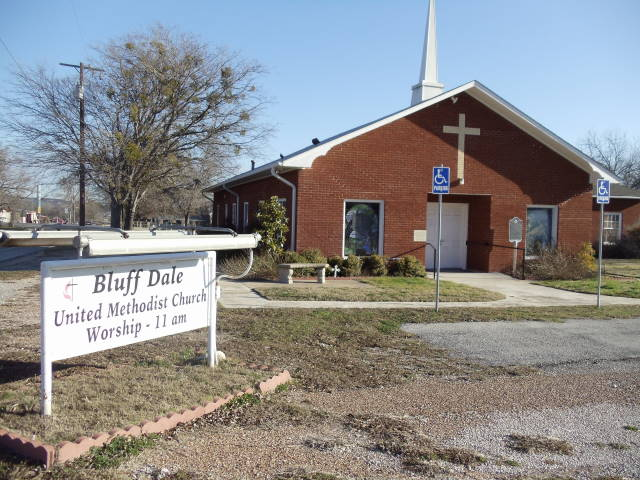
Bluff Dale United Methodist Church

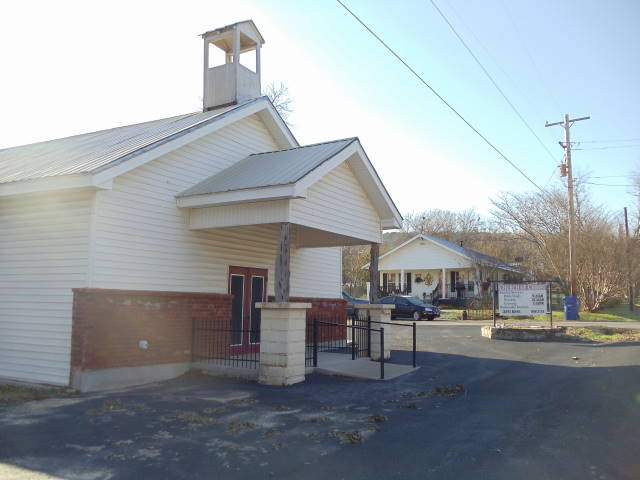
Bluff Dale Church of Christ

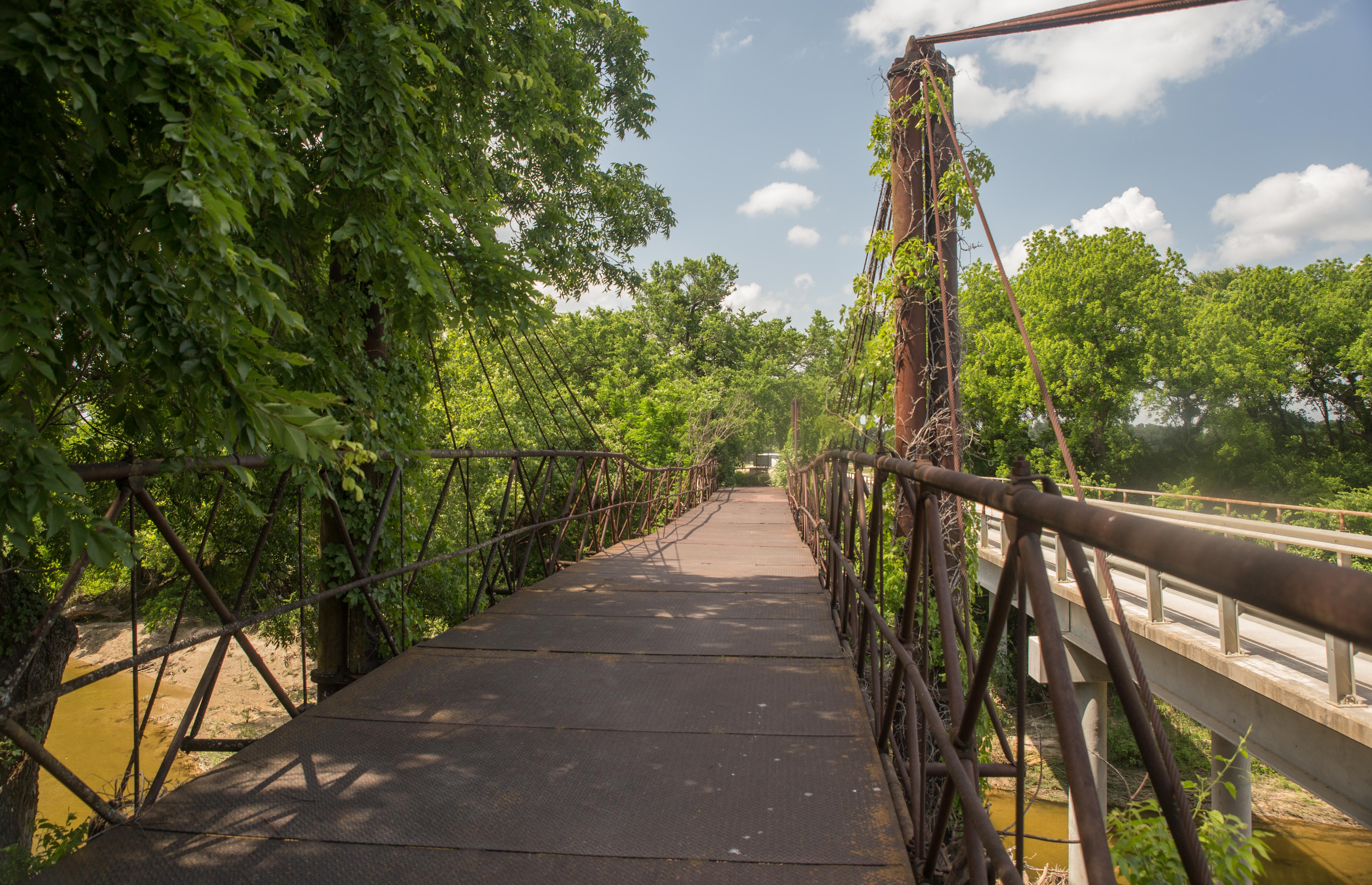
Bluff Dale Suspension Bridge

== Climate ==
The climate in this area is characterized by relatively high temperatures and evenly distributed precipitation throughout the year. The Köppen Climate System describes the weather as humid subtropical, and uses the abbreviation Cfa.
