= North Central Texas Academy =

Private Christian school in Texas

Location
- 3846 North Highway 144; Granbury, Texas 76048; United States; 32.289880°N 97.729729°W

Information
- Type: Private school
- Established: 1975; 51 years ago
- Dean: Amanda Schwausch (faculty)
- Faculty: 29
- Grades: PreK-12
- Enrollment: 183 (2013-2014)
- Campus size: 500 acres
- Color
- Team name: Pioneers
- Website: www.northcentraltexasacademy.org

North Central Texas Academy (NCTA) is a boarding, day, and international Christian school, located on a 500-acre campus known as Happy Hill Farm. It is fully accredited (K-12) by the Southern Association of Colleges and Schools (SACS). There is an athletic center, dining center, fine arts center, residences for boarding students, staff housing, an agricultural center with a show ring, livestock pens, stables and riding trails, athletic fields, a track and stadium, swimming pool, tennis courts, a welcome center, an inn and training center, and an administrative center.

== History ==
The academy was opened in 1975, with 20 students in a mobile home. High potential students from low opportunity situations, international, and local day students study within a college-preparatory environment.

== Academy life ==
As a working farm with an FFA Chapter, Happy Hill Farm raises cattle, swine, lambs, and goats. There are horses, llamas, alpacas, longhorns, and buffalo. NCTA has a very large and active FFA program. Students in these programs care daily for their livestock. Grain and hay crops are also grown.

NCTA teams excel in volleyball, basketball, soccer, and more, competing as an independent school.

The students live in boarding homes. There are up to eight students per house, two per room, and each home has a live-in resident parent couple and a live-in single assistant resident parent.
