= Bluff Dale Independent School District =

School district in Texas

Coordinates: 32°21′00″N 98°01′27″W

Location
- ESC Region 11 Bluff Dale, Erath County, Texas, 76433; USA

District information
- Type: Independent School District
- Grades: Pre-K through 12
- Superintendent: Jason Wells
- Governing agency: Texas Education Agency
- Schools: 1
- Budget: $2.02 million (2020–2021)
- NCES District ID: 4810620

Students and staff
- Students: 218 (2020–2021)
- Teachers: 15.55 (2017–2018)
- Staff: 27.48 (2017–2018)

Other information
- TEA Accountability Rating: Academically Acceptable (2011–12)
- Website: www.bdisd.net

Bluff Dale Independent School District is a public school district based in the community of Bluff Dale, Texas.

Located in Erath County, a small portion of the district lies in Hood County.

The district has one school that serves students in grades pre-kindergarten through 12th grade. As part of the successful $5.1 million 2018 bond election, Bluff Dale was able to build a new Junior/Senior High School which includes 6 instructional rooms, 1 science lab, a new gym and locker rooms, kitchen, cafeteria, library and media center. It will also begin construction on a new elementary school addition, which include remodels, 4 instructional classrooms, and a new nurse station and storage. Also included as part of the bond election are district safety and security additions.

== School history ==
Records from the minutes of an Erath County Commissioners Court meeting in early 1867 shows the beginning of the Bluff Dale School. Schools at this time were considered “subscription” schools and typically a fee of $1.00 per month per student was collected.

An old log house was the setting for the first Bluff Dale School and the first teacher was Lum Stephens. In 1880, a box, stripped house on Holmes Street was built. The building on Holmes Street burned and a new building was constructed about 1900 at the present school site. This building was a relatively large plank building with at least two rooms in a T-shaped floor plan.

As the school began to grow, a larger building was needed, and on June 23, 1906, a vote was cast and an independent school district was formed. A bond election was held for the purpose of constructing a free public school building of stone material. The bond election passed on September 22, 1906, and a new stone building was built.

Bluff Dale I.S.D. used to have a large school that consisted of a two-story, rock building. It was built in 1906 and stayed standing until 1929. Even though it was not around in our time doesn’t mean it was not significant to the citizens of Bluff Dale.

Before this school was built, the students had to go to school in a little building that was described as a small one room boxed and stripped house. The students sat on long slatted benches instead of desks. After the population of students increased the school decided it was time to build a bigger building.

The school went from Kindergarten through 12th grade. Still, the numbers increased. The building had four large class rooms and three small rooms which were used as a library, music room, and a private study/work room. This school encouraged all students to participate in clubs and athletics. In 1922, the first student-made yearbook was published. Over the years, this building adapted an 11th grade system, then eventually a 10th grade system and finally to the current 8th grade system.

In the spring of 1927, during a storm lightning struck the steeple of the school and knocked it off. The lightning strike occurred during school time and several students were injured. The following year concerns about the structural integrity of the building were voiced and the school board petitioned to remodel the building in 1929.

This red brick one-story building was completed and put in use for the term of 1929–1930.

The back of this school building is made out of the old native stone from the previous building.

The building had three classrooms, an office, library, auditorium, and a cafeteria. Before 1946 they had kindergarten through 12th grade. In 1947 they adopted the 8th grade system and high school students were bused to Stephenville.

In 1999 they had to tear down this school full of many memories because it was considered unsafe.

The current Bluff Dale I.S.D. School building was built in 1999 after the old building was considered unsafe and obsolete. The new school has three exit doors and is built of a solid brick structure. There are 6 classrooms, a conference room, office area, and a teacher workroom. Security cameras and an intercom system are part of the main building.

The Community has played an important role in Bluff Dale School’s History. Behind the school is playground equipment, assembled by many volunteers and a new pavilion was added to the playground area.

Bluff Dale Independent School District is part of Texas Education Service Center Region 11 . Under the Texas Education Agency's legacy accountability system, the district earned the state's highest rating of "Exemplary" across seven years between 1998 and 2006, and was previously recognized as a National Title I Distinguished School .

== Academic achievement ==
In 2011, the school district was rated "academically acceptable" by the Texas Education Agency. Forty-nine percent of districts in Texas in 2011 received the same rating. No state accountability ratings will be given to districts in 2012. A school district in Texas can receive one of four possible rankings from the Texas Education Agency: Exemplary (the highest possible ranking), Recognized, Academically Acceptable, and Academically Unacceptable (the lowest possible ranking).

Historical district TEA accountability ratings

- 2011: Academically Acceptable
- 2010: Exemplary
- 2009: Recognized
- 2008: Recognized
- 2007: Academically Acceptable
- 2006: Exemplary
- 2005: Academically Acceptable
- 2004: Recognized
