= Lipan Independent School District =

School district in Texas

Address
- 211 N. Kickapoo Street Lipan, Hood County, Texas, 76462; United States

District information
- Type: Public, independent school district
- Grades: PK-12
- Superintendent: Jimmy Dobbs Principal k-5 Jennifer Phillips Principal 6-12 Kay Cole
- Governing agency: Texas Education Agency, Region 11
- Schools: 2
- Budget: $6.64 million (2015-2016)
- NCES District ID: 4827630

Students and staff
- Students: 436 (2018-2019)
- Teachers: 35.26 (on an FTE basis) (2018-2019)
- Staff: 56.32 (on an FTE basis) (2018-2019)

Other information
- Website: www.lipanindians.net

Lipan Independent School District is a public school district based in Lipan, Texas, United States.

Located in Hood County, portions of the district extend into Erath, Palo Pinto, and Parker counties.

Lipan ISD has one school that serves students in grades pre-kindergarten through twelve.

In 2009, the school district was rated "recognized" by the Texas Education Agency.

== Students ==
=== Academics ===
STAAR - At Approaches Grade Level or Above (Sum of All Grades Tested)
Subject	Lipan ISD	Region 11	State of Texas
Reading/ELA	80%	77%	75%
Mathematics	88%	82%	82%
Writing	81%	70%	68%
Science	79%	83%	81%
Soc. Studies	77%	82%	81%
All Tests	82%	79%	78%

Students in Lipan match or outperform local region and statewide averages on standardized tests. In 2018-2019 State of Texas Assessments of Academic Readiness (STAAR) results, 82% of students in Lipan ISD met Approaches Grade Level standards, compared with 79% in Region 11 and 78% in the state of Texas. The average SAT score of the students tested in 2017-18 was 1076, and average ACT score was not reported.

=== Demographics ===
In the 2018–2019 school year, the school district had a total of 435 students, ranging from pre-kindergarten through grade 12. The class of 2018 included 23 graduates; the annual drop-out rate across grades 9-12 was reported as 0.0%.

As of the 2018–2019 school year, the ethnic distribution of the school district was 84.1% White, 13.6% Hispanic, 0.7% American Indian, 0.2% African American, 0.2% Pacific Islander, and 1.1% from two or more races; no Asian students were reported. Economically disadvantaged students made up 48.7% of the student body, compared with 60.6% of all Texas students.

== Athletics ==
The Lipan Indians compete in the following sports:

Cross Country, Volleyball, Basketball, Baseball, Softball, and Track and Field.

=== State Titles ===
- Boys Basketball
  - 1994 (1A), 2005 (1A/D2), 2017 (1A), 2018 (1A), 2023 (2A), 2024 (2A), 2026 (2A/D2)
- Girls Basketball
  - 2016 (1A), 2021 (2A), 2023 (2A), 2026 (2A/D2)
