= Granbury Independent School District =

School district in Texas

Coordinates: 32.4457°N 97.7951°W

Location
- Granbury, Texas, USA Region 11 USA

District information
- Type: Public
- Grades: Pre-K through 12
- Superintendent: Ann Dixon, Ed.D.
- Governing agency: Texas Education Agency
- NCES District ID: 4821390

Students and staff
- Students: 6,971
- Teachers: 445.9
- Staff: 854.9

Other information
- Website: Granbury ISD

Granbury Independent School District is a public school district based in Granbury, Texas (USA).

In addition to Granbury, the district serves the eastern Hood County cities of DeCordova and Stockton Bend (formerly Brazos Bend), and the majority of Cresson. The district boundary also includes the unincorporated communities of Canyon Creek, Oak Trail Shores, and Pecan Plantation. Small portions of Parker, Johnson, and Somervell counties also lie within the district.

In 2022, the district was involved in controversy around the actions of superintendent Jeremy Glenn, who specifically ordered district librarians to remove books with LGBTQ themes and characters. Legal experts said that these actions raised constitutional concerns of illegal discrimination.

== Schools ==
=== High schools ===
- Grades 9-12
  - Granbury High School
- Alternative Academic High School
  - STARS Accelerated High School

=== Middle schools ===
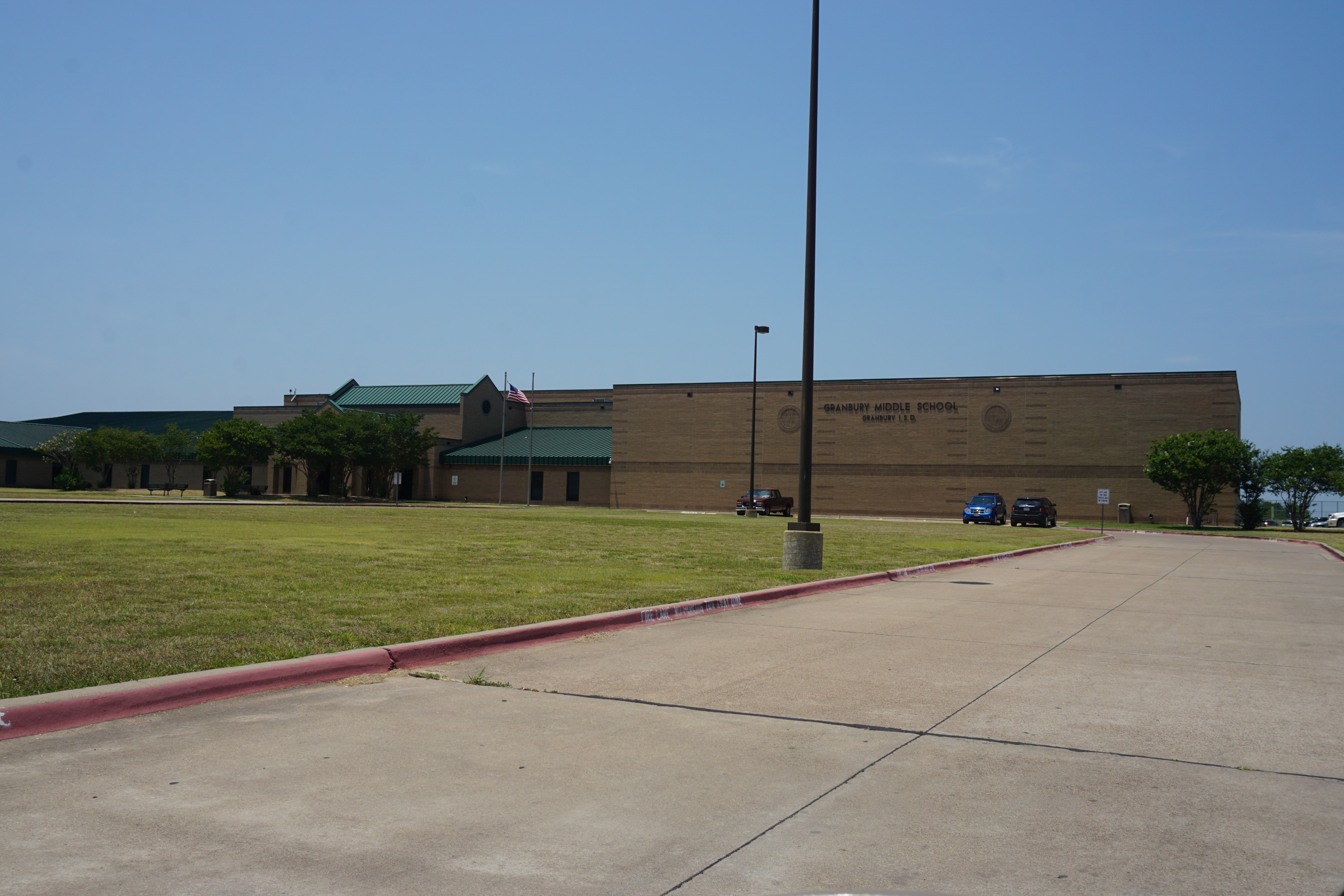
Granbury Middle School

- Grades 6-8
  - Granbury Middle School
  - Acton Middle School

=== Elementary schools ===
- Grades PK-5
  - Acton Elementary School
  - STEAM Academy at Mambrino
  - Nettie Baccus Elementary School
  - Oak Woods Elementary School
  - Brawner Elementary
- PRE K Only
  - Emma Roberson Elementary School

=== Behavior school ===
- All Grades
  - Behavior Transition Center

== Students ==
=== Academics ===
STAAR - Percent at Level II Satisfactory Standard or Above (Sum of All Grades Tested)
Subject	Granbury ISD	Region 11	State of Texas
Reading	74%	76%	73%
Mathematics	77%	78%	76%
Writing	66%	72%	69%
Science	83%	81%	79%
Soc. Studies	77%	80%	77%
All Tests	76%	77%	75%

Students in Granbury typically perform close to local region and statewide averages on standardized tests. In 2015-2016 State of Texas Assessments of Academic Readiness (STAAR) results, 76% of students in Granbury ISD met Level II Satisfactory standards, compared with 77% in Region 11 and 75% in the state of Texas. The average SAT score of the class of 2015 was 1461, and the average ACT score was 21.9.

=== Demographics ===
In the 2020-2021 school year, the school district had 7,712 students. 44.2% of students were considered at risk of dropping out of school. 9.7% of students were enrolled in bilingual and English language learning programs.

The school received an accountability rating of B for the 2021-2022 school year.

In the Class of 2021, 95.2% of students received their high school diplomas on time or earlier. The dropout rate for students in grades 9-12 was 1.2% during the 2020-2021 school year.

Race and ethnicity African American 100 (1.3%) American Indian 26 (0.3%) Asian 69 (0.9%) Hispanic 2,021 (26.2%) Pacific Islander 23 (0.3%) White 5,245 (68%) Two or more races 228 (3%)

== Book banning and discrimination ==
In 2015, district librarians received 50 complaints to remove two books from their shelves, both of which center LGBTQ content: Gayle E. Pitman's This Day in June and Cheryl Kilodavis's My Princess Boy. The library board refused to remove the books, stating that the books do not promote homosexuality and that parental approval is already required to check out the books; however, they moved This Day in June to the adult section. Challengers turned to the Hood County Commissioners Court, which ruled that banning the books could be unconstitutional.

Between 2015 and 2022, challengers protested the decision and politically mobilized to gain access to the school board and commissioners court. In November 2021, those running for historically non-partisan city positions (e.g., school board) included signal phrases such as "conservative" and "Republican" in their campaign materials. Courtney Gore and Melanie Graft, who ran for and won positions on the school board, promised to "comb through educational materials for any signs of 'indoctrination' in the form of books or lesson plans that they charged promote LGBTQ ideology or what they referred to as critical race theory."

In 2022, Superintendent Jeremy Glenn is reported to have met with district librarians behind closed doors to instruct them to remove books featuring LGBTQ characters and storylines, even if those books did not describe sex or violence, saying, "It’s the transgender, LGBTQ ... that’s what we’re pulling out." As a result of the meeting, the libraries removed 130 titles for review, nearly 75% of which featured LGBTQ characters or themes. Kate Huddleston, a staff attorney with the American Civil Liberties Union of Texas, commented that this "is very much evidence of anti-LGBTQ and particularly anti-trans discrimination."
