= Tolar Independent School District =

School district in Texas

Tolar Independent School District is a public school district based in Tolar, Texas, United States.

In addition to Tolar, the district also serves the community of Paluxy.

In 2009, the school district was rated "academically acceptable" by the Texas Education Agency.

== Schools ==
- Tolar High/Junior High School (grades 6-12)
- Tolar Elementary School (prekindergarten-grade 5)
