= Hood County, Texas =

County in Texas, United States

- County
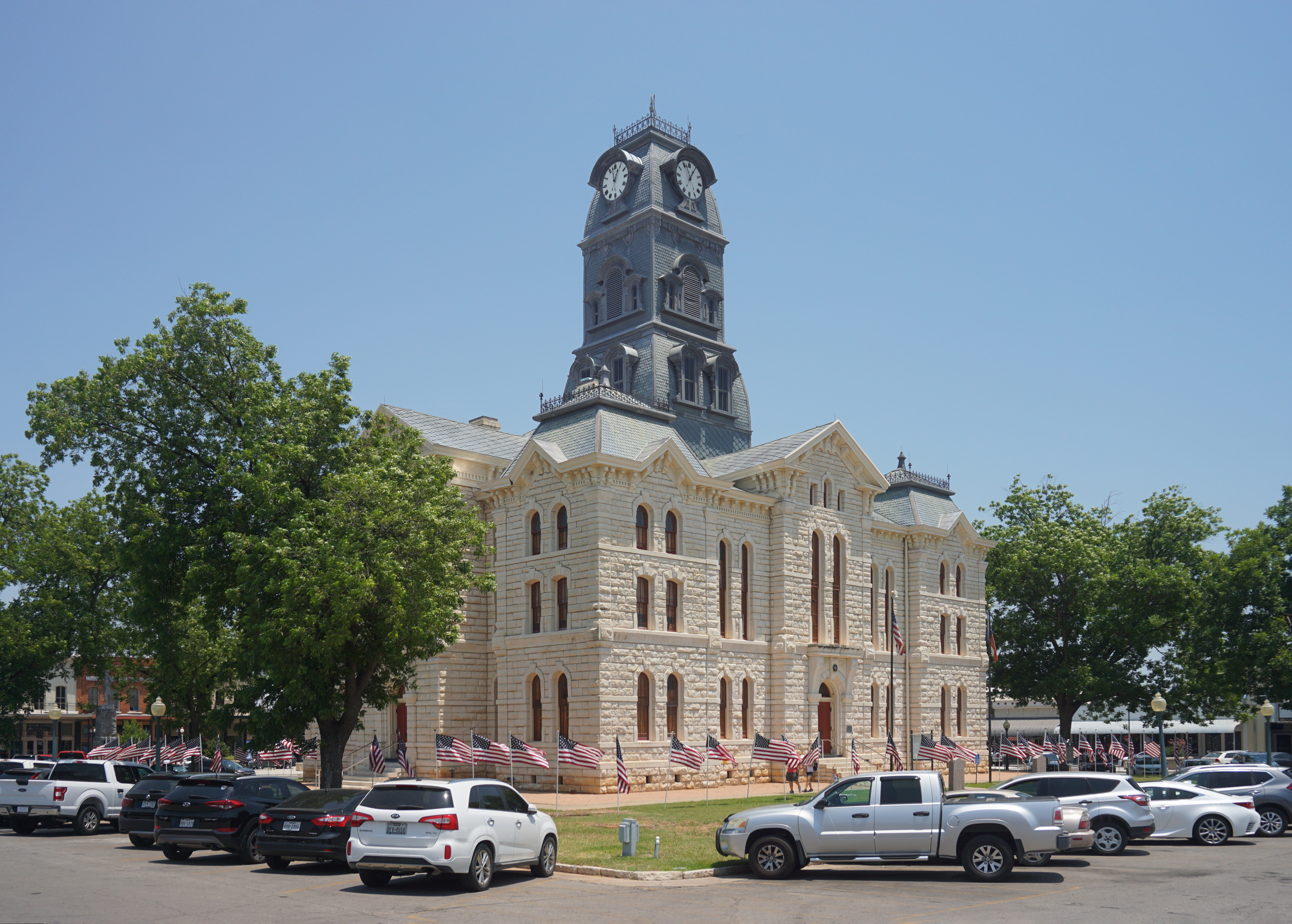
- The Hood County Courthouse in Granbury

- Location within the U.S. state of Texas
- Coordinates: 32°26′N 97°50′W
- Country: United States
- State: Texas
- Founded: 1866
- Named for: John Bell Hood
- Seat: Granbury
- Largest city: Granbury

Area
  - Total: 437 sq mi (1,130 km^{2})
  - Land: 421 sq mi (1,090 km^{2})
  - Water: 16 sq mi (41 km^{2}) 3.7%

Population (2020)
  - Total: 61,598
  - Estimate (2025): 70,501 ▲
  - Density: 146/sq mi (56.5/km^{2})
- Time zone: UTC−6 (Central)
  - Summer (DST): UTC−5 (CDT)
- Congressional district: 25th
- Website: hoodcounty.texas.gov

Hood County is a county in the U.S. state of Texas. As of the 2020 census, its population was 61,598. Its county seat is Granbury. The county is named for John Bell Hood, a Confederate lieutenant general and the commander of Hood's Texas Brigade.

Hood County is part of the Granbury micropolitan area. It is adjacent to and is influenced by the Dallas–Fort Worth metroplex.

== History ==
Hood County was formed in 1866 from portions of Johnson and Erath Counties. It was named after John Bell Hood, a general of the Confederate Army and commander of Hood's Texas Brigade.

== Geography ==
According to the U.S. Census Bureau, the county has a total area of 437 sq mi (1,130 km^{2}), of which 421 sq mi (1,090 km^{2}) are land and 16 sq mi (41 km^{2}) (3.7%) are covered by water.

=== Major highways ===
- U.S. Highway 377
- State Highway 144
- State Highway 171
- Loop 567

=== Adjacent counties ===
- Parker County (north)
- Johnson County (east)
- Somervell County (south)
- Erath County (west)
- Palo Pinto County (northwest)

== Demographics ==
Historical population
Census	Pop.	Note	%±
1870	2,585		—
1880	6,125		136.9%
1890	7,614		24.3%
1900	9,146		20.1%
1910	10,008		9.4%
1920	8,759		−12.5%
1930	6,779		−22.6%
1940	6,674		−1.5%
1950	5,287		−20.8%
1960	5,443		3.0%
1970	6,398		17.5%
1980	17,714		176.9%
1990	28,981		63.6%
2000	41,100		41.8%
2010	51,182		24.5%
2020	61,598		20.4%
2025 (est.)	70,501	▲	14.5%
U.S. Decennial Census; 1850–2010 2010 2020

=== Racial and ethnic composition ===
Hood County, Texas – Racial and ethnic composition Note: the US Census treats Hispanic/Latino as an ethnic category. This table excludes Latinos from the racial categories and assigns them to a separate category. Hispanics/Latinos may be of any race.
Race / Ethnicity (NH = Non-Hispanic)	Pop 1980	Pop 1990	Pop 2000	Pop 2010	Pop 2020	% 1980	% 1990	% 2000	% 2010	% 2020
White alone (NH)	17,114	27,251	37,193	44,588	49,815	96.61%	94.03%	90.49%	87.12%	80.87%
Black or African American alone (NH)	18	52	112	225	495	0.10%	0.18%	0.27%	0.44%	0.80%
Native American or Alaska Native alone (NH)	61	147	303	288	340	0.34%	0.51%	0.74%	0.56%	0.55%
Asian alone (NH)	36	166	123	296	468	0.20%	0.57%	0.30%	0.58%	0.76%
Native Hawaiian or Pacific Islander alone (NH)	x	x	17	32	53	x	x	0.04%	0.06%	0.09%
Other race alone (NH)	10	12	20	34	180	0.06%	0.04%	0.05%	0.07%	0.29%
Mixed race or Multiracial (NH)	x	x	357	485	2,289	x	x	0.87%	0.95%	3.72%
Hispanic or Latino (any race)	475	1,353	2,975	5,234	7,958	2.68%	4.67%	7.24%	10.23%	12.92%
Total	17,714	28,981	41,100	51,182	61,598	100.00%	100.00%	100.00%	100.00%	100.00%

=== 2020 census ===
As of the 2020 census, the county had a population of 61,598, and the median age was 48.0 years. 20.1% of residents were under the age of 18 and 26.5% of residents were 65 years of age or older. For every 100 females there were 95.4 males, and for every 100 females age 18 and over there were 93.0 males age 18 and over.

The racial makeup of the county was 83.9% White, 0.8% Black or African American, 0.8% American Indian and Alaska Native, 0.8% Asian, 0.1% Native Hawaiian and Pacific Islander, 4.6% from some other race, and 9.0% from two or more races. Hispanic or Latino residents of any race comprised 12.9% of the population.

58.9% of residents lived in urban areas, while 41.1% lived in rural areas.

There were 24,811 households in the county, of which 26.1% had children under the age of 18 living in them. Of all households, 57.5% were married-couple households, 15.0% were households with a male householder and no spouse or partner present, and 22.5% were households with a female householder and no spouse or partner present. About 24.3% of all households were made up of individuals and 13.4% had someone living alone who was 65 years of age or older.

There were 28,321 housing units, of which 12.4% were vacant. Among occupied housing units, 76.9% were owner-occupied and 23.1% were renter-occupied. The homeowner vacancy rate was 2.0% and the rental vacancy rate was 9.6%.

=== 2010 census ===
As of the 2010 census, about 3.4 same-sex couples per 1,000 households were in the county.

=== 2000 census ===
As of the 2000 census, 41,100 people, 16,176 households, and 12,099 families were residing in the county. The population density was 98 people/mi^{2} (38 people/km^{2}). The 19,105 housing units averaged 45 per square mile (17/km^{2}). The racial makeup of the county was 94.77% White, 0.33% African American, 0.82% Native American, 0.31% Asian, 2.44% from other races, and 1.32% from two or more races. About 7.24% of the population were Hispanic or Latinos of any race.

Of the 16,176 households, 28.80% had children under 18 living with them, 63.6% were married couples living together, 7.8% had a female householder with no husband present, and 25.2% were not families. About 21.6% of all households were made up of individuals, and 10.0% had someone living alone who was 65 or older. The average household size was 2.50, and the average family size was 2.88.

In the county, the age distribution was 23.6% under 18, 6.7% from 18 to 24, 25.2% from 25 to 44, 26.6% from 45 to 64, and 17.9% who were 65 or older. The median age was 42 years. For every 100 females, there were 96.2 males. For every 100 females 18 and over, there were 94.10 males.

The median income for a household in the county was $43,668 and for a family was $50,111. Males had a median income of $38,662 versus $23,723 for females. The per capita income for the county was $22,261. About 6.00% of families and 8.5% of the population were below the poverty line, including 10.0% of those under age 18 and 7.4% of those 65 or over.

== Media ==
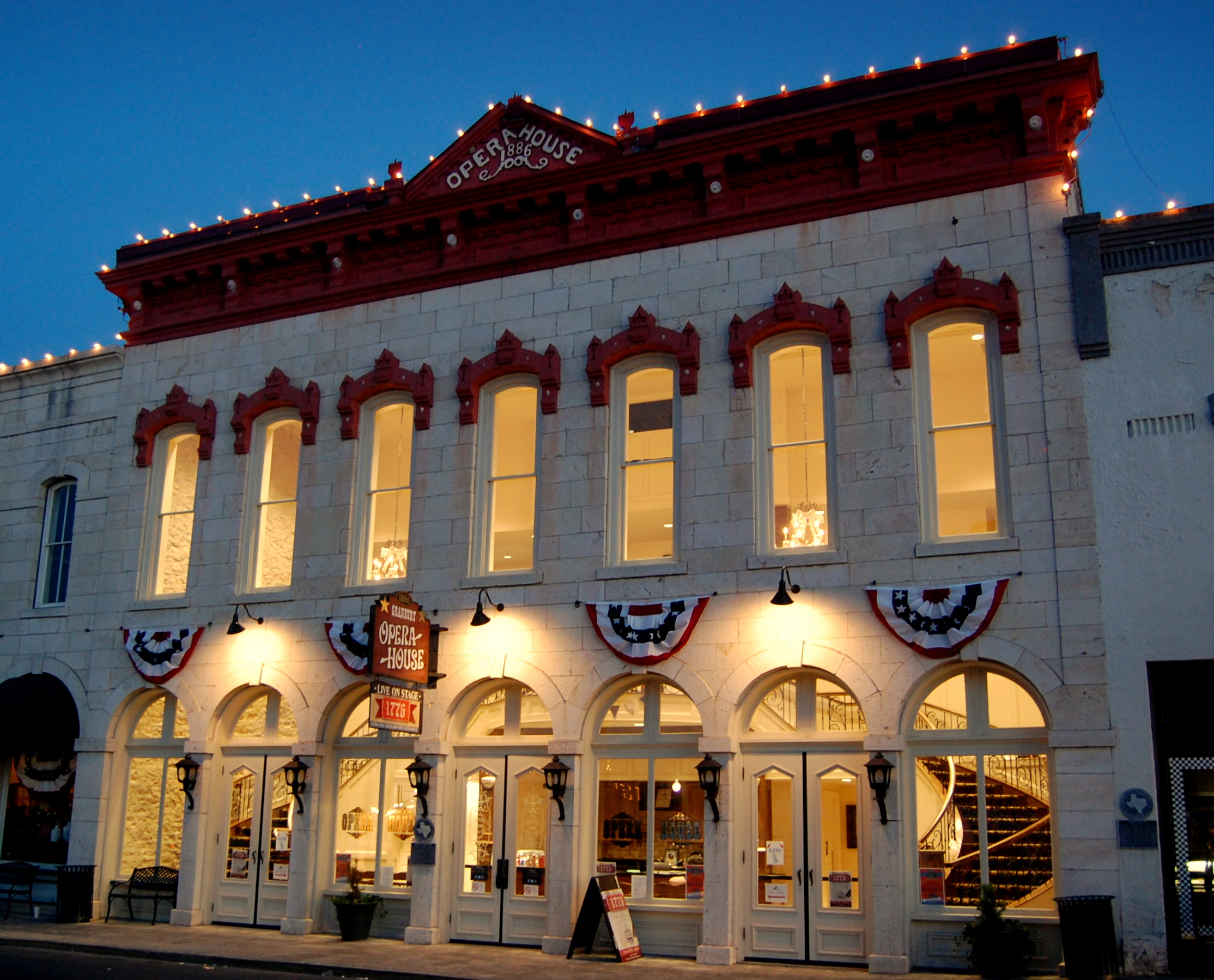
The restored Granbury Opera House was adorned with patriotic decorations during the 2014 Fourth of July festival.

Hood County is part of the Dallas/Fort Worth television media market in North Central Texas. Local news media outlets are KDFW-TV, KXAS-TV, WFAA-TV, KTVT-TV, KERA-TV, KTXA-TV, KDFI-TV, KDAF-TV, KFWD-TV, and KDTX-TV. Hood County is served by two newspapers, Hood County Free Press, an online daily publication, and the biweekly Hood County News https://hcnews.com.

== Education ==
These school districts serve Hood County:

- Bluff Dale ISD (mostly in Erath County)
- Godley ISD (mostly in Johnson County, small portion in Tarrant County)
- Granbury ISD (small portion in Johnson, Parker Counties)
- Lipan ISD (small portion in Erath, Palo Pinto, and Parker Counties)
- Tolar ISD

== Politics ==
In presidential elections, Hood County has become a predominantly Republican county since 1980.

United States presidential election results for Hood County, Texas
Year	Republican		Democratic		Third party(ies)	
Year	No.	%	No.	%	No.	%
1912	38	4.53%	674	80.43%	126	15.04%
1916	64	7.60%	693	82.30%	85	10.10%
1920	175	17.16%	697	68.33%	148	14.51%
1924	122	9.71%	1,074	85.51%	60	4.78%
1928	640	57.09%	479	42.73%	2	0.18%
1932	106	8.62%	1,119	90.98%	5	0.41%
1936	102	9.32%	988	90.31%	4	0.37%
1940	166	11.18%	1,318	88.75%	1	0.07%
1944	146	9.92%	1,203	81.73%	123	8.36%
1948	169	11.24%	1,273	84.64%	62	4.12%
1952	780	36.52%	1,356	63.48%	0	0.00%
1956	751	40.55%	1,095	59.13%	6	0.32%
1960	943	43.12%	1,238	56.61%	6	0.27%
1964	423	20.27%	1,661	79.59%	3	0.14%
1968	593	27.44%	1,155	53.45%	413	19.11%
1972	1,743	64.32%	949	35.02%	18	0.66%
1976	1,857	36.69%	3,181	62.85%	23	0.45%
1980	3,755	54.11%	3,001	43.24%	184	2.65%
1984	6,817	68.71%	3,063	30.87%	41	0.41%
1988	7,400	63.16%	4,255	36.32%	61	0.52%
1992	5,313	37.52%	4,359	30.78%	4,490	31.70%
1996	7,575	52.06%	5,459	37.52%	1,516	10.42%
2000	12,429	71.00%	4,704	26.87%	372	2.13%
2004	16,280	76.46%	4,865	22.85%	148	0.70%
2008	17,299	76.46%	5,087	22.48%	238	1.05%
2012	18,409	81.53%	3,843	17.02%	327	1.45%
2016	21,382	81.42%	4,008	15.26%	872	3.32%
2020	26,496	81.28%	5,648	17.33%	453	1.39%
2024	30,174	82.55%	6,070	16.61%	309	0.85%

United States Senate election results for Hood County, Texas1
Year	Republican		Democratic		Third party(ies)	
Year	No.	%	No.	%	No.	%
2024	29,112	79.84%	6,604	18.11%	747	2.05%

United States Senate election results for Hood County, Texas2
Year	Republican		Democratic		Third party(ies)	
Year	No.	%	No.	%	No.	%
2020	26,253	81.58%	5,228	16.25%	700	2.18%

Texas Gubernatorial election results for Hood County
Year	Republican		Democratic		Third party(ies)	
Year	No.	%	No.	%	No.	%
2022	22,596	82.99%	4,301	15.80%	331	1.22%

== Communities ==
=== Cities ===
- Cresson (partly in Parker and Johnson counties)
- DeCordova
- Granbury (county seat)
- Lipan
- Stockton Bend
- Tolar

=== Census-designated places ===
- Canyon Creek
- Oak Trail Shores
- Pecan Plantation

=== Unincorporated communities ===
- Acton
- Paluxy
- Sky Harbor
- Thorp Spring

== See also ==
- List of museums in North Texas
- National Register of Historic Places listings in Hood County, Texas
- Recorded Texas Historic Landmarks in Hood County
