= Godley Independent School District =

School district in Texas

Location
- Godley, Texas United States of America

District information
- Type: Public
- Superintendent: Dr. Rich Dear
- Governing agency: Texas Education Agency
- Budget: $20.2 million
- NCES District ID: 4820960

Students and staff
- Students: 1,765
- Teachers: 145.2
- Staff: 321.7

Other information
- Website: https://www.godleyisd.net/

Godley Independent School District is a public school district based in Godley, Texas (USA).

In 2010, the school district was rated "Recognized" by the Texas Education Agency.

== Schools ==
- Godley High School (Grades 9-12)
- Godley Middle School (Grades 7-8)
- Godley 6th Grade Campus (Grade 6)
- Legacy Elementary School (Grades K-5)
- Pleasant View Elementary (Grades PK-5)
- RB Godley Elementary (Grades PK-5)
- LINKS Academy (ALT School)

== Students ==
=== Academics ===
STAAR - Percent at Level II Satisfactory Standard or Above (Sum of All Grades Tested)
Subject	Godley ISD	Region 11	State of Texas
Reading	71%	76%	73%
Mathematics	74%	78%	76%
Writing	61%	72%	69%
Science	69%	81%	79%
Soc. Studies	67%	80%	77%
All Tests	70%	77%	75%

Local region and statewide averages on standardized tests typically exceed the average scores of students in Godley. In 2015-2016 State of Texas Assessments of Academic Readiness (STAAR) results, 70% of students in Godley ISD met Level II Satisfactory standards, compared with 77% in Region 11 and 75% in the state of Texas. The average SAT score of the class of 2015 was 1442, and the average ACT score was 22.2.

=== Demographics ===
In the 2015–2016 school year, the school district had a total of 1,765 students, ranging from early childhood education and pre-kindergarten through grade 12. The class of 2015 included 112 graduates; the annual drop-out rate across grades 9-12 was 1.0%.

As of the 2015–2016 school year, the ethnic distribution of the school district was 70.6% White, 23.3% Hispanic, 2.2% American Indian, 1.1% African American, 0.3% Asian, 0.1% Pacific Islander, and 2.5% from two or more races. Economically disadvantaged students made up 56.7% of the student body.
