= Lake Granbury =

- Location within Texas Location within the United States
- Location: Hood County, Texas, United States
- Coordinates: 32°22′26″N 97°41′16″W
- Type: Reservoir
- Primary inflows: Brazos River
- Primary outflows: Brazos River
- Basin countries: United States
- Surface area: 8,310 acres (3,360 ha)
- Max. depth: 75 ft (23 m)
- Water volume: 153,500 acre⋅ft (0.1893 km^{3})
- Shore length^{1}: 103 miles (221 km)
- Surface elevation: 693 ft (211 m)
- ^{1} Shore length is not a well-defined measure.

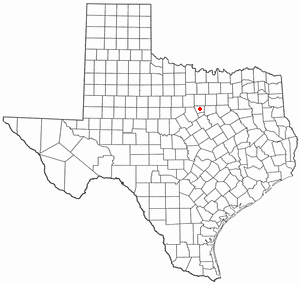
Location of Lake Granbury, Texas

Lake Granbury is a reservoir in North Texas near Granbury, Texas. It was created in 1969 and is one of three lakes damming the Brazos River.

Lake Granbury is a long, narrow lake with 103 miles (221 km) of shoreline leading to the De Cordova Bend Dam. The lake is controlled by the Brazos River Authority in Granbury.

== History ==
The lake and Cordova Bend Dam were proposed in the late 1950s. Construction began on the dam on December 15, 1966, by the Zachry Construction Company. Impoundment of water began on September 15, 1969.

The proposed construction of the De Cordova Bend Dam became the impetus for John Graves' book, Goodbye to a River.

== Fish populations ==
- Largemouth bass
- Striped bass
- White bass
- Channel catfish
- Flathead catfish
- White crappie
- Sunfish
- Longnose Gar

The lake is annually stocked with bass and in past years with catfish.

== Recreational uses ==
- Boating
- Wakeboarding
- Water skiing
- Fishing

== Recreational areas ==
- Thorp Spring
- Hunter Park
- City Park
- Rough Creek
- De Cordova Bend
