= Granbury, Texas =

- City
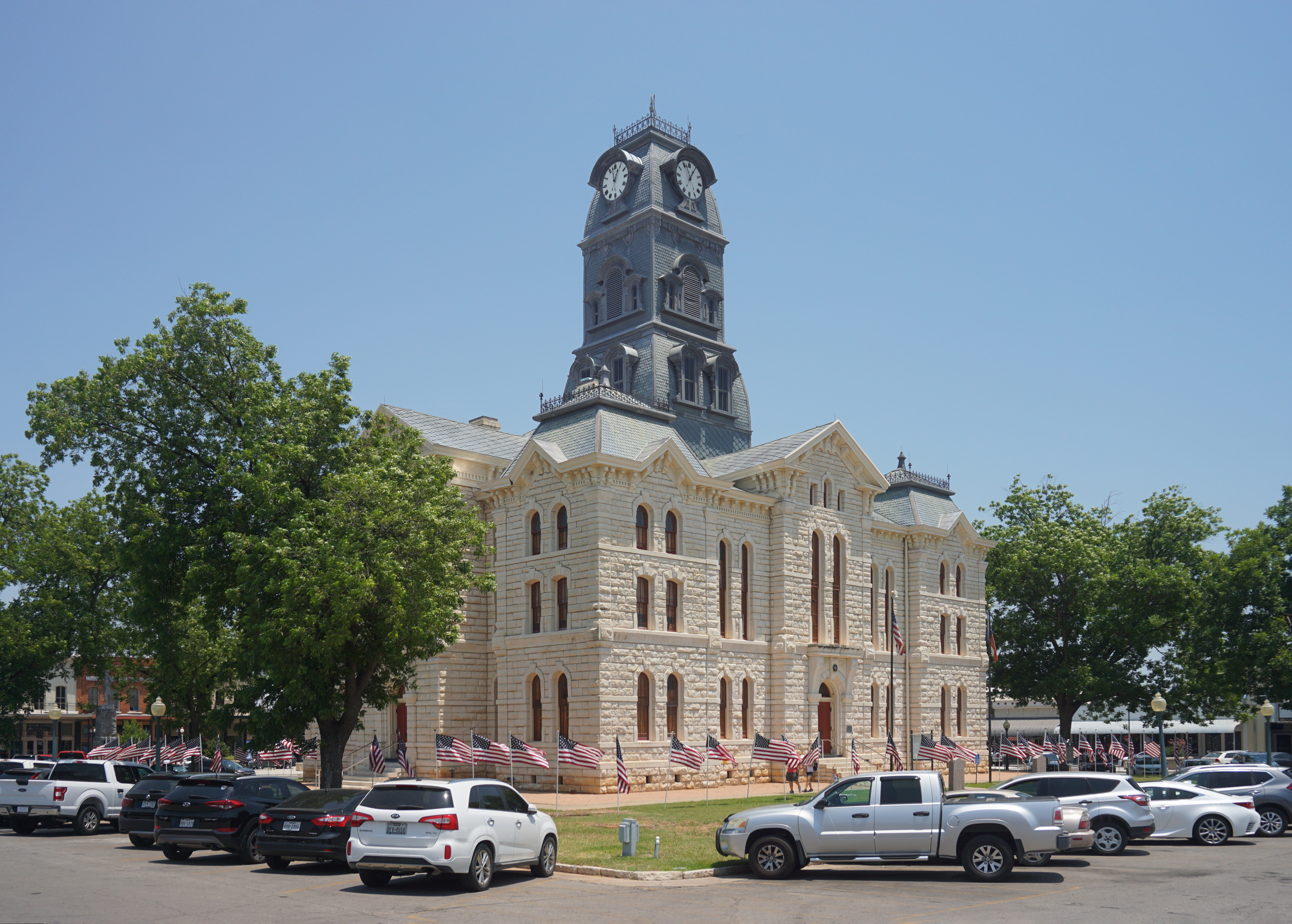
- Hood County Courthouse in 2018

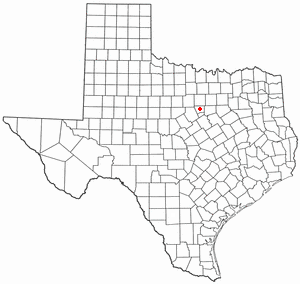
- Location of Granbury, Texas
- Coordinates: 32°26′31″N 97°45′53″W
- Country: United States
- State: Texas
- County: Hood

Area
  - Total: 16.97 sq mi (43.95 km^{2})
  - Land: 16.19 sq mi (41.92 km^{2})
  - Water: 0.78 sq mi (2.03 km^{2})
- Elevation: 735 ft (224 m)

Population (2020)
  - Total: 10,958
  - Density: 645.8/sq mi (249.33/km^{2})
- Time zone: UTC-6 (Central (CST))
  - Summer (DST): UTC-5 (CDT)
- ZIP codes: 76048-76049
- Area codes: 817, 682
- FIPS code: 48-30416
- GNIS feature ID: 2410629
- Website: www.granbury.org

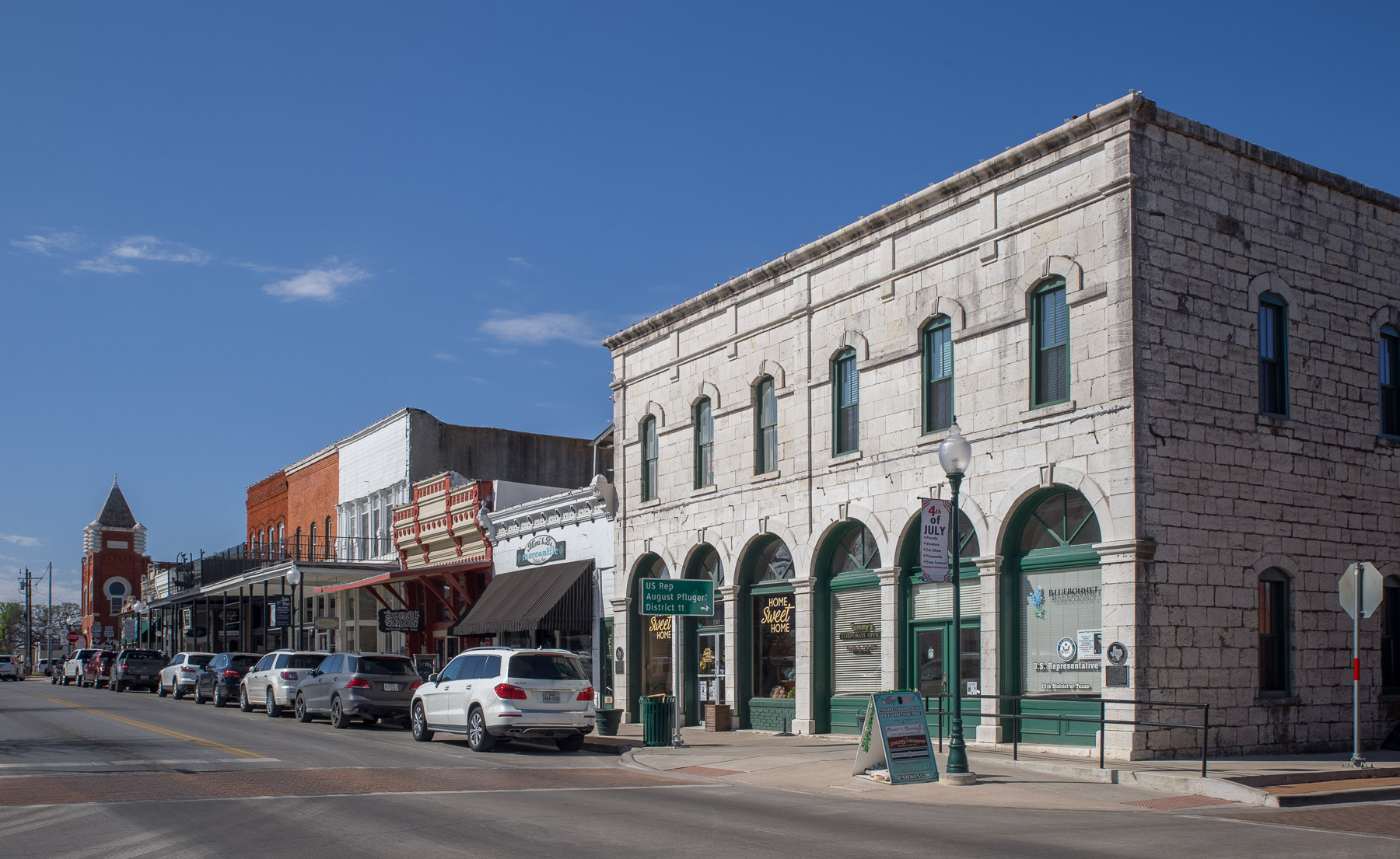
Granbury Town Square

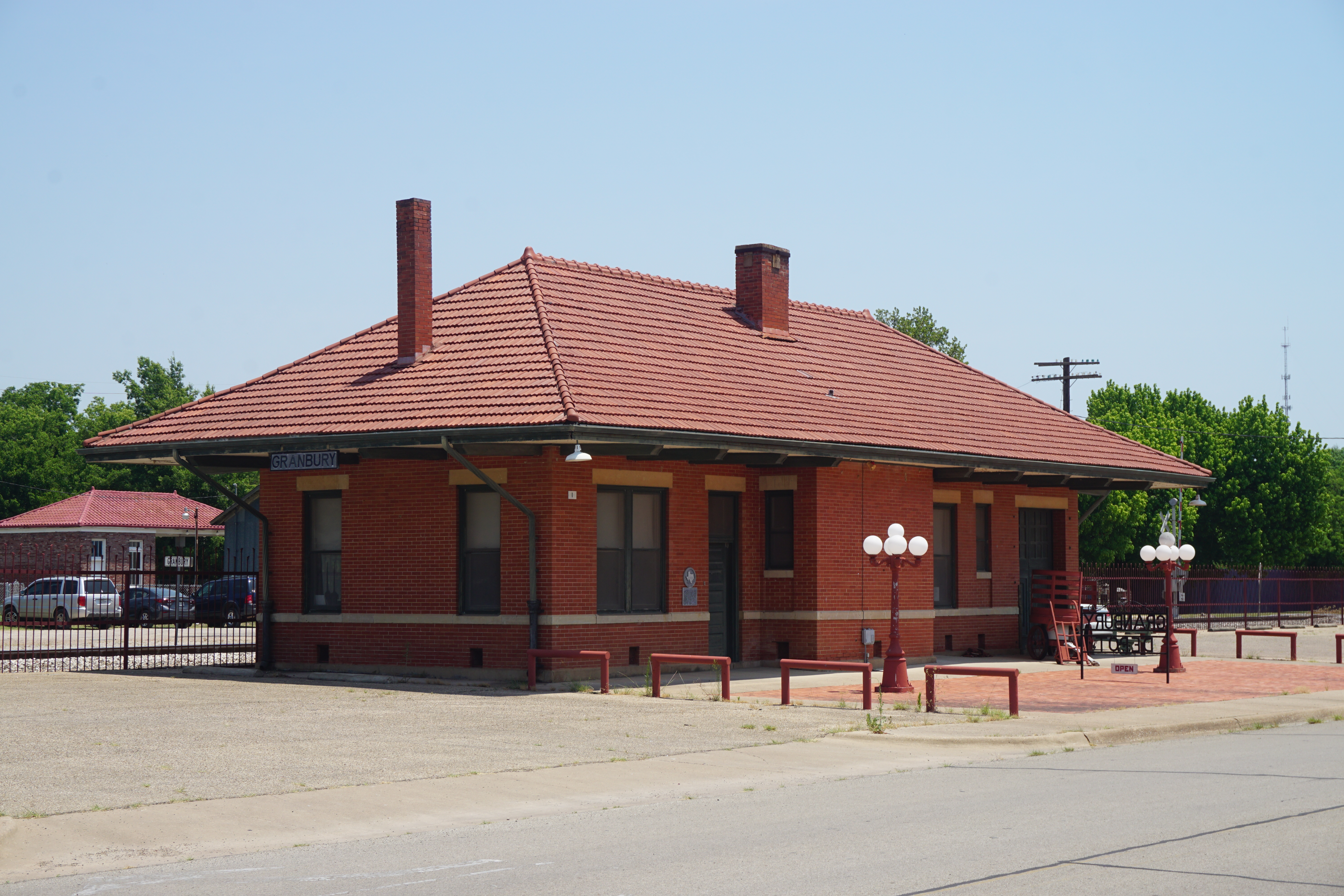
Granbury Railroad Depot

Granbury is a city in and the county seat of Hood County, Texas, United States. As of the 2020 census, the city's population was 10,958, and it is the principal city of the Granbury micropolitan statistical area. Granbury is named after Confederate General Hiram B. Granbury.

== History ==
Granbury started as a square and log cabin courthouse. Many buildings on the square are now registered historic landmarks, including the Granbury Opera House, which still hosts "Broadway" productions. The city's name originated from Confederate General Hiram B. Granberry. To explain why the city name is spelled differently, some scholars believe the name Granberry was misread on a document. Recent findings conclude that Granberry chose to spell his name Granbury.

The Fort Worth and Rio Grande Railway, building towards Brownwood from Fort Worth, reached Granbury in 1887. In the 20th century, the line was owned successively by the Frisco Railway, the Santa Fe Railway, and the South Orient Railroad before being acquired by the Fort Worth and Western Railroad in 1999.

A recent expansion of the city was made possible by building a Brazos River dam in 1969, which formed Lake Granbury, a long, narrow lake that flows through the city.

On May 15, 2013, a violent EF4 tornado struck the southeastern part of Granbury, leaving six confirmed deaths and at least 100 homes damaged. Approximately 48 injured people were treated at Lake Granbury Medical Center.

In July 2024, Time published an investigation into numerous noise and health complaints by Granbury residents, many of whom attributed their ailments to a bitcoin-mining facility located in Granbury owned by Marathon Digital Holdings.

== Geography ==
Granbury is located along US Route 377, about 30 miles southwest of Fort Worth. The Brazos River flows past the east side of the city within Lake Granbury. According to the United States Census Bureau, the city has a total area of 13.99 sq mi (36.23 km^{2}), of which 0.61 sq mi (1.58 km^{2}) is covered by water.

=== Climate ===
The climate in this area is characterized by hot, humid summers and generally mild to cool winters. According to the Köppen climate classification, Granbury has a humid subtropical climate, Cfa on climate maps.

== Demographics ==
Historical population
Census	Pop.	Note	%±
1880	524		—
1890	1,164		122.1%
1900	1,410		21.1%
1910	1,336		−5.2%
1920	1,364		2.1%
1930	996		−27.0%
1940	1,166		17.1%
1950	1,683		44.3%
1960	2,227		32.3%
1970	2,473		11.0%
1980	3,332		34.7%
1990	4,045		21.4%
2000	5,718		41.4%
2010	7,978		39.5%
2020	10,958		37.4%
U.S. Decennial Census

=== 2020 census ===
As of the 2020 census, Granbury had a population of 10,958. The median age was 51.5 years; 17.5% of residents were under 18 and 32.6% were 65 or older. For every 100 females, there were 87.2 males, and for every 100 females 18 and over, there were 82.2 males 18 and over.

About 89.3% of residents lived in urban areas, while 10.7% lived in rural areas.

Of the 4,852 households in Granbury, 22.0% had children under 18 living in them, 44.4% were married-couple households, 17.1% were households with a male householder and no spouse or partner present, and 33.6% were households with a female householder and no spouse or partner present. About 37.3% of all households were made up of individuals, and 22.3% had someone living alone who was 65 or older.

The city had 5,494 housing units, of which 11.7% were vacant. The homeowner vacancy rate was 1.9% and the rental vacancy rate was 9.3%.

Racial composition as of the 2020 census
Race	Number	Percentage
White	9,414	85.9%
Black or African American	110	1.0%
American Indian and Alaska Native	87	0.8%
Asian	196	1.8%
Native Hawaiian and other Pacific Islander	7	0.1%
Some other race	305	2.8%
Two or more races	839	7.7%
Hispanics or Latinos (of any race)	1,068	9.7%

=== 2010 census ===
As of the 2010 census, 7,978 people, 3,559 households, and 1,927 families were residing in the city. The population density was 619.1 people/sq mi (239.0/km^{2}). The 4,419 housing units averaged 342.9/sq mi (132.4/km^{2}). The city's racial makeup was 93.75% White, 0.71% African American, 0.71% Native American, 1.14% Asian or Pacific Islander, 2.11% from other races, and 1.58% from two or more races. Hispanics or Latinos of any race were 8.57% of the population.

Of the 3,559 households, 27.0% had children under 18 living with them, 48.4% were married couples, 9.5% had a female householder with no husband present, and 39.0% were not families. About 34.9% of all households were made up of individuals, and 18.7% had someone who was 65 or older living alone. The average household size was 2.20, and the average family size was 2.83. In the city, the age distribution was 21.0% under 18, 8.0% from 18 to 24, 25.6% from 25 to 44, 21.9% from 45 to 64, and 23.4% 65 or older. The median age was 42 years. For every 100 females, there were 83.4 males. For every 100 females ages 18 and over, there were 77.1 males.

The median income in the city for a household was $35,952 and for a family was $45,451. Males had a median income of $34,625 versus $25,721 for females. The per capita income for the city was $19,801. About 5.0% of families and 9.6% of the population were below the poverty line, including 4.6% of those under 18 and 14.9% of those 65 or over.

== Education ==
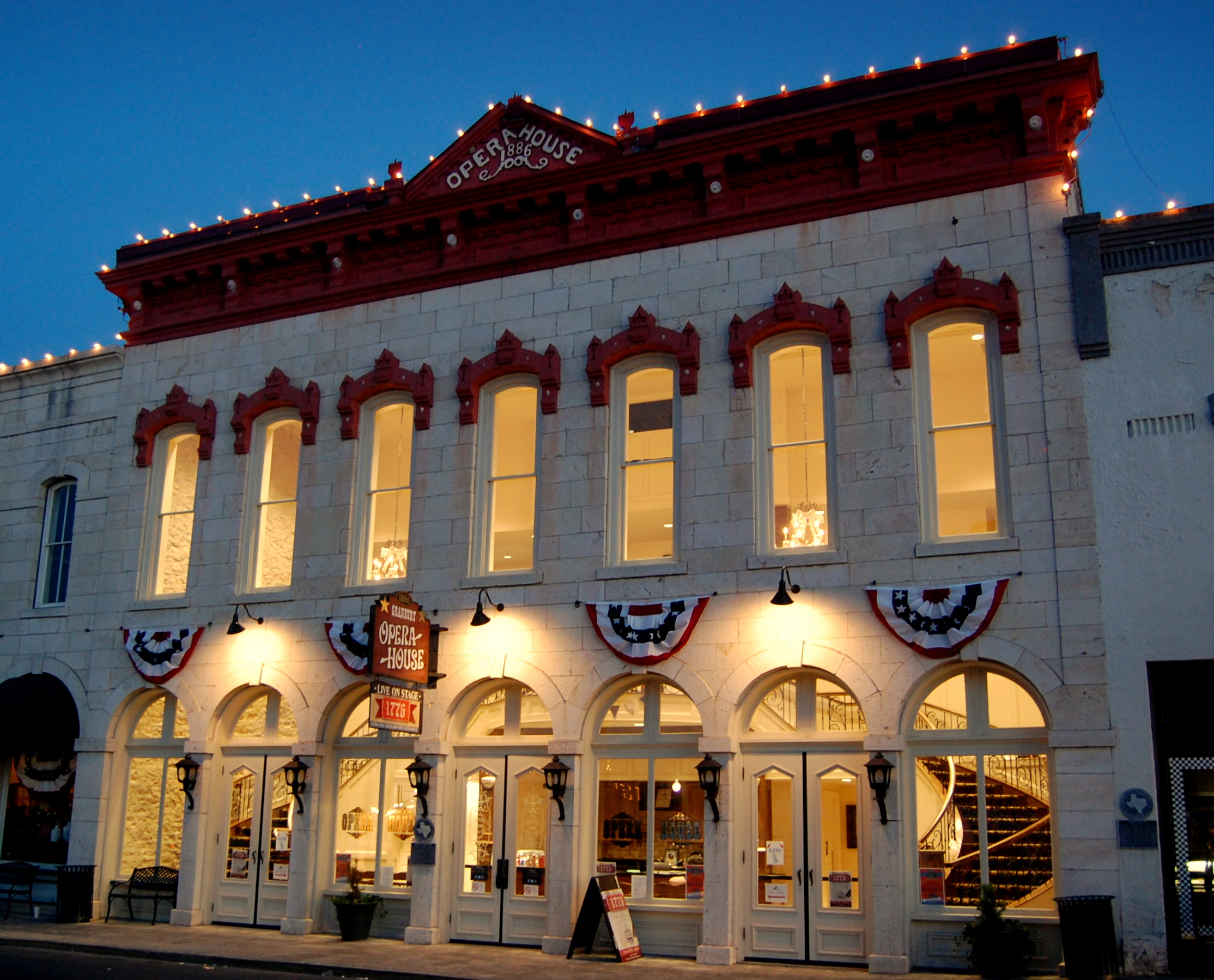
Granbury Opera House with patriotic decorations during Fourth of July festival

The Granbury Independent School District consists of 21 campuses. They include Granbury High School, STARS Academy, Behavior Transition Center, Granbury Middle School, Acton Middle School, Mambrino STEAM Academy, Brawner Intermediate, Oak Woods Elementary, Acton Elementary, Nettie Baccus Elementary, and Emma Roberson Elementary. Granbury has been a 5A district since 2008. Also, a Happy Hill Farm Academy home is in the district. In 1999, boys' soccer won the 4A state championship in Texas.

== Media ==
Granbury and Hood County are part of the Dallas/Fort Worth television media market in north-central Texas. Local news media outlets are KDFW-TV, KXAS-TV, WFAA-TV, KTVT-TV, KERA-TV, KTXA-TV, KDFI-TV, KDAF-TV, KFWD-TV, and KDTX-TV. Granbury is also served by a local Public Education and Government Access Channel Granbury TV. Two news media sources serve Hood County, Hood County Free Press, an online daily news publication, and the biweekly newspaper Hood County News. Granbury is also served by Tarleton State University's National Public Radio affiliate, KTRL 90.5 FM.

== Infrastructure ==
Granbury is served by Granbury Regional Airport (GDJ). The neighborhood of Pecan Plantation has a municipal airport that operates only recreational flights.

== Notable people ==
- Leta Andrews — high school basketball coach with the most wins in the country
- Brian Birdwell — Texas state senator, assumed this office in June 2010
- Cynthia Brants — artist and member of the Fort Worth Circle
- Bill Garrett — former PGA Tour golfer
- Peter Mayhew — British actor who played Chewbacca in the Star Wars films once lived in Granbury
- Andy Parker — drummer for the English rock group UFO resides in Granbury
- Jia Perkins — San Antonio Silver Stars basketball player
- Johnny Perkins — New York Giants football player; attended Granbury High School
- Drew Phillips — internet personality
- Nellie Gray Robertson — first female county attorney in Texas, was born in Granbury
- Shorty Rollins — racing driver
- Sue Schechter — member of the Texas House of Representatives (1991-1995)
- Dave Smith — former Oklahoma State Cowboys and SMU Mustangs head coach
- Gene Stephens — MLB outfielder
- Dana Vollmer — Olympic gold medal-winning swimmer
- Robert Williamson III — poker player, grew up in Granbury
