= Farm to Market Road 4 =

State road in Texas, United States

Farm to Market Road 4

Route information
- Maintained by TxDOT
- Length: 116.189 mi (186.988 km)
- Existed: March 26, 1942–present

Major junctions
- South end: SH 81 at Grandview
- SH 174 at Cleburne; US 67 at Cleburne; US 377 at Granbury; US 281 near Lipan; I-20 near Santo; US 180 at Palo Pinto; SH 254 near Graford; SH 337 at Graford
- North end: US 380 at Jacksboro

Location
- Country: United States
- State: Texas
- Counties: Johnson, Hood, Palo Pinto, Jack

Highway system
- Highways in Texas; Interstate; US; State; Former; Toll; Loops; Spurs; FM/RM; Park; Rec
← Loop 4	→ PR 4

Farm to Market Road 4 (FM 4) is a farm to market road in Texas, United States, maintained by the Texas Department of Transportation (TxDOT), that runs between the cities of Grandview and Jacksboro. The route was designated in March 1942. As of 2012, FM 4 is one of the longest farm to market roads in the state of Texas.

== Route description ==
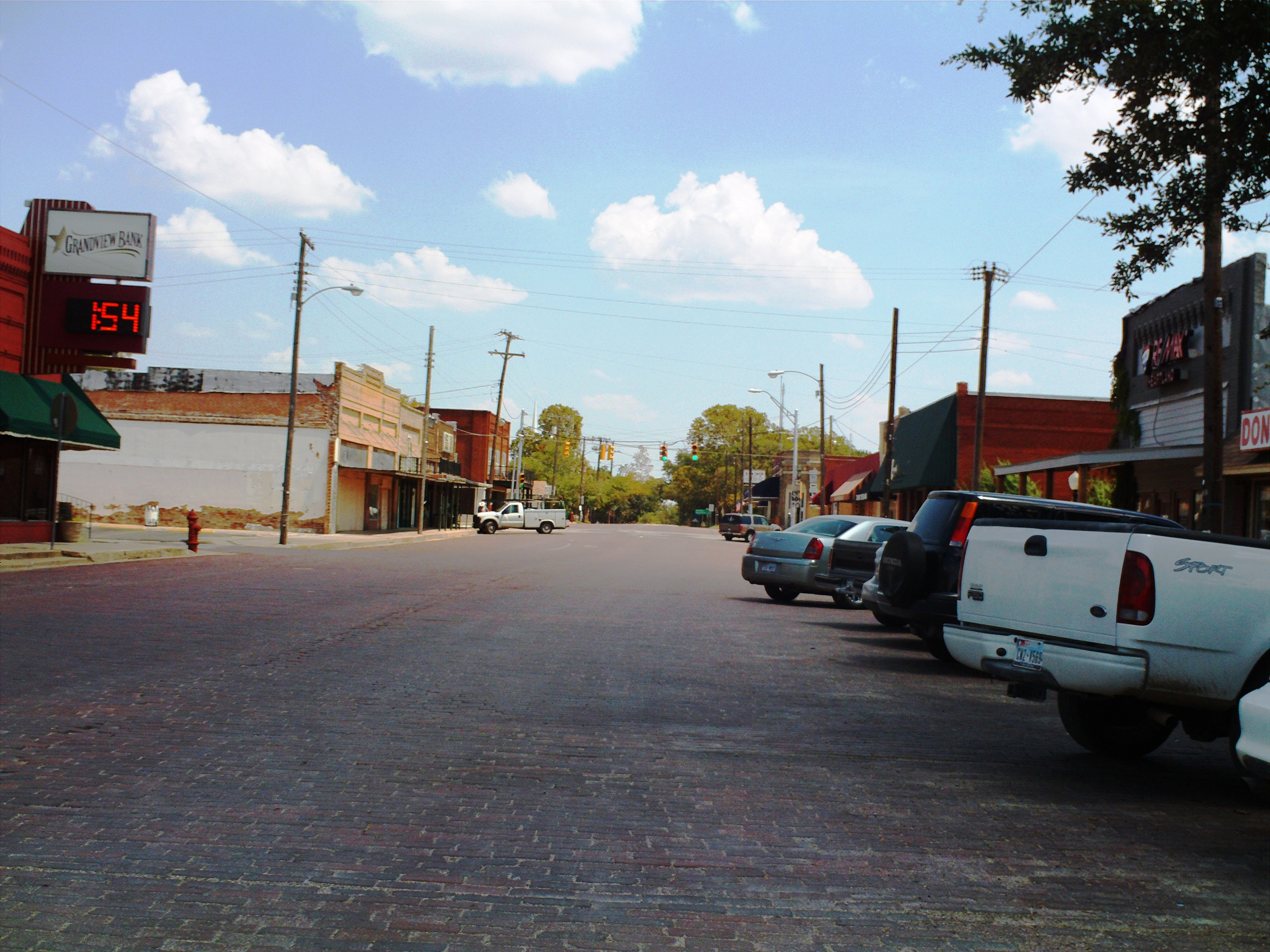
Looking east on southbound FM 4, near its southern terminus in Grandview, August 2010

The southern terminus of FM 4 is at Texas State Highway 81 (SH 81) in Grandview. FM 4 proceeds through the city and passes the Grandview Cemetery. It then passes through several small communities, including Sand Flat, before reaching the city of Cleburne, where it has a concurrency with SH 171/SH 174. FM 4 passes Cleburne Municipal Airport before exiting the city at its junction with US 67. It then proceeds through Acton, Granbury, Lipan, Santo, and Palo Pinto before reaching its northern terminus in Jacksboro.

== History ==
The route was designated on March 26, 1942, between Santo and U.S. Highway 80, replacing Spur 40. The route was extended north to the end of FM 130 in Lone Camp on July 11, 1945. The route was extended to U.S. Highway 180 on September 6, 1945, replacing FM 130. The route was extended southeast to Granbury on November 23, 1948, replacing FM 7. On February 6, 1953, the route had been extended north to a road intersection south of the Brazos River, replacing FM 1193. On October 7, 1955, the route had been extended north across the river to Graford, replacing FM 1194. On December 20, 1984, when the district combined several farm to market roads with other ones, FM 4 was extended north to Jacksboro, replacing FM 206. On February 25, 1985, an amendment to the previous request, FM 4 was extended south to then U.S. Highway 81 (now SH 81) at Grandview, replacing FM 208 and FM 110.

The Honda Sport Touring Association has named the section between Palo Pinto and Granbury, through the Palo Pinto Mountains, one of Texas' top ten roads for riding enjoyment and scenery.

== Major intersections ==
County	Location	mi	km	Destinations	Notes
Johnson	Grandview	0.0	0.0	SH 81 / FM 916 east	Southern terminus; Southern end of FM 916 concurrency
Johnson		1.0	1.6	FM 916 west – Rio Vista	Northern end of FM 916 concurrency
Johnson		9.5	15.3	FM 2415 east	
Johnson	Cleburne	12.0	19.3	FM 3136 north	
Johnson	Cleburne	12.7	20.4	FM 2135 south	
Johnson	Cleburne	13.6	21.9	SH 171 south / SH 174 south (S. Main Street) – Meridian, Hillsboro, Rio Vista	Southern end of SH 171/SH 174 concurrency
Johnson	Cleburne	14.1	22.7	Bus. US 67 east (E. Chambers Street)	
Johnson	Cleburne	14.1	22.7	Bus. US 67 west (E. Henderson Street)	Access to Texas Health Harris Methodist Hospital Cleburne
Johnson	Cleburne	15.7	25.3	SH 171 north / SH 174 north (N. Main Street)	Northern end of SH 171/SH 174 concurrency
Johnson	Cleburne	18.7	30.1	US 67	Interchange
Johnson		25.5	41.0	FM 2331 south – Bono	Southern end of FM 2331 concurrency
Johnson		26.3	42.3	FM 2331 north – Godley	Northern end of FM 2331 concurrency
Hood	Acton	35.5	57.1	FM 167 south (Fall Creek Highway)	Southern end of FM 167 concurrency
Hood	Acton	36.1	58.1	FM 167 north (Fall Creek Highway)	Northern end of FM 167 concurrency
Hood	Granbury	38.9	62.6	US 377 north / Meander Road – Fort Worth	Eastern end of US 377 concurrency
Hood	Granbury	40.9	65.8	US 377 north – Stephenville	Western end of US 377 concurrency
Hood	Granbury	41.2	66.3	Bus. US 377 (Pearl Street)	Eastern end of US 377 Bus. concurrency
Hood	Granbury	42.6	68.6	Bus. US 377 south (Pearl Street)	Western end of US 377 Bus. concurrency
Hood	Granbury	42.6	68.6	FM 51 south (North Houston Street)	Southern end of FM 51 concurrency
Hood	Granbury	43.1	69.4	FM 51 north (North Houston Street) – Weatherford	Northern end of FM 51 concurrency
Hood	Thorp Spring	46.4	74.7	FM 2580 north (Tin Top Highway)	
Hood		57.1	91.9	FM 1543 north (Rocky Branch Highway) – Dennis	
Hood	Lipan	61	98	FM 1189 north (Dennis Road) – Dennis	Eastern end of FM 1189 concurrency
Hood	Lipan	61.2	98.5	FM 1189 south (S. Caddo Street) – Morgan Mill	Western end of FM 1189 concurrency
Palo Pinto		65.9	106.1	US 281 – Stephenville, Mineral Wells	
Palo Pinto		68.9	110.9	FM 2803 south – Patillo	
Palo Pinto		72.4	116.5	I-20 – Abilene, Fort Worth	I-20 exit 380
Palo Pinto	Santo	75.1	120.9	FM 2201 east	
Palo Pinto	Santo	75.4	121.3	FM 129 north – Brazos	
Palo Pinto		81.5	131.2	RM 3137 west – Lake Palo Pinto Causeway	
Palo Pinto	Palo Pinto	89.1	143.4	US 180 west – Breckenridge	Western end of US 180 concurrency
Palo Pinto	Palo Pinto	89.6	144.2	US 180 east – Mineral Wells	Eastern end of US 180 concurrency
Palo Pinto		102.5	165.0	SH 254 west – Graham	Western end of SH 254 concurrency
Palo Pinto	Graford	103.3	166.2	SH 337 to US 180 – Graham	
Palo Pinto	Graford	104.0	167.4	SH 254 east (West Lee Avenue)	Eastern end of SH 254 concurrency
Palo Pinto	Graford	104.1	167.5	Spur 397 east (Powell Avenue)	
Jack		114.0	183.5	FM 2210 east (Bartons Chapel Road) – Perrin	
Jack		124.6	200.5	US 380 – Graham, Jacksboro	Northern terminus
1.000 mi = 1.609 km; 1.000 km = 0.621 mi

Note that the total mileage when listed by junctions does not agree with the total mileage certified by the Texas Department of Transportation because the number given by TxDOT does not include concurrencies.

== See also ==
- List of Farm to Market Roads in Texas
