= Texas State Highway 174 =

State highway in Texas

State Highway 174
- SH 174, highlighted in red

Route information
- Maintained by TxDOT
- Length: 50.208 mi (80.802 km)
- Existed: 1932–present

Major junctions
- South end: SH 22 in Meridian
- SH 171 in Cleburne; US 67 in Cleburne
- North end: I-35W in Burleson

Location
- Country: United States
- State: Texas
- Counties: Bosque, Hill, Johnson

Highway system
- Highways in Texas; Interstate; US; State; Former; Toll; Loops; Spurs; FM/RM; Park; Rec
← SH 173	→ US 175

State Highway 174 (SH 174) is a state highway in Texas that connects Meridian and Burleson.

== Route description ==
SH 174 begins in Bosque County at an intersection with SH 22 in Meridian. The route travels northward out of the city and through Morgan. It briefly enters Hill County, passing to the north of Lake Whitney and the town of Blum, before crossing into Johnson County. Heading north into Cleburne, SH 174 has agreement with SH 171 and FM 4 through the city's downtown, where the routes cross Bus. US 67. After separating from SH 171 and FM 4, SH 174 has an interchange with the US 67 expressway before heading northward out of the city. The route passes through Joshua and curves to the northeast into Burleson, where SH 174 ends at an interchange with Interstate 35W.

== History ==
The original routing of SH 174 was designated on August 4, 1932, from Iredell to Walnut Springs. On October 22, 1935, it was extended to Cleburne, replacing what was previously SH 144T. On September 26, 1939, it was extended to the former US 81 near Burleson, replacing part of SH 2A. On December 3, 1940, SH 353 was designated on a newly proposed road from Cleburne to Meridian, with the section of SH 353 that does not include the bridge across the Brazos River and the section of SH 174 from Cleburne to Iredell being cancelled upon completion of the bridge across the Brazos River. On June 11, 1945, FM 167 was designated from Cleburne to the Hill–Johnson county line, and from the Hill–Bosque county line in Morgan to Meridian, but SH 353 was not cancelled. On August 23, 1945, FM 167 was extended from the Hill–Johnson county line to the Hill–Bosque county line in Morgan, closing the gap. SH 353 was cancelled because the route was identical to the route of FM 167. On September 27, 1946, FM 167 was changed back to SH 353. On June 29, 1950, the bridge was completed on SH 353, and when adequate facilities for highway travel were built on SH 353, SH 353 was to become part of SH 174. The old route of SH 174 from Cleburne to Iredell was to be cancelled. On August 20, 1952, work was completed; SH 174 was rerouted along SH 353 from Cleburne to Meridian, while the former segment from Iredell to Walnut Springs was transferred to FM 927 and PR 21, with the rest being given to the counties.

== Major intersections ==
County	Location	mi	km	Destinations	Notes
Bosque	Meridian	0.0	0.0	SH 22 – Hamilton, Hillsboro	Southern terminus
Bosque	Meridian	0.2	0.32	FM 2840	
Bosque	Morgan	7.5	12.1	FM 927 west – Walnut Springs	South end of FM 927 concurrency
Bosque	Morgan	7.7	12.4	FM 927 east	North end of FM 927 concurrency
Bosque		13.3	21.4	FM 56 north – Brazos Point	South end of FM 56 concurrency
Bosque		14.7	23.7	FM 56 south – Kopperl	North end of FM 56 concurrency
Hill		23.6	38.0	FM 933 – Blum	
Johnson	Rio Vista	29.2	47.0	FM 916 east – Grandview	South end of FM 916 concurrency
Johnson	Rio Vista	29.6	47.6	FM 916 west	North end of FM 916 concurrency
Johnson	Cleburne	36.0	57.9	SH 171 south – Covington	South end of SH 171 concurrency
Johnson	Cleburne	36.8	59.2	FM 1718	
Johnson	Cleburne	37.0	59.5	FM 4 east (East Second Street) – Grandview	South end of FM 4 concurrency
Johnson	Cleburne	37.5	60.4	Bus. US 67 (Henderson Street)	
Johnson	Cleburne	39.2	63.1	FM 4 west	North end of FM 4 concurrency
Johnson	Cleburne	39.3	63.2	SH 171 north (Weatherford Highway) – Godley, Weatherford	North end of SH 171 concurrency
Johnson	Cleburne	40.0	64.4	US 67 – Stephenville, Midlothian	
Johnson	Cleburne	42.9	69.0	FM 3048	
Johnson	Joshua	45.7	73.5	FM 917 – Godley	
Johnson	Burleson	50.4	81.1	FM 731 – Crowley, Cross Timber	
Johnson	Burleson	52.5	84.5	Spur 50 (Renfro Street)	
Johnson	Burleson	53.1	85.5	I-35W – Fort Worth, Waco	Northern terminus
1.000 mi = 1.609 km; 1.000 km = 0.621 mi
