= David's Supermarkets =

Supermarket chain

David's Supermarkets, Inc.
- Company type: Private
- Industry: Retail (Grocery)
- Founded: 1964
- Defunct: 2014 (Brookshire Brothers acquisition finalized)
- Fate: acquired by Brookshire Brothers
- Headquarters: Grandview, Texas, USA
- Number of locations: 25
- Key people: Robert Waldrip; Charles Waldrip
- Products: meats, dairy, produce, general merchandise
- Number of employees: 550 (2014)
- Divisions: David's; David's Express; Pecan Foods

David's Supermarkets (often shortened to David's) was an independently owned supermarket chain headquartered in Grandview, Texas, United States. Founded in 1964, David's operated 25 stores in North Central Texas and Northeast Texas, concentrated in very small communities not served by other chains.

David's was acquired by Brookshire Brothers in April 2014.

== History ==
David's Supermarkets was founded in 1964 by David Waldrip with the opening of a grocery store in Milford, Texas. Prior to 2014, the chain of stores most recently had been based in Grandview, Texas, where the company operated a distribution center.

By February 2014, talks were underway for Brookshire Brothers, a grocery chain based in Lufkin, Texas, to acquire David's. In early April, the deal was completed. Ten of the David's locations, including a David's Express and the Pecan Foods store would have their names remain, while the other 15 will have the Brookshire Brothers name.

== Competitive Strategies for Small Town Supermarkets ==
In recent years, the business focus of David's has been the competition with large discount retailers, such as Wal-Mart stores. For the majority of David's Supermarket locations, a Wal-Mart store, with a discount grocery department, is within driving proximity. The discounting strategy at Wal-Mart stores remains the most significant challenge for smaller community markets. The small supermarkets have found their survival strategy is local community identification, as well as convenience of location and parking, the butcher-style meat counter, farmers market-style produce merchandising, personality and recognizability of the local store personnel, competitive pricing and merchandising, and home delivery of customer orders. Other major grocery competitors in close proximity to David's Supermarket locations include H-E-B, Albertsons, Kroger, Winn-Dixie (until 2002 when the Texas Winn-Dixie stores were liquidated), Minyard Food Stores, Randalls and Piggly Wiggly.

== In popular culture ==
In early April 2014, during a special week of shows in Dallas, Conan O'Brien, host of TBS' Conan, visited Johnson County, south of Fort Worth, to put together a video for the late-night talk show. One segment focused on O'Brien in character as a Johnson County deputy scoping out the David's Supermarket location in Alvarado. During his surveillance, he scared customers, as well as checking up on reports that the store was selling candy bars past their expiration date.

== Locations ==
- Acton
- Alvarado
- Clifton
- Crandall
- Dublin
- Edgewood
- Ferris
- Glen Rose
- Godley
- Grandview
- Granbury (two locations)
1. a David's Supermarket store
2. a "Pecan Foods" store
- Hamilton
- Hubbard
- Italy
- Itasca
- Kaufman
- Maypearl
- Meridian
- Moody
- Princeton
- Seven Points
- Venus
- Whitesboro
- Whitney

== See also ==
- Brookshire Brothers
- List of supermarket chains in the United States
