= Parker, Johnson County, Texas =

Parker, Texas
- Unincorporated community
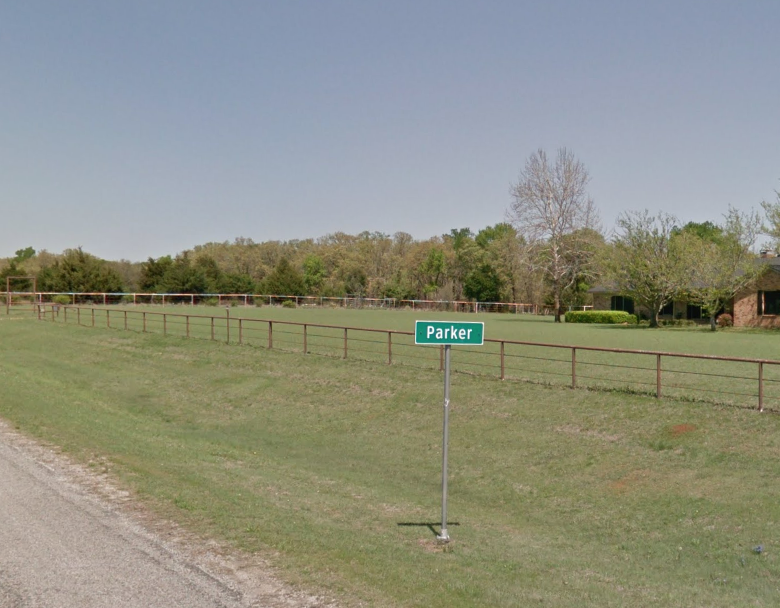
- Entrance into Parker

- Location within Texas Location within the United States
- Coordinates: 32.2440365°N 97.2811243°W
- Country: United States
- State: Texas
- County: Johnson
- Elevation: 830 ft (253 m)
- Time zone: UTC-6 (Central (CST))
  - Summer (DST): UTC-5 (CDT)
- ZIP Code: 76050
- Area codes: 817, 682
- GNIS feature ID: 1343593

Parker is an unincorporated community in southeastern Johnson County, Texas, United States, located on Texas State Highway 171.

== History ==
Families had settled in the area as far back as the 1850s, but a community would only form in the 1880s. A post office called Nathan operated from 1887 to 1906. A nondenominational church moved to the community in 1900 and would later transition to a Methodist place of worship. In 1904, the Trinity and Brazos Valley Railway passed through the area, connecting Parker with Cleburne and Hillsboro. Residents of Nathan wanted to change the name to Kennard, after A. D. Kennard, Jr, who donated land in the town. However, they decided against it because there already was a town in Texas named Kennard and instead decided to name it Parker, in honor of the president of the railroad which had grown the town's population to 100 by 1914. Parker was named before Parker, Collin County, Texas. The New Hope School moved two miles south to Parker and had an enrollment of 51 students with just one teacher in 1905. The school would later be annexed by the Grandview Independent School District in 1963. A fire and cyclone would hit the town in 1914, causing significant damage. Later, in 1927, the town's cotton gin burned. Families began moving eastward, and the population declined from 110 and three businesses in 1933 to 30 and two stores in 1943, further decreasing to 21 in the 1960s. The population did grow in the following years, with an estimate of 93 in 2009.

== Transportation ==
Cow Pasture Airport (FAA code: TE16) is a private-use airport one mile northwest of Parker.
