= Smith Ranch =

- U.S. National Register of Historic Places
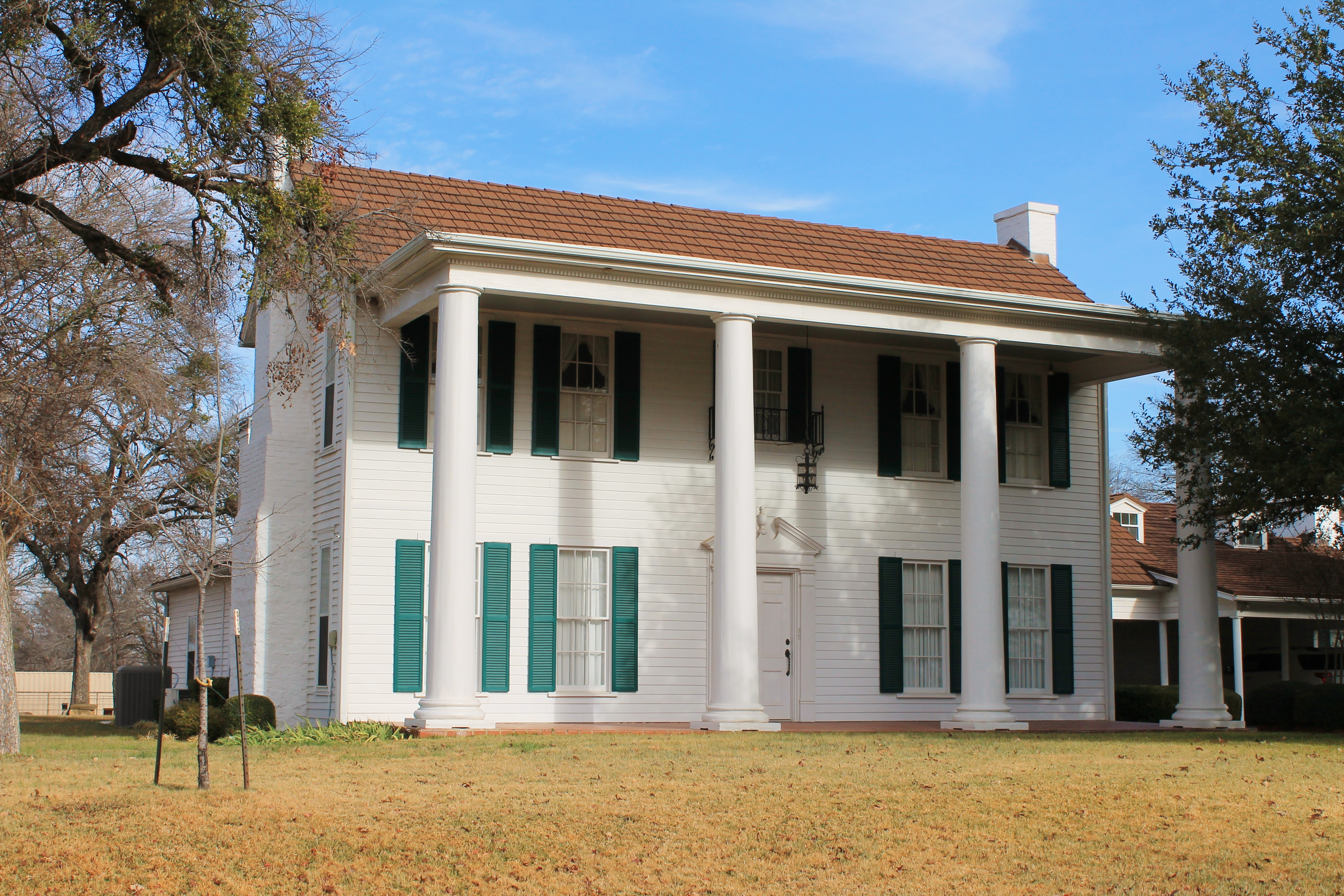

- Location within Texas Location within the United States
- Nearest city: Rio Vista, Texas
- Coordinates: 32°14′05″N 97°24′33″W
- Area: 2,336.2 acres (945.4 ha)
- Built: 1887
- Built by: John Wesley Smith
- NRHP reference No.: 07000271
- Added to NRHP: April 3, 2007

The Smith Ranch, in Johnson County, Texas near Rio Vista, Texas, and also known as Grand Valley Lands, was established in 1887. It was listed on the National Register of Historic Places in 2007.

The listed property is 2,336.2 acres (945.4 ha) in area and includes six contributing buildings, two contributing structures, and three contributing sites.

It includes a Recorded Texas Historic Landmark.

The main house is a two-story house built in 1887, using square nails.

German prisoners-of-war, from the Afrika Corps, worked on the farm.

It is located on FM 916, 1 mile (1.6 km) west of TX 174.
