= National Register of Historic Places listings in Johnson County, Texas =

Location of Johnson County in Texas

This is a list of the National Register of Historic Places listings in Johnson County, Texas.

This is intended to be a complete list of properties and districts listed on the National Register of Historic Places in Johnson County, Texas. There are two districts and six individual properties listed on the National Register in the county. Four individually listed properties are Recorded Texas Historic Landmarks including three of which that are also designated as State Antiquities Landmarks. The district contains an additional Recorded Texas Historic Landmark.

This National Park Service list is complete through NPS recent listings posted March 21, 2025.

== Current listings ==
The publicly disclosed locations of National Register properties and districts may be seen in a mapping service provided.

	Name on the Register	Image	Date listed	Location	City or town	Description
1	Cleburne Carnegie Library	Cleburne Carnegie Library	December 12, 1976 (#76002042)	201 N. Caddo St. 32°20′54″N 97°23′11″W	Cleburne	State Antiquities Landmark, Recorded Texas Historic Landmark
2	Cleburne Downtown Historic District	Cleburne Downtown Historic District	August 31, 2018 (#100002844)	Roughly bounded by Brown, Border, Harrell & Buffalo Sts. 32°20′51″N 97°23′12″W	Cleburne	
3	Ham Creek Site	Ham Creek Site	February 15, 1974 (#74002082)	Address restricted	Rio Vista	
4	Meredith Hart House	Meredith Hart House	April 13, 1977 (#77001456)	E of Rio Vista on SR 916; 32°14′20″N 97°21′27″W	Rio Vista	Recorded Texas Historic Landmark
5	Johnson County Courthouse	Johnson County Courthouse	April 14, 1988 (#88000439)	1 Public Sq. 32°20′50″N 97°23′10″W	Cleburne	State Antiquities Landmark, Recorded Texas Historic Landmark
6	Joiner-Long House	Joiner-Long House	June 23, 2003 (#03000558)	604 Prairie Av. 32°20′23″N 97°23′29″W	Cleburne	State Antiquities Landmark, Recorded Texas Historic Landmark
7	Smith Ranch	Smith Ranch	April 3, 2007 (#07000271)	FM 916, 1 mi (1.6 km). W of TX 174; 32°14′05″N 97°24′33″W	Rio Vista	Includes Recorded Texas Historic Landmark
8	Wright Building	Wright Building	March 17, 2009 (#09000139)	1 East James Street; 32°20′47″N 97°23′09″W	Cleburne	

== See also ==
- National Register of Historic Places listings in Texas
- Recorded Texas Historic Landmarks in Johnson County
