= The Homesteads, Texas =

- Census-designated place
- Location within Texas Location within the United States
- Coordinates: 32°28′32″N 97°09′58″W
- Country: United States
- State: Texas
- County: Johnson

Area
  - Total: 3.82 sq mi (9.89 km^{2})
  - Land: 3.82 sq mi (9.89 km^{2})
  - Water: 0 sq mi (0.0 km^{2})
- Elevation: 696 ft (212 m)
- Time zone: UTC-6 (Central (CST))
  - Summer (DST): UTC-5 (CDT)
- ZIP Code: 76009 (Alvarado)
- Area codes: 817, 682
- FIPS code: 48-72581
- GNIS feature ID: 2805799

The Homesteads is an unincorporated community and census-designated place (CDP) in Johnson County, Texas, United States. It was first listed as a CDP prior to the 2020 census. As of the 2020 census, The Homesteads had a population of 3,890.

It is in the northeastern part of the county, 7 miles (11 km) northeast of Alvarado, 14 miles (23 km) west of Midlothian, 8 miles (13 km) south-southwest of Mansfield, and 13 miles (21 km) southeast of Burleson. Downtown Fort Worth is 25 miles (40 km) to the north-northwest.

== Demographics ==
Historical population
Census	Pop.	Note	%±
2020	3,890		—
U.S. Decennial Census; 1850–1900 1910; 1920 1930 1940; 1950 1960 1970; 1980 1990 2000; 2010 2020

The Homesteads first appeared as a census designated place in the 2020 U.S. census.

=== 2020 census ===
As of the 2020 census, The Homesteads had a population of 3,890. The median age was 34.4 years. 27.8% of residents were under the age of 18 and 9.8% of residents were 65 years of age or older. For every 100 females there were 105.5 males, and for every 100 females age 18 and over there were 107.2 males age 18 and over.

0.0% of residents lived in urban areas, while 100.0% lived in rural areas.

There were 1,133 households in The Homesteads, of which 43.0% had children under the age of 18 living in them. Of all households, 56.7% were married-couple households, 18.6% were households with a male householder and no spouse or partner present, and 18.5% were households with a female householder and no spouse or partner present. About 18.6% of all households were made up of individuals and 7.2% had someone living alone who was 65 years of age or older.

There were 1,221 housing units, of which 7.2% were vacant. The homeowner vacancy rate was 1.4% and the rental vacancy rate was 3.8%.

The Homesteads CDP, Texas – Racial and ethnic composition Note: the US Census treats Hispanic/Latino as an ethnic category. This table excludes Latinos from the racial categories and assigns them to a separate category. Hispanics/Latinos may be of any race.
Race / Ethnicity (NH = Non-Hispanic)	Pop 2020	% 2020
White alone (NH)	1,167	30.00%
Black or African American alone (NH)	28	0.72%
Native American or Alaska Native alone (NH)	20	0.51%
Asian alone (NH)	14	0.36%
Native Hawaiian or Pacific Islander alone (NH)	2	0.05%
Other race alone (NH)	19	0.49%
Mixed race or Multiracial (NH)	99	2.54%
Hispanic or Latino (any race)	2,541	65.32%
Total	3,890	100.00%
