= Arnottville, Texas =

Ghost town in Texas, US

- Ghost town
- Location in Texas
- Coordinates: 32.04539000°N 97.15688000°W
- Country: United States
- State: Texas
- County: Hill

Arnottville is a ghost town in Hill County, Texas, United States. It is situated on Texas State Highway 171, about 3 miles north of Hillsboro. The town was named after local rancher Albert M. Arnott, who kept cattle in his nearby 2,000 acres. He also donated half an acre of land for a church and school. In 1905, the school had 59 students. Before its abandonment by the 1980s, cowboys used the community as a place to sleep while on nearby cattle trails.
