= Coyote Flats, Texas =

- City
- Interactive map of Coyote Flats, Texas
- Location within Texas Location within the United States
- Coordinates: 32°21′13″N 97°17′40″W
- Country: United States
- State: Texas
- County: Johnson

Area
  - Total: 3.36 sq mi (8.71 km^{2})
  - Land: 3.33 sq mi (8.62 km^{2})
  - Water: 0.035 sq mi (0.09 km^{2})
- Elevation: 876 ft (267 m)

Population (2020)
  - Total: 345
  - Density: 104/sq mi (40.0/km^{2})
- Time zone: UTC-6 (Central (CST))
  - Summer (DST): UTC-5 (CDT)
- ZIP code: 76031 (Cleburne)
- Area codes: 817, 682
- FIPS code: 48-17429
- GNIS feature ID: 2663677
- Website: www.coyoteflatstx.gov

Coyote Flats is a city in Johnson County in the U.S. state of Texas. As of the 2020 census, the population was 345.

== History ==
In 2009, the city of Keene wanted to annex seven parcels of land to its south, but was met with strong opposition from the parcels' residents. Judge John Neill of the 18th District Court subsequently blocked the annexation of three of the seven parcels on the grounds that they were outside of Keene's extraterritorial jurisdiction. On March 10, 2010, 25 residents petitioned a specially called meeting of the Johnson County Commissioners Court to become incorporated as a municipality. The name "Coyote Flats" was submitted at the meeting.

An election to incorporate the City of Coyote Flats was held on May 8, 2010. The measure was approved by a vote of 76 to 11. John Barnett was sworn in as mayor on August 11.

Mayor John Barnett presented Jim McHale and Theo Embry with plaques of appreciation, recognizing their dedicated work to help establish the city of Coyote Flats in spring and summer 2010.

== Geography ==
Coyote Flats is 6 miles (10 km) east of Cleburne, 4 miles (6 km) south of Keene, and 7 miles (11 km) southwest of Alvarado. Downtown Fort Worth is 30 miles (48 km) to the north; downtown Dallas is 40.7 miles (65.5 km) northeast.

According to the United States Census Bureau, Coyote Flats has a total land area of 3.329 square miles (8.62 km^{2}) and a total water area of 0.035 square miles (0.091 km^{2}).

== Demographics ==
Coyote Flats first appeared as a census designated place in the 2010 U.S. census. Despite incorporation, it was still listed as a CDP in the 2020 U.S. census.

=== Racial and ethnic composition ===
Coyote Flats CDP, Texas – Racial and ethnic composition Note: the US Census treats Hispanic/Latino as an ethnic category. This table excludes Latinos from the racial categories and assigns them to a separate category. Hispanics/Latinos may be of any race.
Race / Ethnicity (NH = Non-Hispanic)	Pop 2010	Pop 2020	% 2010	% 2020
White alone (NH)	289	293	92.63%	84.93%
Black or African American alone (NH)	1	5	0.32%	1.45%
Native American or Alaska Native alone (NH)	0	3	0.00%	0.87%
Asian alone (NH)	0	2	0.00%	0.57%
Pacific Islander alone (NH)	0	0	0.00%	0.00%
Other race alone (NH)	0	1	0.00%	0.29%
Mixed race or Multiracial (NH)	1	16	0.32%	4.64%
Hispanic or Latino (any race)	21	25	6.73%	7.25%
Total	312	345	100.00%	100.00%

=== 2020 census ===
As of the 2020 census, Coyote Flats had a population of 345. The median age was 47.1 years. 21.7% of residents were under the age of 18 and 19.1% of residents were 65 years of age or older. For every 100 females there were 106.6 males, and for every 100 females age 18 and over there were 107.7 males age 18 and over.

0.0% of residents lived in urban areas, while 100.0% lived in rural areas.

There were 132 households in Coyote Flats, of which 35.6% had children under the age of 18 living in them. Of all households, 60.6% were married-couple households, 12.9% were households with a male householder and no spouse or partner present, and 14.4% were households with a female householder and no spouse or partner present. About 6.8% of all households were made up of individuals and 5.3% had someone living alone who was 65 years of age or older.

There were 139 housing units, of which 5.0% were vacant. The homeowner vacancy rate was 0.9% and the rental vacancy rate was 0.0%.

Racial composition as of the 2020 census
Race	Number	Percent
White	304	88.1%
Black or African American	5	1.4%
American Indian and Alaska Native	3	0.9%
Asian	2	0.6%
Native Hawaiian and Other Pacific Islander	0	0.0%
Some other race	7	2.0%
Two or more races	24	7.0%
Hispanic or Latino (of any race)	25	7.2%
