= Gathings =

Gathings could refer to:

- Danny Gathings (born 1980), American basketball player
- Ezekiel Gathings (1903–1979), American politician
- Gathings College, now part of the Covington Independent School District in Covington, Texas, United States
