= Texas State Highway 81 =

State highway in Hill and Johnson counties in Texas, United States

State Highway 81
- SH 81 highlighted in red

Route information
- Maintained by TxDOT
- Length: 23.354 mi (37.585 km)
- Existed: 1991–present

Major junctions
- South end: I-35 / US 77 at Hillsboro
- North end: I-35W north of Grandview

Location
- Country: United States
- State: Texas
- Counties: Hill, Johnson

Highway system
- Highways in Texas; Interstate; US; State; Former; Toll; Loops; Spurs; FM/RM; Park; Rec
← US 81	→ US 82

State Highway 81 (SH 81) is a Texas state highway that runs from Hillsboro to Grandview. It was designated in 1991 to replace U.S. Highway 81, which was decommissioned south of Fort Worth.

== Route description ==
SH 81 begins along the ramp from northbound I-35's exit 364B; the route is accessible from the southbound freeway at exit 364A for FM 310. It travels north into Hillsboro along Abbott Avenue. SH 81 has a half-mile concurrency with SH 22/SH 171 through the city's downtown before continuing northward along Waco Street. At the northern edge of Hillsboro, the highway has an interchange with Spur 579, which provides access to I-35, as well as US 77, just south of the point at which the freeway splits into I-35W and I-35E. North of Hillsboro, SH 81 roughly parallels I-35W, which lies to the east. While the freeway bypasses the cities of Itasca and Grandview, SH 81 enters them directly, along Hill Street and 3rd Street, respectively. In Grandview, it intersects FM 916 and also FM 4 at that route's southern terminus before continuing northward to its end at I-35W's exit 16; the roadway continues as County Road 201A.

== History ==
=== Current route ===
As a majority of US 81 south of Fort Worth had already been superseded by the Interstate 35 freeway south of Fort Worth, the entire segment of that route from Fort Worth to Laredo was eliminated on March 26, 1991. Many of the former pre-freeway alignments that were kept as part of the state highway system were replaced by various routes, including state highway loops and business routes of Interstate 35. SH 81 was designated to replace the segment in Hill and Johnson counties, and represents the longest section south of Fort Worth with which US 81 did not have a concurrency with Interstate 35.

=== Pre-1939 route ===
The first highway designated SH 81 was originally proposed as a route through central Texas on August 21, 1923, beginning in Bandera and traveling south then turning southeast through San Antonio, with a final ending point at Cuero, replacing SH 29B and part of SH 27. On October 12, 1925, SH 81 had extended to Kerrville, but this was not taken over by the state until January 1, 1926. On March 19, 1930, SH 81 had been extended north to De Leon, replacing SH 124 and portions of SH 20 and SH 22. On June 20, 1933, the section east of San Antonio was transferred to SH 27. On December 22, 1936, SH 81 was extended north to Strawn. On February 19, 1937, the section from San Antonio to Kerrville was replaced by SH 16. On February 21, 1938, SH 81 Business was designated in Goldthwaite. On September 26, 1939, the entire route north of Kerrville had also been transferred to SH 16 (though the original plan was to extend south to San Antonio over part of SH 16 and north to Graham over part of SH 120, but this was scrapped because it would have crossed US 81). SH 81 was instead reassigned to a road from Llano to Brady (formerly Texas State Highway no. "F"; proposed as SH 283). SH 81 Business was renumbered as Loop 15. On October 7, 1939, SH 81 was cancelled and returned to McCulloch County (as per the original minute order designating this road).

== Major intersections ==
County	Location	mi	km	Destinations	Notes
Hill	Hillsboro	0.0	0.0	I-35 / US 77 – Waco	Southern terminus; northbound exit and southbound entrance
Hill	Hillsboro	2.8	4.5	SH 22 east / SH 171 south (Corsicana Hwy.) – Corsicana, Mexia	Southern end of SH 22 / SH 171 concurrency
Hill	Hillsboro	3.3	5.3	SH 22 west / SH 171 north (W. Elm St.) – Meridian, Cleburne	Northern end of SH 22 / SH 171 concurrency
Hill	Hillsboro	5.1	8.2		Spur 579 to I-35
Hill	Lovelace	9.1	14.6	FM 2959 – Carl's Corner	
Hill		11.2	18.0	FM 3147	
Hill	Itasca	13.3	21.4	Spur 176	
Hill	Itasca	14.2	22.9	FM 66 / FM 934 (Main St.) – Maypearl	
Hill		16.9	27.2	FM 2719	
Hill		18.4	29.6	FM 67 – Covington	
Johnson	Grandview	22.2	35.7	FM 4 / FM 916 (Criner St.) – Maypearl, Cleburne	
Johnson		23.4	37.7	I-35W – Ft. Worth	Northern terminus; roadway continues as CR 201A
1.000 mi = 1.609 km; 1.000 km = 0.621 mi

== See also ==
- List of state highways in Texas
