= Alvarado Park Lake =

- Location within Texas Location within the United States
- Location: Johnson County, Texas
- Coordinates: 32°22′N 97°13′W
- Type: reservoir
- Primary inflows: Turkey Creek
- Primary outflows: Turkey Creek
- Basin countries: United States
- Surface area: 437 acres (177 ha)
- Max. depth: 20 ft (6.1 m)
- Water volume: 4,700 acre⋅ft (5,800,000 m^{3})
- Surface elevation: 691.8 ft (210.9 m)
- Website: https://tpwd.texas.gov/fishboat/fish//recreational/lakes/alvarado/

Alvarado Park Lake is a reservoir in Johnson County, Texas 2 miles (3.2 km) southwest of Alvarado, Texas. The county-owned reservoir was built in 1966 by Jack P. McKinney for floodwater retention, municipal water storage, and recreation. It is controlled by the City of Alvarado.

The lake is formed by damming the Turkey Creek, a tributary of Chambers Creek and the Trinity River. It drains 31 square miles (80 km^{2}) and is impounded by a 3,500-foot-long (1,100 m) dam 49 feet (15 m) high with a spillway level of 704.1 feet (214.6 m). The water is stained to murky due to sediment.

The nearest major highways are I-35W and US Hwy 67, each approximately 3 miles (4.8 km) from the lake.

== Fish populations ==
The predominant species of fish include:

- Largemouth bass
- Channel catfish
- White bass
- Crappie

On November 22, 2021, Waco Inland Fisheries District built constructed small freshwater reef using four PVC pipes for the purpose of luring sportfish allowing anglers have a easier catching experience.

== Recreational uses ==
- Boating
- Water skiing
- Fishing
- Swimming
- Picnicking
- Birdwatching

A public boat ramp is located on the north side of the lake as well as a private residential boat ramp on the southeast side. The northside public boat ramp is open all year and fee-free. Contact City of Alvarado for overnight or weekend use.

No overnight camping is permitted.
