= Sand Flat, Johnson County, Texas =

Unincorporated community in Johnson County, Texas, United States

Sand Flat, Texas
- Unincorporated community
- Location within Texas Location within the United States
- Coordinates: 32°19′23″N 97°17′18″W
- Country: United States
- State: Texas
- County: Johnson
- Elevation: 840 ft (256 m)
- Time zone: UTC-6 (Central (CST))
  - Summer (DST): UTC-5 (CDT)
- ZIP Code: 76031
- Area codes: 817, 682
- GNIS feature ID: 1379018

Sand Flat is an unincorporated community in Johnson County, Texas, United States. It is located along Farm to Market Road 4 (FM 4) in the southeastern part of the county, roughly midway between Cleburne and Grandview and just over one mile (1.6 km) north-northeast of the unincorporated community of Cuba.

== History ==
The area was first settled in the 1850s. The Sand Flat Baptist Church of Christ was organized on August 30, 1868. However, several years later, in 1874, it changed its name to its current one, the Sand Flat Baptist Church of Christ. By 1882 the community had a post office under the name "Cuba", but it was closed in 1904. Following the closing of the post office, the area became known by the current name of Sand Flat.

== Transportation ==
FM 4 is the only major highway through the community, which is also served by several county roads.
