= Rio Vista Independent School District =

School district in Texas

Coordinates: 32.2304°N 97.3758°W

Location
- Rio Vista, TX ESC Region 11 USA

District information
- Type: Public
- Grades: Pre-K through 12
- Superintendent: Paul Ryan

Students and staff
- Athletic conference: UIL Class AA
- District mascot: Eagle
- Colors: Green, Black, and White

Other information
- Website: www.rvisd.net

Rio Vista Independent School District is a public school district based in Rio Vista, Texas (USA).

Located in southern Johnson County, a small portion of the district extends into northern Hill County.

In 2009, the school district was rated "academically acceptable" by the Texas Education Agency.

== Schools ==
- Rio Vista High (Grades 9-12)
- Rio Vista Middle (Grades 6-8)
- Rio Vista Elementary (Grades PK-5)
