= Johnson County Courthouse (Texas) =

- U.S. National Register of Historic Places
- Texas State Antiquities Landmark
- Recorded Texas Historic Landmark
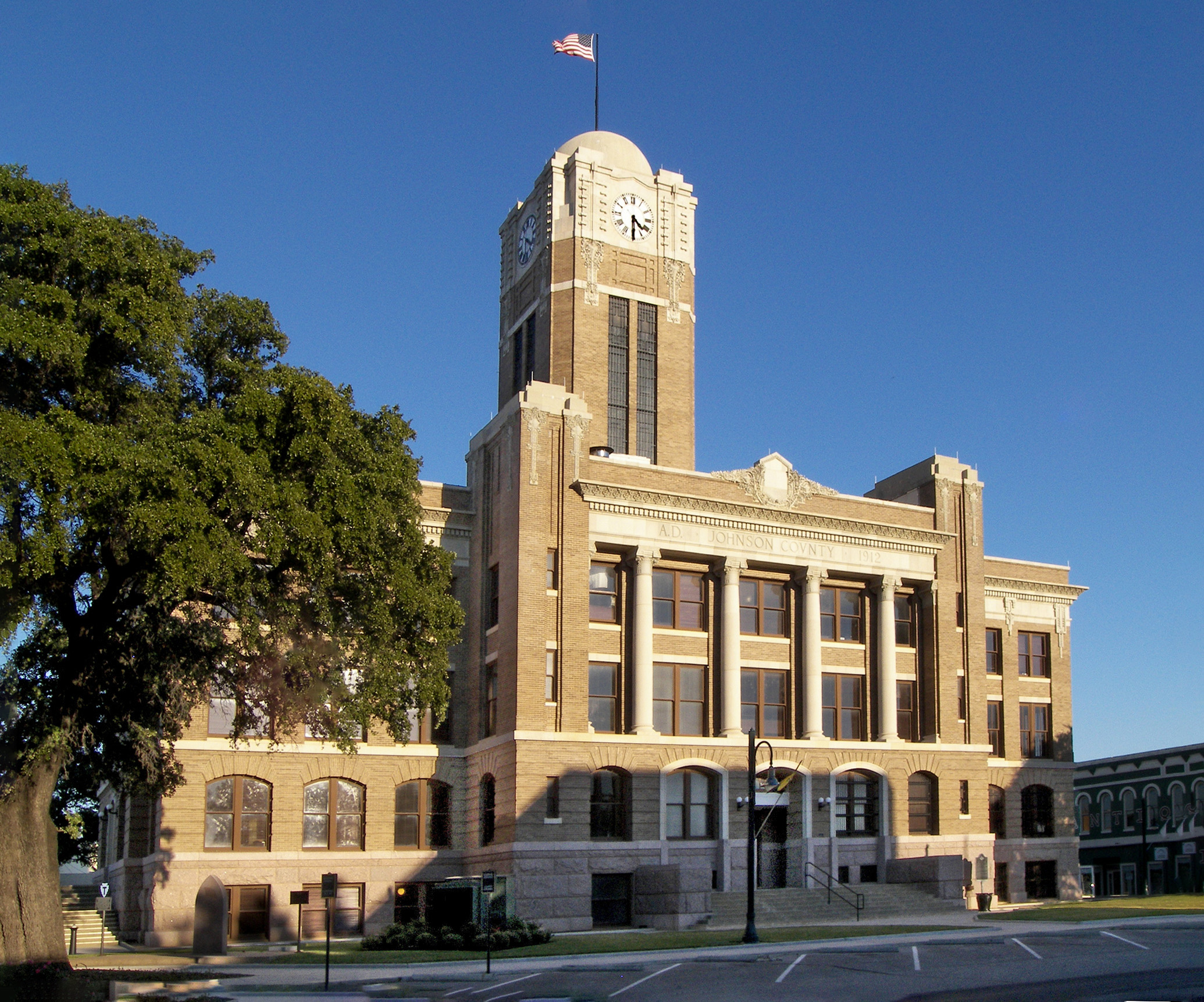
- Johnson County Courthouse in 2009.

- Location within Texas Location within the United States
- Interactive map showing the location of Johnson County Courthouse
- Location: 1 Public Sq, Cleburne, Texas
- Coordinates: 32°20′50″N 97°23′10″W
- Area: less than one acre
- Built: 1913
- Built by: American Construction Co.
- Architect: Lang & Witchell
- Architectural style: Late 19th And Early 20th Century American Movements, Beaux Arts, Sullivanesque
- NRHP reference No.: 88000439
- TSAL No.: 401
- RTHL No.: 2831

Significant dates
- Added to NRHP: April 14, 1988
- Designated TSAL: May 15, 1992
- Designated RTHL: 1999

Johnson County, Texas, has had many courthouses since it was formed.

== Historical courthouses of Johnson County ==
The original courthouse was at Wardville. It is still in existence today at a park on the banks of Lake Pat Cleburne, though it suffered damage at the hands of arsonists in 2007. In 1856, the county seat was moved to Buchanan and a new courthouse was built, which survived until at least the mid-1860s. A two-story framed courthouse was planned but never constructed. When part of Johnson County was consolidated into Hood County the county seat was moved again, to "Camp Henderson" which was renamed Cleburne. The first building used was off the square proper of the town, at 2 North Caddo. A two-story brick courthouse was completed on October 26, 1879. In 1882, this one was razed and a new brick building was built which included a bell tower. Though it was brick, it shared styling with neighboring Hill County's courthouse. This was destroyed by fire on April 15, 1912.

== Current courthouse ==
The current Prairie style structure was completed on November 28, 1913, and was renovated in 2006.

== See also ==
- National Register of Historic Places listings in Johnson County, Texas
- Recorded Texas Historic Landmarks in Johnson County
- List of county courthouses in Texas
