= Texas State Highway 171 =

State highway in Texas

State Highway 171
- SH 171; mainline in red, business route in blue

Route information
- Maintained by TxDOT
- Length: 110.845 mi (178.388 km)
- Existed: 1932–present

Major junctions
- South end: US 84 in Mexia
- I-35 / US 77 in Hillsboro; US 67 in Cleburne; Chisholm Trail Parkway in Cleburne; US 377 in Cresson; I-20 in Weatherford
- North end: US 180 / FM 51 in Weatherford

Location
- Country: United States
- State: Texas
- Counties: Limestone; Hill; Johnson; Hood; Parker

Highway system
- Highways in Texas; Interstate; US; State; Former; Toll; Loops; Spurs; FM/RM; Park; Rec
| ← SH 170 | → SH 172 |

State Highway 171 (SH 171) is a 110.845-mile (178.388 km) southeast–northwest state highway in northeastern Texas, United States, that connects U.S. Highway 84 (US 84) in Mexia with U.S. Highway 180 (US 180) in Weatherford.

== Route description ==
SH 171 begins at an intersection with US 84 in Mexia, before quickly intersecting State Highway 14. Leaving the town, SH 171 runs northwest to Tehuacana, before running in a more west direction to Coolidge. The highway runs in a northwest direction again, running through the towns of Hubbard and Malone before entering Hillsboro. SH 171 runs through the town overlapped with State Highway 22, before running in a mostly north direction towards Cleburne. In Cleburne, SH 171 shares an overlap with State Highway 174 through the city. After crossing U.S. Route 67 and the Chisholm Trail Parkway, the highway turns back in a more northwest direction towards Godley and Cresson. After Cresson, SH 171 briefly has a run in Hood County before entering Parker County. The highway enters into Weatherford, where it ends in downtown at an intersection with US 180.

== History ==
The route was originally designated on August 3, 1932 along the portion between Hillsboro and Coolidge. On July 15, 1935, the section from Coolidge to Hubbard was cancelled (as it was not built yet). On September 22, 1936, this section was restored. On January 18, 1937, the route had been extended to Covington. On March 16, 1937, the section from Hubbard to Munger was cancelled due to a lateral project. This section was restored on October 24, 1938. On October 25, 1938, SH 171 was extended southeast to Mexia along the old route of US 84/SH 7. On September 26, 1939, SH 171 was extended to the northwest significantly, absorbing portions of SH 2A and all of SH 122.

== Major intersections ==
| County | Location | mi | km | Destinations | Notes |
|---|---|---|---|---|---|
| Limestone | Mexia | | | US 84 – Waco, Teague | |
| Limestone | Mexia | | | SH 14 – Groesbeck, Wortham | |
| Limestone | | | | FM 2838 west | |
| Limestone | Tehuacana | | | FM 638 north – Dawson | |
| Limestone | | | | FM 27 east – Wortham | |
| Limestone | Coolidge | | | FM 73 south – Prairie Hill | South end of FM 73 overlap |
| Limestone | Coolidge | | | FM 1951 south | |
| Limestone | | | | FM 73 north | North end of FM 73 overlap |
| Hill | Hubbard | | | SH 31 – Waco, Corsicana | |
| Hill | Hubbard | | | FM 2114 east – Penelope | |
| Hill | Malone | | | FM 744 east – Wesley | |
| Hill | Malone | | | FM 308 – Penelope, Mertens | |
| Hill | Bynum | | | FM 1242 south – Abbott | |
| Hill | Bynum | | | FM 1946 east | |
| Hill | | | | FM 1243 north – Brandon | |
| Hill | | | | SH 22 east – Corsicana | South end of SH 22 overlap |
| Hill | Hillsboro | | | I-35 / US 77 – Dallas, Fort Worth, Waco | |
| Hill | Hillsboro | | | FM 3267 south | |
| Hill | Hillsboro | | | SH 81 south – Waco | South end of SH 81 overlap |
| Hill | Hillsboro | | | SH 81 north – Itasca | North end of SH 81 overlap |
| Hill | Hillsboro | | | SH 22 west – Meridian | North end of SH 22 overlap |
| Hill | | | | FM 66 east – Itasca | |
| Hill | | | | FM 934 east – Itasca | South end of FM 934 overlap |
| Hill | | | | FM 934 west | North end of FM 934 overlap |
| Hill | | | | FM 2719 east | |
| Hill | | | | Bus. SH 171 north – Covington | |
| Hill | Covington | | | FM 67 – Blum, Itasca | |
| Hill | Covington | | | Bus. SH 171 south – Covington | |
| Johnson | Parker | | | FM 916 east – Grandview | South end of FM 916 overlap |
| Johnson | | | | FM 916 west – Rio Vista | North end of FM 916 overlap |
| Johnson | | | | FM 2135 north | |
| Johnson | Cleburne | | | SH 174 south – Meridian | South end of SH 174 overlap |
| Johnson | Cleburne | | | FM 1718 west (Country Club Road) – Lake Pat Cleburne | |
| Johnson | Cleburne | | | FM 4 east (2nd Street) – Grandview | South end of FM 4 overlap |
| Johnson | Cleburne | | | Bus. US 67 (Henderson Street, Chambers Street) | |
| Johnson | Cleburne | | | FM 4 west (Kilpatrick Street) – Granbury | North end of FM 4 overlap |
| Johnson | Cleburne | | | SH 174 north (Main Street) – Burleson | North end of SH 174 overlap |
| Johnson | Cleburne | | | US 67 (Katherine P. Raines Road) – Glen Rose, Dallas | |
| Johnson | Cleburne | | | Chisholm Trail Parkway – Fort Worth | Connection via County Road 1125 |
| Johnson | Godley | | | FM 2331 south | South end of FM 2331 overlap |
| Johnson | Godley | | | FM 917 east – Joshua | |
| Johnson | Godley | | | FM 2331 north | |
| Hood | Cresson | | | US 377 – Granbury, Fort Worth | |
| Hood | | | | FM 3450 west | |
| Parker | | | | FM 51 south – Granbury | South end of FM 51 overlap |
| Parker | Weatherford | | | I-20 – Abilene, Fort Worth | |
| Parker | Weatherford | | | FM 1884 south (Bethel Road) | |
| Parker | Weatherford | | | US 180 / FM 51 north – Mineral Wells, Fort Worth, Springtown | North end of FM 51 overlap; continues past US 180 as FM 51; US 180 is former US 80 |
1.000 mi = 1.609 km; 1.000 km = 0.621 mi: Concurrency terminus

== See also ==
- List of state highways in Texas
- List of highways numbered 171
