= Lillian Independent School District =

School district in Texas

Coordinates: 32.5000°N 97.1870°W

Lillian Independent School District was a school district headquartered in Lillian, Texas.

On July 1, 1986, it merged into the Alvarado Independent School District.

== History ==
A single frame school building was completed in 1903, followed by the first formal school, Lillian Institute, opened on November 7, 1904.
