= Brookshire Brothers =

American supermarket chain

Brookshire Brothers Company

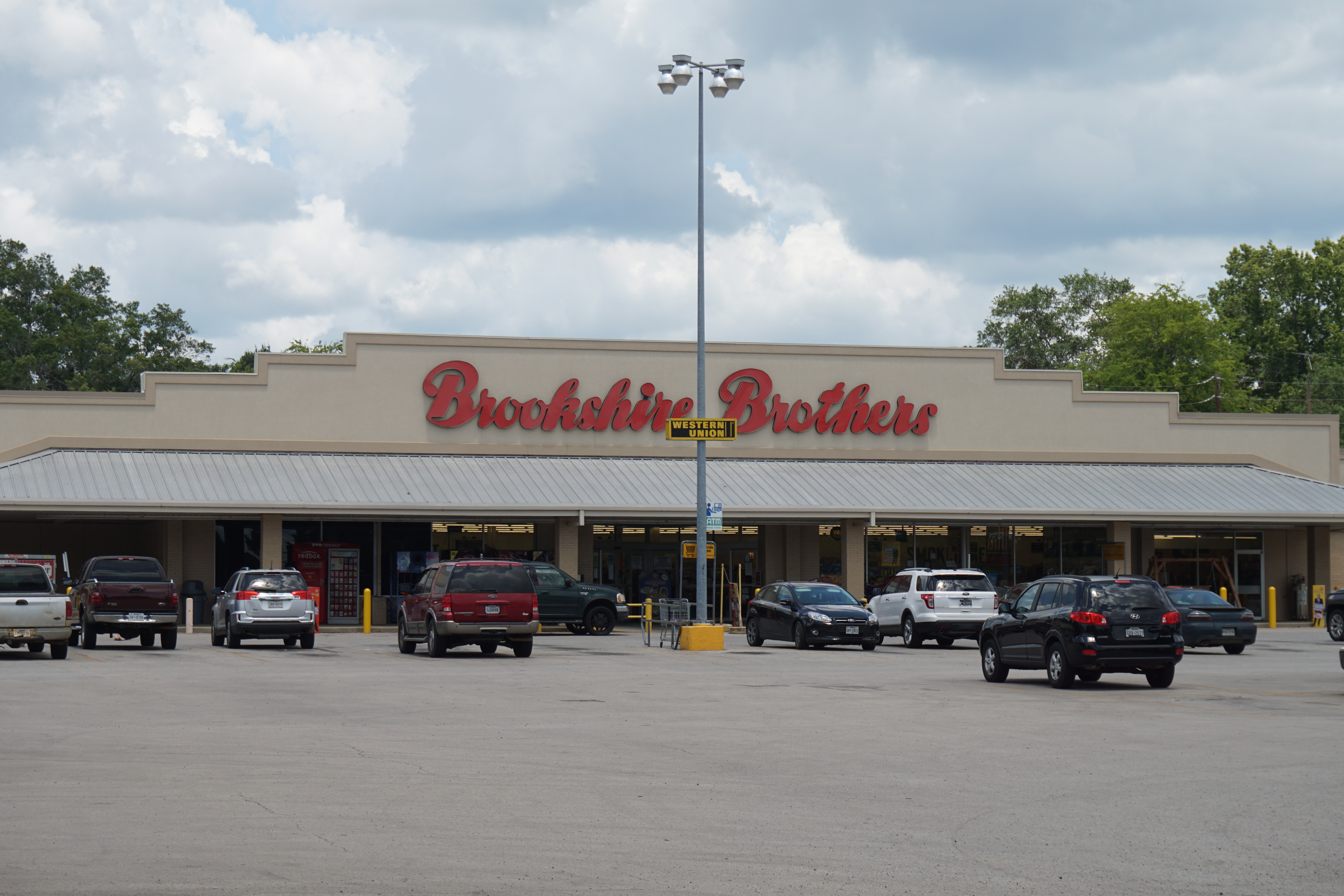
- A Brookshire Brothers store in Carthage, Texas
- Company type: Private, employee-owned
- Industry: Retail
- Founded: September 21, 1921; 104 years ago Lufkin, Texas, U.S.
- Founders: Austin Brookshire; Tom Brookshire
- Headquarters: Lufkin, Texas, U.S.
- Number of locations: 117 (108 Brookshire Brothers, 8 David's stores, 1 Pecan Foods store)
- Area served: Texas; Louisiana
- Key people: John Alston (CEO & President); Clay Oliver (CFO)
- Revenue: ▲$2 billion (2021)
- Owner: Employee Owned and Operated
- Number of employees: 7,000 (2021)
- Website: www.brookshirebrothers.com

Brookshire Brothers, is an employee-owned American supermarket chain headquartered in Lufkin, Texas, founded in 1921 by brothers Austin and Tom Brookshire. Brookshire Brothers is a private corporation that is wholly owned by employees. Brookshire Brothers operates stores in Texas and Louisiana. Locations with the Brookshire Brothers name operate as retail outlets, grocery stores, convenience stores, as well as free-standing pharmacy, tobacco, and gasoline locations.

== History ==
As the business grew and more stores opened, Wood T. Brookshire and cousin W.A. Brookshire withdrew from the company and started Brookshire's, which now operates independently in Tyler, Texas.

The following growth through the 1950s and 60s, Austin Brookshire's three sons, Oscar, Eugene, and R.A., assumed leadership and grew the company to more than 70 stores. In 1999, as the surviving brothers neared retirement, the company embarked on an employee-owner stock buy out. By 2006, Brookshire Brothers achieved 100% employee-ownership.

Brookshire Brothers continue to expand its footprint. It acquired the assets of David's Supermarkets out of Grandview, Texas, in 2014 and built additional stores in Zavalla, Apple Springs, Pilot Point (at the location of a closed ALCO when that firm went out of business), Hamilton, and Canyon Lake, Texas.

In 2018, Brookshire Brothers announced they would provide delivery and curbside pickup from select locations. The services are offered through Rosie, which is a grocery delivery and pickup provider. The service was initially offered at 2 locations in Lufkin, Texas.

Brookshire Brothers Company is now owned entirely by its 5,600 employees; Brookshire's Food and Pharmacy have stayed in the family but are a separate chain.

== Brands ==
- Fresh Harvest
- Food Club
- Crav'n Flavor
- Simply Done
- Paws
- TopCare
- Cape Covelle Seafood
- CharKing
- WideAwake Coffee Co.
- Tippy Toes
- That's Smart
