= Texas State Highway 337 =

State highway in Texas

State Highway 337
- SH 337, highlighted in red

Route information
- Maintained by TxDOT
- Length: 21.100 mi (33.957 km)
- Existed: 1963–present

Major junctions
- South end: US 180 in Mineral Wells
- North end: SH 16

Location
- Country: United States
- State: Texas

Highway system
- Highways in Texas; Interstate; US; State; Former; Toll; Loops; Spurs; FM/RM; Park; Rec
← SH 336	→ SH 338

State Highway 337 (SH 337) is a 21.1-mile (33.957 km) state highway in the U.S. state of Texas. The highway begins at a junction with US 180 in Mineral Wells, then heads northwest, ending at a junction with SH 16 near Possum Kingdom Lake.

== History ==
SH 337 was originally designated on December 3, 1940 as a route from SH 78 north of Bailey to SH 34. That route was transferred to FM 68 on August 1, 1942. It was then not designated, but signed on March 30, 1955 over FM 1077 from Plains to the New Mexico state line to match New Mexico Highway 337. On September 26, 1963, this route was transferred to US 82, along with New Mexico Highway 337.

SH 337 was again designated on August 12, 1963 to serve as a route between SH 16 and Mineral Wells.

== Route description ==
SH 337 begins at a junction with US 180 in Mineral Wells. The highway travels in a northwestern direction, intersecting SH 254 / FM 4 in Graford. North of Graford, the highway turns in a more western direction, ending at SH 16 near the northern shore of Possum Kingdom Lake.

== Junction list ==
The entire route is in Palo Pinto County.

Location	mi	km	Destinations	Notes
Mineral Wells	0.0	0.0	US 180 – Palo Pinto, Mineral Wells	
Graford	11.4	18.3	SH 254 / FM 4 – Possum Kingdom Lake, Graford	
	21.1	34.0	SH 16 – Possum Kingdom Lake, Graham	
1.000 mi = 1.609 km; 1.000 km = 0.621 mi
