= Texas State Highway 254 =

State highway in Texas

State Highway 254
- SH 254, highlighted in red

Route information
- Maintained by TxDOT
- Length: 18.524 mi (29.811 km)
- Existed: 1937–present

Major junctions
- West end: SH 16 west of Graford
- East end: US 281 north of Mineral Wells

Location
- Country: United States
- State: Texas

Highway system
- Highways in Texas; Interstate; US; State; Former; Toll; Loops; Spurs; FM/RM; Park; Rec
← SH 253	→ SH 255

State Highway 254 (SH 254) is a short state highway completely within Palo Pinto County, Texas. The route was originally designated on September 21, 1937 on a route between Graham and Mineral Wells. By 1945, the route had been built, passing through Graford and ending on US 281 north of Mineral Wells. The highway continues as FM 1885 southeast to FM 920 near Weatherford. On January 31, 1969, it was shortened to its current route when SH 16 was extended north through Graham.

== Junction list ==
The entire route is in Palo Pinto County.

Location	mi	km	Destinations	Notes
	0.0	0.0	SH 16	Western terminus
	6.5	10.5	FM 4 south – Palo Pinto	West end of FM 4 overlap
Graford	7.3	11.7	SH 337 – Graham	
Graford	7.9	12.7	FM 4 north (Main Street) – Jacksboro	East end of FM 4 overlap
Graford	8.7	14.0	Spur 397 west	Spur 397 is signed as "Loop 397 Business"
	13.0	20.9	FM 52 north – Oran	
	18.5	29.8	US 281 / FM 1885 east – Jacksboro, Mineral Wells, Weatherford	Eastern terminus
1.000 mi = 1.609 km; 1.000 km = 0.621 mi: Concurrency terminus
