= Lillian, Texas =

- Unincorporated community
- Location within Texas Location within the United States
- Coordinates: 32°30′23″N 97°11′15″W
- Country: United States
- State: Texas
- County: Johnson
- Elevation: 720 ft (220 m)
- Time zone: UTC-6 (Central (CST))
  - Summer (DST): UTC-5 (CDT)
- ZIP Code: 76061
- Area codes: 817, 682
- GNIS feature ID: 1339920

Lillian is an unincorporated community in Johnson County, Texas, United States. It is located along Farm to Market Road 2738, approximately 15 miles (24 km) northeast of Cleburne.

== Education ==
Lillian is part of the Alvarado Independent School District. Lillian Elementary School, which serves students in grades pre-kindergarten through four, is located in the community.

The Lillian Independent School District consolidated into Alvarado ISD on July 1, 1986.

== Climate ==
The climate in this area is characterized by hot, humid summers and generally mild to cool winters. According to the Köppen Climate Classification system, Lillian has a humid subtropical climate, abbreviated "Cfa" on climate maps.
