= Covington Independent School District =

School district in Texas

Coordinates: 32.1829°N 97.2564°W

Location
- Covington, TX ESC Region 12 USA

District information
- Type: Public
- Grades: Pre-K through 12

Students and staff
- Athletic conference: UIL Class A (six man football participant)

Other information
- Mascot: Owl
- Website: Covington ISD

Covington Independent School District is a public school district based in Covington, Texas (USA).

The district has one school that serves students in grades pre-kindergarten through twelve.

In 2010, the school district was rated "recognized" by the Texas Education Agency.

== History ==
The first mention of any school in Covington comes from the early history of the founding of the town of Covington. Covington was founded by Colonel James. J. Gathings in the spring of 1852. He became the owner of 10,000 acres (40 km^{2}) of land on the east side of the Cross Timbers. He subdivided 100 acres (0.40 km^{2}) of land at the present site of Covington into lots from 1 to 10 acres (40,000 m^{2}). He then offered these lost free "to anyone who would build, make it his home and lend his influence in building up the school."

In the early 1860s, probably 1862, Gathings College was founded by James Gathings and his brother Philip. Almost immediately it became the largest, and by some accounts, the best school in Texas. It had an enrollment of over two hundred boys and girls from all over Texas. In connection with the college, a military school was established to prepare the young men for military duty.

Gathings College had a sharp decline in enrollment after the Civil War because of the general turmoil resulting throughout the entire South during the reconstruction era. However, some type of school apparently continued at the site as part of the original college was incorporated into the Covington Public School at some point. The two-story red brick school that so many ex students are familiar with still had the original college coal bin and part of the auditorium in it when it cease to be used in 1966.

The town of Covington held an election of the 18th day of April, 1906, to determine if the town should incorporate for "free school purposes". Sixty-five votes were cast for incorporation and 15 votes were cast for no corporation. Hill County Judge N.J. Smith then declared Covington to be "duly incorporate for free school purposes", the name of the incorporation being "Covington Independent School District". At the same election, seven trustees for the new school district were elected from a field of 20 candidates.

An article in the Covington Chronicle from November 12, 1931, lists nine teachers, a principal and a superintendent for Covington Schools. The same article states that "the present town has a good brick school building, two churches, a bank, and a number of neat business houses, and is doing a large volume of business."

In the early 1960s the town and school had declined to the point that a motion was made on May 29, 1961, to consolidate with Itasca ISD. Board Secretary E.D. Kiblinger suggested tabling the motion and holding a town meeting first to determine what the citizens wanted. Again in 1963 or 64, the board voted to close and consolidate with Itasca. The vote was a tie with three trustees voting for consolidation and three voting to try to keep the school the board president, Johnny Milburn, broke the tie and voted to keep the school. The total school enrollment at that time was 87 students in grades 1 through 12. Our highest enrollment was in the year 2000 with 368 students in grades pre-K through 12. Current enrollment is 332.

== Special programs ==
=== Athletics ===
Covington High School plays six-man football.

== See also ==
- List of school districts in Texas
