= Bono, Texas =

- Unincorporated community
- Location within Texas Location within the United States
- Coordinates: 32°19′25.5″N 97°30′14.8″W
- Country: United States
- State: Texas
- County: Johnson
- Elevation: 830 ft (253 m)
- Time zone: UTC-6 (Central (CST))
  - Summer (DST): UTC-5 (CDT)
- ZIP Code: 76044
- Area codes: 817, 682
- GNIS feature ID: 1378030

Bono is an unincorporated community in Johnson County, Texas, United States. Located on Farm to Market Road 2331 in the southwestern portion of the county, Bono is one mile west of U.S. Highway 67.

== History ==
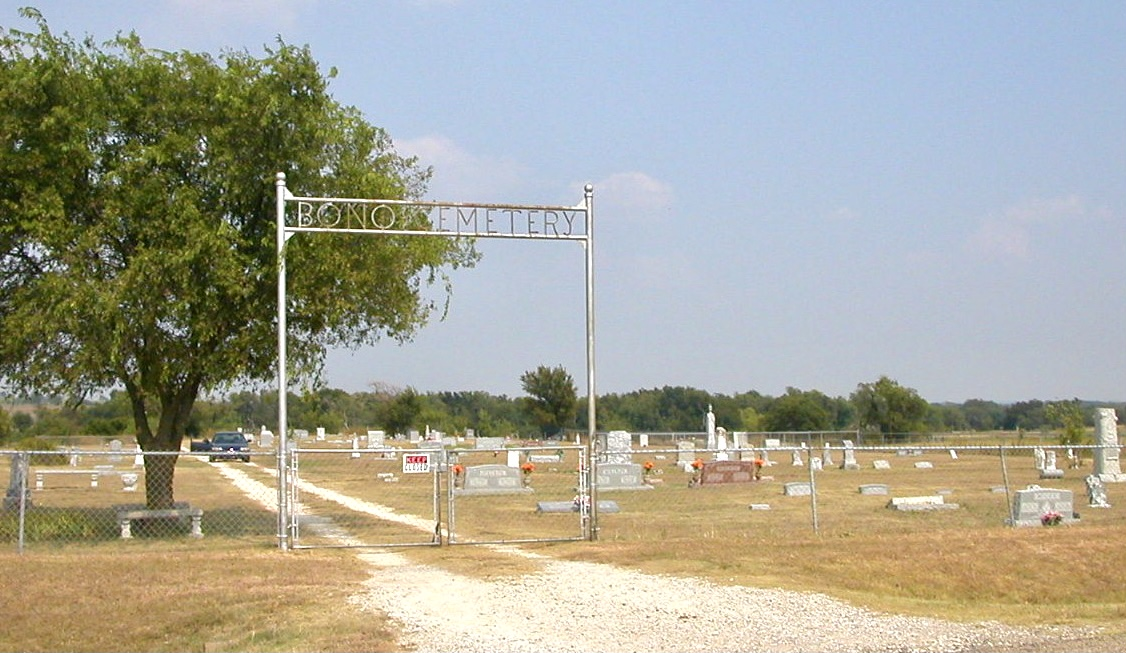
Bono Cemetery, Johnson County, Texas

The area was first settled in the early 1870s by two families (one of Calvin L. Jones and one of B.H. Williamson), who each donated 20 acres for a townsite. Sixteen acres were set aside for a church and school site, and the rest was free for individuals to build homes. Families were attracted to the area because of the church and school and the community, named Bono by Jones, established a post office in 1879. A tornado struck the town on May 4, 1890, destroying homes and killing several people. The population reached 75 by 1900 and continued to thrive until the Great Depression, unusual compared to other settlements that were bypassed by the railroad in the area. The settlement had a cotton gin, two stores, two churches, and a school. The 1940s saw a decline in population, as the number of area farmers decreased as the region moved on from cotton production and switched to dairy production. The post office closed during this time, although a community building and Baptist church remained in the area in 1971 and a state map noted the presence of a small cemetery in 1984.
