= Alvarado Independent School District =

School district in Texas

- Alvarado ISD's location in the DFW Metroplex.

Location
- 110 N Bill Jackson Dr. Alvarado, Texas ESC Region 11 USA
- Coordinates: 32°24′25″N 97°13′15″W

District information
- Type: Independent school district
- Grades: Pre-K through 12
- Superintendent: Kenneth Estes
- Schools: 8 (2009-10)
- NCES District ID: 4800011

Students and staff
- Students: 3,516 (2010-11)
- Teachers: 205.49 (2009-10) (on full-time equivalent (FTE) basis)
- Student–teacher ratio: 16.56 (2009-10)
- Athletic conference: UIL Class 4A Football & Basketball
- District mascot: Indians
- Colors: Purple, Gold, White

Other information
- TEA District Accountability Rating for 2011-12: Academically Acceptable
- Website: Alvarado ISD

The Alvarado Independent School District is a public school district based in Alvarado, Texas, United States. In addition to Alvarado, the district also serves the unincorporated community of Lillian. The district operates one high school, Alvarado High School.

== History ==
The Lillian Independent School District consolidated into Alvarado ISD on July 1, 1986.

== Finances ==
As of the 2010–11 school year, the appraised valuation of property in the district was $1,536,036,000. The maintenance tax rate was $0.104 and the bond tax rate was $0.028 per $100 of appraised valuation.

== Academic achievement ==
In 2011, the school district was rated "academically acceptable" by the Texas Education Agency. Forty-nine percent of districts in Texas in 2011 received the same rating. No state accountability ratings will be given to districts in 2012. A school district in Texas can receive one of four possible rankings from the Texas Education Agency: Exemplary (the highest possible ranking), Recognized, Academically Acceptable, and Academically Unacceptable (the lowest possible ranking).

Historical district TEA accountability ratings

- 2011: Academically Acceptable
- 2010: Academically Acceptable
- 2009: Academically Acceptable
- 2008: Academically Acceptable
- 2007: Academically Acceptable
- 2006: Academically Acceptable
- 2005: Academically Acceptable
- 2004: Academically Acceptable

== Schools ==
In the 2011-2012 school year, the district had students in nine schools.

Regular instructional

- Alvarado High School (Grades 9-12)
- Alvarado Junior High School (Grades 6-8)
- Alvarado Elementary North (Grades PK-5)
- Alvarado Elementary South (Grades PK-5)
- Lillian Elementary School (Grades PK-5)

Alternative instructional

- Alvarado ISD Accelerated Education (Grades 9-12)

JJAEP instructional

- Juvenile Justice Alternative (Grades 6-12)

DAEP instructional

- Alternative Learning Center (Grades 6-12)

== Special programs ==
=== Athletics ===
Alvarado High School participates in the boys sports of baseball, basketball, football, soccer, track, cross country, and wrestling. The school participates in the girls sports of basketball, soccer, softball, track, cross country, and volleyball. For the 2016 through 2017 school years, Alvarado High School will play football in UIL Class 4A.

== See also ==
- List of school districts in Texas
- List of high schools in Texas
