= Grandview Independent School District =

School district in Texas

Grandview ISD

Location
- 701 S Fifth St. Grandview, TX USA

District information
- Type: Public
- Motto: It's a great day to be a ZEBRA!
- Grades: Pre-K through 12
- Superintendent: Kirby Basham
- Asst. superintendent(s): Kristi Rhone

Students and staff
- Athletic conference: UIL Class 3A
- District mascot: Zebra
- Colors: Black and white

Other information
- Website: Grandview ISD

Grandview Independent School District is a public school district based in Grandview, Texas (USA).

Located in southern Johnson County, a small portion of the district extends into northern Hill County.

In 2009, the school district was rated "recognized" by the Texas Education Agency. The elementary was named a National Blue Ribbon School in 2015.

== Schools ==
- Grandview High School (Grades 9-12)
- Grandview Junior High School (Grades 6-8)
- Grandview Elementary School (Grades PK-5)
