= Johnson County, Texas =

County in Texas, United States

- County
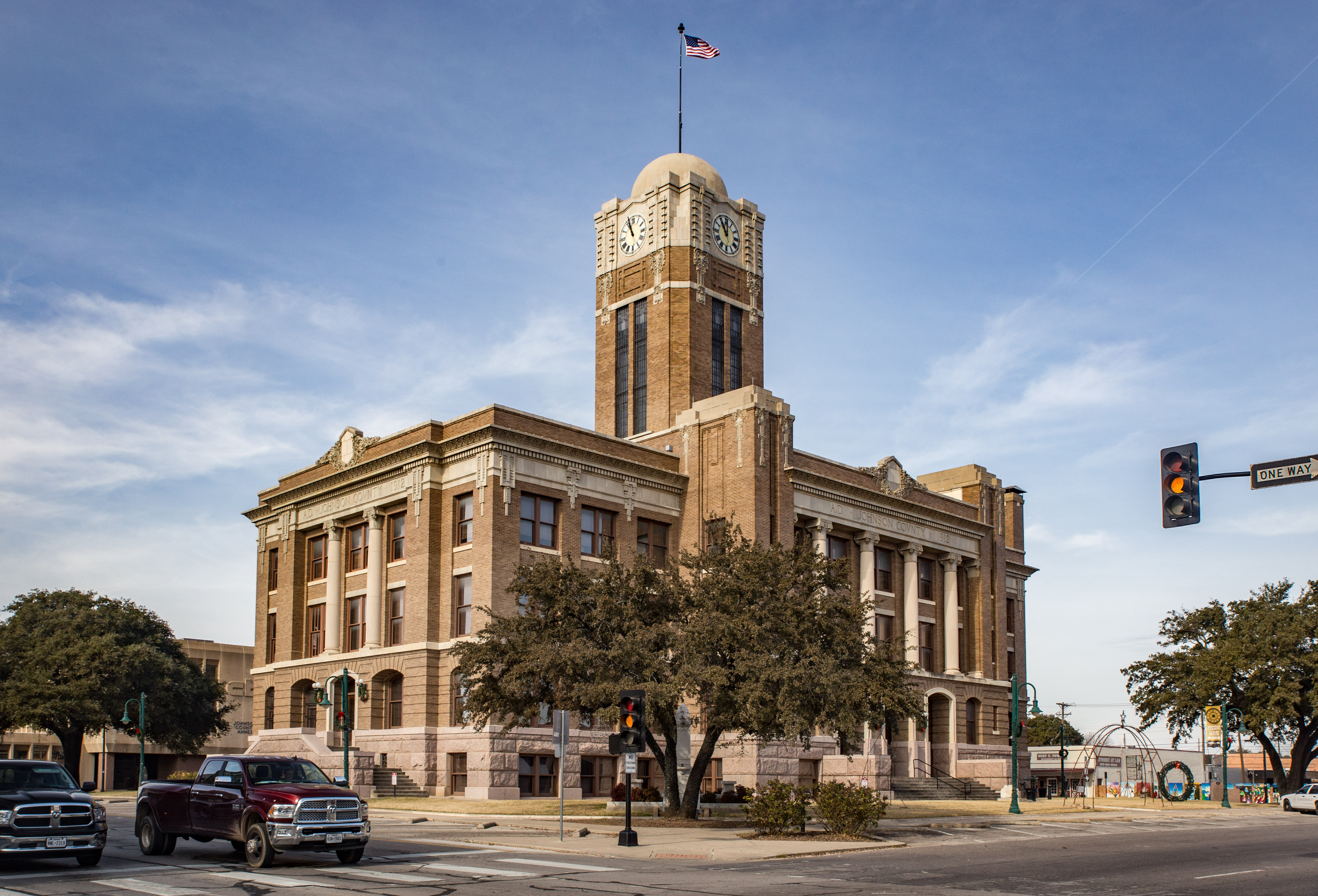
- The Johnson County Courthouse

- Location within the U.S. state of Texas
- Coordinates: 32°23′N 97°22′W
- Country: United States
- State: Texas
- Founded: 1854
- Seat: Cleburne
- Largest city: Burleson

Area
  - Total: 734 sq mi (1,900 km^{2})
  - Land: 725 sq mi (1,880 km^{2})
  - Water: 9.8 sq mi (25 km^{2}) 1.3%

Population (2020)
  - Total: 179,927
  - Estimate (2025): 218,048 ▲
  - Density: 248/sq mi (95.8/km^{2})
- Time zone: UTC−6 (Central)
  - Summer (DST): UTC−5 (CDT)
- Congressional districts: 6th, 25th
- Website: www.johnsoncountytx.org

Johnson County is a county located in the U.S. state of Texas. As of the 2020 census, its population was 179,927. Its county seat is Cleburne. Johnson County is named for Colonel Middleton Tate Johnson Sr., a Texas Ranger, politician and soldier in the Mexican-American War and the American Civil War (fighting for the Confederate States Army). Johnson County is included in the Dallas–Fort Worth–Arlington metropolitan statistical area.

== History ==
The first settler of Johnson County was Henry Briden, who built a log cabin on the Nolan River in 1849. His log cabin still exists, and can be seen along State Highway 174 in Rio Vista, Texas. The first county seat was Wardville, now located under the waters of Lake Pat Cleburne. In 1856, Buchanan became the county seat. Johnson County was divided in 1866, with the western half becoming Hood County. Camp Henderson became the new county seat and was renamed Cleburne in honor of Confederate General Patrick Cleburne.

== Geography ==
According to the U.S. Census Bureau, the county has a total area of 734 square miles (1,900 km^{2}), of which 725 square miles (1,880 km^{2}) are land and 9.8 square miles (25 km^{2}) (1.3%) are covered by water.

=== Major highways ===
- I-35W
- I-35 BL
- U.S. Highway 67
- U.S. Highway 287
- U.S. Highway 377
- State Highway 81
- State Highway 171
- State Highway 174
- Spur 102

=== Adjacent counties ===
- Tarrant County (north)
- Ellis County (east)
- Hill County (south)
- Bosque County (southwest)
- Somervell County (southwest)
- Hood County (west)
- Parker County (northwest)

== Communities ==
=== Cities (multiple counties) ===
- Burleson (small part in Tarrant County)
- Cresson (partly in Hood and Parker counties)
- Crowley (mostly in Tarrant County)
- Fort Worth (mostly in Tarrant County, with small parts in Denton, Parker, and Wise counties)
- Grand Prairie (mostly in Dallas County with small parts in Ellis and Tarrant counties)
- Mansfield (mostly in Tarrant County and a small part in Ellis County)
- Venus (small part in Ellis County)

=== Cities ===
- Alvarado
- Briaroaks
- Burleson
- Cleburne (county seat)
- Coyote Flats
- Godley
- Grandview
- Joshua
- Keene
- Rio Vista

=== Towns ===
- Cross Timber

=== Census-designated place ===
- The Homesteads

=== Unincorporated communities ===
- Beulah
- Bono
- Egan
- Lillian
- Parker
- Sand Flat

== Demographics ==
Historical population
Census	Pop.	Note	%±
1860	4,305		—
1870	4,923		14.4%
1880	17,911		263.8%
1890	22,313		24.6%
1900	33,819		51.6%
1910	34,460		1.9%
1920	37,286		8.2%
1930	33,317		−10.6%
1940	30,384		−8.8%
1950	31,390		3.3%
1960	34,720		10.6%
1970	45,769		31.8%
1980	67,649		47.8%
1990	97,165		43.6%
2000	126,811		30.5%
2010	150,934		19.0%
2020	179,927		19.2%
2025 (est.)	218,048	▲	21.2%
U.S. Decennial Census; 1850–2010 2020

=== Racial and ethnic composition ===
Johnson County, Texas – Racial and ethnic composition Note: the US Census treats Hispanic/Latino as an ethnic category. This table excludes Latinos from the racial categories and assigns them to a separate category. Hispanics/Latinos may be of any race.
Race / Ethnicity (NH = Non-Hispanic)	Pop 1980	Pop 1990	Pop 2000	Pop 2010	Pop 2020	% 1980	% 1990	% 2000	% 2010	% 2020
White alone (NH)	62,640	86,434	105,460	115,545	119,226	92.60%	88.96%	83.16%	76.55%	66.26%
Black or African American alone (NH)	1,910	2,449	3,058	3,797	6,446	2.82%	2.52%	2.41%	2.52%	3.58%
Native American or Alaska Native alone (NH)	129	379	694	741	840	0.19%	0.39%	0.55%	0.49%	0.47%
Asian alone (NH)	133	397	654	951	1,726	0.20%	0.41%	0.52%	0.63%	0.96%
Native Hawaiian or Pacific Islander alone (NH)	x	x	219	475	929	x	x	0.17%	0.31%	0.52%
Other race alone (NH)	66	49	79	164	612	0.10%	0.05%	0.06%	0.11%	0.34%
Mixed race or Multiracial (NH)	x	x	1,272	1,942	7,535	x	x	1.00%	1.29%	4.19%
Hispanic or Latino (any race)	2,771	7,457	15,375	27,319	42,613	4.10%	7.67%	12.12%	18.10%	23.68%
Total	67,649	97,165	126,811	150,934	179,927	100.00%	100.00%	100.00%	100.00%	100.00%

=== 2020 census ===
As of the 2020 census, the county had a population of 179,927, reflecting the increase of the Metroplex's population and suburbanization. The median age was 37.4 years, with 25.5% of residents under the age of 18 and 14.9% of residents 65 years of age or older. For every 100 females there were 99.6 males, and for every 100 females age 18 and over there were 97.5 males age 18 and over.

The racial makeup of the county was 72.2% White, 3.8% Black or African American, 1.0% American Indian and Alaska Native, 1.0% Asian, 0.5% Native Hawaiian and Pacific Islander, 9.2% from some other race, and 12.3% from two or more races. Hispanic or Latino residents of any race comprised 23.7% of the population.

53.5% of residents lived in urban areas, while 46.5% lived in rural areas.

There were 61,654 households in the county, of which 37.9% had children under the age of 18 living in them. Of all households, 57.3% were married-couple households, 14.7% were households with a male householder and no spouse or partner present, and 22.1% were households with a female householder and no spouse or partner present. About 19.9% of all households were made up of individuals and 9.3% had someone living alone who was 65 years of age or older.

There were 65,625 housing units, of which 6.1% were vacant. Among occupied housing units, 74.2% were owner-occupied and 25.8% were renter-occupied. The homeowner vacancy rate was 1.6% and the rental vacancy rate was 6.8%.

=== 2023 American Community Survey 1-Year Estimates ===
Racial Makeup of Johnson County, Texas (2023): 1. White alone (68.7%); 2. Black alone (5.88%); 3. Native American alone (0.76%); 4. Asian alone (1.29%); 5. Pacific Islander alone (0.14%); 6. Some other race (5.14%); 7. Two or more races (18.1%)	Racial Makeup of Johnson County, Texas treating Hispanics as a Racial Category (2023); NH=Non-Hispanic: 1. White NH (63.6%); 2. Black NH (5.88%); 3. Native American NH (0.19%); 4. Asian NH (1.29%); 5. Pacific Islander NH (0.14%); 6. Other race NH (0.37%); 7. Two or more races NH (2.64%); 8. Hispanic Any Race (25.9%)	Racial Makeup of Hispanics in Johnson County, Texas (2023): 1. White alone (19.7%); 2. Black alone (0.00%); 3. Native American alone (2.20%); 4. Asian alone (0.00%); 5. Pacific Islander alone (0.00%); 6. Other race alone (18.4%); 7. Two or more races (59.7%)

Total	Population	Percentage
Hispanic or Latino	52,531	25.9%
NH White	130,578	64.4%
NH Black	11,684	5.8%
NH Asian	2,570	1.3%
NH Native American	922	0.5%
NH Pacific Islander	846	0.4%
NH Multiracial	3,775	1.9%

The United States Census Bureau estimated that in 2023, Johnson County’s population was 202,906. It was also estimated that the county was 25.9% Hispanic or Latino, 64.4% NH White, 5.8% NH Black, 1.3% NH Asian, 0.5% NH Native, 0.4% NH Pacific Islander, and 1.9% NH Multiracial.

=== 2010 census ===
In 2010, its racial makeup was 76.55% non-Hispanic white, 2.52% African American, 0.47% Native American, 0.63% Asian American, 0.31% Pacific Islander, 0.11% some other race, 1.29% multiracial, and 18.10% Hispanic or Latino of any race.

=== 2000 census ===
In 2000 there were 126,811 people, 43,636 households, and 34,428 families residing in the county. The population density was 174 people per square mile (67 people/km^{2}). The 46,269 housing units averaged 63 units per square mile (24/km^{2}).

At the 2000 census, the racial makeup of the county was 90.01% White, 2.50% African American, 0.64% Native American, 0.52% Asian, 0.18% Pacific Islander, 4.52% from other races, and 1.63% from two or more races. About 12.12% of the population was Hispanic or Latino of any race.

As of 2000, the median income for a household in the county was $44,621, and for a family was $49,963. Males had a median income of $36,718 versus $25,149 for females. The per capita income for the county was $18,400. About 6.90% of families and 8.80% of the population were below the poverty line, including 10.60% of those under age 18 and 10.90% of those age 65 or over.

== Education ==
School districts include:

- Alvarado Independent School District
- Burleson Independent School District
- Cleburne Independent School District
- Crowley Independent School District
- Godley Independent School District
- Granbury Independent School District
- Grandview Independent School District
- Joshua Independent School District
- Keene Independent School District
- Mansfield Independent School District
- Rio Vista Independent School District
- Venus Independent School District

Hill College a college in Hillsboro, a town in neighboring Hill County also provides tertiary education, with a campus in Cleburne since 1971. Johnson County is defined by the Texas Education Code as being in the Hill College service area.

Southwestern Adventist University, a private liberal arts university in Keene, is currently the only four-year institution of higher learning in Johnson County. Southwestern is affiliated with the Seventh-day Adventist Church and has existed since 1893.

== Media ==
Johnson County is part of the Dallas/Fort Worth television media market in north-central Texas. Local news media outlets are: KDFW-TV, KXAS-TV, WFAA-TV, KTVT-TV, KERA-TV, KTXA-TV, KDFI-TV, KDAF-TV, KFWD-TV, and KDTX-TV. KCLE is the local radio station, which offers local news in addition to its country-music format. The local newspapers are the Cleburne Times-Review, Burleson Star, and Joshua Star.

== Government and politics ==
Government

Johnson County, like all counties in Texas, is governed by a commissioners' court. This court consists of the county judge (the chairperson of the court), who is elected county-wide, and four commissioners who are elected by the voters in each of four precincts.

The Commissioners' Court is the policy-making body for the county; in addition, the county judge is the senior executive and administrative position in the county. The Commissioners' Court sets the county tax rate, adopts the budget, appoints boards and commissions, approves grants and personnel actions, and oversees the administration of county government. Each commissioner supervises a Road and Bridge District. The Commissioners' Court approves the budget and sets the tax rate for the hospital district, which is charged with the responsibility for providing acute medical care for citizens who otherwise would not receive adequate medical services.

Johnson County is represented in the United States Congress as part of two congressional districts: Texas's 6th congressional district, represented by Republican Jake Ellzey of Midlothian, and Texas's 25th congressional district, represented by Republican Roger Williams of Weatherford. Its two senators are Ted Cruz and John Cornyn, both Republicans. At the state level, Johnson County is represented in the Texas State Legislature as part of Texas's 58th House of Representatives district, represented by Republican Helen Kerwin of Cleburne, and Texas Senate, District 10, represented by Republican Phil King of Weatherford.

County Commissioners

Office	Name	Party
County Judge	Christopher Boedeker	Republican
Commissioner, Precinct 1	Rick Bailey	Republican
Commissioner, Precinct 2	Kenny Howell	Republican
Commissioner, Precinct 3	Mike White	Republican
Commissioner, Precinct 4	Larry Wooley	Republican

Justices of the Peace

Office	Name	Party
Justice of the Peace, Precinct 1	Ronny McBroom	Republican
Justice of the Peace, Precinct 2	Jeff Monk	Republican
Justice of the Peace, Precinct 3	Andrew Nolan	Republican
Justice of the Peace, Precinct 4	Robert Shaw	Republican

Constables

Office	Name	Party
Constable, Precinct 1	Matt Wylie	Republican
Constable, Precinct 2	Adam Crawford	Republican
Constable, Precinct 3	Steve Williams	Republican
Constable, Precinct 4	Troy Fuller	Republican

County Officials

Office	Name	Party
County Attorney	Bill Moore	Republican
District Attorney	Timothy Good	Republican
District Clerk	Dean Sullivan	Republican
County Clerk	April Long	Republican
Sheriff	Adam King	Republican
Tax Assessor-Collector	Scott Porter	Republican
Treasurer	Kathy Blackwell	Republican

=== Courts ===
County Criminal Court

Office	Name	Party
Court at Law 1	John Neill	Republican
Court at Law 2	Steven McClure	Republican

District Courts

Office	Name	Party
18th District Court	Sydney Hewlett	Republican
249th District Court	Tiffany Strother	Republican
413th District Court	William Bosworth	Republican

United States presidential election results for Johnson County, Texas
Year	Republican		Democratic		Third party(ies)	
Year	No.	%	No.	%	No.	%
1912	109	3.56%	2,473	80.84%	477	15.59%
1916	275	7.86%	3,040	86.93%	182	5.20%
1920	661	15.65%	3,041	71.99%	522	12.36%
1924	851	14.77%	4,600	79.85%	310	5.38%
1928	3,181	61.58%	1,981	38.35%	4	0.08%
1932	530	9.81%	4,858	89.88%	17	0.31%
1936	337	7.25%	4,281	92.12%	29	0.62%
1940	649	10.50%	5,532	89.47%	2	0.03%
1944	546	9.26%	4,757	80.68%	593	10.06%
1948	707	13.59%	4,042	77.70%	453	8.71%
1952	3,985	46.97%	4,496	52.99%	4	0.05%
1956	3,750	51.09%	3,560	48.50%	30	0.41%
1960	4,510	53.49%	3,844	45.59%	77	0.91%
1964	3,251	33.72%	6,381	66.18%	10	0.10%
1968	4,372	35.23%	5,330	42.95%	2,709	21.83%
1972	10,042	71.04%	3,968	28.07%	126	0.89%
1976	7,194	39.69%	10,864	59.93%	69	0.38%
1980	11,411	50.82%	10,542	46.95%	501	2.23%
1984	18,254	66.44%	9,148	33.30%	72	0.26%
1988	17,509	58.03%	12,507	41.45%	155	0.51%
1992	13,473	36.22%	12,030	32.34%	11,699	31.45%
1996	16,246	50.03%	12,817	39.47%	3,410	10.50%
2000	26,202	67.66%	11,778	30.41%	746	1.93%
2004	34,818	73.42%	12,325	25.99%	279	0.59%
2008	36,685	73.30%	12,912	25.80%	453	0.91%
2012	37,661	77.11%	10,496	21.49%	681	1.39%
2016	44,382	77.04%	10,988	19.07%	2,236	3.88%
2020	54,628	75.85%	16,464	22.86%	928	1.29%
2024	60,752	75.26%	19,247	23.84%	722	0.89%

Like much of the South, Johnson County was once a Democratic Party stronghold, consistently giving Democrats 70-80% of the vote aside from national Republican landslides. During its early history, Johnson County was crucial in the establishment of the Greenback Party, with many of the movement's major figures hailing from the area (although the county itself never offered significant support to the party). Since 1976, Johnson County has joined much of the South in becoming a stronghold of the Republican Party. The county has given over 70% of its votes to the party in each presidential election since 2004, even as the Dallas-Fort Worth metro area, of which it is a part, has shifted to the left.

United States Senate election results for Johnson County, Texas1
Year	Republican		Democratic		Third party(ies)	
Year	No.	%	No.	%	No.	%
2024	57,382	71.44%	20,935	26.06%	2,006	2.50%

United States Senate election results for Johnson County, Texas2
Year	Republican		Democratic		Third party(ies)	
Year	No.	%	No.	%	No.	%
2020	54,403	76.13%	15,474	21.65%	1,586	2.22%
2026	43,645	62.40%	24,653	35.25%	1,648	2.36%

Texas Gubernatorial election results for Johnson County
Year	Republican		Democratic		Third party(ies)	
Year	No.	%	No.	%	No.	%
2022	42,954	76.89%	12,266	21.96%	644	1.15%
2026	45,154	64.41%	23,673	33.77%	1,281	1.83%

== See also ==
- Johnson County Courthouse
- List of museums in North Texas
- National Register of Historic Places listings in Johnson County, Texas
- Recorded Texas Historic Landmarks in Johnson County
