= Covington, Texas =

- City
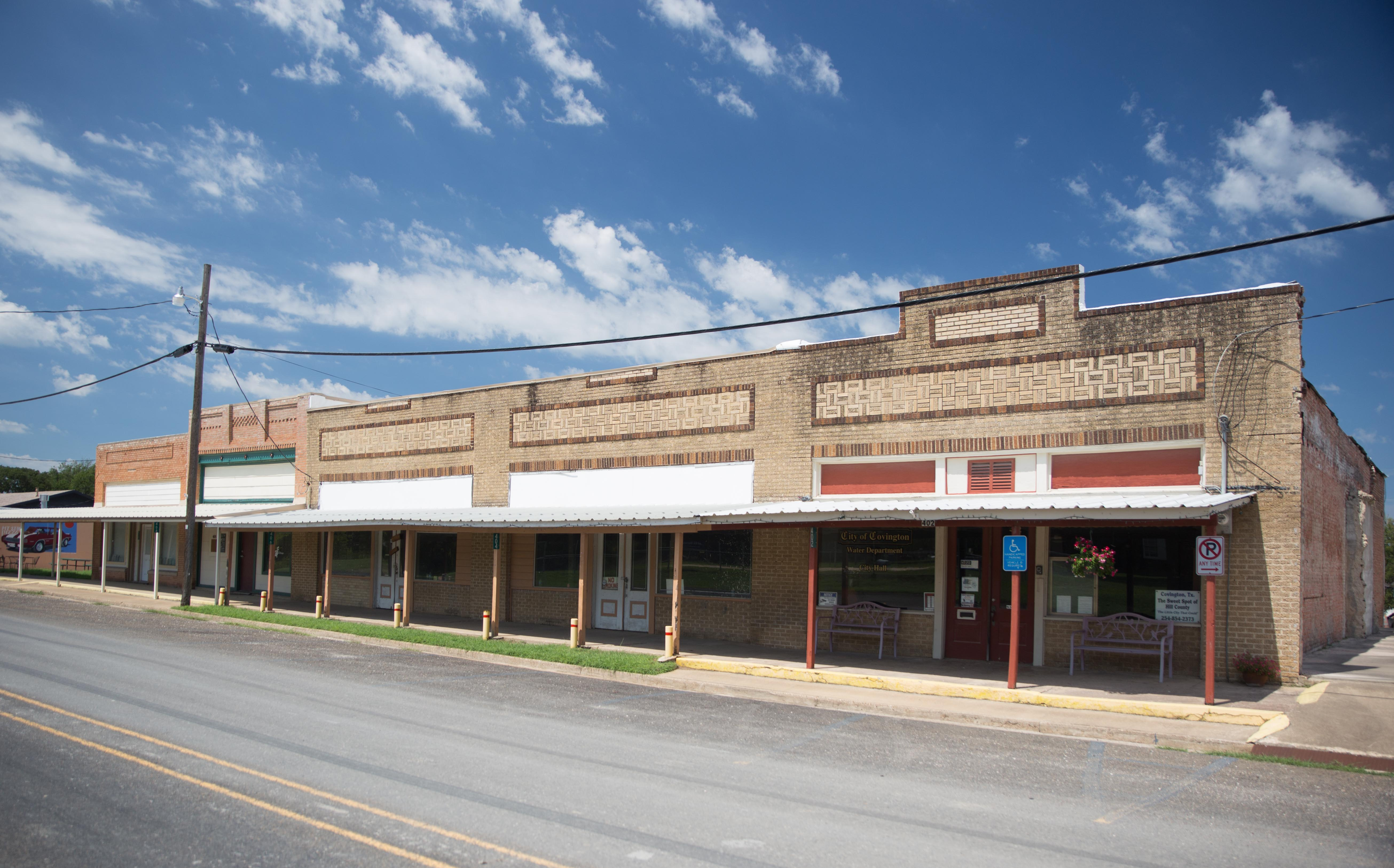
- Downtown Covington

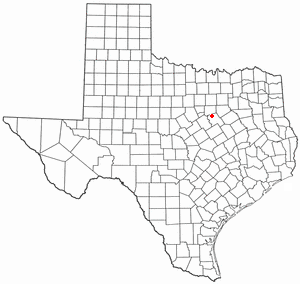
- Location of Covington, Texas

- Coordinates: 32°10′27″N 97°15′20″W
- Country: United States
- State: Texas
- County: Hill

Area
  - Total: 0.83 sq mi (2.14 km^{2})
  - Land: 0.82 sq mi (2.13 km^{2})
  - Water: 0.0077 sq mi (0.02 km^{2})
- Elevation: 732 ft (223 m)

Population (2020)
  - Total: 261
  - Density: 317/sq mi (123/km^{2})
- Time zone: UTC-6 (Central (CST))
  - Summer (DST): UTC-5 (CDT)
- ZIP code: 76636
- Area code: 254
- FIPS code: 48-17372
- GNIS feature ID: 2410252
- Website: covingtontx.net

Covington is a city in Hill County in central Texas, United States. Located at the intersection of FM 67 and State Highway 171, 14 miles (23 km) north of Hillsboro, it is near the northern boundary of Hill County. It was founded by Colonel James Jackson Gathings, formerly of North Carolina and Mississippi, in the spring of 1852, and is named for his wife's family. Gathings secured about 10,000 acres (40 km^{2}) of land in what is now Hill County, 100 of which were set aside for the new town of Covington. The population of Covington, 168 years later, was 261 at the 2020 census.

== Geography ==
Covington is located in northern Hill County. State Highway 171 leads southeast 14 miles (23 km) to Hillsboro, the county seat, and northwest 15 miles (24 km) to Cleburne, while Farm to Market Road 67 leads northeast 10 miles (16 km) to Interstate 35 and southwest the same distance to Blum.

According to the United States Census Bureau, Covington has a total area of 0.8 square miles (2.1 km^{2}), of which 0.01 square miles (0.02 km^{2}), or 0.78%, are water.

== Demographics ==
Historical population
Census	Pop.	Note	%±
1980	259		—
1990	238		−8.1%
2000	282		18.5%
2010	269		−4.6%
2020	261		−3.0%
U.S. Decennial Census; 2020 Census

=== 2020 census ===
As of the 2020 census, Covington had a population of 261. The median age was 39.5 years. 23.4% of residents were under the age of 18 and 16.1% of residents were 65 years of age or older. For every 100 females there were 96.2 males, and for every 100 females age 18 and over there were 94.2 males age 18 and over.

There were 106 households in Covington, of which 34.9% had children under the age of 18 living in them. Of all households, 48.1% were married-couple households, 15.1% were households with a male householder and no spouse or partner present, and 26.4% were households with a female householder and no spouse or partner present. About 28.3% of all households were made up of individuals and 11.3% had someone living alone who was 65 years of age or older.

There were 127 housing units, of which 16.5% were vacant. The homeowner vacancy rate was 0.0% and the rental vacancy rate was 11.5%.

0.0% of residents lived in urban areas, while 100.0% lived in rural areas.

Racial composition as of the 2020 census
Race	Number	Percent
White	232	88.9%
Black or African American	2	0.8%
American Indian and Alaska Native	4	1.5%
Asian	0	0.0%
Native Hawaiian and Other Pacific Islander	0	0.0%
Some other race	9	3.4%
Two or more races	14	5.4%
Hispanic or Latino (of any race)	32	12.3%

=== 2000 census ===
As of the 2000 census, there were 282 people, 111 households, and 79 families residing in the city. The population density was 339.8 inhabitants per square mile (131.2/km^{2}). There were 122 housing units at an average density of 147.0 per square mile (56.8/km^{2}). The racial makeup of the city was 90.78% White, 3.19% African American, 0.35% Native American, 2.84% from other races, and 2.84% from two or more races. Hispanic or Latino of any race were 6.38% of the population.

There were 111 households, out of which 31.5% had children under the age of 18 living with them, 55.0% were married couples living together, and 28.8% were non-families. 22.5% of all households were made up of individuals, and 9.9% had someone living alone who was 65 years of age or older. The average household size was 2.54 and the average family size was 2.99.

In the city, the population was spread out, with 27.0% under the age of 18, 10.3% from 18 to 24, 26.2% from 25 to 44, 24.1% from 45 to 64, and 12.4% who were 65 years of age or older. The median age was 35 years. For every 100 females, there were 86.8 males. For every 100 females age 18 and over, there were 94.3 males.

The median income for a household in the city was $38,214, and the median income for a family was $45,179. Males had a median income of $35,972 versus $23,750 for females. The per capita income for the city was $18,874. About 13.9% of families and 9.6% of the population were below the poverty line, including 4.4% of those under the age of eighteen and 23.4% of those 65 or over.

== Education ==
The city is served by the Covington Independent School District.

In the early 1860s, Gathings College was founded by brothers James and Philip Gathings. It quickly became the largest school in the state with an enrollment that exceeded 200 students. The first president of the college was one Dr. Church, who brought his own staff of teachers. The school offered classes in languages, literature, music, and art. Attendance dwindled to nearly nothing after the Civil War. Some manner of school continued to operate in the building until it became incorporated into the Covington Independent School District. The original building no longer stands, but the site is marked with an historical placard.
