= Godley, Texas =

- City
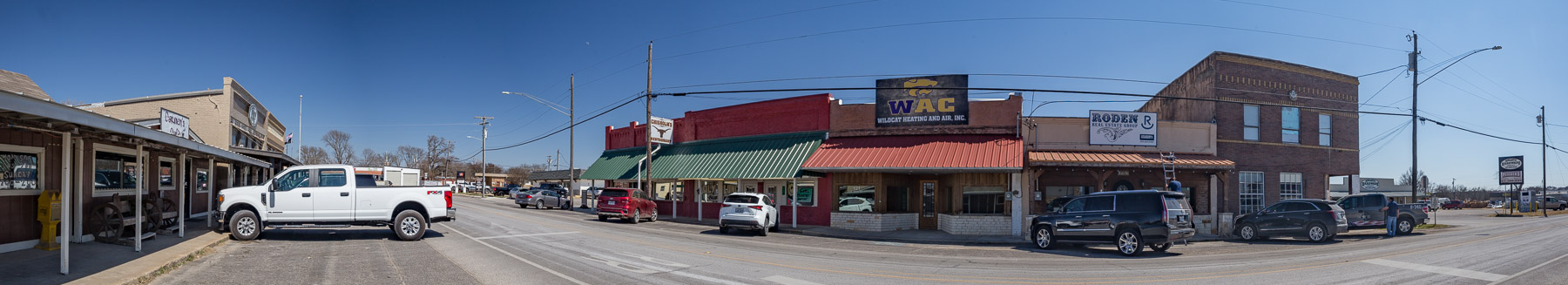
- Downtown Godley (2022)

- Location in Johnson County and the state of Texas
- Coordinates: 32°29′34″N 97°31′46″W
- Country: United States
- State: Texas
- County: Johnson

Area
  - Total: 2.20 sq mi (5.69 km^{2})
  - Land: 2.18 sq mi (5.65 km^{2})
  - Water: 0.015 sq mi (0.04 km^{2})
- Elevation: 955 ft (291 m)

Population (2020)
  - Total: 1,420
  - Estimate (2025): 5,093
  - Density: 651/sq mi (251/km^{2})
- Time zone: UTC-6 (Central (CST))
  - Summer (DST): UTC-5 (CDT)
- ZIP code: 76044
- Area codes: 817, 682
- FIPS code: 48-29972
- GNIS feature ID: 2410607
- Website: godleytx.gov

Godley is a city in northwestern Johnson County, Texas, United States, in the Dallas–Fort Worth metroplex. It is on Texas State Highway 171, Farm Roads 2331 and 917, and the tracks of the Atchison, Topeka and Santa Fe Railway northwest of Cleburne. As of 2025, the estimated population was 5,093, up from 1,450 in 2020.

== History ==
Godley was established in 1886 and named for R. B. Godley, a Cleburne lumber merchant who donated an 8-acre (3.2 ha) tract for a townsite and 20 acres (8.1 ha) of land as a right-of-way to the Gulf, Colorado and Santa Fe Railway. A station was constructed in 1886. By 1888, when the post office opened, Godley had a gristmill, three cotton gins, and two dairy-processing plants. Four years later, it had two general stores. By the mid-1920s, its population was 613. In 1930, it was 378, and 22 rated businesses operated locally. In the 1940s, the town had a population of 317 and 20 businesses. By 1956, it had a population of 424 and 16 businesses, and by 1990, it had 569 people and 12 businesses.

== Geography ==
Via Highway 171, it is 11 miles (18 km) northwest of Cleburne, the Johnson county seat, and 8 miles (13 km) southeast of Cresson. It is 30 miles (48 km) southwest of downtown Fort Worth.

According to the United States Census Bureau, Godley has a total area of 1.7 square miles (4.3 km^{2}), of which 0.01 sq mi (0.02 km^{2}), or 0.39%, is covered by water. It lies near the headwaters of the Nolan River watershed, a tributary of the Brazos River.

== Demographics ==
Historical population
Census	Pop.	Note	%±
1930	378		—
1940	317		−16.1%
1950	424		33.8%
1960	401		−5.4%
1970	533		32.9%
1980	614		15.2%
1990	569		−7.3%
2000	879		54.5%
2010	1,009		14.8%
2020	1,450		43.7%
2025 (est.)	5,093		251.2%
U.S. Decennial Census; 2020 Census

=== 2020 census ===
As of the 2020 census, Godley had a population of 1,450. The median age was 30.6 years. 30.7% of residents were under the age of 18 and 8.0% of residents were 65 years of age or older. For every 100 females there were 99.7 males, and for every 100 females age 18 and over there were 97.4 males age 18 and over.

0.0% of residents lived in urban areas, while 100.0% lived in rural areas.

There were 505 households in Godley, of which 49.1% had children under the age of 18 living in them. Of all households, 55.8% were married-couple households, 15.4% were households with a male householder and no spouse or partner present, and 21.6% were households with a female householder and no spouse or partner present. About 17.6% of all households were made up of individuals and 8.1% had someone living alone who was 65 years of age or older.

There were 555 housing units, of which 9.0% were vacant. The homeowner vacancy rate was 4.7% and the rental vacancy rate was 5.8%.

Racial composition as of the 2020 census
Race	Number	Percent
White	1,205	83.1%
Black or African American	38	2.6%
American Indian and Alaska Native	13	0.9%
Asian	3	0.2%
Native Hawaiian and Other Pacific Islander	1	0.1%
Some other race	36	2.5%
Two or more races	154	10.6%
Hispanic or Latino (of any race)	171	11.8%

=== 2000 census ===
As of the 2000 census, 879 people, 296 households, and 235 families resided in the city. The population density was 523.7 inhabitants per square mile (202.2/km^{2}). The 313 housing units had an average density of 186.5 per square mile (72.0/km^{2}). The racial makeup of the city was 94.43% White, 0.46% African American, 0.80% Native American, 2.73% from other races, and 1.59% from two or more races. Hispanics or Latinos of any race were 10.13% of the population.

Of the 296 households, 45.3% had children under 18 living with them, 61.1% were married couples living together, 13.2% had a female householder with no husband present, and 20.3% were not families. About 17.6% of all households were made up of individuals, and 8.8% had someone living alone who was 65 or older. The average household size was 2.95 and the average family size was 3.34.

In the city, the age distribution was 32.5% under 18, 9.1% from 18 to 24, 28.7% from 25 to 44, 20.4% from 45 to 64, and 9.3% who were 65 or older. The median age was 31 years. For every 100 females, there were 84.7 males. For every 100 females 18 and over, there were 88.3 males.

The median income for a household in the city was $40,667, and for a family was $44,583. Males had a median income of $37,692 versus $23,571 for females. The per capita income for the city was $14,556. About 5.2% of families and 7.7% of the population were below the poverty line, including 6.9% of those under age 18 and 6.6% of those age 65 or over.

As of 2025 the estimated population for the city was recorded at 5,410. Godley is one of the fastest growing city’s in the Dallas-Fort Worth area.

== Education ==
Public education in the city is provided by the Godley Independent School District.
