= Alvarado, Texas =

Alvarado
- City
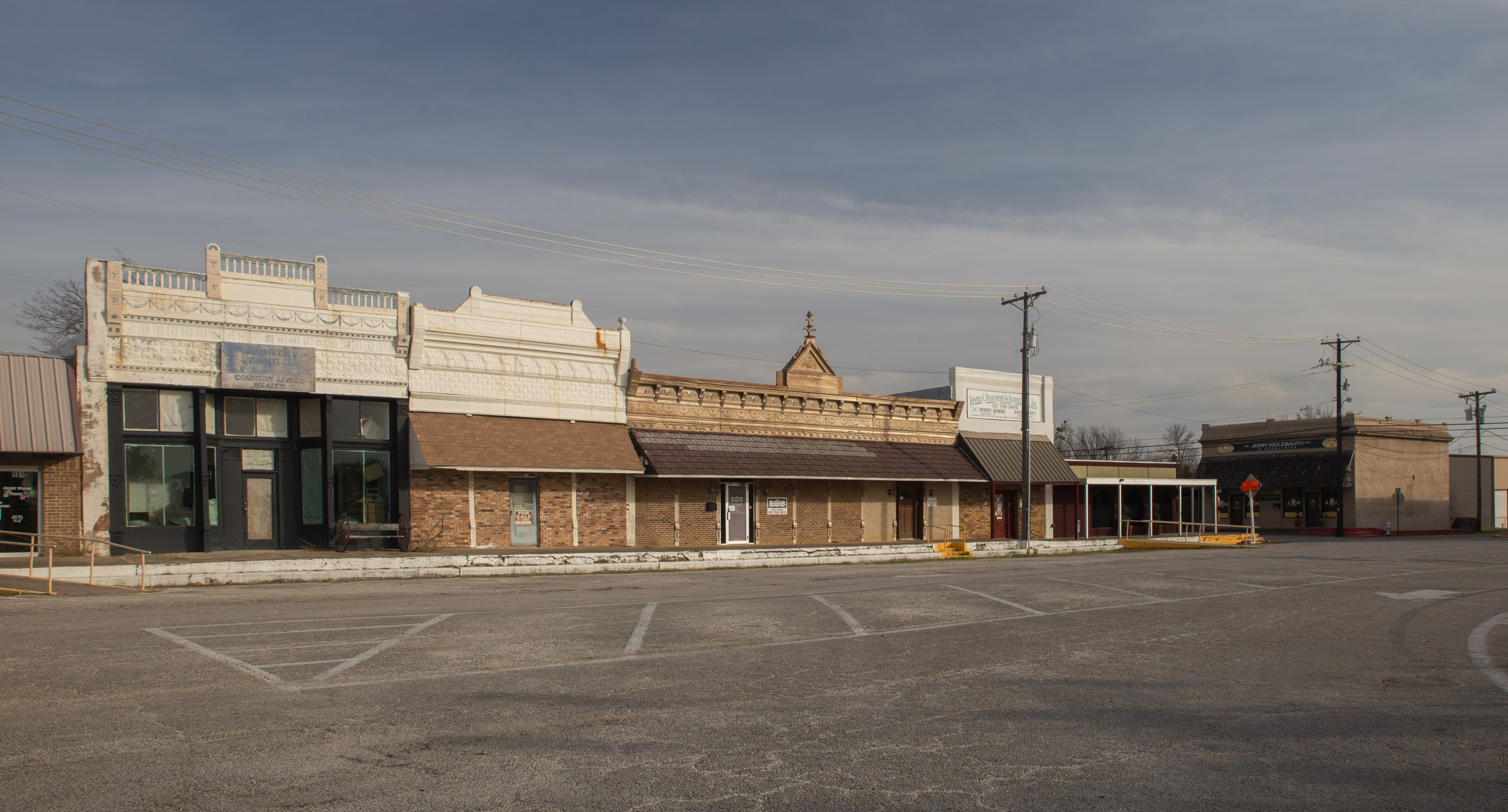
- Downtown Alvarado, December 2019
- Motto: "The Crossroads of Johnson County"
- Interactive map of Alvarado
- Location within Texas Location within the United States Location within North America
- Coordinates: 32°23′23″N 97°14′12″W
- Country: United States
- State: Texas
- County: Johnson
- Incorporated (city): 1885

Government
  - Type: Manager-council government

Area
  - Total: 4.90 sq mi (12.68 km^{2})
  - Land: 4.15 sq mi (10.76 km^{2})
  - Water: 0.74 sq mi (1.92 km^{2})
- Elevation: 725 ft (221 m)

Population (2020)
  - Total: 4,739
  - Density: 1,141/sq mi (440.4/km^{2})
- Time zone: UTC-6 (Central (CST))
  - Summer (DST): UTC-5 (CDT)
- ZIP code: 76009
- Area codes: 817, 682
- FIPS code: 48-02260
- GNIS feature ID: 2409691
- Website: www.cityofalvarado.org

Alvarado (/ˌælvəˈreɪdoʊ/ Al-va-ra-doe) is the oldest city in Johnson County, Texas, United States. Its population was 4,739 in 2020.

The community's first sheriff, A. H. Onstoott, is credited with naming the city for Alvarado, Veracruz, Mexico, where he fought in a battle during the Mexican–American War.

== Geography ==
Alvarado is located in eastern Johnson County at the intersection of US Highway 67 and Interstate 35W. The city is 26 miles (42 km) south of the center of Fort Worth and 39 miles (63 km) southwest of Dallas.

According to the U.S. Census Bureau, Alvarado has a total area of 4.8 square miles (12.5 km^{2}), of which 4.1 square miles (10.6 km^{2}) are land and 0.73 sq mi (1.9 km^{2}), or 15.35%, is covered by water. The water area comprises Alvarado Park Lake, a reservoir on Turkey Creek, 3 miles (5 km) southwest of the city. Alvarado is drained by the North Fork of Chambers Creek, a southeast-flowing stream that is part of the Trinity River watershed.

Alvarado's nearest neighboring communities are Venus to the east, Keene to the west, Burleson and Mansfield to the north, and Grandview and Cleburne to the south.

=== Climate ===
The climate in this area is characterized by hot, humid summers and generally mild to cool winters. According to the Köppen climate classification, Alvarado has a humid subtropical climate, Cfa on climate maps.

== Demographics ==
Historical population
Census	Pop.	Note	%±
1880	377		—
1890	1,543		309.3%
1900	1,342		−13.0%
1910	1,155		−13.9%
1920	1,284		11.2%
1930	1,210		−5.8%
1940	1,324		9.4%
1950	1,656		25.1%
1960	1,907		15.2%
1970	2,129		11.6%
1980	2,701		26.9%
1990	2,918		8.0%
2000	3,288		12.7%
2010	3,785		15.1%
2020	4,739		25.2%
2023 (est.)	6,225		31.4%
U.S. Decennial Census

=== 2020 census ===
As of the 2020 census, Alvarado had a population of 4,739, 1,603 households, and 1,184 families residing in the city. The median age was 33.6 years. About 28.9% of residents were under 18 and 11.8% were 65 or older. For every 100 females, there were 95.9 males, and for every 100 females 18 and over, there were 90.9 males 18 and over.

About 96.2% of residents lived in urban areas, while 3.8% lived in rural areas.

Of the 1,603 households in Alvarado, 42.8% had children under 18 living in them, 50.2% were married-couple households, 14.9% were households with a male householder and no spouse or partner present, and 27.1% were households with a female householder and no spouse or partner present. About 22.4% of all households were made up of individuals, and 9.0% had someone living alone who was 65 or older.

The city had 1,747 housing units, of which 8.2% were vacant. Among occupied housing units, 64.2% were owner-occupied and 35.8% were renter-occupied. The homeowner vacancy rate was 2.3% and the rental vacancy rate was 3.9%.

Racial composition as of the 2020 census
Race	Percentage
White	67.1%
Black or African American	5.7%
American Indian and Alaska Native	1.1%
Asian	0.8%
Native Hawaiian and other Pacific Islander	0.1%
Some other race	9.4%
Two or more races	15.9%
Hispanic or Latino (of any race)	27.2%

Alvarado racial composition as of 2020 (NH = Non-Hispanic) (Note: Note: the US Census treats Hispanic/Latino as an ethnic category. This table excludes Latinos from the racial categories and assigns them to a separate category. Hispanics/Latinos can be of any race.)
Race	Number	Percentage
White (NH)	2,875	60.67%
Black or African American (NH)	256	5.4%
Native American or Alaska Native (NH)	22	0.46%
Asian (NH)	35	0.74%
Pacific Islander (NH)	3	0.06%
Some other race (NH)	13	0.27%
Multiracial (NH)	248	5.23%
Hispanic or Latino	1,287	27.16%
Total	4,739	

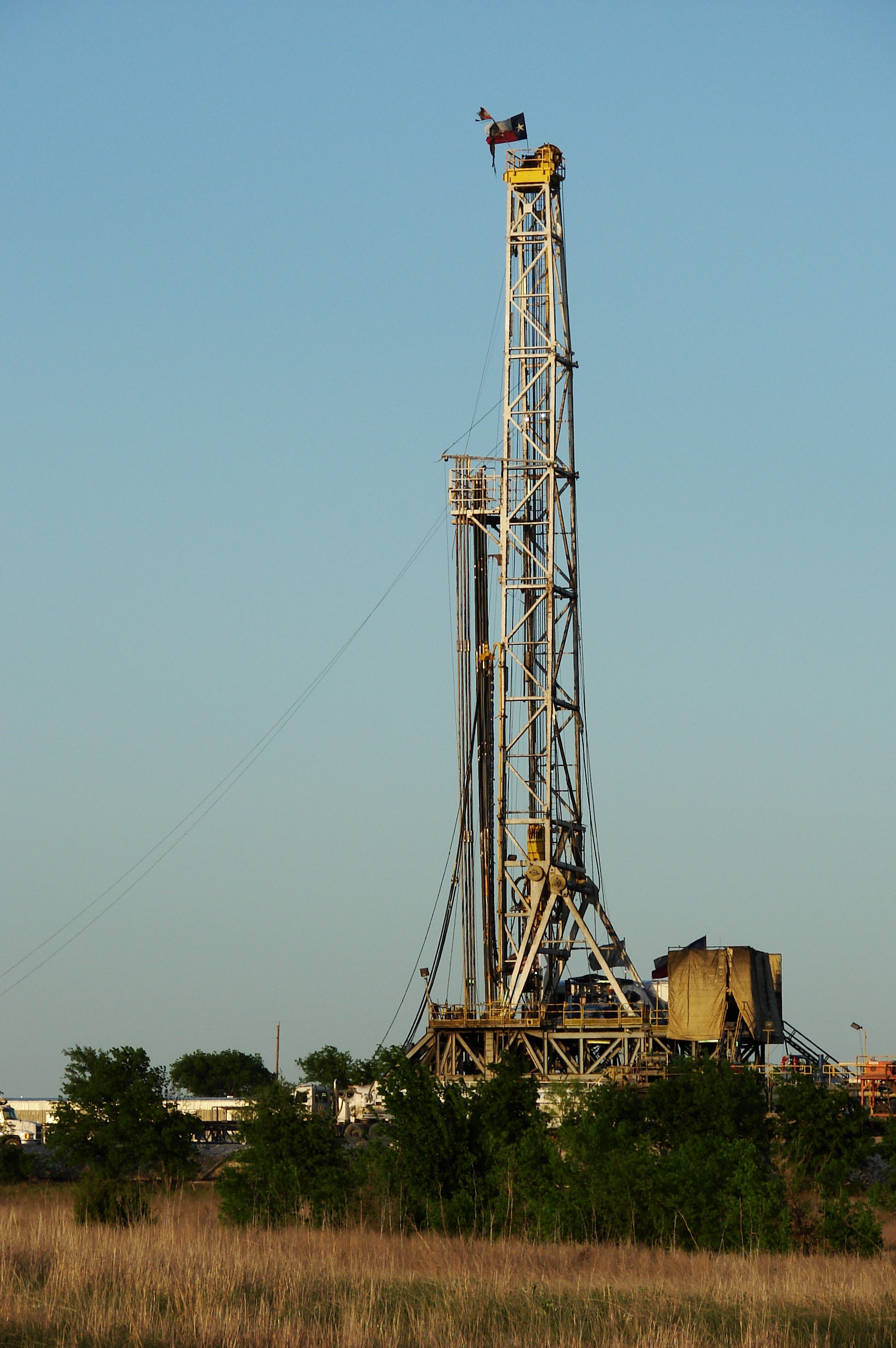
Barnett Shale gas drilling rig near Alvarado, Texas (2008)

== Economy ==
Alvarado is a rural community with an economy that has been primarily agricultural with only a modest retail and industrial base. In recent years, the trend has been away from agriculture and toward more urban development. In 2007, Sabre Tubular Structures built a new 200,000-square-foot (19,000 m^{2}) facility located on 147 acres (59 ha) on the east side of town. Sabre has over 200 employees at this facility. The city received a 2008 grant of $750,000 from the Texas Department of Agriculture for infrastructure improvements related to Sabre.

Louis Vuitton operates a factory for leather goods outside of Alvarado.

=== Barnett Shale ===
In the latter part of the 2000s, development of natural gas wells in the Barnett Shale were a source of prosperity for the city, and many property owners benefited from drilling activity, pipeline construction, and royalty payments. As natural gas prices fell in 2009, drilling activity and royalty payments declined rapidly.

== Recreation ==
- Alvarado Park Lake is located on the west side of the city, 3 miles (5 km) west of I-35W.
- Alvarado Parkway Park

== Government ==
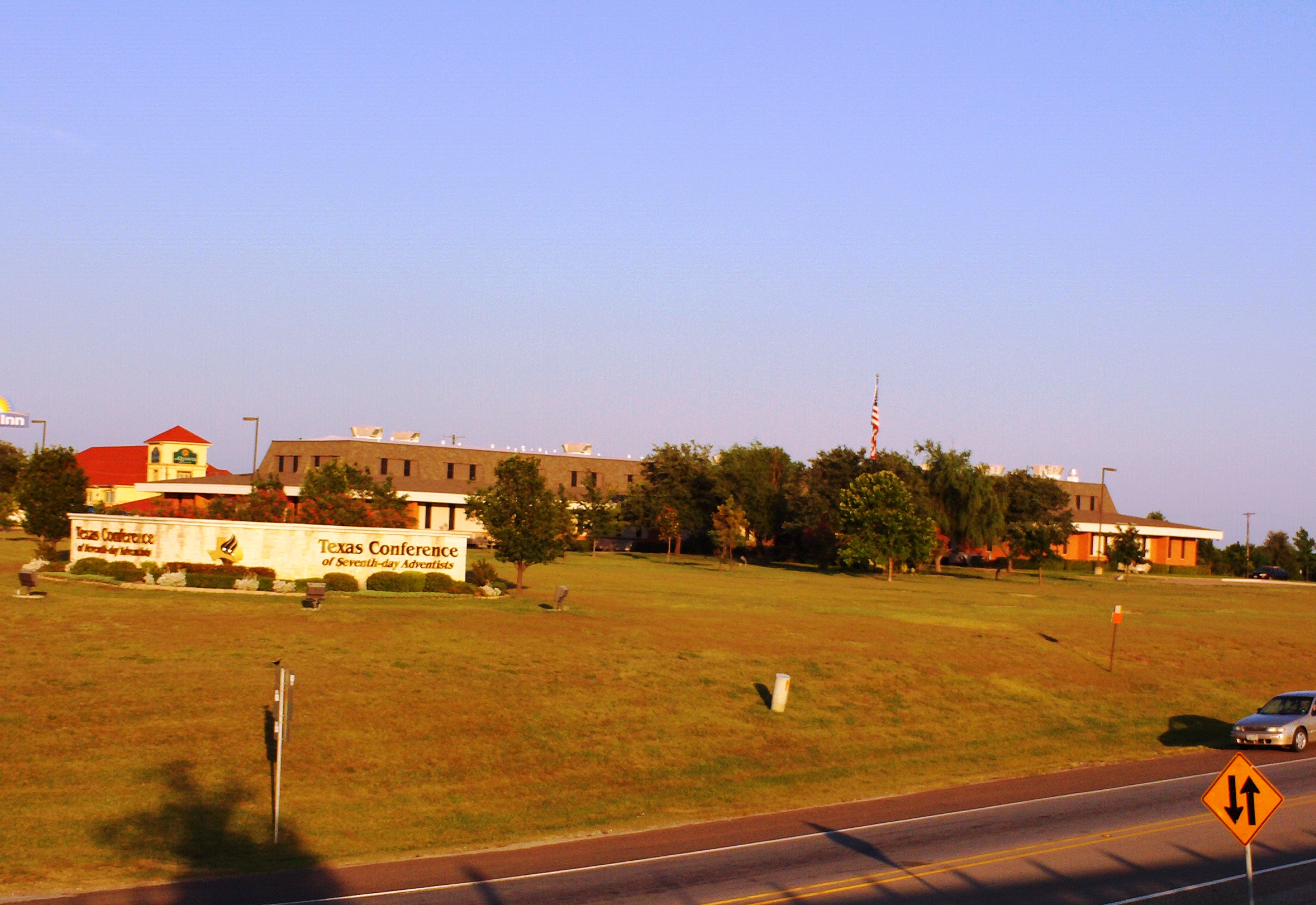
Texas Conference of Seventh-day Adventists building

The city uses a council-manager government, with a mayor and six city council members representing three wards, one being the mayor pro tempore.

The city's 2009–10 general fund budget was $3.9 million.

== Education ==
The city is served by the Alvarado Independent School District.

The Texas Education Code specifies that Johnson County is in the Hill College service area. No colleges or universities are in Alvarado, although residents pay a Hill College maintenance tax and residents receive in-district student rates.

== Notable people ==
- Terry Southern, author, born in Alvarado
- Johnny Trigg, professional barbecuer known as the Rib King
- Austin Wolf, pornographic film actor and convicted sex offender

== See also ==
- List of cities in Texas
