= Grandview, Texas =

- City
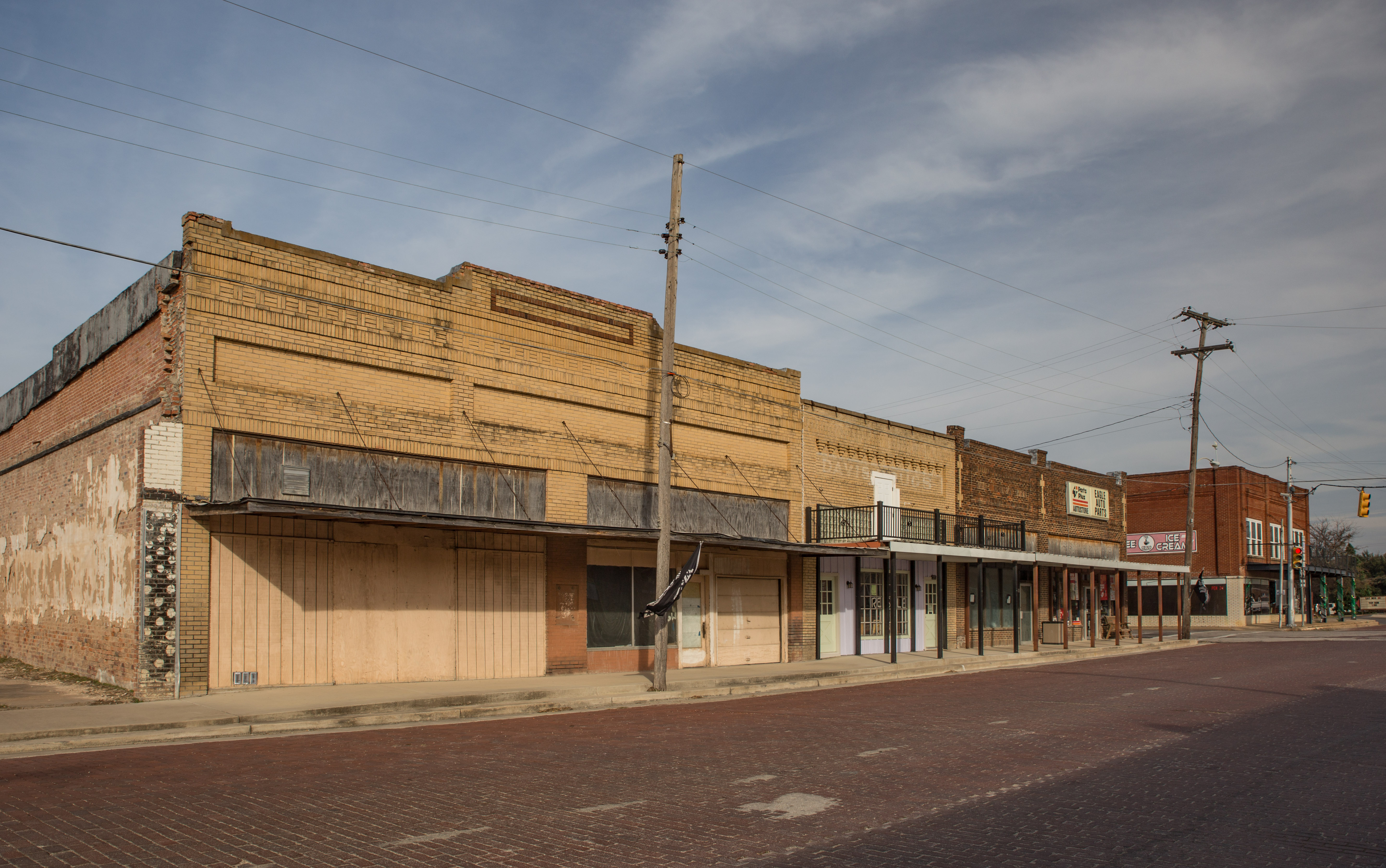
- Downtown Grandview
- Interactive map of Grandview, Texas
- Location in Texas Location in the United States
- Coordinates: 32°15′56″N 97°10′40″W
- Country: United States
- State: Texas
- County: Johnson

Area
  - Total: 1.81 sq mi (4.69 km^{2})
  - Land: 1.81 sq mi (4.69 km^{2})
  - Water: 0 sq mi (0.00 km^{2})
- Elevation: 686 ft (209 m)

Population (2020)
  - Total: 1,879
  - Density: 1,040/sq mi (401/km^{2})
- Time zone: UTC-6 (Central (CST))
  - Summer (DST): UTC-5 (CDT)
- ZIP code: 76050
- Area codes: 817, 682
- FIPS code: 48-30512
- GNIS feature ID: 2410637
- Website: www.cityofgrandview.org

Grandview is a city in Johnson County, Texas, United States. The population was 1,561 at the 2010 census, and 1,879 in 2020.

David's Supermarkets, an independent chain of grocery stores, was headquartered in Grandview before being acquired by Brookshire Brothers in 2014.

Grandview's school district was ranked one of the best school districts in the state of Texas as of (2016).

== Geography ==
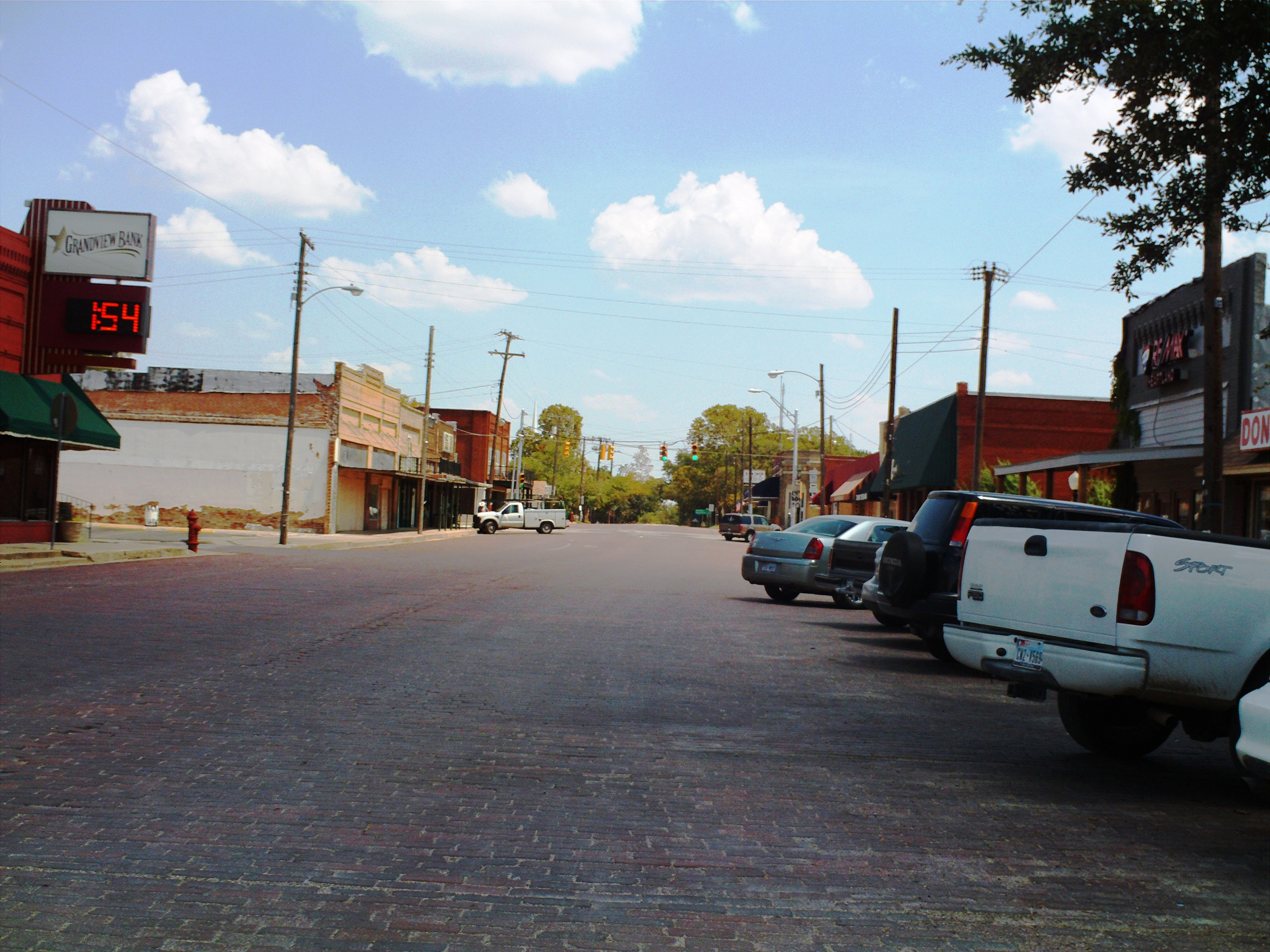
Business district street scene in Grandview

Grandview is located in southeastern Johnson County. Interstate 35W runs through the east side of the city, leading north 37 miles (60 km) to the center of Fort Worth and south 19 miles (31 km) to Hillsboro. Texas State Highway 81 leads through the center of Grandview, leading south 8 miles (13 km) to Itasca.

According to the United States Census Bureau, Grandview has a total area of 1.8 square miles (4.7 km^{2}), of which 0.8 acres (3,157 m^{2}), or 0.07%, are water.

== Demographics ==
Historical population
Census	Pop.	Note	%±
1880	287		—
1890	257		−10.5%
1900	713		177.4%
1910	1,018		42.8%
1920	1,084		6.5%
1930	892		−17.7%
1940	823		−7.7%
1950	886		7.7%
1960	961		8.5%
1970	935		−2.7%
1980	1,205		28.9%
1990	1,245		3.3%
2000	1,358		9.1%
2010	1,561		14.9%
2020	1,879		20.4%
U.S. Decennial Census

=== 2020 census ===
As of the 2020 census, Grandview had a population of 1,879, a median age of 33.9 years, 29.3% of residents under the age of 18, and 14.4% of residents who were 65 years of age or older. For every 100 females there were 93.1 males, and for every 100 females age 18 and over there were 81.3 males age 18 and over.

Racial composition as of the 2020 census
Race	Number	Percent
White	1,461	77.8%
Black or African American	72	3.8%
American Indian and Alaska Native	17	0.9%
Asian	17	0.9%
Native Hawaiian and Other Pacific Islander	1	0.1%
Some other race	101	5.4%
Two or more races	210	11.2%
Hispanic or Latino (of any race)	313	16.7%

There were 651 households in Grandview, of which 48.4% had children under the age of 18 living in them. Of all households, 49.0% were married-couple households, 13.4% were households with a male householder and no spouse or partner present, and 30.7% were households with a female householder and no spouse or partner present. About 24.9% of all households were made up of individuals and 12.7% had someone living alone who was 65 years of age or older.

There were 692 housing units, of which 5.9% were vacant. The homeowner vacancy rate was 2.9% and the rental vacancy rate was 2.3%.

0.0% of residents lived in urban areas, while 100.0% lived in rural areas.

== Education ==
The city is served by the Grandview Independent School District.
