= Rio Vista, Texas =

City in Johnson County, Texas, United States

- City
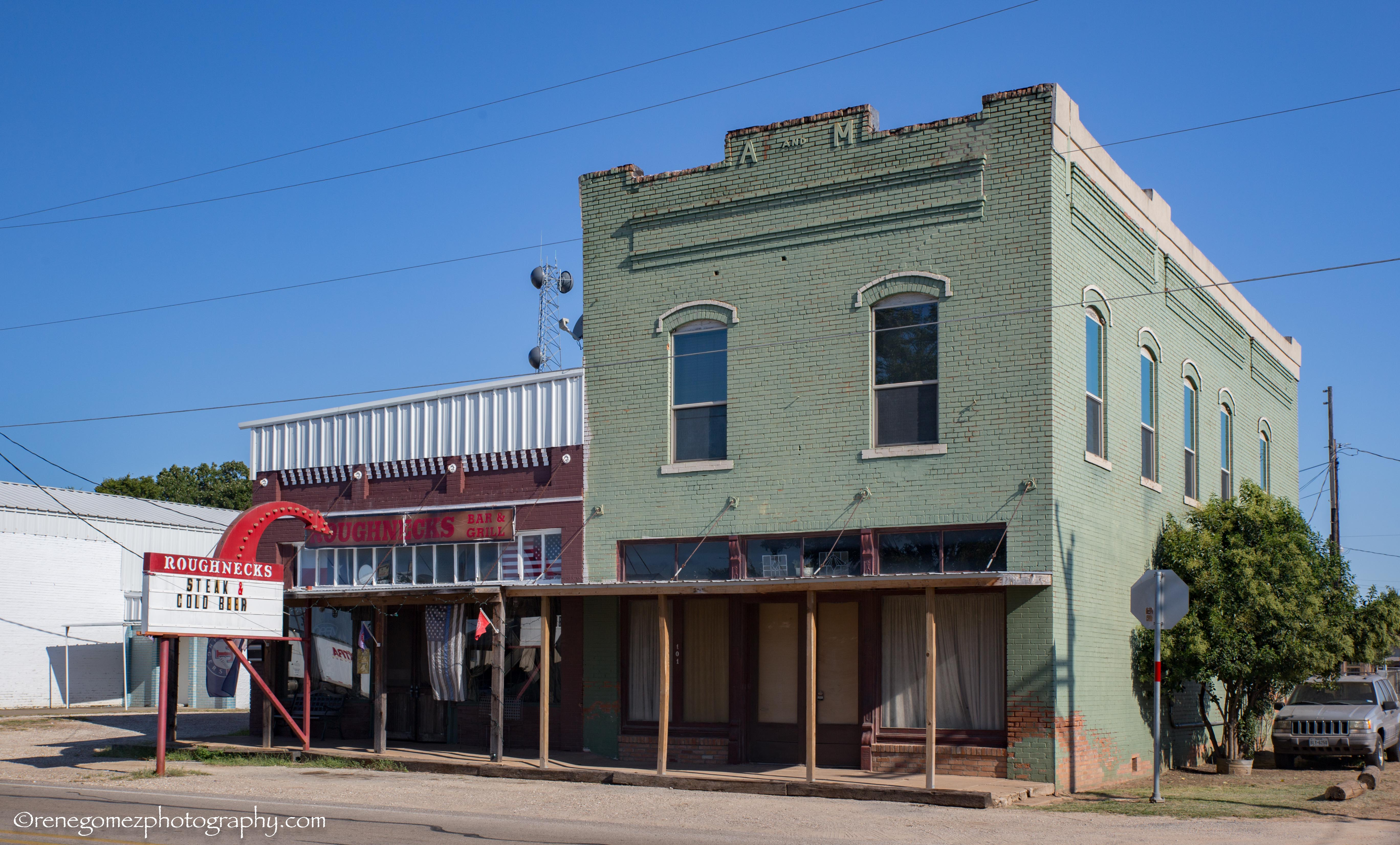
- Downtown Rio Vista, September 2018

- Location in Johnson County and the state of Texas
- Coordinates: 32°14′26″N 97°22′40″W
- Country: United States
- State: Texas
- County: Johnson

Area
  - Total: 1.06 sq mi (2.74 km^{2})
  - Land: 1.05 sq mi (2.73 km^{2})
  - Water: 0.0039 sq mi (0.01 km^{2})
- Elevation: 732 ft (223 m)

Population (2020)
  - Total: 1,008
  - Density: 956/sq mi (369/km^{2})
- Time zone: UTC-6 (Central (CST))
  - Summer (DST): UTC-5 (CDT)
- ZIP code: 76093
- Area code: 817
- FIPS code: 48-62240
- GNIS feature ID: 2410956
- Website: riovista-tx.com

Rio Vista is a city in Johnson County, Texas, United States. The population was 1,008 in 2020.

== Geography ==
Rio Vista is located in southern Johnson County. Texas State Highway 174 passes through the west side of the city, leading north 8 miles (13 km) to Cleburne, the county seat, and southwest 30 miles (48 km) to Meridian.

According to the United States Census Bureau, Rio Vista has a total area of 1.0 square mile (2.7 km^{2}), of which 2.0 acres (7,995 m^{2}), or 0.29%, are water. The city's area drains to the Nolan River, a tributary of the Brazos River.

== Demographics ==
Historical population
Census	Pop.	Note	%±
1960	284		—
1970	370		30.3%
1980	509		37.6%
1990	541		6.3%
2000	656		21.3%
2010	873		33.1%
2020	1,008		15.5%
U.S. Decennial Census

=== 2020 census ===
As of the 2020 census, Rio Vista had a population of 1,008, a median age of 32.8 years, 28.2% of residents under the age of 18, and 12.1% of residents aged 65 years or older. For every 100 females there were 101.6 males, and for every 100 females age 18 and over there were 97.3 males age 18 and over.

0.0% of residents lived in urban areas, while 100.0% lived in rural areas.

There were 345 households in Rio Vista, of which 47.0% had children under the age of 18 living in them. Of all households, 52.2% were married-couple households, 15.4% were households with a male householder and no spouse or partner present, and 24.6% were households with a female householder and no spouse or partner present. About 17.7% of all households were made up of individuals and 10.5% had someone living alone who was 65 years of age or older.

There were 374 housing units, of which 7.8% were vacant. The homeowner vacancy rate was 3.7% and the rental vacancy rate was 3.2%.

Racial composition as of the 2020 census
Race	Number	Percent
White	869	86.2%
Black or African American	5	0.5%
American Indian and Alaska Native	7	0.7%
Asian	0	0.0%
Native Hawaiian and Other Pacific Islander	0	0.0%
Some other race	56	5.6%
Two or more races	71	7.0%
Hispanic or Latino (of any race)	135	13.4%

== Education ==
The city is served by the Rio Vista Independent School District.

== See also ==
- List of municipalities in Texas
