= List of lakes of Texas =

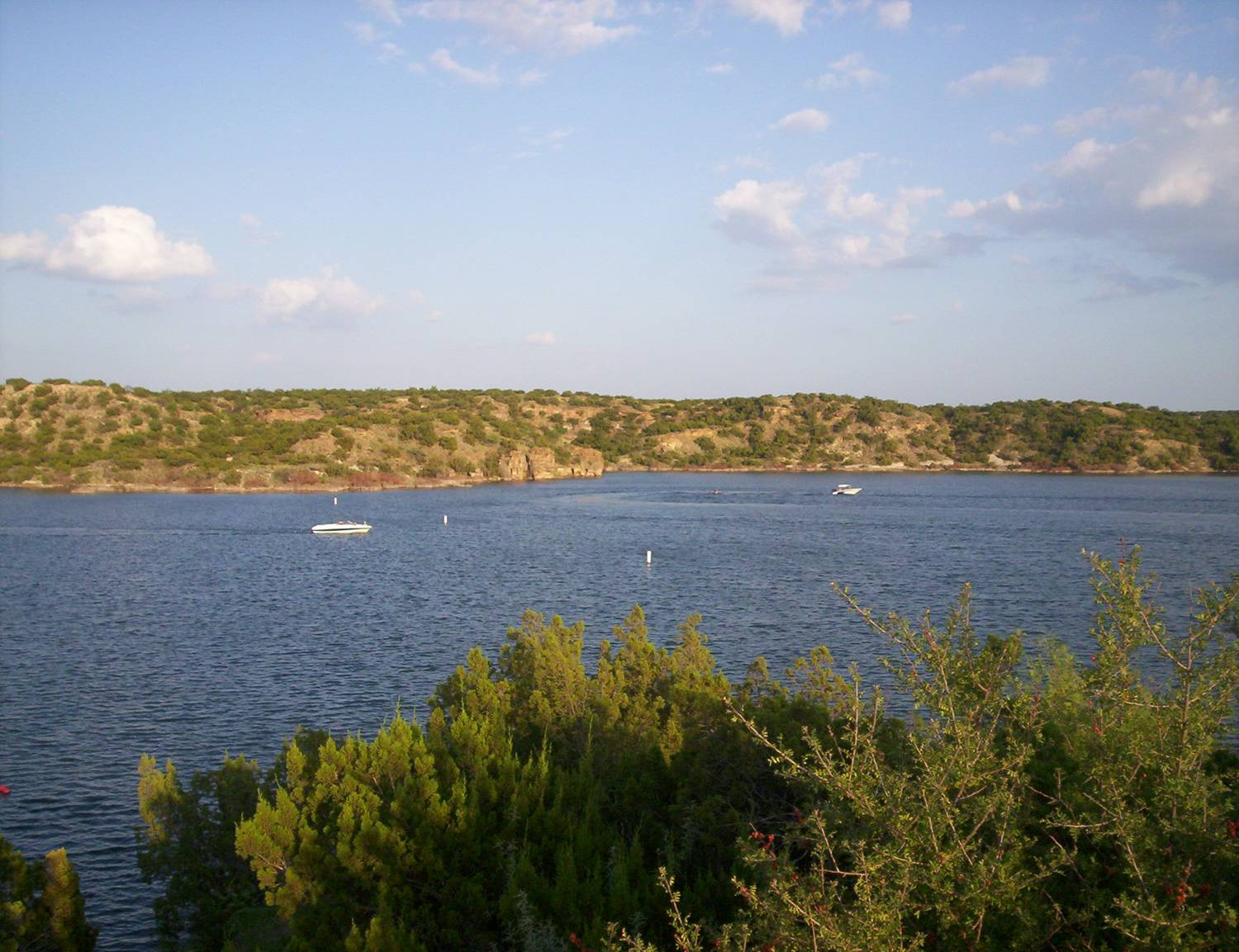
Lake Alan Henry

The following is a list of reservoirs and lakes in the U.S. state of Texas. Swimming, fishing, and/or boating are permitted in some of these lakes, but not all.

== A ==
- Lake Abilene
- Addicks Reservoir
- Lake Alan Henry
- Alvarado Park Lake
- Amistad Reservoir (extends into Coahuila, Mexico)
- Lake Amon G. Carter
- Lake Anahuac (once known as Turtle Bay)
- Aquilla Lake
- Amarillo Lake
- Lake Arlington (Texas)
- Lake Arrowhead
- Lake Athens (formerly known as Flat Creek Reservoir)
- Lake Austin
- Averhoff Reservoir

== B ==
- Lake B. A. Steinhagen
- Balmorhea Lake
- Lake Bardwell
- Lake Bastrop
- Baylor Creek Reservoir
- Lake Bellwood
- Belton Lake
- Benbrook Lake
- Big Creek Reservoir
- Big Lake
- Blue Wing Lake
- Lake Bob Sandlin
- Lake Boehmer
- Bois D'Arc Lake
- Lake Bonham
- Bonham State Park Lake
- Boerne City Lake
- Brady Creek Reservoir
- Brandy Branch Reservoir
- Braunig Lake
- Lake Brelsford
- Brevelle Lake
- Lake Bridgeport (formerly known as Bridgeport Reservoir)
- Brumley Lake
- Lake Brownwood
- Lake Bryan
- Lake Bryson
- Lake Buchanan
- Buffalo Creek Reservoir
- Buffalo Springs Reservoir

== C ==
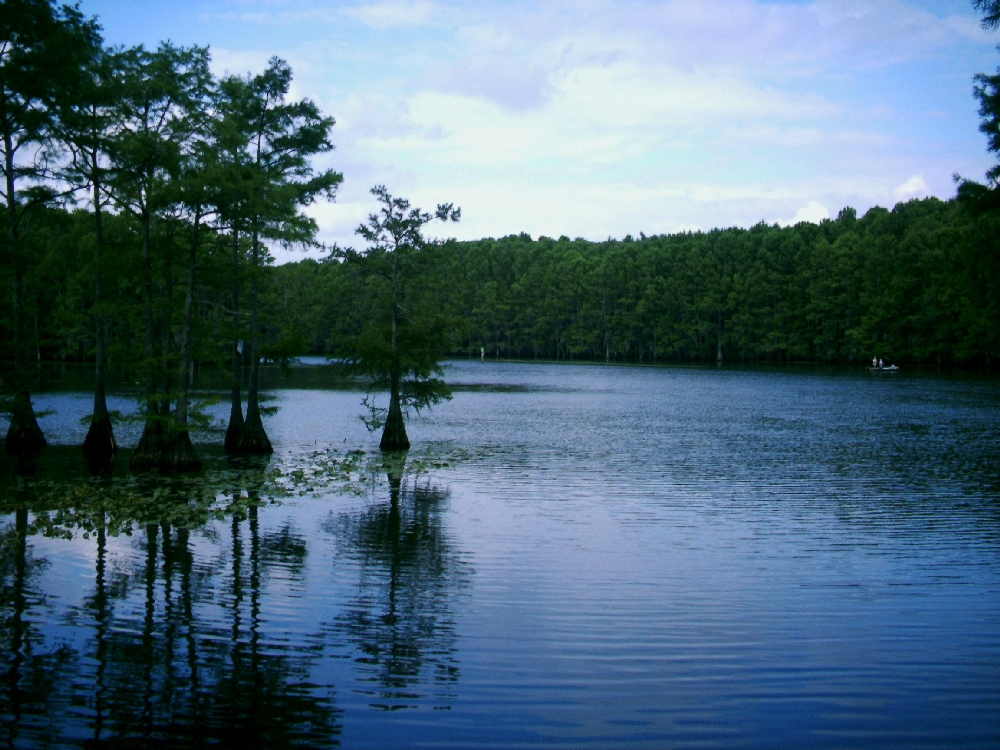
Caddo Lake

- Caddo Lake (extends into Louisiana)
- Calaveras Lake
- Canyon Lake
- Lake Casa Blanca
- Cedar Creek Reservoir
- Cedar Lake
- Champion Creek Reservoir
- Lake Charlotte
- Lake Cherokee
- Lake Childress
- Choke Canyon Reservoir
- Lake Cisco
- Lake Pat Cleburne
- Lake Clyde
- Coffee Mill Lake
- Coleto Creek Reservoir
- Lake Coleman
- Lake Colorado City
- Lake Conroe
- Cooper Lake (see Jim Chapman Lake)
- Lake Corpus Christi
- Lake Crook
- Lake Cypress Springs

== D ==
- Lake Daniel
- Davy Crockett Lake
- Lake Diversion
- Lake Dunlap

== E ==
- Eagle Mountain Lake
- Lake Eanes
- Lake Eastland
- Lake Eddleman
- Lake El Paso
- E.V. Spence Reservoir

== F ==
- Fairfield Lake
- Falcon International Reservoir
- Fayette County Reservoir
- Lake Findley
- Lake Fork
- Fort Parker State Park Lake
- Fort Phantom Hill Lake
- Lake Fryer (originally known as Wolf Creek Lake)

== G ==
- Lake Georgetown (formerly known as North Fork Lake, and Georgetown Dam)
- Gibbons Creek Reservoir
- Lake Gilmer
- Lake Gladewater
- Lake Gonzales
- Lake Graham
- Lake Granbury
- Granger Lake
- Grapevine Lake
- Greenbriar Lake
- Green Lake
- Greenbelt Reservoir
- Greenville Club Lake

== H ==
- Lake Halbert
- Lake Hawkins
- Lake Holbrook
- Hords Creek Reservoir
- Lake Houston
- Houston County Lake
- Hubbard Creek Lake
- Howell Lake
- Hamrick Lake

== I ==
- Imperial Reservoir
- Inks Lake
- Lake Iowa Park

== J ==
- Lake J. B. Thomas
- Lake Jacksonville
- Lake Jane
- Jim Chapman Lake
- Joe Pool Lake

== K ==
- Lake Kemp
- Lake Kickapoo
- Kaufman Lake
- Kirby Lake
- Lake Kurth

== L ==
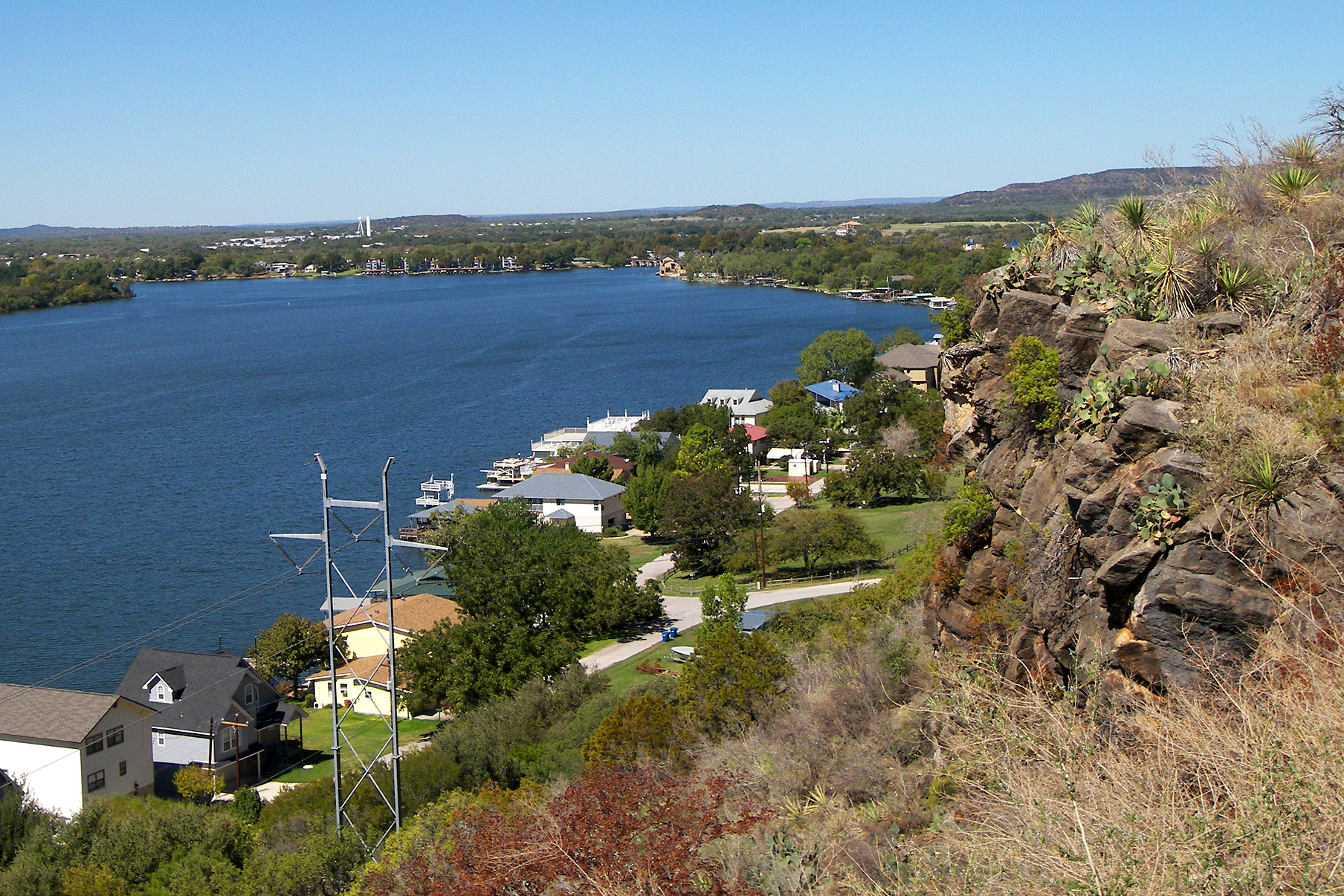
Lake Lyndon B. Johnson

- Lady Bird Lake (formerly Town Lake)
- Lake La Joya
- Lake Creek Lake
- Lake Fork Reservoir
- Lake Lavon
- Lake Leon (Eastland County, Texas)
- Lake Leon (Pecos County, Texas)
- Lewisville Lake
- Lake Limestone
- Lake Livingston
- Lone Star Lake
- Lost Creek Reservoir
- Lake Lyndon B. Johnson
- Lake O' the Pines

== M ==
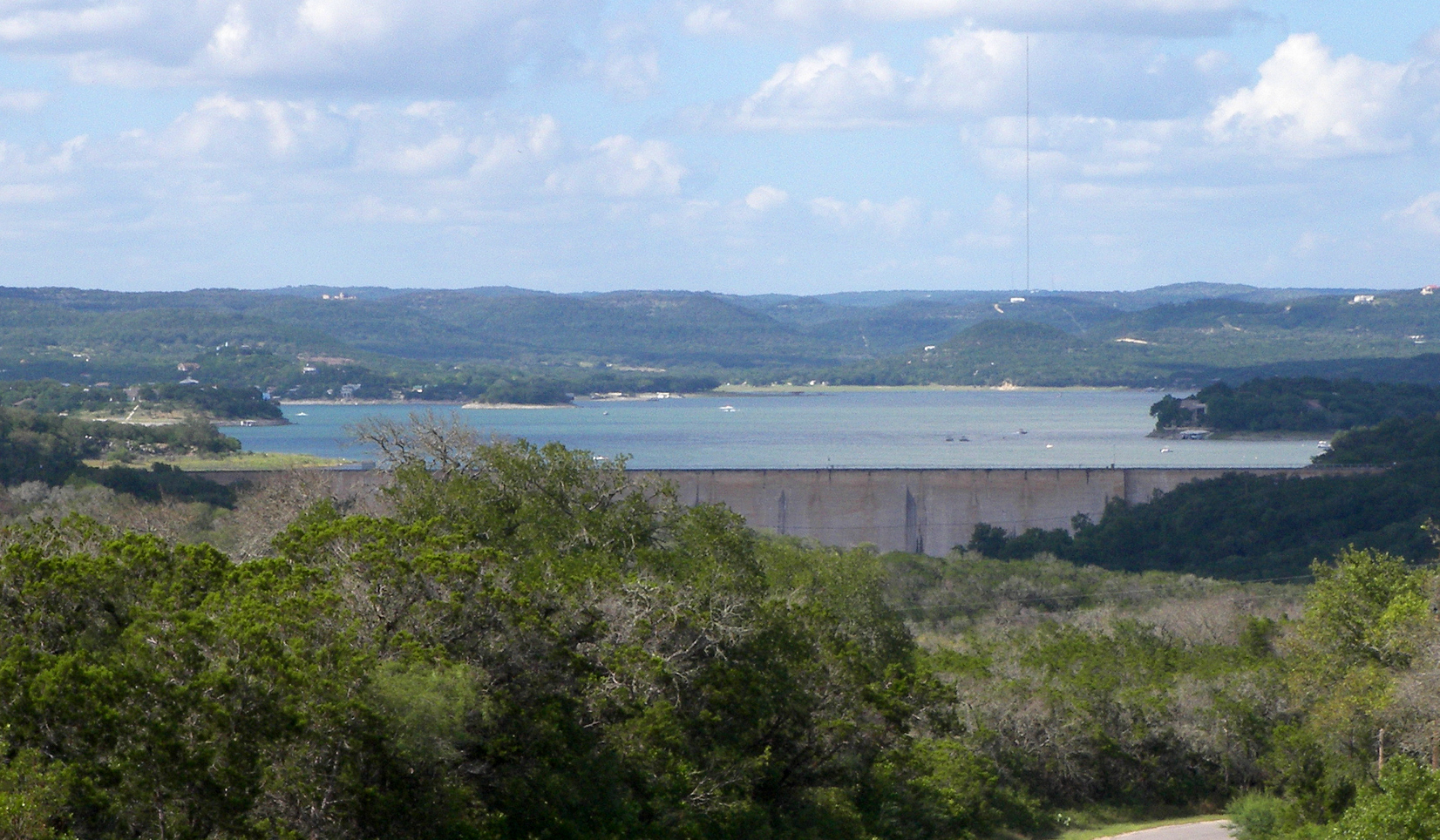
Medina Lake

- Mackenzie Reservoir
- Marine Creek Reservoir
- Lake Marble Falls
- Lake Marvin (Hemphill County, Texas)
- Lake McClellan (McClellan Reservoir)
- McGovern Lake, Hermann Park, Houston
- Lake McQueeney
- Lake McSpadden
- Meadow Lake
- Medina Lake
- Lake Meredith
- Lake Mexia
- Millers Creek Reservoir
- Lake Mineral Wells
- Mitchell Lake
- Lake Monticello
- Moss Lake, Howard County
- Mountain Creek Lake
- Mud Lake
- Murphy Lake, Anderson County
- Lake Murvaul, Panola County
- Mustang Lake
- Lake Meredith National Recreation Area

== N ==
- Lake Nacogdoches
- Lake Naconiche
- Lake Nasworthy
- Navarro Mills Lake
- Negrohead Lake
- New Ballinger Lake
- Lake Nocona
- North Lake (disambiguation)

== O ==
- O.C. Fisher Reservoir
- O.H. Ivie Lake
- Oak Creek Reservoir

== P ==
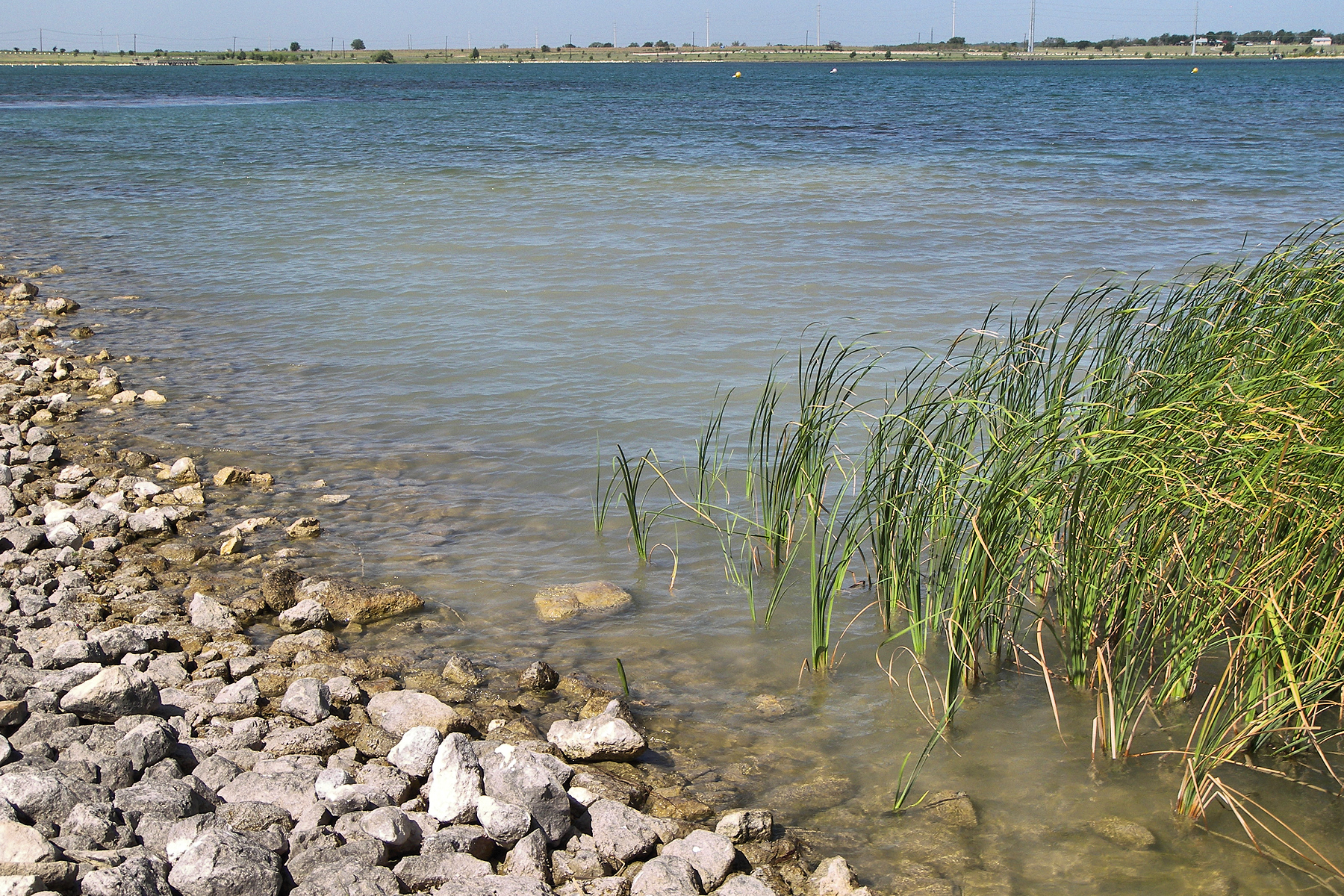
Lake Pflugerville

- Padera Lake
- Lake Palestine
- Palo Duro Reservoir
- Lake Palo Pinto
- Lake Pat Cleburne
- Pat Mayse Lake
- Lake Pauline
- Lake Pflugerville
- Lake Pinkston
- Lake Placid
- Lake Plainview
- Palo Pinto Creek Reservoir
- Plunk Lake
- Possum Kingdom Lake (Possum Kingdom Reservoir)
- Proctor Lake
- Purtis Creek State Park Lake

== Q ==
- Lake Quitman

== R ==
- Lake Randell
- Lake Raven
- Lake Ray Hubbard
- Lake Ray Roberts
- Red Bluff Reservoir
- Richland-Chambers Reservoir
- Rucker Pond

== S ==
- Sabine Lake (extends into Louisiana)
- Sam Rayburn Reservoir
- Lake Scarborough
- Sheldon Reservoir
- Smithers Lake
- Somerville Lake
- Squaw Creek Reservoir
- Lake Stamford
- Stillhouse Hollow Lake
- Lake Striker
- Lake Sulphur Springs
- Lake Sweetwater

== T ==
- Lake Tanglewood
- Lake Tawakoni
- Lake Tejas
- Lake Texana
- Texas Highland Lakes
- Lake Texoma (extends into Oklahoma)
- Timpson Reservoir
- Toledo Bend Reservoir (extends into Louisiana)
- Tradinghouse Creek Reservoir
- Lake Travis
- Twin Buttes Reservoir
- Lake Tyler
- Lake Tyler East

== V ==
- Victor Braunig Lake

== W ==
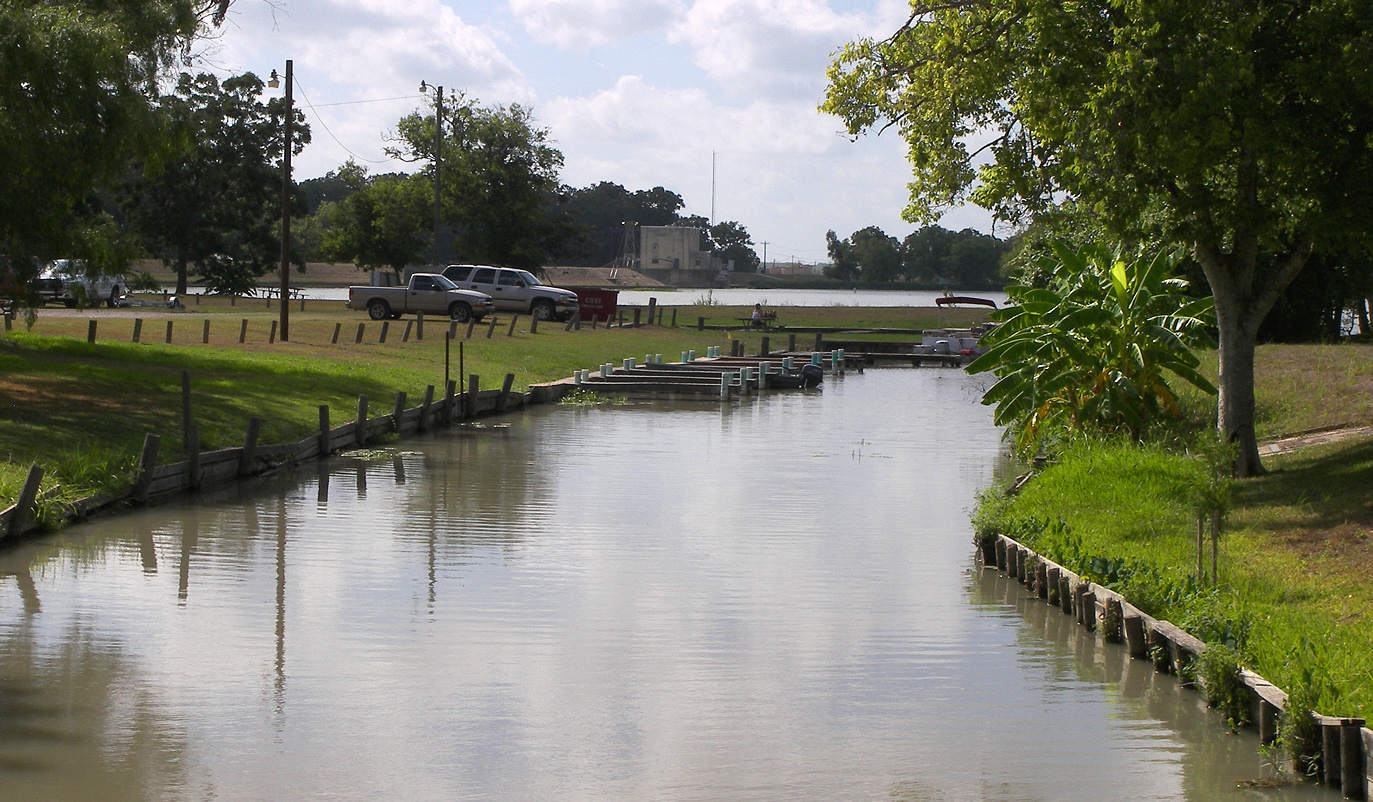
Lake Wood

- Lake Waco
- Lake Walter E. Long
- Lake Waxahachie
- Lake Weatherford
- Lake Welsh
- White River Reservoir
- White Rock Lake
- Lake Whitney
- Lake Wichita
- Lake Winnsboro
- Lake Wood
- Lake Worth
- Wright Patman Lake

== See also ==
- List of lakes in Oklahoma
- List of lakes in Louisiana
- List of geographical regions in Texas
