= Big Lake =

Big Lake may refer to:

== Communities ==
Canada

- Big Lake, Edmonton, a neighbourhood in Alberta, Canada
- Big Lake, Nova Scotia
- Big Lakes County, a municipal district in Alberta, Canada

United States

- Big Lake, Alaska
- Big Lake, Indiana
- Big Lake, Minnesota
- Big Lake, Carlton County, Minnesota
- Big Lake Township, Sherburne County, Minnesota
- Big Lake, Missouri
- Big Lake, Texas
- Big Lake, Washington

== Lakes ==
Canada

- Big Lake (Alberta)

New Zealand

- The Big Lake (New Zealand) in Northland Region

Poland

- Big Lake (Poland), a ribbon lake in the Pomeranian Voivodeship

United States

- Big Lake (Arizona)
- Big Lake (Arkansas)
  - Big Lake in Clay County, Arkansas
  - Big Lake in Crittenden County, Arkansas
  - Big Lake in Drew County, Arkansas
  - Big Lake in Garland County, Arkansas
  - Big Lake in Pulaski County, Arkansas
  - Big Lake in St. Francis County, Arkansas
- Big Lake (Iowa)
- Big Lake (Maine)
- Big Lake (Michigan)
  - Big Lake in Allegan County, Michigan
  - Big Lake in Oakland County, Michigan
  - Big Lake in Osceola County, Michigan
- Big Lake (Grant County, Minnesota)
- Big Lake (Minnesota-Wisconsin), part of "Pool 4", above Lock and Dam No. 4 on the Mississippi River
- Big Lake (Missouri)
- Big Lake (Montana)
  - Big Lake in Chouteau County, Montana
  - Big Lake in Missoula County, Montana
  - Big Lake in Stillwater County, Montana
  - Big Lake in Toole County, Montana
- Big Lake (Texas)
- Big Lake (Washington)

== Parks ==
United States

- Big Lake National Wildlife Refuge in Arkansas
- Big Lake State Park in Missouri

== Other ==
- Big Lake (Metro Transit station) in Big Lake, Minnesota
- Big Lake (TV series), Comedy Central television series
