= Murders of Sally McNelly and Shane Stewart =

Unsolved double homicide murder case allegedly connected to a satanic cult

Sally McNelly
- Born: Sally Ann McNelly; March 26, 1970; San Angelo, Texas
- Died: July 4, 1988 (aged 18)
- Cause of death: Homicide
- Body discovered: November 11, 1988
- Mother: Patricia Parks

Shane Stewart
- Born: Shane Paul Stewart; August 5, 1971; San Angelo, Texas
- Died: July 4, 1988 (aged 16)
- Cause of death: Homicide
- Body discovered: November 14, 1988
- Father: Marshall Stewart

Sally Ann McNelly (March 26, 1970 – July 4, 1988) and Shane Paul Stewart (August 5, 1971 – July 4, 1988) were two teenagers who were murdered near Lake Nasworthy in San Angelo, Texas after spending the evening watching a fireworks display on the Fourth of July in 1988. Their murders, which remain unsolved, were attributed to rumors of a Satanic cult in which they both were alleged to be involved.

The case received national attention among the Satanic panic phenomenon of the 1980s, and was profiled in national media as well as on Unsolved Mysteries.

== Background ==
Sally and Shane were both teenagers from San Angelo, who began dating in 1987 while in high school. After a prolonged breakup, they reunited on the evening of July 4, 1988, and made plans to watch the annual fireworks display at Lake Nasworthy. During their relationship, Sally's friends had witnessed her attending parties with occult activities and where black magic was being practiced; they alleged that she and Shane had been involved with a Satanic cult. In March 1988, Sally and Shane turned a gun over to local police, claiming that they had been given it by a member of the cult and told it had been used in a murder-robbery. Police searched its serial number, and discovered it had been reported stolen.

On the evening of July 4, 1988, Sally and Shane were seen alone on the shore of Lake Nasworthy before midnight by a fisherman offshore. On July 7, they both were reported as missing persons.

== Discovery of bodies ==
On November 11, 1988, Sally's remains were found off FM 584, roughly 17 miles south of where they were last seen, near the Twin Buttes Reservoir's South Pool. Three days later, on November 14, Shane's were discovered in the vicinity. According to their autopsies, they had both died from shotgun blasts to the head. The case remains unsolved.

== 2017 developments ==
In June 2017 the Tom Green County Sheriff's Office in San Angelo pulled over a local man, John Cyrus Gilbreath, on suspicion of marijuana possession. A female passenger in his car told them Gilbreath was dealing, and on that basis, they obtained a warrant to search his house.

Among the items they found in the house were what they described as writings, audio tapes and "biological material" that they said may be connected to the McNelly and Stewart homicides. They announced Gilbreath is now considered a person of interest in that case. However, as of October 2025, the case remains unsolved.

== See also ==
- Crime in Texas
- List of kidnappings
- List of murdered American children
- List of solved missing person cases: 1950–1999
- List of unsolved murders (1980–1999)
- Satanic ritual abuse
