= Davy Crockett Lake =

Davy Crockett Lake may refer to

- Davy Crockett Lake (Crockett County, Tennessee)
- Davy Crockett Lake (Greene County, Tennessee)
- Davy Crockett Lake (Fannin County, Texas)
