= Chupaderas Creek =

Coordinates: 29°20′21″N 98°16′59″W

- Map Map of Chupaderas Creek

Location
- Country: United States
- State: Texas

Physical characteristics
- Mouth: Calaveras Creek

Chupaderas Creek is a stream in Bexar County, Texas, that starts east of Martinez, Texas, and runs for ten miles to its mouth on Calaveras Creek.

In the mid-19th century, William Budd Jaques (1799–1870), friend of Stephen F. Austin, acquired a large tract of land along Chupaderas Creek and developed the property into one of the most significant hog ranching operations east of San Antonio during that period. However, the creek's lower reaches became inundated with the completion of Calaveras Lake Dam in 1969, and the former site of Jaques Rancho is now submerged beneath Calaveras Lake.

Chupaderas means pacifiers in Spanish.

== See also ==
- List of rivers of Texas
