= Lake Tyler East =

Reservoir in Texas

Coordinates: 32.24°N 95.12°W

Lake Tyler East is a reservoir on Mud Creek in the Neches River Basin of Smith County, Texas. It is neighbored by Whitehouse, Texas (population of 8,257) that is encompassed by Tyler, Texas (population of 105,995) which resides within the South Central Plains ecoregion.

== Hydrology ==
Lake Tyler East reservoir was created by the impoundment of Mud Creek, its in-flow tributary, in 1966. Mud Creek is the headwaters of Angelina River which is a tributary of the Neches River that flows for 416 miles through east Texas. Caney Creek is the only out-flow tributary of Lake Tyler East, although Lake Tyler as a whole comprises Lake Tyler West and Lake Tyler East, which were connected via a canal on May 29, 1968.

Lake Tyler East has a surface area of 2,276 acres, an average depth of 16.5 feet, and a watershed area of 62 square miles. The combination of Lake Tyler West and Lake Tyler East has a mean water level of 372.27 feet above sea level (approximately 81% full), surface area of 4,131 acres, and an elevation of 375.38 feet above sea level as of 2022. The storage capacity, as of November 13, 2022, is 63,592 acre-feet with a maximum capacity of 72,073 acre-feet. The reservoir storage has been relatively steady since 2014 with no extreme drought or flooding events.

It is owned and operated by the City of Tyler.

== Ecoregion ==
Lake Tyler East resides within the Tertiary Uplands subdivision of the South Central Plains ecoregion. The Tertiary Uplands ecoregion is defined by Ultisol and Alfisol sediments, with dissected plains and some low, rolling hills. It is predominantly oak/hickory/pine forests with plant species like post oak, white oak, southern red oak, shortleaf pine, loblolly pine, sweetgum, etc. The understory vegetation includes species such as sumac, American beautyberry, hawthorns, and mid/tall grasses. This region has an annual precipitation of 46 inches and mean air temperature of 44.5 degrees Fahrenheit in January and 82.5 degrees Fahrenheit in July.

== Flora ==
The littoral zone consists of substantial native emergent vegetation, predominantly maidencane.

=== Invasive species ===
Hydrilla, a submerged aquatic plant, is invasive to North America that was located and identified in Lake Tyler East. Tyler Waste Utilities revised a management plan in 2008 and begin littoral treatments in 2007, treatments were administered annually until 2011.

== Uses ==
=== Water supply ===
The construction of Mud Creek Dam began on February 11, 1966, and was completed in January 1967. However, the deliberate impoundment of Mud Creek, a tributary of Angelina River, occurred in November 1966. Mud Creek Dam is classified as earth-fill embankment with a soil foundation. It has a length of 4390 feet and a height of 57 feet. The dam has a maximum storage capacity of 85,010 acre-feet, normal storage capacity of 43,000 acre-feet, and a surface area of 3,584 acres. The uncontrolled spillway is classified as concrete weir and has a length of 300 feet, crest elevation of 375.38 feet above sea level, and drainage area of 62 square miles. It also has a maximum drainage capacity of 31,000 cubic feet per second.

Mud Creek Dam is owned and operated by the local government of the City of Tyler for the continued use as a water supply. However, it is regulated by the state agency Texas Commission on Environmental Quality.

== Recreation ==
=== Parks ===
There are three public parks with access to Lake Tyler East. Old Omen Road Ramp, West is open year-round and provides parking, access to two boat ramps, restrooms, picnic areas, and camping areas. Highway 64 Ramp is open year-round and provides parking, access to a concrete boat ramp, picnic areas, and camping areas. These two facilities are operated by the City of Tyler Water Utility.

Old Omen Road Ramp, East is open year-round and provides parking and access to one boat ramp. This facility is operated by Smith County.

=== Sports fishing ===
Sports fishing is one of the main recreation activities of Lake Tyler East. The reservoir contains sports fish species, such as Channel catfish, White Bass, Largemouth Bass (increased abundance), White Crappie, and Black Crappie. These species are supported by prey fish, such as Bluegill (abundant), sunfishes, and Threadfin.

== History ==
=== Dam ===
Mud Creek Dam was designed by Wisenbaker Fix and Associates.
