= North Lake =

North Lake or North Lakes may refer to:

== Communities ==
=== Australia ===
- North Lake, Western Australia, a suburb and a namesake lake within the area
- North Lakes, Queensland, an outer suburb north of Brisbane

=== Canada ===
- North Lake Parish, New Brunswick
- North Lake, Prince Edward Island

=== United States ===
- North Lake, Pasadena, California, in Los Angeles County
- North Lake, Wisconsin, in Waukesha County

== Lakes ==
- North Lake (Crittenden County, Arkansas), Crittenden County, Arkansas
- North Lake (Fulton County, Arkansas), Fulton County, Arkansas
- North Lake (California), Inyo County, California
- North Lake (Goodhue County, Minnesota), Goodhue County, Minnesota
- North Lake (Martin County, Minnesota), Martin County, Minnesota
- North Lake (New York)
- North Lake (Dallas), Texas
- North Lake (Red River County, Texas) (also called Country Club Lake)
- North Lake (Cochrane District), Cochrane District, Ontario
- North Lake (Haliburton County), Haliburton County, Ontario
- North Lake (Hastings County), Hastings County, Ontario
- North Lake (Street Township, Sudbury District), Sudbury District, Ontario
- North Lake (Botha Township, Sudbury District), Sudbury District, Ontario
- North Lake (Parry Sound District), Parry Sound District, Ontario
- North Lake (Thunder Bay District), Thunder Bay District, Ontario
- North Lake (Lennox and Addington County), Lennox and Addington County, Ontario
- North Lake (Nova Scotia), in Antigonish County
- North Lake (Western Australia)

== Education ==
- North Lake Senior Campus, in Kardinya, Western Australia
- North Lake College, in Texas
- North Lake School, in Oregon

== Rail transport ==
- North Lake Station, a former railway station in Ontario
- North Lake College (DART station), a light rail station in Irving, Texas
- North Lake Line, a former local rail line in Pasadena, California

== See also ==
- Northlake (disambiguation)
- Northlakes, North Carolina, a census-designated place (CDP) in Caldwell County
- North–South Lake, in New York state
