= Lyndon B. Johnson National Grassland =

Protected area in north Texas

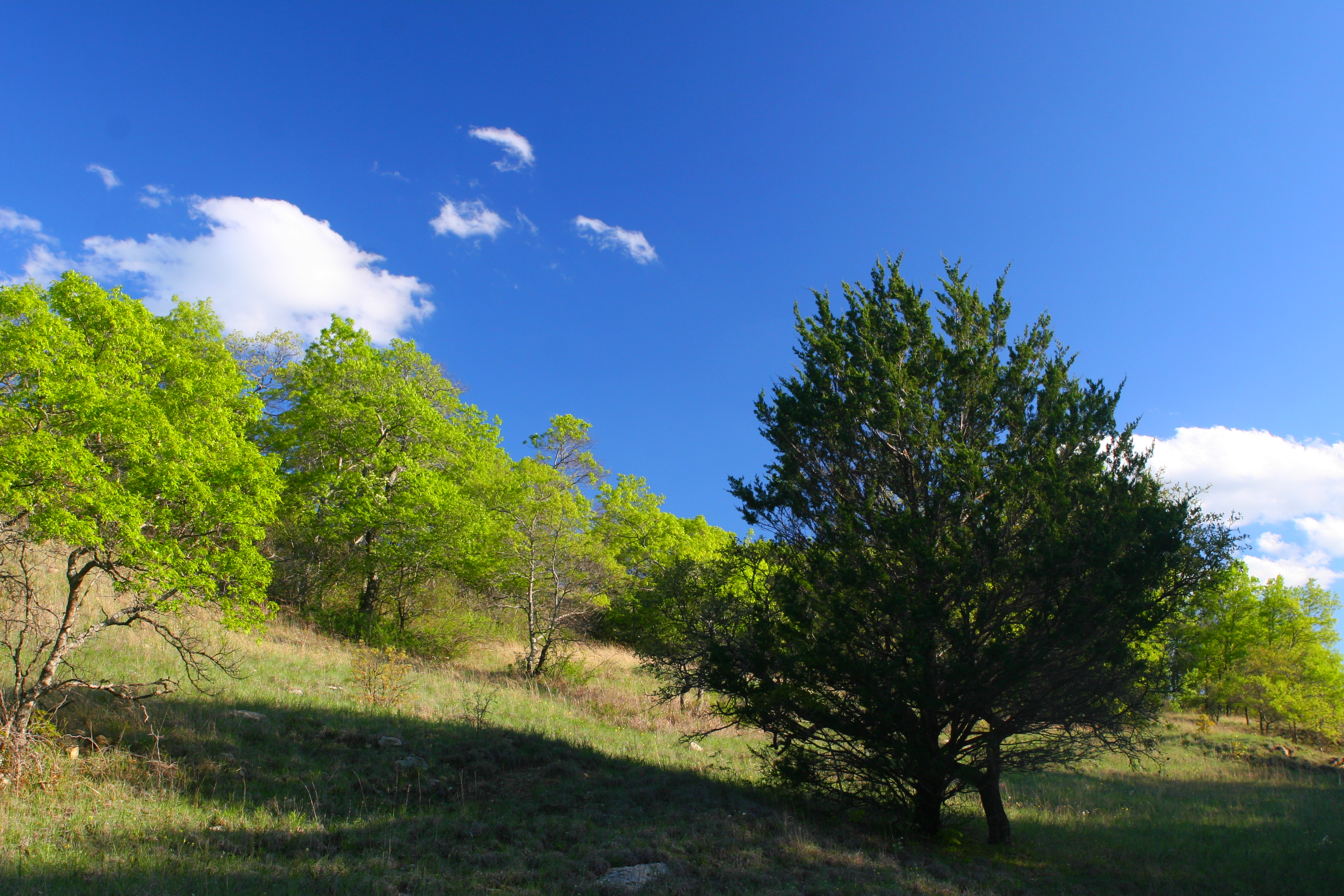
- LBJ National Grassland

- Location within the United States
- Location: Wise and Montague counties, Texas, United States
- Nearest city: Decatur
- Coordinates: 33°20′43″N 97°35′23″W
- Area: 20,309 acres (82.19 km^{2})
- Governing body: U.S. Forest Service
- Website: Caddo–LBJ National Grasslands

Lyndon B. Johnson (LBJ) National Grassland is a national grassland located in the Great Plains of the northern part of the U.S. state of Texas near Decatur, and within an hour's drive from Fort Worth. It is primarily used for recreation, such as hiking, camping, horseback riding, fishing, and hunting. It is also used as grazing land for cattle and other livestock.

Camping and other activities are free of charge. Visitors may camp in virtually any area of the park. Both pull-through and hike-in campsites are available. Some areas require a small fee for use, but these are few and clearly marked.

Named after former U.S. president Lyndon B. Johnson, the park is located primarily in the northern part of Wise County, but a small portion extends northward into southern Montague County. It has a land area of 20,309 acres (8,219 ha). The grassland is administered together with all four national forests and two national grasslands located entirely in Texas, from common offices in Lufkin, Texas. The units include Angelina, Davy Crockett, Sabine, and Sam Houston National Forests, plus Caddo National Grassland and Lyndon B. Johnson. Local ranger district offices are located in Decatur.

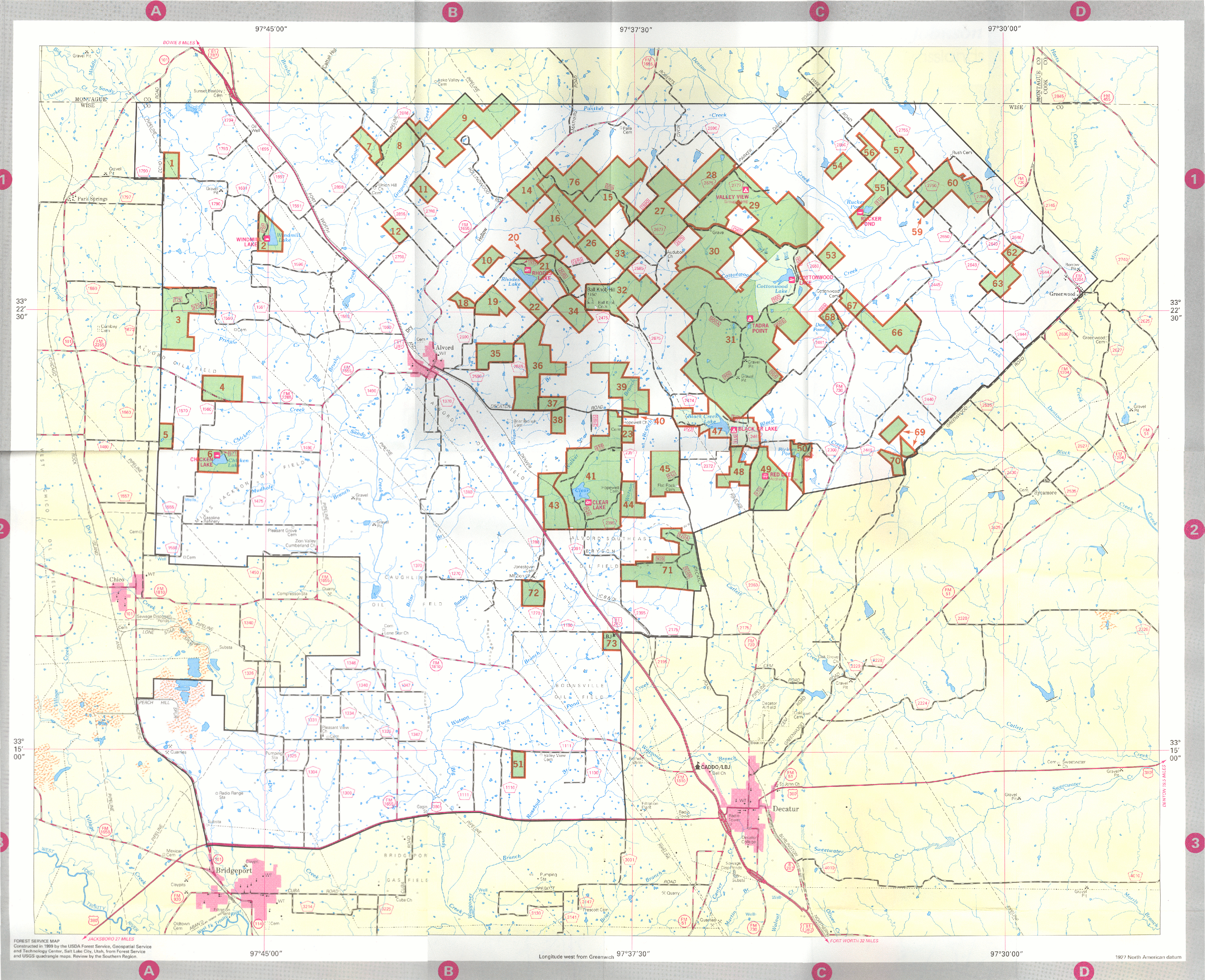
Map of LBJ Grasslands

== See also ==
- List of facilities named after Lyndon Johnson
- Rucker Pond
