= Buffalo Creek (Texas) =

Coordinates: 32°16′01″N 97°24′30″W

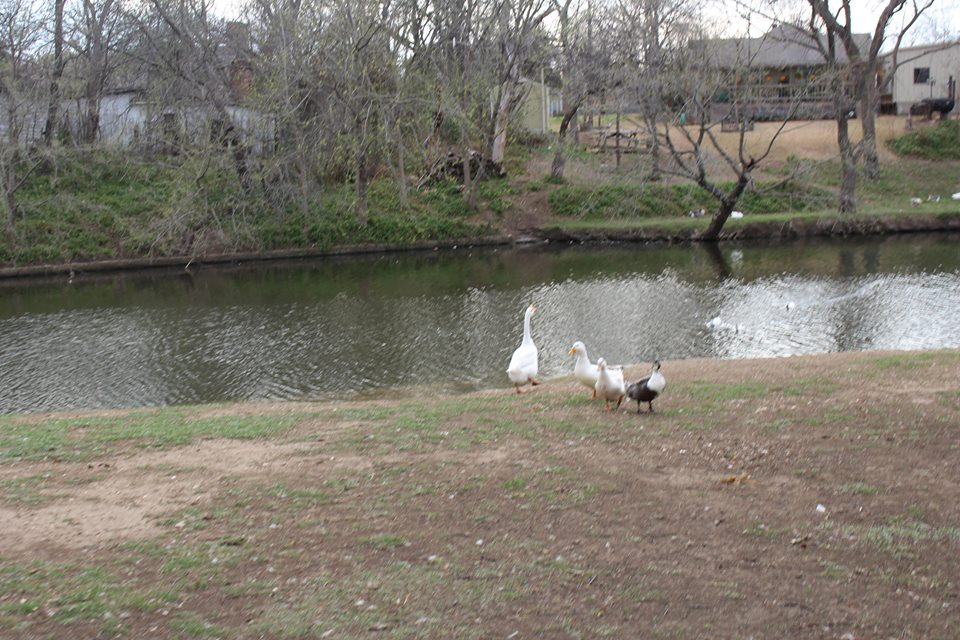
- Buffalo Creek as it flows through Hulen Park, Cleburne

Location
- Country: United States

Buffalo Creek is a creek in Johnson County, Texas. The creek flows primarily through the city of Cleburne where two smaller streams meet. The East Buffalo Creek originates near the town of Keene, flowing south-west into Cleburne. The West Buffalo Creek originates near the town of Joshua. The consolidated river then flows into the Nolan River to the south of Cleburne.
