= List of memorials to Lyndon B. Johnson =

This is a list of memorials to Lyndon B. Johnson, the 36th president of the United States.

== Buildings ==
- Lyndon B. Johnson Student Center, a complex including teaching theaters, shops, a student pool hall, and office space located at the Texas State University in San Marcos, Texas; President Johnson's college alma mater.
- Lyndon B. Johnson Tropical Medical Center, a hospital in American Samoa
- Lyndon B. Johnson General Hospital, part of Harris Health System in Houston, Texas
- Lyndon B. Johnson Space Center in Houston, Texas
- Lyndon Baines Johnson Department of Education Building, in Washington, D.C.
- Lyndon Baines Johnson Library and Museum, presidential museum in Austin, Texas

== Military vessels ==
- USS Lyndon B. Johnson (DDG-1002)

== Parks and topographical features ==
- Lyndon B. Johnson National Historical Park, Johnson City, Texas
- Lyndon B. Johnson State Park and Historic Site, Stonewall, Texas
- Lake Lyndon B. Johnson, a lake in Texas
- Lyndon B. Johnson National Grassland, in Texas
- Lyndon Baines Johnson Memorial Grove on the Potomac, in Washington, D.C.
- FELDA L.B. Johnson, a village settlement in Negeri Sembilan, Malaysia.

== Roads ==
- Lyndon B. Johnson Freeway (Interstate 635), a freeway in Dallas, Texas

== Schools ==
- Lyndon B. Johnson Elementary School in Jackson, Kentucky
- Lyndon B. Johnson High School (Austin, Texas)
- Lyndon B. Johnson High School (Johnson City, Texas)
- Lyndon B. Johnson High School (Laredo, Texas)
- Lyndon B. Johnson Middle School in Melbourne, Florida
- Lyndon B. Johnson School of Public Affairs, a public affairs graduate school at the University of Texas at Austin
- Johnson Elementary in Bryan, Texas

== Public monuments ==
- Lyndon B. Johnson Monument - statue monument located in Little Tranquility Park in Houston.

== Clubs and Organizations ==
- The K5LBJ Amateur Radio Club is operated within LASA High School and is named after LBJ High School in Austin, Texas from its founding when LASA and LBJ were one high school.

== See also ==
- Presidential memorials in the United States
