= Nolan River =

Location
- Country: United States

Physical characteristics
- Source
  - location: Texas
- Mouth
  - coordinates: 32.08812°N 97.46819°W
- Length: 27 mi (43 km)

Nolan River is a river in north Central Texas, running through Johnson and Hill Counties, and is part of the Brazos River drainage basin. The Nolan's headwaters are in farmland in northwest Johnson County. The river runs generally parallel to, and about 10 miles (16 km) east of, the Brazos. The Nolan flows in a southeasterly direction from its headwaters for about 27 miles (43 km) to its confluence with the Brazos River in the headwaters of Lake Whitney in Hill County, south of the town of Blum, Texas.

In 1961, the Nolan River was dammed at Highway 67, west of the city of Cleburne, submerging the site of Wardville, the original county seat of Johnson County. The reservoir, named Lake Pat Cleburne, is the municipal water source for the city of Cleburne and serves as a recreational body for the county. The Nolan, north of the dam, is a narrow, tree-lined, slow-moving, rather shallow stream primarily flowing through private farmland, and is popular with anglers. Below the lake, the river takes on a different character, as it flows through limestone bluffs with a hard-packed clay and gravel river bottom, and the banks are covered with many species of large trees. The river, below the dam, flows with a considerable volume of water, 250 to 300 cubic feet per second (7.1 to 8.5 m^{3}/s). The stream contains significant fish populations and is home to the great blue heron and snowy egret. The river bends sharply in some places and has very limited straight length. The lower part of the Nolan River is popular for canoeing and kayaking, and rapids in some areas create very fast-moving water for challenging recreational activities. Flow can reach as much as 350 cubic feet per second (9.9 m^{3}/s).

The Nolan River has one primary tributary, Buffalo Creek, which has its confluence with the Nolan less than a mile southeast of Lake Pat Cleburne.

== Philip Nolan ==
Four miles south of Rio Vista on Highway 174 is a marker erected to the memory of Philip Nolan (1771–1801). This is on the Hill County side, and a small cemetery is west-northwest in the timber, near the river. The river is named after Philip Nolan, who was known to have been a horse trader to the U.S. Army in 1791. Nolan County, Texas also is named for him.

== See also ==
- List of rivers of Texas
