= Northlake =

Northlake may refer to:

- Northlake, Georgia, an unincorporated community in DeKalb County
- Northlake, Illinois, a city in Cook County
- Northlake, South Carolina, a census-designated place (CDP) in Anderson County
- Northlake, Texas, a town in Denton County
- Northlake, Seattle, a neighborhood

== See also ==
- North Lake (disambiguation)
- Northlakes, North Carolina, a census-designated place (CDP) in Caldwell County
