= Lake Pat Cleburne =

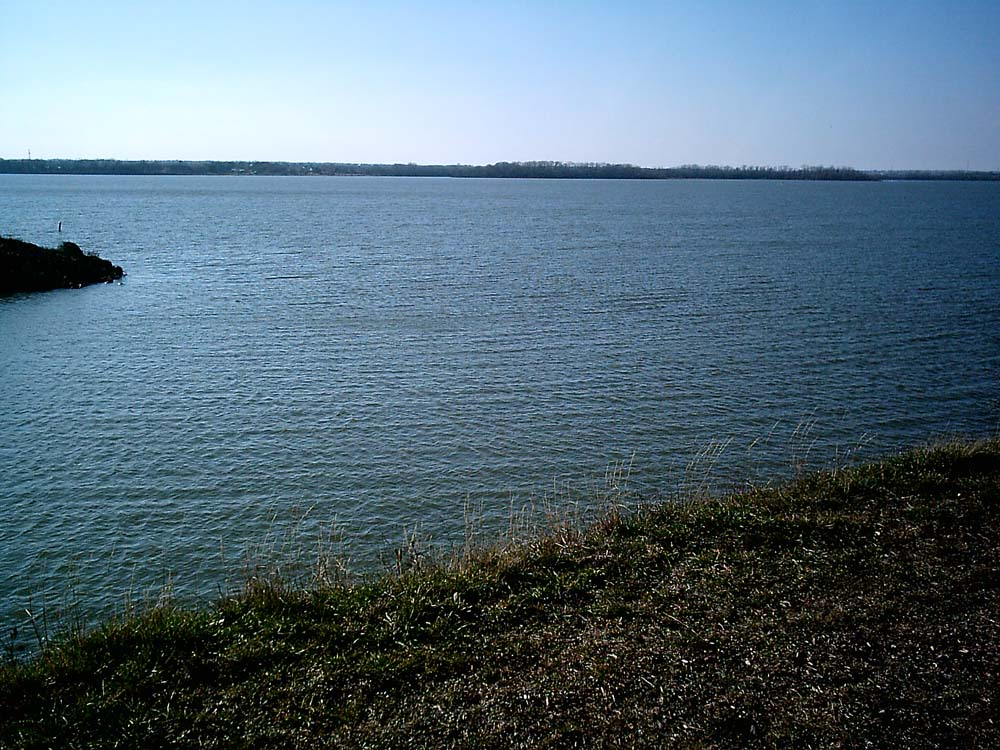

- Location within Texas Location within the United States
- Location: Cleburne, Johnson County, Texas
- Coordinates: 32°17.3′N 97°25.0′W
- Type: Reservoir
- Primary inflows: Nolan River
- Primary outflows: Nolan River
- Basin countries: United States
- Surface area: 1,558 acres (631 ha)
- Max. depth: 64 ft (20 m)
- Water volume: 25,600 acre⋅ft (31,600,000 m^{3})
- Surface elevation: 733.5 ft (223.6 m)

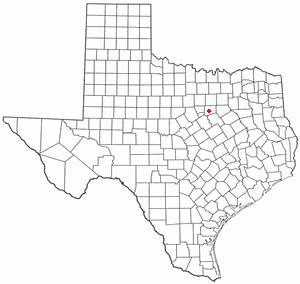
Location of Lake Pat Cleburne, Texas

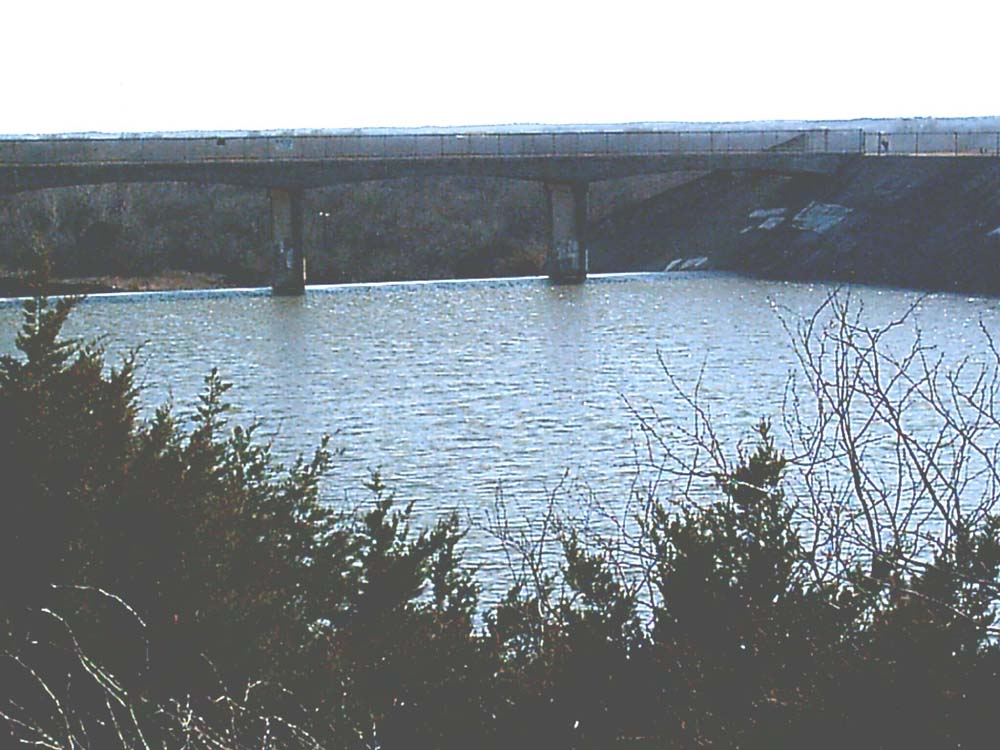
Lake Pat Cleburne Dam

Lake Pat Cleburne is the municipal water reservoir for the city of Cleburne, Texas, as well as a recreational lake for residents. Lake Pat Cleburne is owned and operated by the City of Cleburne. It was built as the city's water supply and was impounded in 1964. U.S. Highway 67 crosses over the north end of the lake.

== Description ==
Lake Pat Cleburne was formed by damming the Nolan River, which continues below the lake's dam. The water's normal clarity is murky or stained due to sediment. The maximum depth of the lake is 33 feet, with a storage capacity of 26,008 acre-feet. The length of the shoreline is 15.3 miles at 733.5 feet above sea level. Originally named the Cleburne Reservoir, it was later renamed to specifically reference Confederate general Patrick Cleburne.

== Fish Populations ==
This lake is the habitat of many sport fish, including Blue Catfish, Channel Catfish, Flathead Catfish, Largemouth Bass, White Bass, White Crappie, and Black Crappie. It also maintains a population of prey species including Gizzard Shad, Threadfin Shad, Bluegill, Longear Sunfish, and Redear Sunfish. In 2023, all catfish and crappie were had the highest on record catch rates, while bass and prey fish were all found below historical averages.

== Aquatic Vegetation ==
Lake Pat Cleburne is the habitat of Water willow, cattail, bulrush, and buttonbush.

== Recreational Areas ==
Cleburne State Park is approximately 10 miles (16 km) away from Lake Pat Cleburne.
