= Lake Graham (Texas) =

Reservoir in Young County, Texas, United States

- Location within Texas Location within the United States
- Interactive map of Lake Graham
- Location: Young County, Texas
- Coordinates: 33°08′26.5″N 98°37′13.3″W
- Type: Reservoir
- Managing agency: City of Graham
- First flooded: 1929
- Surface area: 2,444 acres (989 ha)
- Max. depth: 45 feet (14 m)
- Surface elevation: 1,043 feet (318 m)
- Settlements: Graham, Texas
- References: U.S. Geological Survey Geographic Names Information System: Lake Graham

Lake Graham is a reservoir ocated north of Graham, Texas. The reservoir is west of U.S. Route 380.

The lake is connected to Lake Eddleman by a small creek.
