= Marine Creek Reservoir =

Lake in Fort Worth, Texas, USA

- Interactive map of Marine Creek Reservoir
- Location: Fort Worth, Texas
- Coordinates: 32°49′40.5″N 97°23′48.9″W
- Built: 1958
- Surface area: .85 square kilometres (0.33 sq mi)
- Max. depth: 12 metres (39 ft)

Marine Creek Reservoir is a lake located in north-east of Fort Worth Texas. The reservoir is situated by Interstate 820, west of Fort Worth Meacham International Airport.

== Marine Creek ==
Marine Creek flows south from the reservoir, passing directly through the Fort Worth Stockyards before meeting the West Fork of the Trinity River.
