= North Lake (Red River County, Texas) =

- Country Club Lake
- Location within Texas
- Location: Red River County, Texas
- Coordinates: 33°40′N 95°03′W
- Type: reservoir
- Surface elevation: 430 feet (130 m)

North Lake (also Country Club Lake) is a reservoir 4 miles (6.4 km) north of Clarksville, Texas (USA) in Red River County. Its spillway has an elevation 430 feet (130 m). It lies in a heavily wooded area with hardwoods and pines.
