= Big Lake (Maine) =

- Location within Maine Location within the United States
- Location: Washington County, Maine, United States
- Coordinates: 45°09′44″N 67°41′47″W
- Lake type: Natural freshwater lake
- Basin countries: United States
- Max. length: 7.93 mi (12.76 km)
- Max. width: 5.36 mi (8.63 km)
- Surface area: 10,444 acres (4,227 ha)
- Average depth: 12 ft (3.7 m)
- Max. depth: 70 ft (21 m)
- Surface elevation: 200 ft (61 m)
- Islands: 28

Big Lake is a body of water in Washington County, Maine. Known for smallmouth bass, Big Lake is the second largest lake in Washington County and one of the largest lakes in Maine. The lake is located in and around the Grand Lake Stream, near the border with New Brunswick. Covering 10,444 acres (4,227 ha), Big Lake has a maximum depth of 70 feet (21 m). There are 28 islands on the lake. Big Lake constitutes part of the west branch of the Saint Croix River. Big Lake is a well-known location for anglers and other fresh water fishermen.
