= Lake Crook =

Lake in Texas, United States

- Location within Texas Location within the United States
- Interactive map of Lake Crook
- Location: Lamar County, Texas
- Coordinates: 33°43′18.2″N 95°34′55.4″W
- Type: Lake
- Primary inflows: Pine Creek
- Basin countries: United States
- Managing agency: City of Paris
- Built: 1923
- Surface area: 1,060 acres (430 ha)
- Max. depth: 24 feet (7.3 m)
- Surface elevation: 476 feet (145 m)
- Settlements: Paris, Texas
- References: U.S. Geological Survey Geographic Names Information System: Lake Crook

Lake Crook is a lake located north of Paris, Texas. The reservoir is situated west of U.S. Route 271.

The lake was constructed in 1923.

== Lake Crook Park ==
Lake Crook Park is located on the eastern shore of the lake, which features a playground, pavilions and fishing spots.
