= Mud Creek (Ramsey Creek tributary) =

Stream in the American state of Missouri

Coordinates: 39.2975467°N 90.9223544°W

Mud Creek is a stream in Pike County in the U.S. state of Missouri. It is a tributary of Ramsey Creek.

Mud Creek was so named on account of the muddy character of its water.

== See also ==
- List of rivers of Missouri
