= Lake El Paso =

- Mountain Shadow Lake
- Location within Texas
- Location: El Paso County, Texas
- Coordinates: 31.6839°N 106.2037°W
- Type: dry lake, artificial lake

Lake El Paso, formerly known as Mountain Shadow Lake, is a privately owned artificial lake and former recreation park east of Horizon City, Texas. The lake is 9 miles north of the Interstate 10 off Horizon Boulevard. At 106 acres (43 ha), it was twice the size of Ascarate Lake. Once an entertainment venue for the city of El Paso, the land is now closed to the public due to the inherent dangers of an empty lake and the desert environment.

== History ==
Mountain Shadow Lake was first built in the 1980s. Starting in 1986, Mountain Shadow Lakes was the site of the annual El Paso Balloon Fiesta hosted by KLAQ-FM. In 1995, the lake was closed to visitors and was put up for sale. In 1998, Lake El Paso Inc. formed to rebuild the property, which was subsequently renamed. Improvements made to the site included restoring the lake by restarting water wells and planting an additional 2,500+ trees at the park to help prevent sunburn.

Lake El Paso was reopened to the public in 2001. By then, there were four main bulidings along the beach to allow swimmers to cool down after swimming.

According to the El Paso Times in 2003, some local residents had reported seeing Bigfoot-type creatures drinking water near Lake El Paso at night, while others dismissed the claims. Other events held at Lake El Paso over the years included tractor pulls and sand drag racing.

As of 2015, a group called The American Patriots at Shadow Lake announced their intent to purchase the property and develop it as a retreat for wounded military veterans.
