= Blue Wing Lake =

Lake in Texas, United States

- Location within Texas Location within the United States
- Interactive map of Blue Wing Lake
- Location: San Antonio, Texas
- Coordinates: 29°16′00.0″N 98°26′00.0″W
- Type: Artificial/Reservoir
- Part of: San Antonio River
- Basin countries: United States
- Managing agency: Blue Wing Club
- Built: 1900
- Surface area: 67 acres (0.27 km^{2})
- Water volume: 1,000–1,600 acre-foot (330,000,000–520,000,000 US gal)
- References: US Geological Survey

Blue Wing Lake is a lake located in the south of San Antonio, Texas. The lake is a tributary of the San Antonio River, west of Elmendorf. The lake is artificial, made in 1900, and is used for irrigation.

The lake has an area of 67 acres (0.27 km^{2}) and has a capacity of 1,600 acre-foot (520,000,000 US gal).
