= Lake Eastland =

Lake in Texas

- Interactive map of Lake Eastland
- Coordinates: 32°25′03″N 98°50′23″W

Lake Eastland, also known as Lake Brelsford, is a reservoir located in Eastland, Texas. The lake is situated north of Eastland, and south of Morton Valley.
