= Cedar Lake (Brazoria County, Texas) =

Lake in Texas, US

Coordinates: 29°11′33″N 95°04′59″W

Cedar Lake is a lake in Brazoria County, Texas, United States. It is shaped like a teardrop, and is under one mile in diameter. It is fed by Cedar Lake Creek and the San Bernard River, draining into the Gulf of Mexico. In 1949, the completed Gulf Intracoastal Waterway became another tributary.
