= Lake Boehmer =

- Location within Texas Location within the United States
- Location: Pecos County, Texas
- Coordinates: 31.2237°N 102.72878°W
- Type: reservoir
- Etymology: named after former landowner Bernard Boehmer

Lake Boehmer is an artificial lake in Pecos County, Texas.

== Area and water composition ==
The lake has been slowly growing since 2003. It covers an area of more than sixty acres and the water is three times as salty as seawater. The casing in the well is corroded and the well hit a salt layer. The sulfate level is twenty-five times the legal limit for drinking water.

== Origins ==
In the 1940s or 1950s, oil wells were drilled near Imperial, Texas. None of them produced oil, but water and the oil companies deeded them to landowners who used them to irrigate farms, but they have fallen into disuse.

== Name and ownership ==
The lake is named after former landowner Bernard Boehmer. The Texas Department of Licensing and Regulation have tried to contact him via a registered letter to an address in Missouri, but it is not known if it reached him or if he replied. The ownership of the lake wells is unclear. There is also controversy as to where responsibility lies for cleanup and remediation.
