= Big Lake (Iowa) =

- Location within Iowa Location within the United States

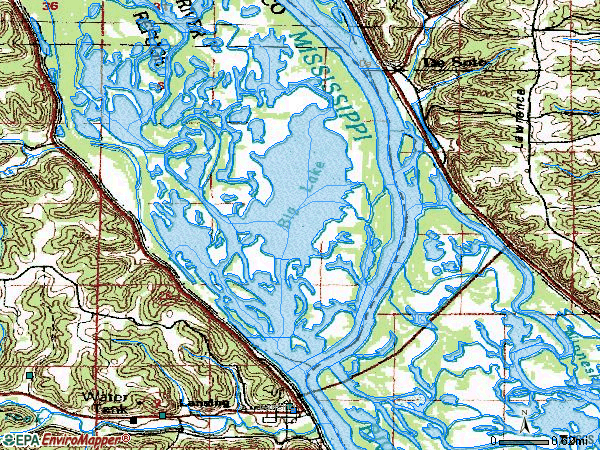
- (United States Environmental Protection Agency)
- Location: Allamakee County, Iowa
- Coordinates: 43°23′57″N 91°13′04″W
- Type: Reservoir
- Primary inflows: Upper Mississippi River
- Primary outflows: Upper Mississippi River
- Basin countries: United States
- Surface elevation: 620 ft (189 m)

Big Lake is an open body of water surrounded by marshy islands in Navigation Pool 9 of the Upper Mississippi River. It lies where the Iowa, Minnesota and Wisconsin borders come together, just north of Lansing, Iowa. It is part of the Upper Mississippi River National Wildlife and Fish Refuge.

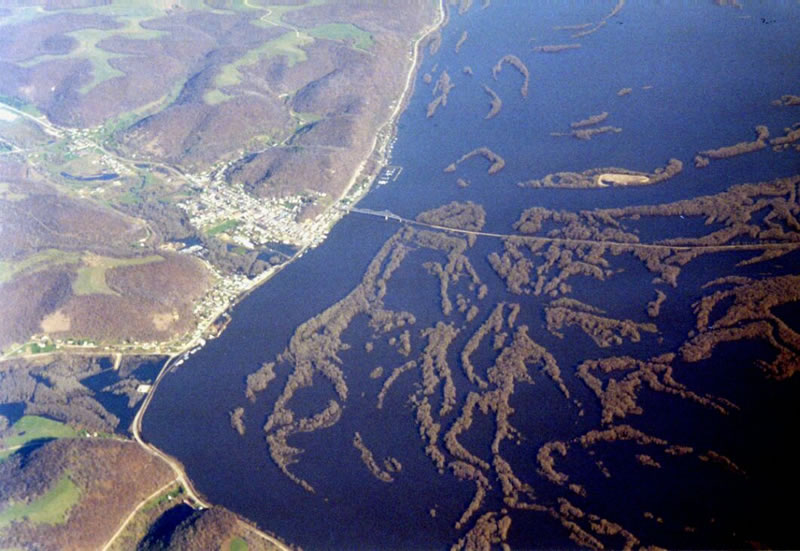
Aerial view looking north, January 14, 2001, with River at floodstage; the Black Hawk Bridge is visible; Big Lake is the open area in the upper part, click to enlarge (USGS, Upper Midwest Environmental Sciences Center)

The Army Corps of Engineers maintains the lake's integrity as a fish habitat.

== Overview ==
The lake is connected to Gilbert's Pond through a shallow creek that is bridged by Big Lake Road. The lake is stocked with rainbow trout twice a year, in October and February. There is a fishing dock on the lake, and in the surrounding park, there is a playground, walking trails, and a picnic shelter. In addition the park contains one of 5 Iowan Art-in-the-Park sculptures. The park also serves as a trailhead for the Iowa Riverfront Trail.

== Sources ==
- Army Corps of Engineers (retrieved 2 April 2007)
