= Coffee Mill Lake =

Reservoir in Fannin County, Texas, United States

- Location of Coffee Mill Lake in Texas
- Location: Fannin County, Texas, United States
- Coordinates: 33°43′50.2″N 95°59′06.3″W
- Surface elevation: 151 metres (495 ft)

Coffee Mill Lake is a lake located north of Honey Grove and Bonham, in Fannin County, Texas. The reservoir is situated south of the Red River on the Oklahoma border.

The Lake has also been referred to as Coffeemill Reservoir and Lake Coffee Mill.
