= Big Lake (Grant County, Minnesota) =

Lake in the state of Minnesota, United States

- Location within Minnesota
- Location: Grant County, Minnesota
- Coordinates: 45°49′12″N 96°6′48″W
- Type: Lake
- Surface elevation: 1,076 feet (328 m)

Big Lake is a lake in Grant County, in the U.S. state of Minnesota.

Big Lake was named for its relatively large size.

== See also ==
- List of lakes in Minnesota
