= Lake Eddleman =

Reservoir in Texas, United States

- Location within Texas Location within the United States
- Interactive map of Lake Eddleman
- Location: Young County, Texas
- Coordinates: 33°08′33.5″N 98°36′14.6″W
- Type: Reservoir
- Primary inflows: Flint Creek
- Primary outflows: Lake Graham
- Basin countries: United States
- Managing agency: City of Graham
- First flooded: 1929
- Surface area: 2,444 acres (989 ha)
- Max. depth: 45 feet (14 m)
- Surface elevation: 1,076 feet (328 m)
- Settlements: Graham, Texas
- References: U.S. Geological Survey Geographic Names Information System: Lake Eddleman

Lake Eddleman is a reservoir located north of Graham, Texas. The reservoir is west of U.S. Route 380.

The lake is connected to Lake Graham by a small creek.
