= Lake Nacogdoches =

Reservoir in Texas, United States

Lake Nacogdoches is a reservoir located about 10 miles west of the city of Nacogdoches, Texas, above Loco Bayou dam. Loco Bayou is a tributary of the Angelina River, part of the Neches River basin.

== History ==
The Loco Bayou, which created Lake Nacogdoches, was constructed and completed by Freese & Nichols from the mid-1970s to 1977. It is an earthen dam constructed for municipal water supply, yet its primary purpose was recreational. Currently, the Lake is operated and owned by the City of Nacogdoches.

Debris from the Space Shuttle Columbia, which had disintegrated during re-entry in 2003, was found in the lake during a 2011 drought.

== Hydrology ==
The lake was impounded in 1976, has a surface area of 2,212 acres, and a maximum depth of 40 feet. Currently, the lake quality has a moderately clear clarity value. According to the Texas State Historical Association, the lake's capacity at a normal level is 42,318 acre-feet and a maximum value of 122,000 acre-feet.

== Flora ==
According to the Texas Parks and Wildlife Department, the aquatic flora found in the lake are mainly Hydrilla and the American lotus.

== Fauna ==
According to the Texas Parks and Wildlife Department, the main fish species occupying Nacogdoches Lake are largemouth bass, crappie, and sunfish.

== Uses or purpose ==
Presently, Lake Nacogdoches is used primarily for game fishing.
