= Mud Lake (Texas) =

There are over a dozen lakes named Mud Lake within the U.S. state of Texas.

- Mud Lake, Anderson County, Texas. 31°38′43″N 95°47′03″W
- Mud Lake, Bowie County, Texas. 33°39′38″N 94°39′36″W
- Mud Lake, Calhoun County, Texas. 28°34′11″N 96°36′30″W
- Mud Lake, Chambers County, Texas. 29°51′18″N 94°43′13″W
- Mud Lake, Edwards County, Texas. 30°12′59″N 100°12′42″W
- Mud Lake, Gregg County, Texas. 32°28′07″N 94°49′57″W
- Mud Lake, Hardin County, Texas. 30°20′05″N 94°05′53″W
- Mud Lake, Harris County, Texas. 29°34′09″N 95°04′14″W
- Mud Lake, Henderson County, Texas. 32°15′09″N 96°13′55″W
- Mud Lake, Jefferson County, Texas. 29°34′54″N 94°20′11″W
- Mud Lake, Jefferson County, Texas. 29°42′48″N 93°52′13″W
- Mud Lake, Jefferson County, Texas. 29°46′14″N 93°58′59″W
- Mud Lake, Leon County, Texas. 31°26′41″N 95°42′49″W
- Mud Lake, Liberty County, Texas. 30°17′29″N 94°48′39″W
- Mud Lake, Madison County, Texas. 30°58′27″N 96°14′09″W
- Mud Lake, Red River County, Texas. 33°54′59″N 95°14′26″W
- Mud Lake, Walker County, Texas. 30°51′43″N 95°26′46″W
