= Davy Crockett Lake (Crockett County, Tennessee) =

- Location within Tennessee Location within the United States
- Location: Crockett County, Tennessee, U.S. state
- Coordinates: 35°49′08″N 88°59′11″W
- Basin countries: United States
- Surface area: 87-acre (35.21 ha; 0.14 sq mi)
- Surface elevation: 364 ft (111 m)

Davy Crockett Lake is an 87-acre (35.21 ha; 0.14 sq mi) body of water located on Tennessee State Route 152 in Crockett County in the U.S. state of Tennessee. It was originally named Humboldt Lake. It is a fishing lake home to catfish and largemouth bass.
