= Rucker Pond =

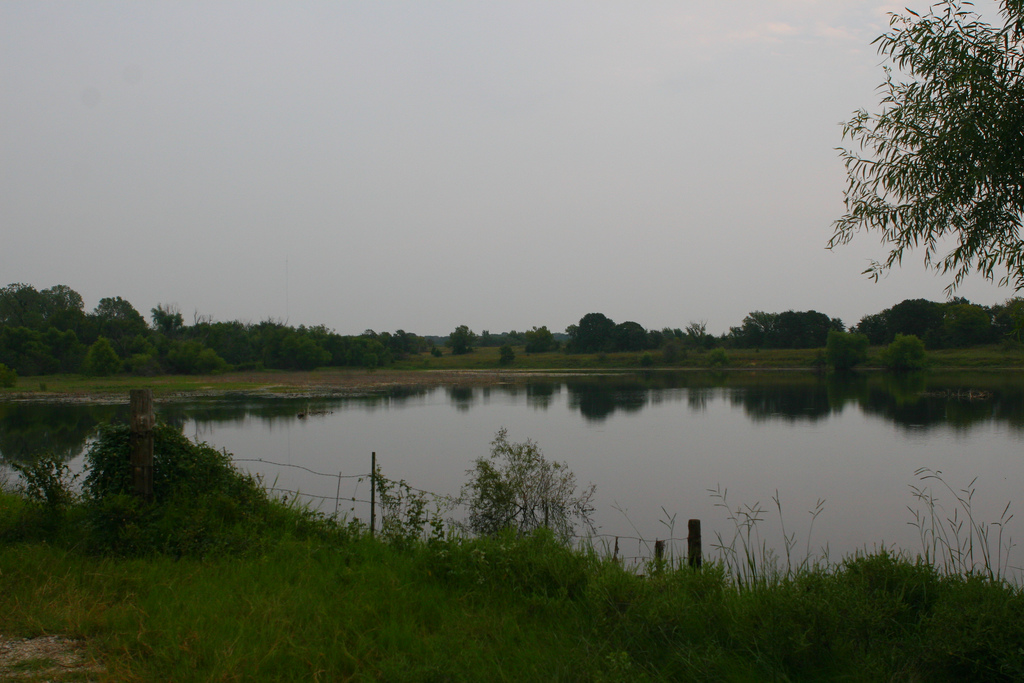

- Location within Texas Location within the United States
- Location: Wise County, Texas
- Coordinates: 33°24′08″N 97°32′48″W
- Type: reservoir
- Basin countries: United States
- Surface elevation: 845 ft (258 m)

Rucker Pond is a reservoir within the LBJ National Grasslands. The pond is located in North Texas in Wise County near Decatur, and is operated by the United States Forest Service. It is off County Road 2650. Among Rucker Pond's fish species are largemouth bass.

Rucker Pond is located within Area 55 of the LBJ National Grasslands (Map grid C1). The pond is accessible via unsealed Forest Service road 916, which intersects Wise County Road 2650.

== Recreation ==
As part of the LBJ Grasslands, Rucker Pond is freely available for recreational use by the public. Activities include fishing, camping, hiking, and hunting. The lake has no boat landing or dock. Reservations are not required for camping, and the area is open year round.

== Access ==
From Decatur, travel North on FM 730. Turn left on County Road 2650. Turn left at the intersection of CR 2650/2750. Turn left onto Forest Service Road 916, and follow the gravel road until it ends.

== See also ==
- Download a high-resolution Forest Service map of the area
- Lyndon B. Johnson National Grassland
