= Palo Pinto Creek Reservoir =

- Lake Palo Pinto
- Location within Texas
- Interactive map of Palo Pinto Creek Reservoir
- Location: Palo Pinto, Texas
- Coordinates: 32°39′08.05″N 98°18′24.3″W
- Type: Reservoir
- Basin countries: United States
- Managing agency: Palo Pinto Co Municipal
- First flooded: 1964
- Surface area: 2,399 acres (971 ha)
- Max. depth: 47 ft (14 m)
- Surface elevation: 866–896 ft (264–273 m)
- References: GNIS

Palo Pinto Creek Reservoir is a lake located south of Palo Pinto, and north-east of Gordon in Palo Pinto County, Texas. The eastern branch of the reservoir is known as Lake Palo Pinto.
