= The Big Lake (New Zealand) =

Lake in New Zealand

- Location within Northland Region
- Location: Northland Region, North Island
- Coordinates: 34.5444909°S 172.8277925°E
- Basin countries: New Zealand

The Big Lake is a private, freshwater lake in the Northland Region of New Zealand.

== See also ==
- List of lakes in New Zealand
