= Lake Whitney (Texas) =

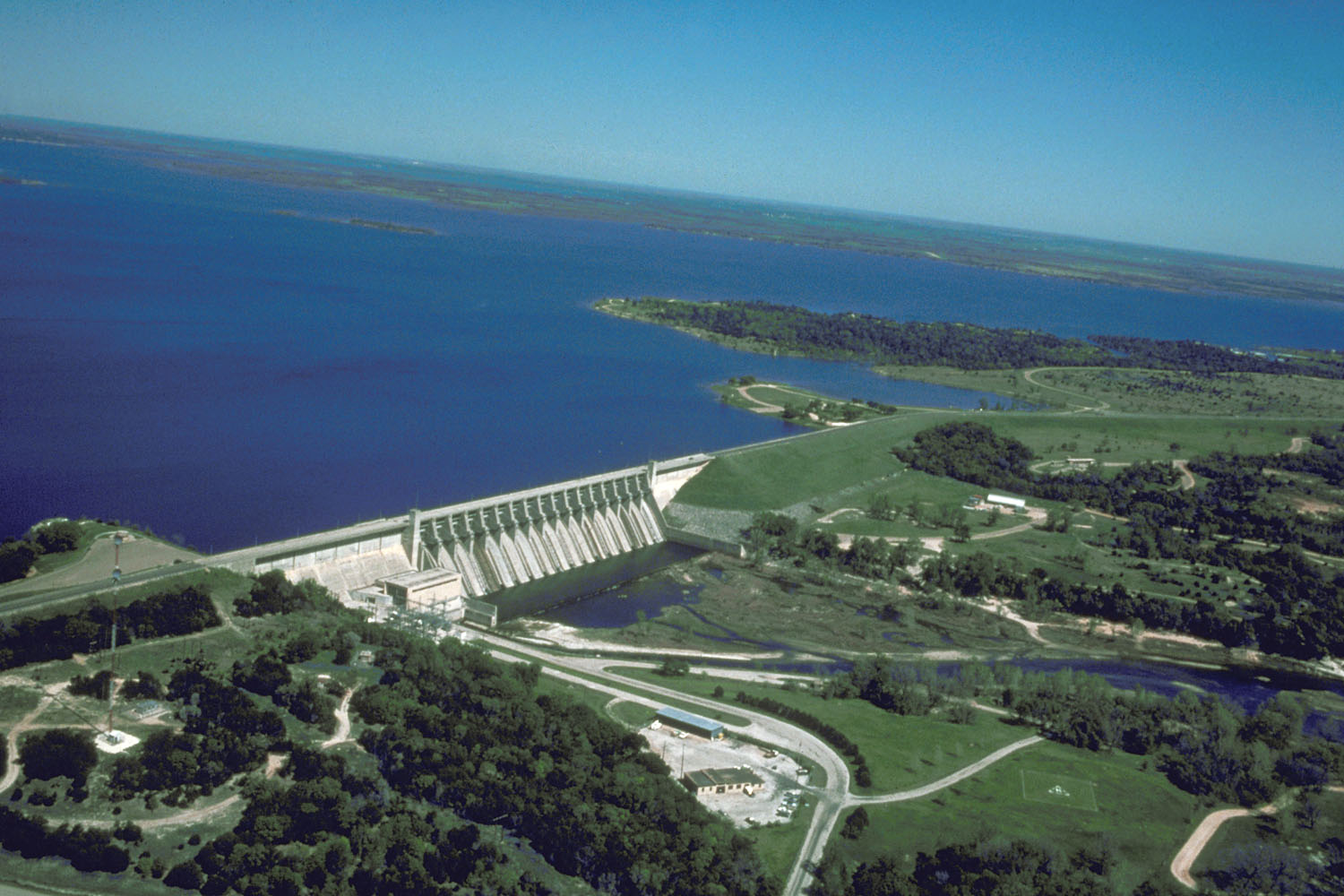

- Location within Texas Location within the United States
- Location: Bosque / Hill counties, Texas, United States
- Coordinates: 31°52′01″N 97°22′15″W
- Type: Reservoir
- Primary inflows: Brazos River, Nolan River
- Primary outflows: Brazos River
- Catchment area: 17,656 sq mi (45,730 km^{2})
- Basin countries: United States
- Surface area: 37 sq mi (96 km^{2})
- Max. depth: 108 ft (33 m)
- Surface elevation: 528 ft (161 m)

Lake Whitney is a flood control reservoir on the main stem of the Brazos River in Texas. It is located on River Mile Marker 442 and controls drainage for 17,656 square miles (45,730 km^{2}) of Texas and parts of New Mexico. The reservoir encompasses a surface area of more than 23,500 acres (95 km^{2}) and 225 miles (362 km) of shoreline. The area consists of rolling, tallgrass prairies; cedar trees; hardwood timber; and 100 ft (30 m) bluffs and rock points. Lake Whitney is also part of the Texas Lakes Trail Region of North Texas.

Whitney Dam is a concrete gravity and rolled-earth dam, 166 feet high, owned and operated by the United States Army Corps of Engineers.

== History ==
Before the presence of the lake, the Brazos River Valley provided a hospitable landscape for human occupation for centuries. Archeologists have unearthed prehistoric sites dating back to well over 12,000 years ago. Throughout the early 1800s, Comanche, Taovaya, Caddo, and Hainai peoples settled along banks of the Brazos in this area. The most prominent group, the Hainai, migrated from Louisiana in 1835. Anglo-American traders and soldiers referred to their settlement as Towash Village, for the name of the Hainai's chief. The arrival of substantial numbers of Anglo-American settlers in 1850 displaced the Hainai's village and were forced to move further upstream. The White pioneers apparently established a settlement, which they called Towash, at the site of the former Native American community.

Texas experienced a number of devastating floods in 1913 and 1921 resulting in death and destruction due to rivers overflowing from heavy rainfalls. As a result, in the 1930s the US government began approving and authorizing the building of dams along Texas rivers with the intention to absorb these floodwaters.

The plan to create the Whitney Reservoir on the Brazos River for flood control and other purposes, such as hydro-electric power development, was originally approved and authorized by Congress in 1941. However, when the US became involved in World War II, the funding was diverted to the war effort. Construction of the dam resumed in the Flood Control Act of 1944.

The construction of the dam started in May 1947 and the Brazos River was impounded in December 1951. The construction of the dam's powerhouse began in April 1951 and was completed in June 1953. After a record-breaking drought in Texas during the 1950s, there was an emphasis on reservoirs serving a secondary purpose as water storage facilities for Texas residents, communities, businesses, agriculture, and others.

Today, the U.S. Army Corps of Engineers continues to operate several flood control reservoirs within the Brazos River basin, including Lake Whitney.

== Fishing ==
Lake Whitney offers a wide variety of freshwater fish. Predominant fish species consists of the following:

- Striped bass
- White bass
- Smallmouth bass
- Largemouth bass
- Crappie
- Channel catfish
- Blue catfish
- Flathead catfish
- Alligator gar
- Gar

The Texas Parks and Wildlife departments advises anglers check bloom status for golden algae as it is toxic to the fish and will impact fishing practices.

== Recreation ==
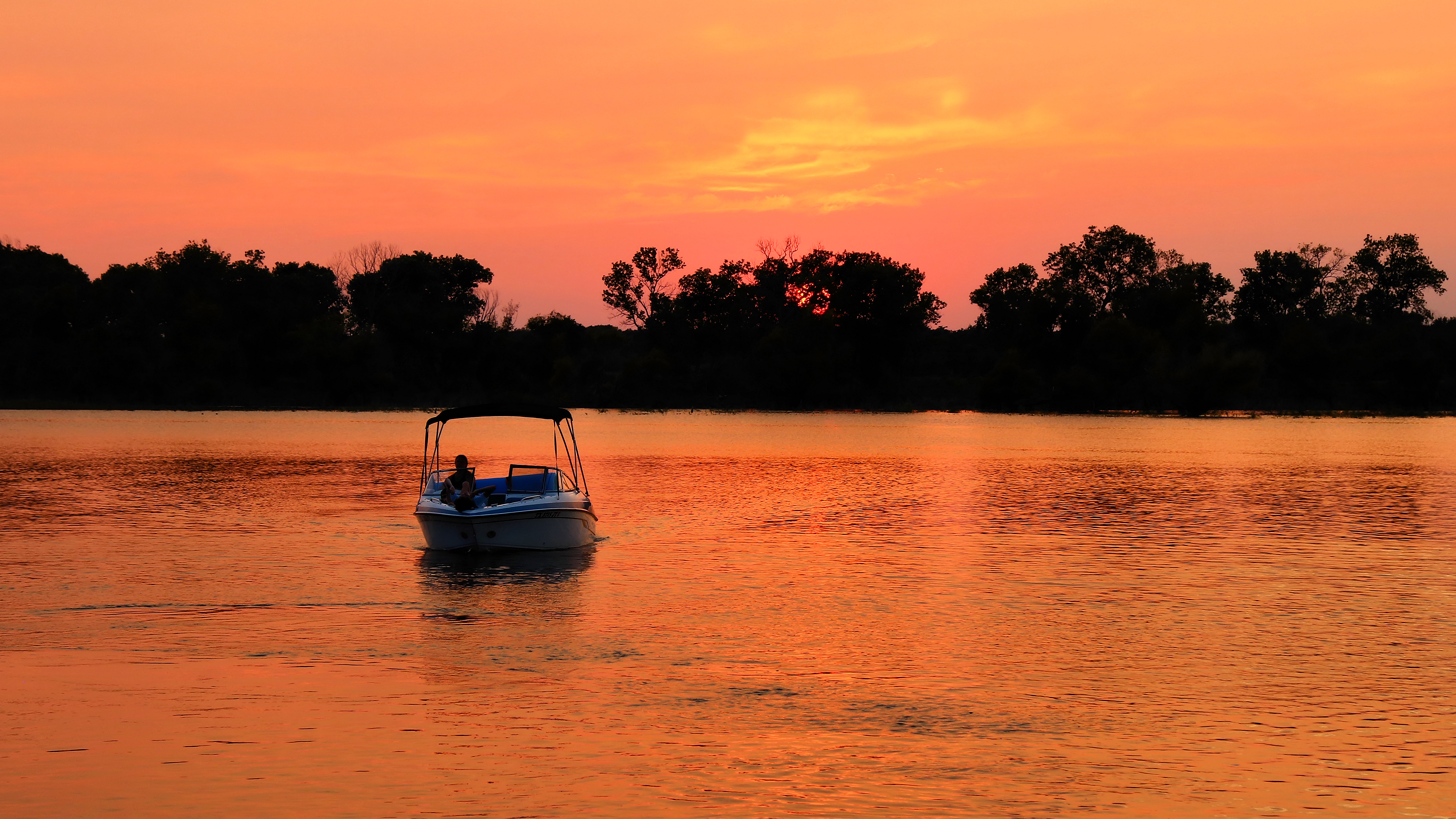
A boater on Lake Whitney heads to shore as night falls.

Lake Whitney is a year-round destination for Texas residents due to the abundance of water sports and activities all ages can enjoy and its proximity to Dallas-Fort Worth along the Interstate 35 Corridor. The most popular activities at the lake include fishing, boating, sailing, jet skiing, wakeboarding, water skiing, hunting, and golf. The area was designated as the Getaway Capital of Texas by the Texas Legislature in 2005.

In 2011, this designation was reconfirmed by the Regular Session of the 82nd Legislature in House Concurrent Resolution No. 83. This declaration reads as follows:

"WHEREAS, Texas is widely known for its excellent recreational activities and vacation destinations, and among the state's most unspoiled and inviting getaways is the picturesque Lake Whitney area; and

"WHEREAS, Located in the Brazos River Basin, Lake Whitney was one of the earliest recreational lakes built near the Dallas/Fort Worth area; completed in April 1951 as part of the Brazos River Conservation and Reclamation Program, it is maintained by the United States Army Corps of Engineers, Fort Worth District, and is situated five miles from the town of Whitney on the edge of Hill and Bosque Counties; other nearby communities that help provide visitors with the comforts of home include Hillsboro, Clifton, Meridian, Aquilla, Morgan, Lakeside Village, Laguna Park, Blum, Valley Mills, and Kopperl; and

"WHEREAS, The 955-acre Lake Whitney State Park features campsites, screened shelters, swimming beaches, boat ramps, and an air strip; the region also provides full service marinas and a broad range of overnight accommodations; and

"WHEREAS, Lake Whitney's reputation as a premier location to catch bass and catfish is a big draw for the nation's fishing enthusiasts, and the lake has received positive coverage from national sporting publications; and

"WHEREAS, For those who prefer their recreation on land, the area is home to a number of golf courses and 3,000 acres of winding trails for horseback riding; bird and wildlife watchers can delight in the lake area's 300 migratory and nonmigratory bird species, and a local wildlife population that features more than 50 different species of mammals, including the white-tailed deer; and

"WHEREAS, Historically visited by everyone from Native Americans and European settlers to gunslingers, such as John Wesley Hardin, the Lake Whitney area is today easily accessible from major metropolitan areas of the state, making it the perfect getaway for those who enjoy a relaxed pace and abundant amenities; and

"WHEREAS, The 79th Legislature of the State of Texas designated the Lake Whitney area as the Getaway Capital of Texas in 2005 in recognition of its myriad attractions; this outstanding destination remains as enjoyable as ever, and it is indeed fitting that this official title be continued; now, therefore, be it

"RESOLVED, That the 82nd Legislature of the State of Texas hereby redesignate the Lake Whitney area as the Getaway Capital of Texas."
