= Lake Bonham =

Lake in Texas

- Interactive map of Lake Bonham
- Coordinates: 33°38′47″N 96°09′05″W

Lake Bonham, also known as Bonham City Lake, is a reservoir located in Fannin County, Texas.

== History ==
The lake is located to the north of Bonham, east of Texas State Highway 78.

The like is primarily used to provide water to nearby towns, and is also a popular fishing site.

Lake Bonham park is situated on the southern shore.
