= Martinez, Texas =

- Unincorporated community
- Location within Texas Location within the United States
- Coordinates: 29°25′08″N 98°20′09″W
- Country: United States
- State: Texas
- County: Bexar
- Elevation: 686 ft (209 m)
- Time zone: UTC-6 (Central (CST))
  - Summer (DST): UTC-5 (CDT)
- Area code: 210
- GNIS feature ID: 1341023

Martinez is an unincorporated community in eastern Bexar County, Texas, United States. In 1990, its population was reported to be 75 residents. As of the 2020 census, it had a population of 27,466. It is located within the Greater San Antonio metropolitan area.

== History ==
Martinez was a station on the Galveston, Harrisburg and San Antonio Railway in 1877. Its population was 50 in 1910, with a store owned and operated by W.C. Schlather. It remained the same in 1940, with the opening of three more businesses. It continued to grow slowly, with the population reaching 75 in 1990. It was listed on county maps in 2000, but with no further population records. In the 2020s, it has a population of 27,466.

== Geography ==
Martinez lies near Converse at the intersection of Farm to Market Roads 1346 and 1516, ten miles east of Downtown San Antonio.

Two rivers that flow through the community are Martinez Creek and Calaveras Creek.

== Demographics ==
Historical population
Census	Pop.	Note	%±
1970	1,383		—
1980	5,150		272.4%
1990	8,887		72.6%
2000	11,508		29.5%
2010	18,198		58.1%
2020	27,466		50.9%
U.S. Decennial Census

Martinez racial composition as of 2020 (NH = Non-Hispanic) (Note: Note: the US Census treats Hispanic/Latino as an ethnic category. This table excludes Latinos from the racial categories and assigns them to a separate category. Hispanics/Latinos can be of any race.)
Race	Number	Percentage
White (NH)	8,563	37.54%
Black or African American (NH)	5,855	25.59%
Native American or Alaska Native (NH)	77	0.28%
Asian (NH)	728	2.65%
Pacific Islander (NH)	138	0.5%
Some Other Race (NH)	117	0.43%
Mixed/Multi-Racial (NH)	1,402	5.1%
Hispanic or Latino	11,786	42.91%
Total	27,466	

As of the 2020 United States census, there were 27,466 people, 8,435 households, and 6,176 families residing in the city. The population density was 1,818.3 inhabitants per square mile (702.0/km^{2}). The 4,009 housing units averaged 633.4 per square mile (244.5/km^{2}). Of the 8,435 households, 44.6% had children under the age of 18 living with them, 61.5% were married couples living together, 14.5% had a female householder with no husband present, and 19.8% were not families. About 15.5% of all households were made up of individuals, and 3.2% had someone living alone who was 65 years of age or older. The average household size was 2.94 and the average family size was 3.26.

In the city, the population was distributed as 31.0% under the age of 18, 8.0% from 18 to 24, 33.9% from 25 to 44, 20.8% from 45 to 64, and 6.4% who were 65 years of age or older. The median age was 32 years. For every 100 females, there were 95.5 males. For every 100 females age 18 and over, there were 89.2 males.

The median income for a household in the city was $47,947, and for a family was $49,396. Males had a median income of $32,631 versus $25,765 for females. The per capita income for the city was $18,949. About 4.9% of families and 6.5% of the population were below the poverty line, including 8.5% of those under age 18 and 10.5% of those age 65 or over.

== Education ==
Martinez is served by the East Central Independent School District. Children in the community attend Sinclair Elementary School in San Antonio.
