= Big Lake (Texas) =

- Location within Texas Location within the United States
- Location: Reagan County, Texas
- Coordinates: 31°10′N 101°29′W
- Type: intermittent lake
- Primary inflows: Big Lake Draw
- Basin countries: United States
- Surface area: 1,000 acres (400 ha)
- Surface elevation: 2,618 ft (798 m)

Big Lake is an intermittent dry lake located one-mile (1.6 km) south and southwest of the city of Big Lake in Reagan County, Texas.

Covering approximately 1,300 acres (530 ha), the playa lies in a floodplain and is fed primarily by Big Lake Draw and a number of other, unnamed smaller draws. Scrub brush, mesquite, juniper, grasses, and water-tolerant hardwoods grow around the lake.
