= Lake Tyler =

Reservoir in Tyler, Texas

- Lake Tyler East/West
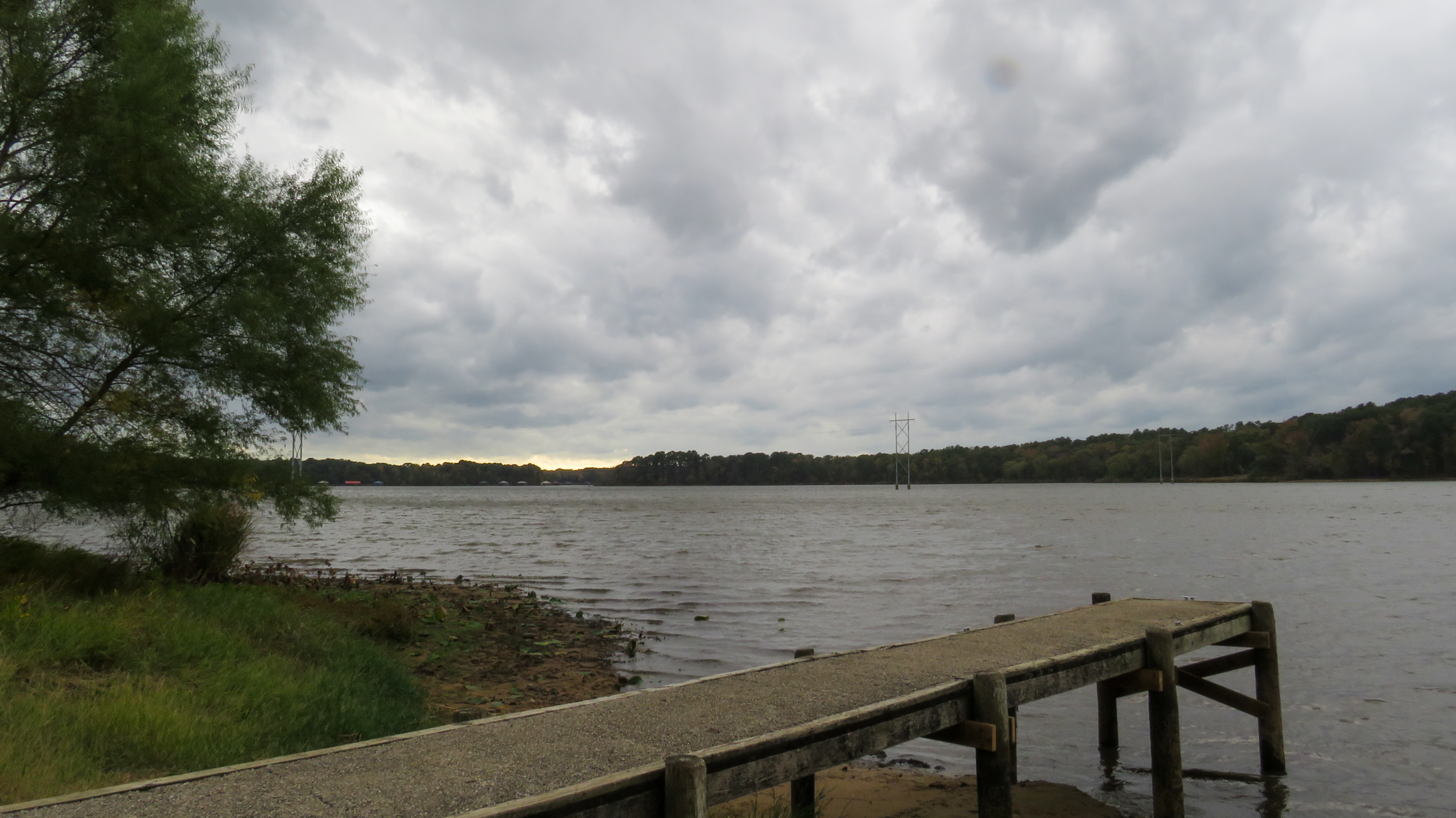
- View of Lake Tyler East from a Park on State Highway 64

- Location within Texas Location within the United States
- Location: Smith County, Texas, United States
- Coordinates: 32°12′40″N 95°10′28″W
- Type: reservoir
- Primary inflows: Caney Creek
- Primary outflows: Prairie and Mud Creeks
- Built: 1949 (West) and 1966 (East)
- Surface area: 4,714 acres (1,908 ha)
- Average depth: 17.6 ft (5.4 m)
- Max. depth: 40 ft (12 m)
- Surface elevation: 375 ft (114 m)

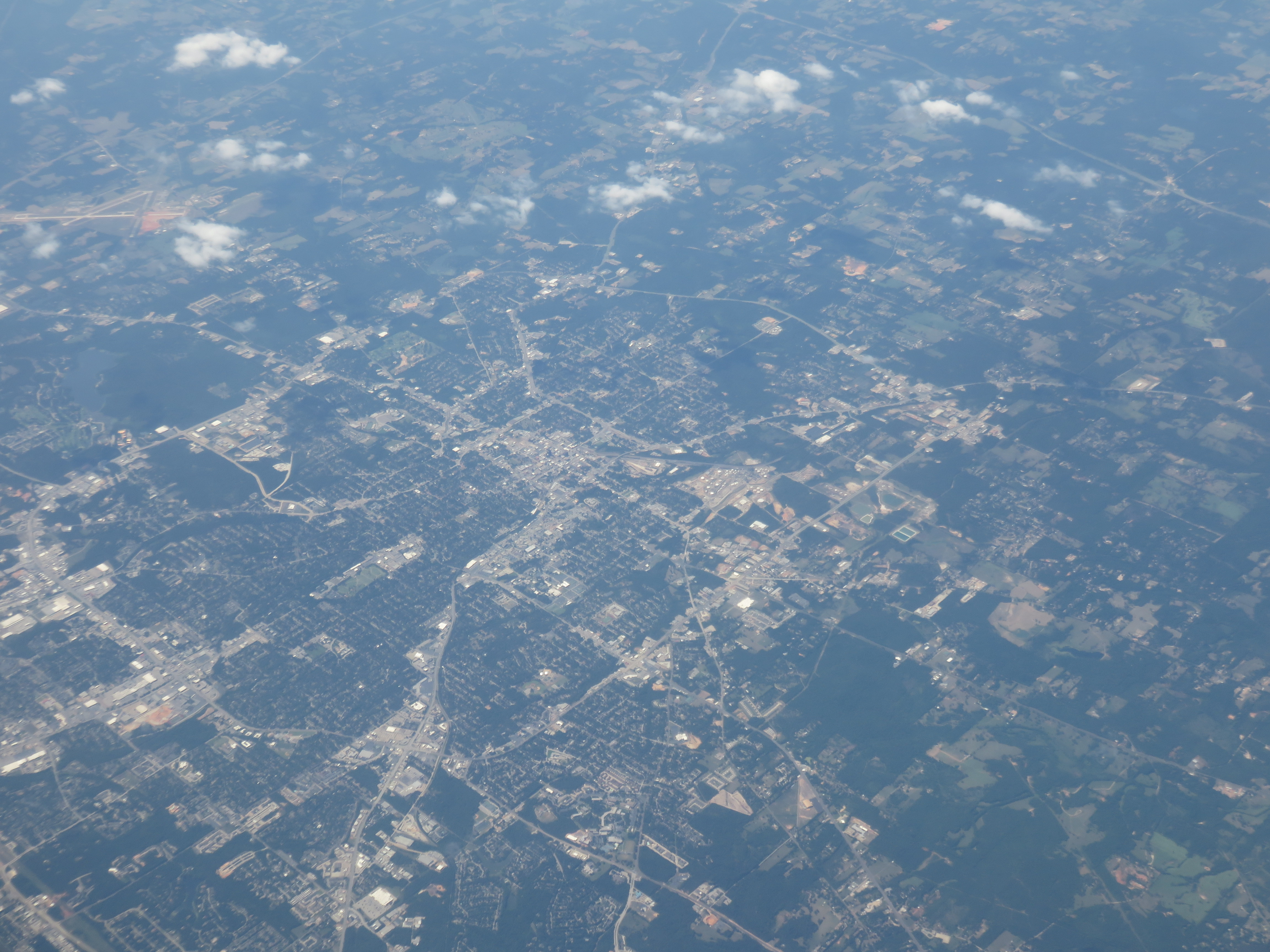
An aerial view of the city of Tyler, the namesake of Lake Tyler

Lake Tyler (West) is a man-made public water reservoir located south-east of Tyler, Texas, in eastern Smith County. While named after the town of Tyler (pop. 104,789), Lake Tyler is closer to the smaller cities of Whitehouse (pop. 7660) and Arp (pop. 970). Lake Tyler resides in the northern Neches River watershed, and was formed after the completion of Whitehouse Dam on Prairie Creek in 1949. The design engineer of the dam was T.C. Forrest (Now Forrest and Cotton, Inc.), and the earthfill dam was constructed to be 4,708 feet long, standing at a maximum height of 50 feet, with a width of 20 feet and a drainage area of 48 square miles, according to the Texas Water Development Board. Lake Tyler is found in the Piney Woods ecoregion of eastern Texas, a temperate coniferous forest hosting a great amount of biodiversity. Just to the east of the lake lies Lake Tyler East, created after the completion of Mud Creek Dam in early 1967. Just over a year later, in May 1968, the two lakes were connected by a canal to combine the water supply. Together, the two lakes have a combined safe yield of over 30 million gallons per day, and combine to encompass an approximate surface area of 4,714 acres, all maintained and operated by the city of Tyler to provide a source of public water to several surrounding communities.

== Hydrology ==
Lake Tyler was made by impounding Prairie Creek, which then becomes a tributary of Mud Creek. Mud Creek then serves as a headwater for the larger Angelina River, which itself is a tributary of the Neches River. The lake has an average depth of 17.6 feet, with a maximum depth of 40 feet. The elevation of the top water level is just over 375 feet above sea level with a 2-foot variation depending on water availability. The surface area of Lake Tyler is slightly less than that of its eastern counterpart, covering an average of 2,224 acres and a maximum of 2,400 acres. In 2011, a serious drought lowered the storage of the reservoir from the normal 80 thousand acre-feet to 50 thousand acre-feet, and did not return to normal levels until 2014. Floods are not as common in the region, and the most severe flood the reservoir sustained in recorded history was in July 2007, when the surface area increased to around 90 thousand acre-feet, equating to three feet of water rising above the flood pool level, causing damage to local buildings on the edge of the lake. A study of the sedimentation data in Texas in 1959 found the reservoir to be losing capacity at a rate of 103 acre-feet per year due to sediment deposition.

=== Physicochemical characteristics ===
A study on the trophic classification of Texas reservoirs in 2020 from the Texas Commission on Environmental Quality found that Lake Tyler had a mean chlorophyll-a (Chl-a) level of 11.72 μg/L, a mean Secchi disk depth of 1.46 meters, and a mean total phosphorus level of 0.02 mg/L. These characteristics classify Lake Tyler as a eutrophic lake. The table below, displays the levels of other nutrients in Lake Tyler as collected by the Environmental Protection Agency in a study on the quality of water in Texas reservoirs.

Lake Tyler Designated Uses and Numeric Criteria
Location	Aquatic Life Use	Water Supply Use	Cl^{−} (mg/L)	SO_{4}^{−2} (mg/L)	TDS (mg/L)	Dissolved Oxygen (mg/L)	pH Range (SU)	Temperature (°F)
Lake Tyler	High use	Public Water Supply - Municipal, Industrial, Domestic	50	50	200	5.0	6.0-8.5	93

Lake Tyler is of a relatively low salinity, with excellent levels for all solutes, aside from a slightly lower than average dissolved oxygen level as identified by the EPA. Furthermore, in a 2013 review of reservoir-specific chlorophyll-a criteria for Texas reservoirs, the EPA analyzed 40 measurements of Chl-a and determined that the results were adequate for maintaining the reservoirs designated uses, approving the criteria. A 2013 volumetric and sedimentation survey from the Texas Water Development Board collected core samples were taken of the sediment beneath Lake Tyler, with the goal of collecting a sample that contained both the current sediment and the sediment present before impoundment of water. In these samples, a pattern emerged where the first section of sediment was a dark silty loam with a high water content. Although the depth of the silty loam differed upon the location where the sample was collected, the core would always shift to a lighter sandy clay with organics present, indicating that the deeper sediment was likely present from before water was impounded to create the lake.

== Ecology ==
=== Flora ===
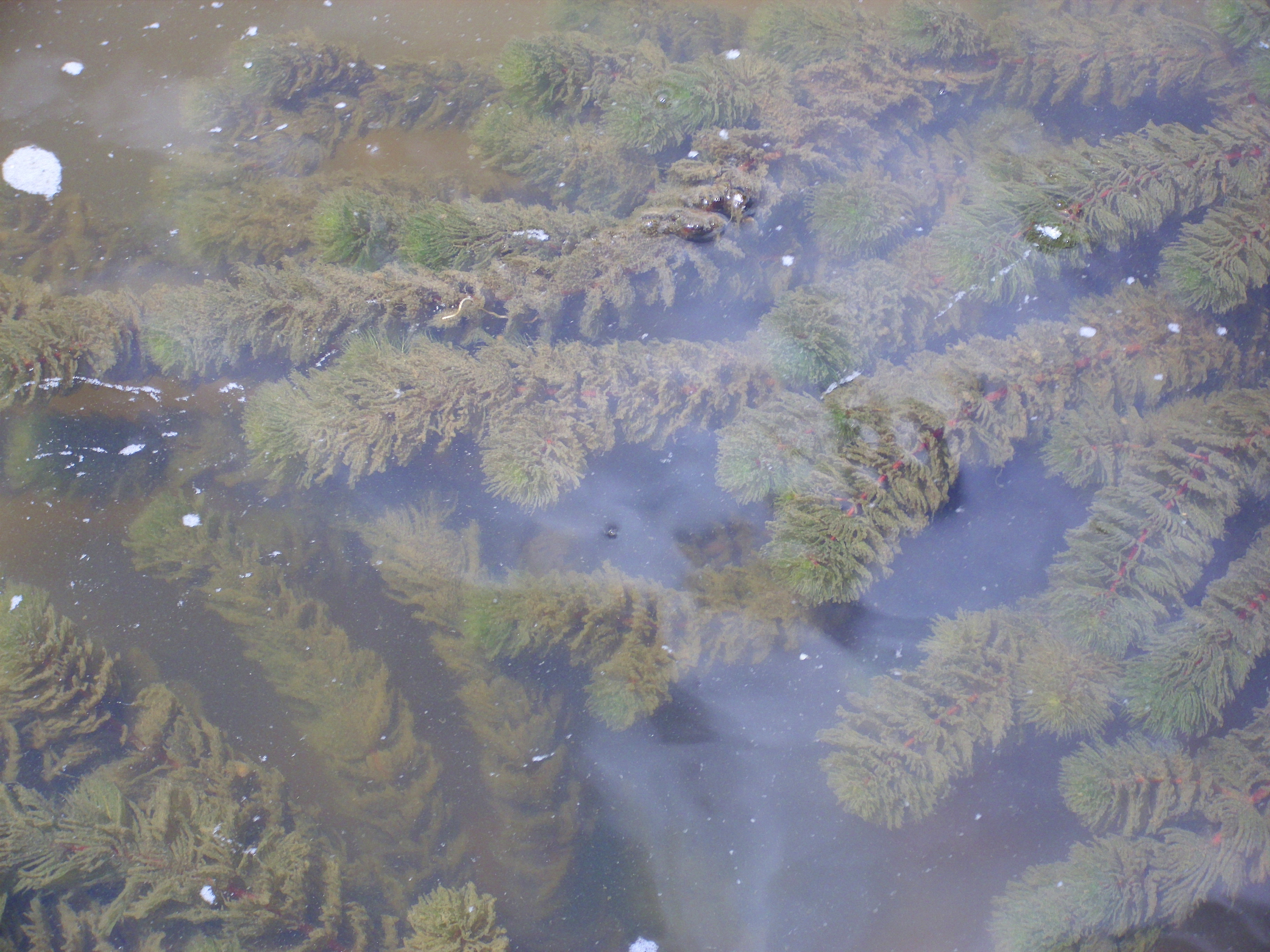
Coontail - Ceratophyllum demersum

A vegetation survey was conducted in 2019 by Texas Parks and Wildlife to identify the local flora at Lake Tyler. The following table identifies the aquatic vegetation present in their findings, along with the surface area in acres.

Surface Area (acres) of Vegetation by Year of Survey
	Coontail	Pondweed	Watermilfoil	Spatterdock	American Lotus	Panicum hemitomon	Bulrush	Water Primrose	Bladderwort	Buttonbush	White Water Lilly	Alligatorweed
2012	na	na	3	7	4	27	na	na	na	na	na	50
2015	70	2	na	23	na	174	na	4	na	na	na	4
2019	47	17	na	41	7	57	2	na	6	44	77	na

=== Fauna ===
The surrounding forest area of Lake Tyler is an avid location for bird watchers, as there have been over 220 species of birds recorded on site. Among these are the Wood Duck, the Red-headed Woodpecker, the Pileated Woodpecker, the Eastern Bluebird, the Summer Tanager, the Blue Grosbeak, along with several others. Lake Tyler is also stocked with a wide variety of fish, including Blue Catfish, Channel Catfish, White Bass, Spotted Bass, Largemouth Bass, Black Crappie, and White Crappie. Prey species for these sport fish included Threadfin Shad, Gizzard Shad, and Bluegill.

=== Nuisance species ===
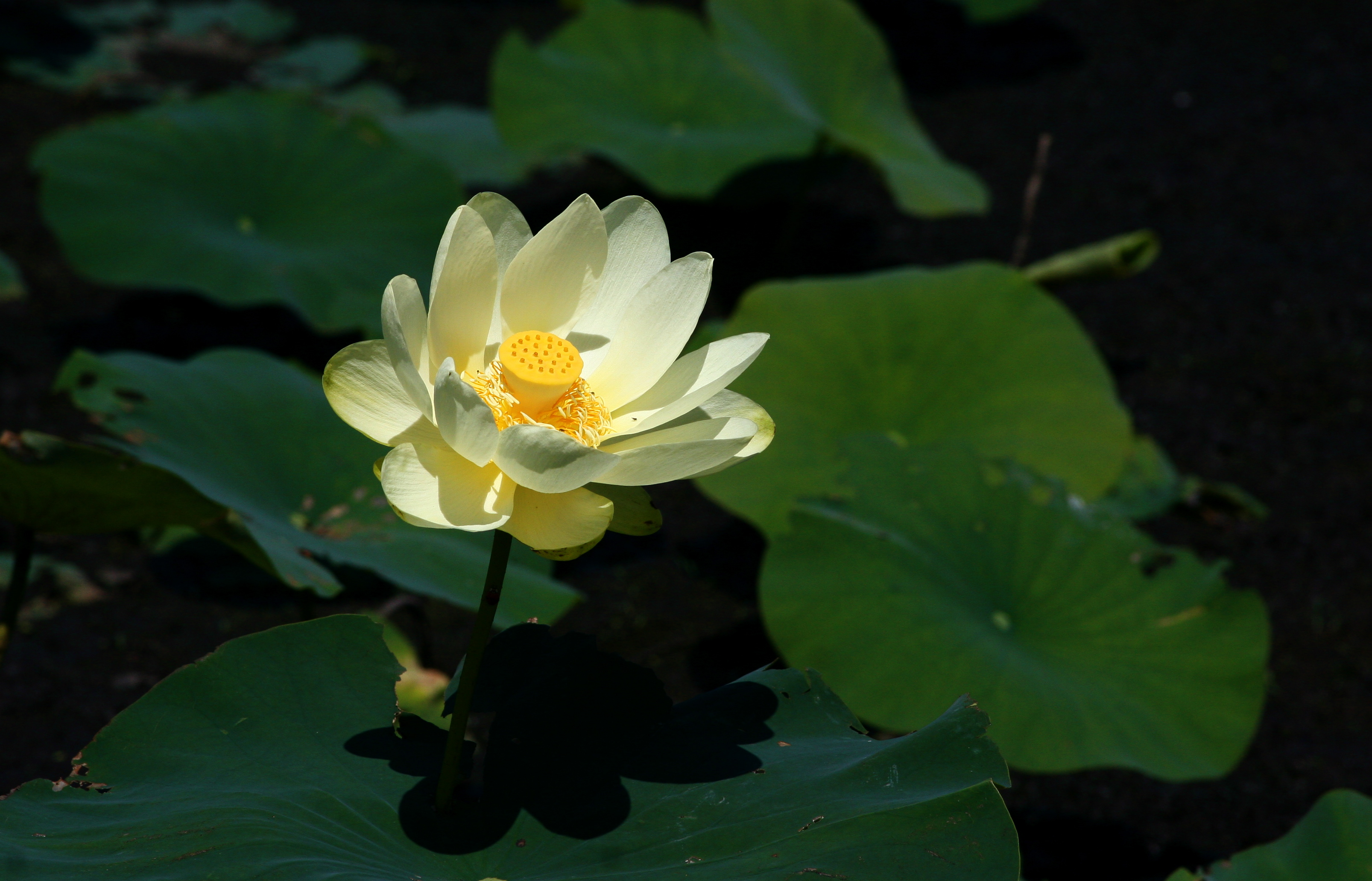
The American Lotus Flower - Nelumbo lutea

The only nuisance species currently present in Lake Tyler is pondweed. On July 6 of 2021, the city of Tyler proposed treatment for 0.07 acres of pondweed through mechanical means. The city of Tyler also proposed treatment for 50 acres of water hyacinth in the connected Lake Tyler East through chemical means, using a 2,4-D Amine formulation. Although there is currently no presence of invasive species, vegetative surveys in 2012 and 2015 from TPWD identified the presence of 50 acres and 4 acres of the invasive Alligatorweed, respectfully.

=== Climate ===
Lake Tyler and the surrounding areas are located near the western border of the South Central Plains (Pineywoods) ecoregion. This area is known for a humid subtropical climate with hot summers and short, chilly winters. There is an average rainfall of 46.7" per year, and 248 days out of the year have sunny weather. The first freeze usually occurs in the month of November, and an average of 1" of snow falls per year, usually in the late winter.

== Lake Use ==
Lake Tyler is primarily used as a means to provide a source of public water to the local community for years to come. However, the city of Tyler also maintains three recreational areas around Lake Tyler; Camp Tyler, Lake Tyler Petroleum Club, and the Lake Tyler Marina. Camp Tyler is a 350-acre outdoor learning center that serves as an educational area for the children of Tyler, the Petroleum Club offers cabins, venues, and a secondary marina. The main marina offers a boat launch, as well as an RV park with several activities for visitors of all age groups.

== Surrounding land use and effects ==
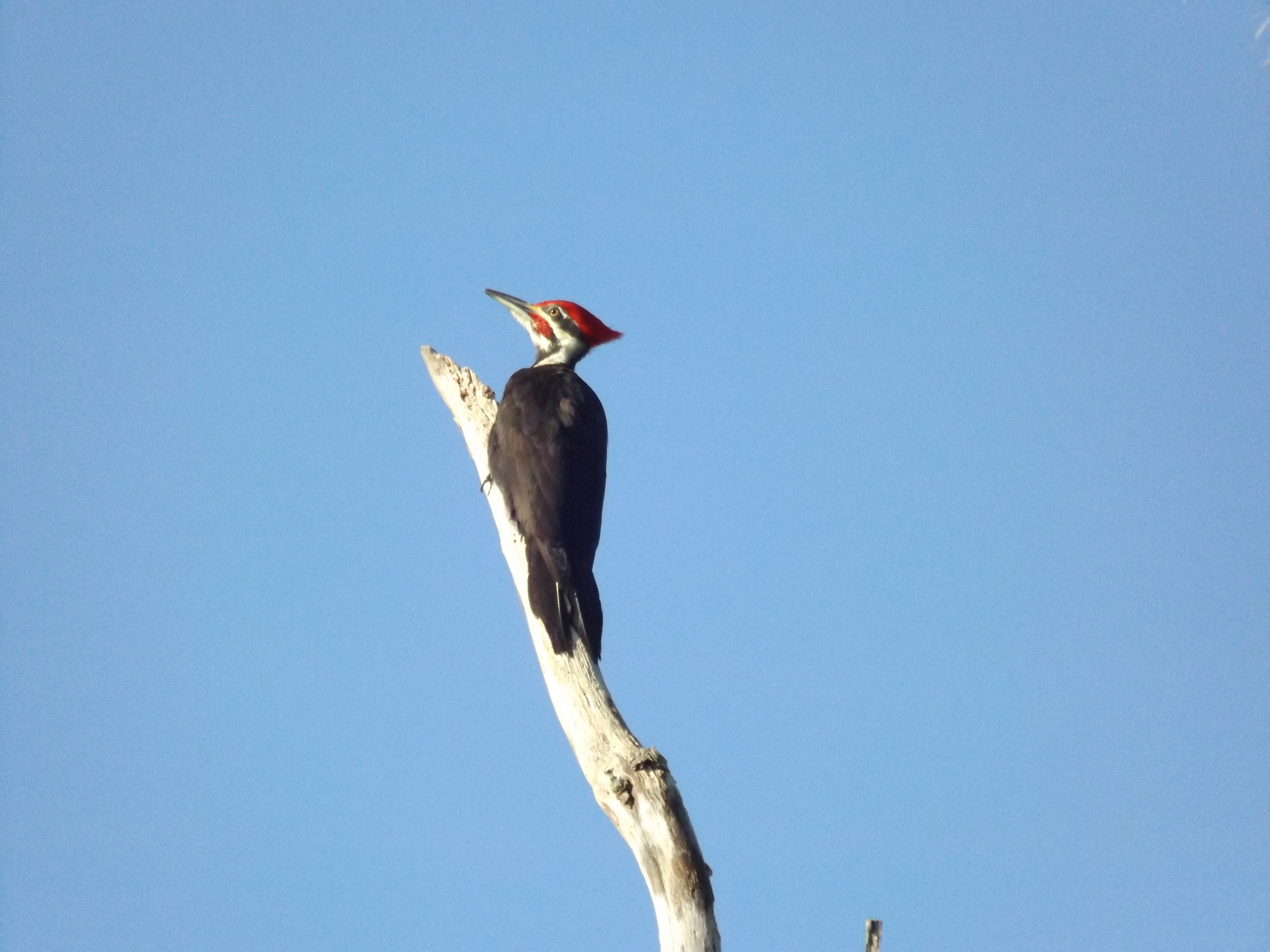
Pileated Woodpecker - Dryocopus pileatus

Several industries are present in the area around Lake Tyler, including Zee Mechanical Solutions, East Texas Canopy, and W-S Companies. There are also numerous local farms and ranches nearby, many of these passed down through generation of families. Despite the large amount of agricultural presence, it seems as though there is no current concern about runoff of nutrients affecting the lake.

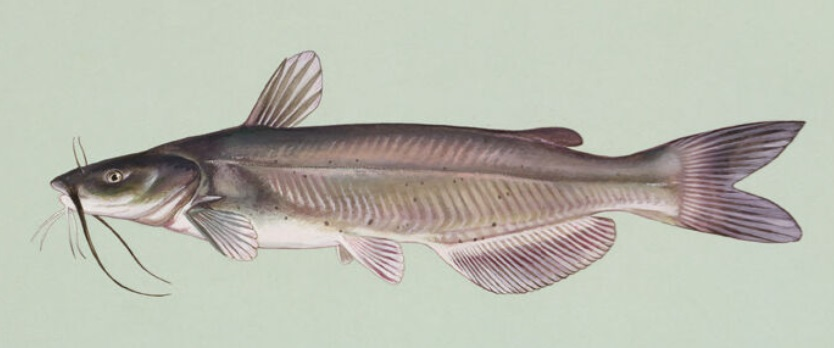
Channel Catfish - Ictalurus punctatus
