= Lake Nasworthy =

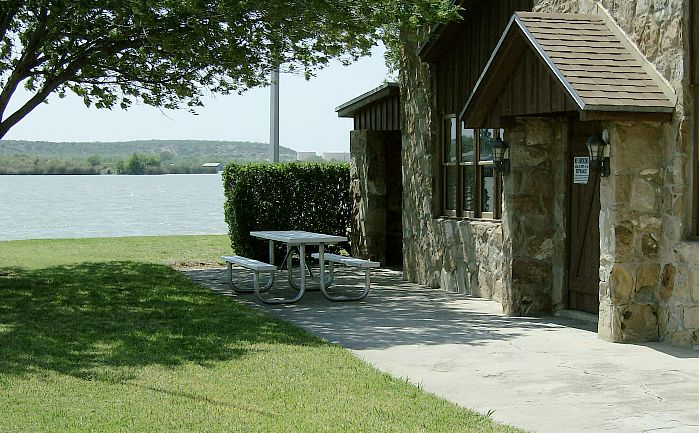
- Lake Nasworthy at Angelo State University Lake House (2009)

- Location within Texas Location within the United States
- Location: Tom Green County, 6 mi southwest of San Angelo, Texas
- Coordinates: 31°23′N 100°29′W
- Type: Municipal artificial lake
- Primary inflows: Twin Buttes Reservoir
- Primary outflows: South Concho River
- Basin countries: United States
- Surface area: 1,596 acres (6.46 km^{2})
- Max. depth: 29 ft (8.8 m)
- Water volume: 13,990 acre⋅ft (0.01726 km^{3})
- Surface elevation: 1,879 ft (573 m)

Lake Nasworthy is a small municipal lake located in San Angelo, Texas. The lake is named for John R. Nasworthy, who sold the land where the lake is located to the city. The lake was built by West Texas Utilities Company in 1930 to provide municipal water to the city of San Angelo and surrounding areas.

== Fish populations ==
Lake Nasworthy has been stocked with species of fish intended to improve the utility of the reservoir for recreational fishing. Fish present in Lake Nasworthy include largemouth bass, white bass, smallmouth bass, white crappie, hybrid striped bass, and catfish.

== Recreational uses ==
The City of San Angelo maintains recreational facilities at the lake, including Middle Concho Park, Knickerbocker Park, Mary Lee Park, and Pecan Creek Park. Boating and fishing are very popular. Angelo State University has lake facilities on the lake shore that includes a volleyball court, clubhouse, and even a boat ramp area (and if you're affiliated with Angelo State in any way, you can go to the facility anytime during opening hours). The San Angelo Parks and Recreation Department provides camping on the lake. Nearby Goodfellow Air Force Base also has a recreational area on the lake available to military members and their families.
