= Twin Buttes Reservoir =

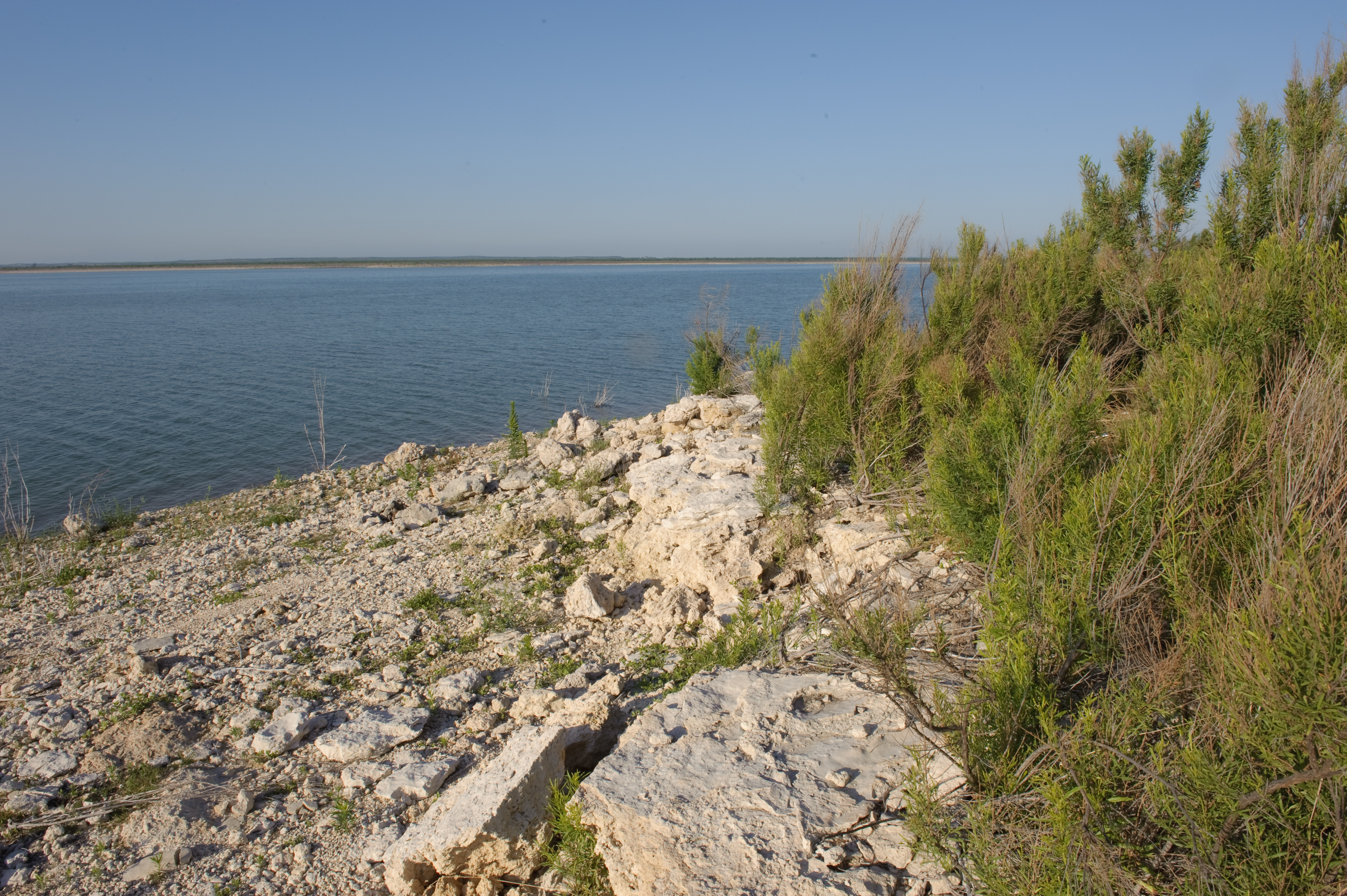

- Location within Texas Location within the United States
- Location: Tom Green County, southwest of San Angelo, Texas
- Coordinates: 31°22′37″N 100°32′01″W
- Type: Water supply reservoir
- Primary inflows: Middle Concho River, South Concho River, Spring Creek
- Primary outflows: Lake Nasworthy
- Basin countries: United States
- Surface area: 9,080 acres (3,670 ha)
- Max. depth: 46 ft (14 m)
- Water volume: 186,000 acre⋅ft (229,000,000 m^{3})
- Surface elevation: 1,940 ft (590 m)
- Settlements: San Angelo, Texas

Twin Buttes Reservoir is an artificial lake located about 6 mi (9.7 km) southwest of the city of San Angelo, Texas, and immediately upstream from Lake Nasworthy. Construction on Twin Buttes Dam to form the reservoir was completed in 1963. The dam is an unusual one – it dams the Middle and South Concho Rivers separately; a stabilization channel runs between the two sides of the lake. Water levels fell significantly during the 2010–13 Southern United States drought and remained low into 2014.

== Functions ==
Twin Buttes Reservoir was established to provide flood control, irrigation, water conservation, and a primary drinking water source for San Angelo and the surrounding communities in Tom Green County. The lake also serves as a recreational venue for fishing, boating, and swimming. The dam and reservoir are owned by the United States Bureau of Reclamation, and are managed by the City of San Angelo.

== Design ==
The Twin Buttes Reservoir has two dams, one on the Middle Concho River and the South Concho River. The length of these two rolled earthfill embankments is approximately 42,000 ft with an elevation of just under 2,000 ft above sea level; however, the water level is an average of 1,985 ft above sea level.

== Fish populations ==
Twin Buttes Reservoir has been stocked with species of fish intended to improve the utility of the reservoir for recreational fishing. Fish present in the lake include largemouth bass, white bass, catfish, and crappie.

== Vegetation ==
Three invasive species of vegetation have taken over the land around the reservoir. Along the shoreline is dense saltcedar and it grows thick with approximately 3,000 stems per acre. Willow baccharis and Mesquite both grow densely throughout the offshore areas.
