= Davy Crockett Lake (Fannin County, Texas) =

- Lake Crockett
- Location within Texas
- Location: Fannin County, Texas
- Coordinates: 33.730858°N 95.924980°W
- Surface area: 355-acre (143.66 ha; 0.55 sq mi)

Davy Crockett Lake is a 355-acre (143.66 ha; 0.55 sq mi) impounded body of water in the Caddo National Grassland on Dixon and Sandy creeks. It is located on FM 409, 14 miles (23 km) northeast of Bonham in Fannin County in the U.S. state of Texas. The lake has two geographical fingers, known as Crockett East and Crockett West. It was developed in 1935 under the National Industry Recovery Act. It is also known as Lake Crockett. Stocked fish include largemouth bass, channel catfish, crappie and bluegill.
