= Calaveras Creek =

Coordinates: 29.2201°N 98.2654°W

- Map

Location
- Country: United States
- State: Texas

Calaveras Creek is a waterway that starts near Martinez, Texas and runs for fifteen miles to its mouth at the San Antonio River. It is the source of Calaveras Lake where it is dammed near Elmendorf. Calaveras means skulls in Spanish.

== See also ==
- List of rivers of Texas
