= Texas State Highway 31 =

State highway in Texas

State Highway 31

Route information
- Maintained by TxDOT
- Length: 149.813 mi (241.101 km)
- Existed: 1919–present

Major junctions
- West end: US 84 near Waco
- I-45 / US 287 in Corsicana; US 175 in Athens; US 69 in Tyler; US 271 in Tyler; US 259 in Kilgore; I-20 near Kilgore
- East end: US 80 / Spur 63 at Longview

Location
- Country: United States
- State: Texas
- Counties: McLennan, Hill, Navarro, Henderson, Smith, Gregg

Highway system
- Highways in Texas; Interstate; US; State; Former; Toll; Loops; Spurs; FM/RM; Park; Rec
← SH 30	→ SH 32

State Highway 31 (SH 31) runs from U.S. 84 northeast of Waco via Corsicana, Athens, Tyler, Kilgore to U.S. 80 in Longview.

== History ==
Historic SH 31

SH 31 was a route proposed on October 9, 1917 to run from Waco northeast via Corsicana and Athens to Tyler, which remains the western portion of its current route to this day. On November 27, 1922, the route had been extended northeast to Gladewater, replacing part of SH 15 so that SH 15 had only one route west of Gladewater. On October 26, 1932, SH 31 Spur was designated through Malakoff. On September 26, 1939, the section from Tyler to Gladewater was reassigned to U.S. 271 (which it had been cosigned with earlier), with SH 31 now being extended east to Kilgore over former SH 176. SH 31 Spur was renumbered as Spur 63. On June 30, 1971, SH 31 was extended north to I-20 concurrent with US 259. When U.S. 259 was rerouted on July 25, 1985, SH 31 was extended northeast into Longview. In 2013, a new route was designated around Corsicana for a proposed bypass. Construction on the bypass began in 2016 and opened to traffic in 2021.

== Route description ==
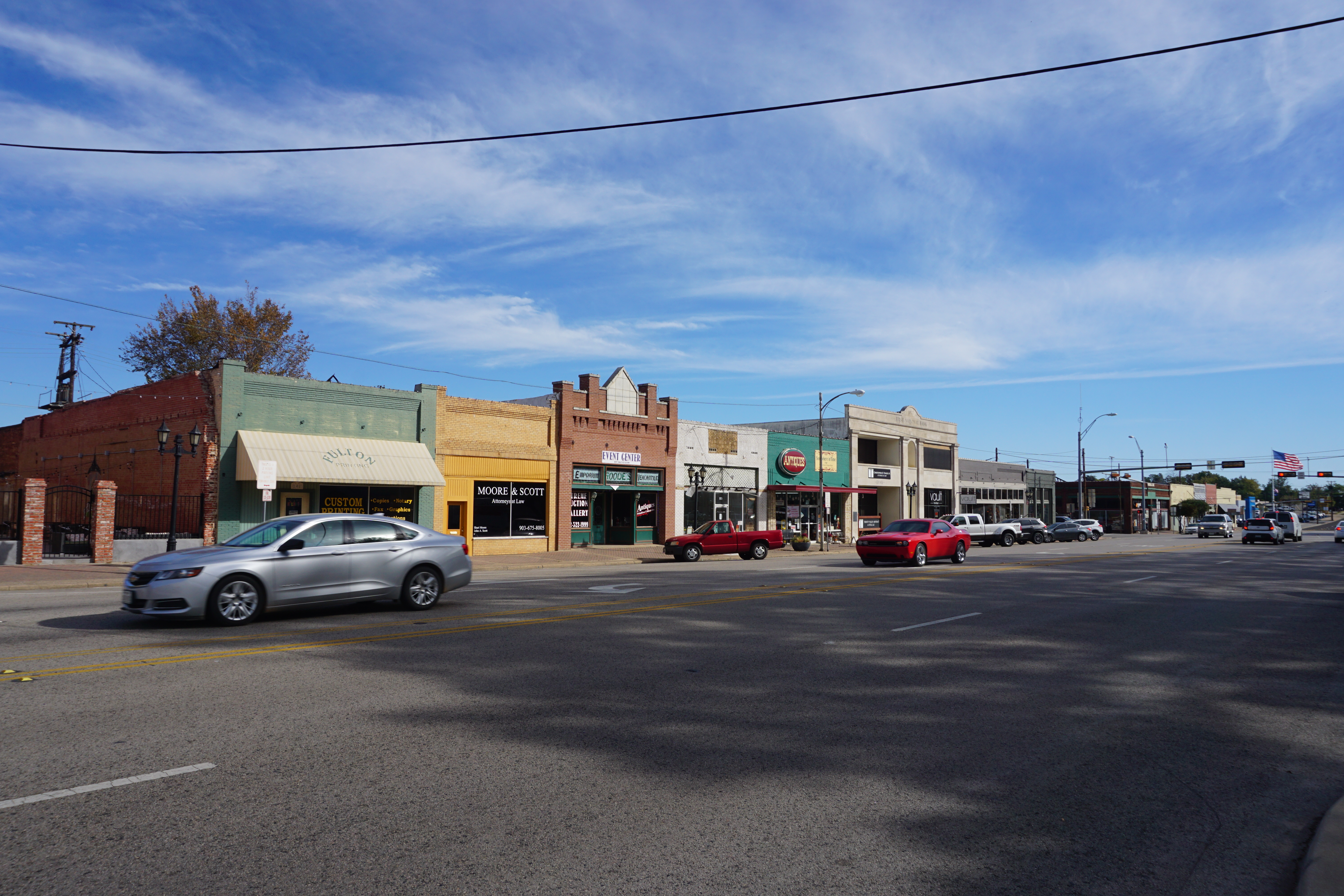
SH 31 Bus. as East Tyler Street in Athens

SH 31 begins at an interchange with US 84 northeast of Waco. The highway travels through rural areas of McLennan County, passing just north of Axtell. SH 31 intersects FM 939 then enters Hill County. In Hill County, the highway bypasses the towns of Mount Calm and Hubbard. Entering Navarro County, SH 31 runs through Dawson and has an overlap with FM 709 through the town then intersects FM 667 near Navarro Mills Lake. The highway then bypasses Corsicana, passing near or through the towns of Oak Valley, Retreat, and Mildred and intersects I-45 and US 287 in southeast Corsicana. SH 31 passes just north of the Richland-Chambers Reservoir before entering the town of Powell. The highway then travels through the town of Kerens before crossing the Trinity River into Henderson County.

In Henderson County, the route becomes less rural. SH 31 passes just south of the Cedar Creek Reservoir while serving the towns of Trinidad and Malakoff. The highway then enters Athens, bypassing the town on Loop 7; along with Loop 7, SH 31 also has overlaps with US 175 and SH 19 around Athens. SH 31 then leaves the loop in northeast Athens near an intersection with FM 317 then travels through the towns of Murchison and Brownsboro. The highway crosses over the northwestern segment of Lake Palestine, travels through Chandler, then crosses the Neches River into Smith County. SH 31 intersects Loop 49 Toll and travels through suburban areas of Smith County before entering Tyler. The highway travels through Tyler along Front Street, passing just south of the downtown area and serves as the southern terminus of US 271 near The Health Science Center at UT Tyler, then leaves the city just after intersecting Loop 323 for a second time. Leaving Tyler, the highway's route becomes more rural again, traveling through wooded areas before entering Kilgore. In Kilgore, SH 31 has a brief overlap with US 259 that lasts until I-20. The highway has an interchange with Loop 281 then enters Longview. SH 31 turns in a more northward direction at South Street then ends at US 80 near downtown, with the road continuing north as Spur 63.

== Major intersections ==
County	Location	mi	km	Destinations	Notes
McLennan		0.0– 0.4	0.0– 0.64	US 84 / League Ranch Road – Waco, Mexia, Fairfield	Interchange
McLennan		3.2	5.1	FM 1330 south – Axtell	Interchange
McLennan		5.0	8.0	FM 2311 west / Sutherland Road – Leroy	
McLennan		7.8	12.6	FM 939 south / County Line Road – Mart	
Hill		12.1	19.5	Bus. SH 31-K to FM 339 – Mount Calm, Birome	Interchange; eastbound exit and entrance
Hill		12.5	20.1	FM 339 – Mount Calm, Birome	Interchange; westbound exit and entrance
Hill		13.0	20.9	Bus. SH 31-K	Interchange; eastbound exit and entrance
Hill		16.9	27.2	Bus. SH 31-C	Interchange
Hill		18.4	29.6	FM 936	Interchange
Hill	Hubbard	20.3	32.7	SH 171 – Hubbard, Coolidge	Interchange
Hill		22.2	35.7	Bus. SH 31-C	Interchange; westbound exit and eastbound entrance
Navarro		24.1	38.8	FM 709 east	
Navarro	Dawson	26.5	42.6	FM 709 east – Dawson	West end of FM 709 overlap
Navarro	Dawson	26.7	43.0	FM 709 west – Spring Hill	East end of FM 709 overlap
Navarro		30.8	49.6	FM 667 north – Navarro Mills	
Navarro		33.5	53.9	FM 55 north – Blooming Grove	West end of FM 55 overlap
Navarro		33.9	54.6	FM 55 south	East end of FM 55 overlap
Navarro		38.9	62.6	FM 1126 – Barry	
Navarro		40.3	64.9	FM 2452 south – Corbet	
Navarro		41.1	66.1	Bus. SH 31-D east – Corsicana	
Navarro	Retreat	44.0	70.8	FM 2555	Interchange
Navarro	Retreat	45.5	73.2	FM 709	Interchange
Navarro	Corsicana	46.7	75.2	I-45	I-45 exit 227
Navarro	Corsicana	48.0	77.2	US 287 – Corsicana, Palestine	Interchange
Navarro		52.9	85.1	Bus. SH 31-D west – Corsicana	
Navarro		55.0	88.5	FM 1129 north – Roane	
Navarro	Powell	56.2	90.4	FM 633 south to FM 1393	
Navarro		58.2	93.7	FM 1393 south to FM 633	
Navarro	Kerens	61.9	99.6	FM 636 north	
Navarro	Kerens	62.3	100.3	SH 309 south to US 287 – Goodlow	
Navarro		67.5	108.6	FM 3096 south – Samaria	
Henderson	Trinidad	70.2	113.0	SH 274 north / FM 764 south – Seven Points, Tool, Trinidad Business District	
Henderson	Trinidad	70.9	114.1	FM 1667 south	
Henderson	Malakoff	75.2	121.0	SH 198 north / FM 2636 south – Gun Barrel City, Caney City, Log Cabin, Cross Roads	
Henderson		79.7	128.3	FM 753 south	
Henderson	Athens	81.5	131.2	Loop 7 west / Bus. SH 31-H east – Downtown Athens, Airport	Interchange; west end of Loop 7 overlap; access to UT Health Athens
Henderson	Athens	83.9	135.0	US 175 west / Bus. US 175 east – Mabank, Downtown Athens	Interchange; west end of US 175 overlap
Henderson	Athens	85.6	137.8	SH 19 north / Bus. SH 19-J south – Canton, Downtown Athens	Interchange; west end of SH 19 overlap
Henderson	Athens	87.5	140.8	FM 1616	
Henderson	Athens	88.0	141.6	Bus. SH 31-H west / Loop 7 south (US 175 east / SH 19 south) – Airport	Interchange; east end of Loop 7, US 175, and SH 19 overlaps; access to UT Health Athens
Henderson	Athens	88.4	142.3	FM 317 east – Leagueville	
Henderson	Murchison	93.3	150.2	FM 773 north (North Second Street) – Ben Wheeler	
Henderson		95.5	153.7	FM 1803 south / County Road 3823	West end of FM 1803 overlap
Henderson		96.3	155.0	FM 1803 north / County Road 3622	East end of FM 1803 overlap
Henderson	Brownsboro	100.6	161.9	FM 607 south – Leagueville, La Rue	
Henderson	Brownsboro	101.7	163.7	FM 314 – Edom, Poynor, Moore Station	
Henderson	Brownsboro	102.1	164.3	FM 3204 east	
Henderson		107.0	172.2	FM 3204 west	
Henderson	Chandler	109.8	176.7	FM 315 (North Broad Street)	
Smith		112.4	180.9	FM 2661	
Smith		113.7	183.0	Loop 49 Toll	
Smith		115.0	185.1	Spur 364 east	
Smith		115.6	186.0	FM 206 south	
Smith		116.1	186.8	Spur 164 south / County Road 1125	
Smith	Tyler	118.4	190.5	Loop 323	
Smith	Tyler	118.8	191.2	Loop 235 east (Chandler Highway)	
Smith	Tyler	120.0	193.1	US 69 / SH 64 / SH 110 (South Glenwood Boulevard)	
Smith	Tyler	121.2	195.1	SH 155 / US 271 north (South Beckham Avenue)	Access to The Health Science Center at UT Tyler
Smith	Tyler	121.4	195.4	Saunders Avenue / Fleishel Avenue	Interchange
Smith	Tyler	122.4	197.0	Loop 124 east (Old Henderson Highway) – Henderson	
Smith	Tyler	122.8	197.6	Loop 323 (South Southeast Loop 323)	
Smith		125.6	202.1	FM 850 west	West end of FM 850 overlap
Smith		125.7	202.3	FM 850 east – Overton	East end of FM 850 overlap
Smith		128.5	206.8	FM 2908 north	
Smith		132.1	212.6	FM 757 north / County Road 21 – Starrville	
Gregg		140.3	225.8	FM 2767 west	
Gregg		140.7	226.4	FM 3053 – Liberty City, Overton	
Gregg		142.8	229.8	FM 1639 south	
Gregg		142.9	230.0	FM 2012 south	
Gregg	Kilgore	145.1	233.5	SH 135 – Gladewater, Overton	Interchange
Gregg	Kilgore	146.6	235.9	SH 42 – White Oak, Kilgore Business District	
Gregg	Kilgore	147.8	237.9	Bus. US 259 south / FM 349 east – Kilgore	West end of US 259 Bus. overlap
Gregg	Kilgore	149.1	240.0	US 259 south / Bus. US 259 ends – Henderson	Interchange; westbound exit and eastbound entrance; east end of US 259 Bus. overlap; west end of US 259 overlap
Gregg		149.9	241.2	I-20 / US 259 north – Dallas	I-20 exit 589 westbound, 589A-B eastbound; east end of US 259 overlap
Gregg		150.3	241.9	FM 1252 west	
Gregg	Longview	154.4	248.5	Loop 281	Interchange
Gregg	Longview	155.7	250.6	FM 2205 west	
Gregg	Longview	156.5	251.9	US 80 (West Marshall Avenue) / Spur 63 north – Gladewater, Marshall	
1.000 mi = 1.609 km; 1.000 km = 0.621 mi: Concurrency terminus; Incomplete access

== Business routes ==
SH 31 has four business routes.

=== Hubbard business loop ===
Business State Highway 31-C
- Location: Hubbard
- Length: 4.6 mi (7.4 km)

Business State Highway 31-C (Bus. SH 31-C) is a business loop that runs through Hubbard. The highway is known locally as North 4th Street.

Junction list

The entire route is in Hill County.

Location	mi	km	Destinations	Notes
	0.0	0.0	SH 31	Interchange
	1.5	2.4	FM 936 south	
Hubbard	3.4	5.5	SH 171 – Hillsboro, Mexia	
	4.6	7.4	SH 31	Interchange
1.000 mi = 1.609 km; 1.000 km = 0.621 mi

=== Corsicana business loop ===
Business State Highway 31-D
- Location: Navarro County
- Length: 10.5 mi (16.9 km)
- Existed: 2013–present

Business State Highway 31-D (Bus. SH 31-D) is a business loop that runs through Corsicana. The route was designated in 2013.

The highway is known locally as 7th Avenue or Dr. Martin Luther King, Jr. Boulevard. Just east of FM 2555 (45th Street) the road passes by Navarro College.

Junction list

The entire route is in Navarro County.

Location	mi	km	Destinations	Notes
	0.0	0.0	SH 31	
Corsicana	2.9	4.7	FM 2555 (North 45th Street)	Access to Navarro Regional Hospital
Corsicana	5.3	8.5	SH 22 west / FM 709 west (South 15th Street) – Barry, Pursley	Access to Navarro Regional Hospital
Corsicana	5.9	9.5	I-45 BL (South 7th Street)	Interchange
Corsicana	7.0	11.3	I-45 (US 287) – Ennis, Richland	I-45 exit 231
	10.5	16.9	SH 31	
1.000 mi = 1.609 km; 1.000 km = 0.621 mi

=== Athens business loop ===
Business State Highway 31-H
- Location: Athens
- Length: 5.754 mi (9.260 km)
- Existed: May 27, 2004–present

Business State Highway 31-H (Bus. SH 31-H) is a business loop that runs through Athens. The route was designated in 2004 when SH 31 was re-routed along Loop 7.

The highway is known locally as Corsicana Street west of downtown and east of downtown it is known as Tyler Street and briefly runs along Prairieville Street for a block near the Henderson County Courthouse. SH 31 Bus. H has an overlap with US 175 Bus. in the western part of town.

Junction list

The entire route is in Athens, Henderson County.

mi	km	Destinations	Notes
0.0	0.0	SH 31 / Loop 7 – Corsicana, Mabank	Interchange
2.4	3.9	Bus. US 175 west – Kaufman	West end of US 175 Bus. overlap
3.2	5.1	Bus. US 175 east (Corsicana Street) / FM 2494 south (Prairieville Street) – Jacksonville, Trinity Valley Community College	East end of US 175 Bus. overlap
3.4	5.5	Bus. SH 19-J (Palestine Street) – Airport	Access to UT Health Athens
4.8	7.7	FM 2495 east (Flat Creek Road) – Lake Athens	
5.5	8.9	FM 1616 north	
6.4	10.3	SH 31 / Loop 7 (US 175 / SH 19) – Corsicana, Jacksonville	Interchange
1.000 mi = 1.609 km; 1.000 km = 0.621 mi: Concurrency terminus

=== Mount Calm business loop ===
Business State Highway 31-K
- Location: Mount Calm
- Length: 0.8 mi (1,300 m)
- Existed: July 30, 2015–present

Business State Highway 31-K (Bus. SH 31-K) is a business loop that runs near Mount Calm. The road was designated on July 30, 2015 when SH 31 was rerouted to the west.

Both ends of the highway have no access to westbound SH 31 with traffic only be able to access eastbound SH 31. The only highway SH 31 Bus. K intersects between its termini is FM 339.

Junction list

The entire route is in Hill County.

Location	mi	km	Destinations	Notes
	0.0	0.0	SH 31 east	
Mount Calm	0.3	0.48	FM 339 to SH 31 west – Birome	
	0.8	1.3	SH 31 east – Hubbard	
1.000 mi = 1.609 km; 1.000 km = 0.621 mi

== See also ==
- List of state highways in Texas
- List of highways numbered 31
