= Jessie Green =

American football player (born 1954)

No. 86
- Position: Wide receiver

Personal information
- Born: February 21, 1954 (age 72); Malakoff, Texas, U.S.
- Listed height: 6 ft 3 in (1.91 m)
- Listed weight: 191 lb (87 kg)

Career information
- High school: Malakoff
- College: Tulsa
- NFL draft: 1976: 10th round, 274th overall pick

Career history
- Green Bay Packers (1976); Seattle Seahawks (1979–1980)

Career NFL statistics
- Receptions: 5
- Receiving yards: 56
- Total TDs: 1
- Stats at Pro Football Reference

Jessie Ray Green (born February 21, 1954) is an American former professional football player who was a wide receiver in the National Football League (NFL). He played college football for the Tulsa Golden Hurricane.

== Biography ==
Green was born in Malakoff, Texas.

== Career ==
Green was selected by the Green Bay Packers in the tenth round of the 1976 NFL draft and was a member of the team that season. After two years away from the NFL, he spent two seasons with the Seattle Seahawks.

He played at the collegiate level at the University of Tulsa.
