= Ken Smith (tight end) =

American football player (born 1951)

No. 85
- Position: Tight end

Personal information
- Born: July 27, 1951 (age 75); Houston, Texas, U.S.
- Listed height: 6 ft 4 in (1.93 m)
- Listed weight: 225 lb (102 kg)

Career information
- High school: Malakoff (Malakoff, Texas)
- College: New Mexico
- NFL draft: 1973: undrafted

Career history
- Cleveland Browns (1973–1974)
- Stats at Pro Football Reference

Kenneth Leslie Smith (born July 27, 1951) is an American former professional football tight end who played for the Cleveland Browns of the National Football League (NFL). He played college football for the New Mexico Lobos.

== Early life ==
Kenneth Leslie Smith was born on July 27, 1951, in Houston, Texas. He played high school football at Malakoff High School in Malakoff, Texas, and was a four-year letterman.

== College career ==
Smith played junior college football at Navarro Junior College from 1969 to 1970. He transferred to the University of New Mexico, where he was a two-year letterman for the Lobos from 1971 to 1972, catching 41 passes for 663 yards and three touchdowns. He led New Mexico in receiving yards both years.

== Professional career ==
Smith signed with the Cleveland Browns after going undrafted in the 1973 NFL draft. He played in 13 games for the Browns during the 1973 season as a reserve tight end and special teams player without recording any statistics. He missed the 1974 season due to injury and was released on July 25, 1975.
