= Business routes of U.S. Route 175 =

Business U.S. Highway 175

Route information
- Maintained by TxDOT

Location
- Country: United States
- State: Texas

Highway system
- United States Numbered Highway System; List; Special; Divided; Highways in Texas; Interstate; US; State; Former; Toll; Loops; Spurs; FM/RM; Park; Rec

There are currently four business routes of U.S. Route 175 that are designated and maintained by the Texas Department of Transportation (TxDOT). The business routes in the US state of Texas are traditionally short spurs or loops that connect the main route, in this case, U.S. Route 175 (US 175), to the center or commercial district of a city. The routes commonly follow the course of a decommissioned state highway, or the old course of the main route. Business routes are signed with the traditional US 175 highway shield, and with a small "business plate" placed above the marker. TxDOT regards business routes as official highways, and is responsible for the maintenance of the route.

== Crandall ==
Business U.S. Highway 175
- Location: Crandall
- Length: 0.8 mi (1,300 m)
- Existed: December 19, 1991–August 29, 2002

Business US Route 175-B (Bus. US 175-B) is a former business loop of US 175 that served the town of Crandall.

Bus. US 175-B began at an intersection with the eastbound frontage road of US 175 just east of that highway's interchange with FM 741. The highway traveled south along Main Street, then turned east onto Trunk Street. Bus. US 175-B continued to run along Trunk Street before terminating at its parent route near FM 148.

Bus. US 175-B was designated in 1991 when Loop 219 was re-designated. The highway was cancelled and removed from the state highway system in 2002.

== Kemp ==
Business U.S. Highway 175
- Location: Kemp
- Length: 2.432 mi (3.914 km)
- Existed: June 21, 1990–present

Business US Route 175-D (Bus. US 175-D) is a business loop of US 175 that serves the town of Kemp.

Bus. US 175-D begins at an intersection with US 175 in northern Kemp. The highway travels in a southern direction along Elm Street, intersecting FM 1895 and FM 1391 near the center of the town. Bus. US 175-D intersects SH 274 in southern Kemp then ends at the eastbound US 175 frontage road.

Bus. US 175-D was designated in 1990 when Loop 346 was re-designated.

Junction list

The entire route is in Kemp, Kaufman County.

mi	km	Destinations	Notes
0.0	0.0	US 175 – Dallas, Athens	
1.1	1.8	FM 1895 north (9th Street) – Becker	
1.3	2.1	FM 1391 east (14th Street) to FM 90	
1.9	3.1	SH 274 to US 175 – Seven Points, Trinidad	
2.4	3.9	US 175 east – Athens	
1.000 mi = 1.609 km; 1.000 km = 0.621 mi

== Mabank ==
Business U.S. Highway 175
- Location: Mabank
- Length: 2.935 mi (4.723 km)
- Existed: June 21, 1990–present

Business US Route 175-E (Bus. US 175-E) is a business loop of US 175 that serves the town of Mabank.

Bus. US 175-E begins at an intersection with US 175 in northwestern Mabank. The highway travels in a southeastern direction along Mason Street, intersects SH 198 near the center of the town, then ends at an intersection with US 175 in eastern Mabank.

Bus. US 175-E was designated in 1990 when the US 175 bypass was completed.

Junction list

The entire route is in Mabank.

County	mi	km	Destinations	Notes
Kaufman	0.0	0.0	US 175 – Kemp, Athens	
Kaufman	1.6	2.6	SH 198 – Canton, Malakoff	
Henderson	2.9	4.7	US 175 – Athens	
1.000 mi = 1.609 km; 1.000 km = 0.621 mi

== Athens ==
Business U.S. Highway 175
- Location: Athens
- Length: 4.871 mi (7.839 km)
- Existed: May 27, 2004–present

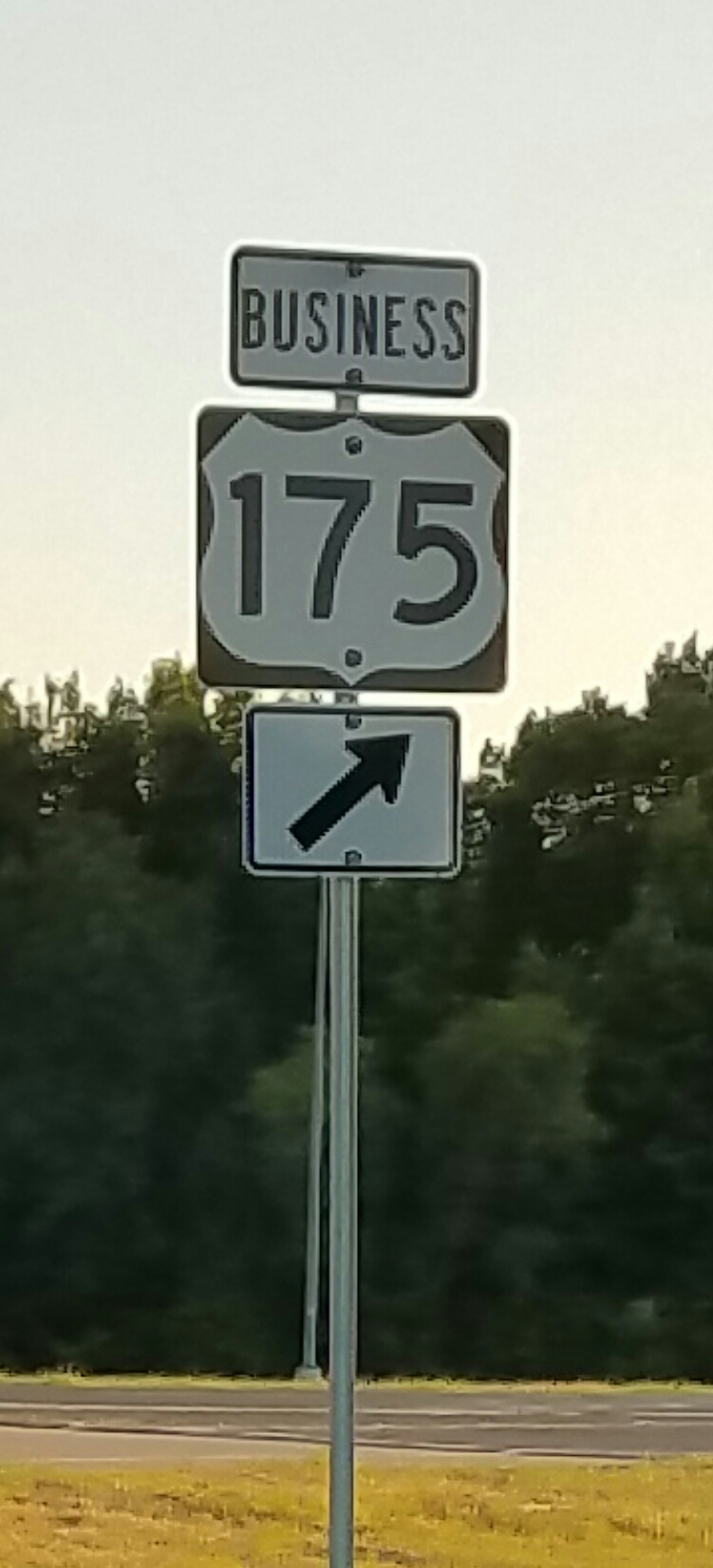
Sign display for Business US 175-G at its southeast terminus in Athens.

Business US Route 175-G (Bus. US 175-G) is a business loop of US 175 that serves the town of Athens.

Bus. US 175-G begins at an interchange with US 175 / SH 31 / Loop 7 in northwestern Athens. The highway travels in a southeastern direction through more industrialized areas of the town and passes near the East Texas Arboretum. Bus. US 175-G begins an overlap with Bus. SH 31 in the western part of the town, with the two highways traveling in an eastern direction along Corsicana Street. The overlap with Bus. SH 31 ends at the town square at an intersection with FM 2494, then the highway intersects Bus. SH 19 one block to the east. Bus. US 175-G continues to travel in an eastern direction then turns southeast at Crestway Drive, travels through less developed areas of the town then ends at an interchange with US 175 / SH 19 / Loop 7 in eastern Athens.

Bus. US 175-G was designated in 2004 along the old route of US 175 through Athens when that highway was re-routed around the town onto Loop 7.

Junction list

The entire route is in Athens, Henderson County.

mi	km	Destinations	Notes
0.0	0.0	US 175 / SH 31 / Loop 7 – Mabank, Jacksonville	Interchange
1.2	1.9	Bus. SH 31 west – Corsicana	West end of Bus. SH 31 overlap
2.1	3.4	Bus. SH 31 east / FM 2494 south (Prairieville Road) – Tyler, Trinity Valley Community College	East end of Bus. SH 31 overlap
2.2	3.5	Bus. SH 19 (Palestine Street) – Airport	Access to UT Health-Athens hospital
4.8	7.7	US 175 / SH 19 / Loop 7 – Mabank, Jacksonville	Interchange
1.000 mi = 1.609 km; 1.000 km = 0.621 mi: Concurrency terminus

== Poynor ==
Business U.S. Highway 175
- Location: Poynor
- Length: 1 mi (1.6 km)
- Existed: 2019–present

Business US Route 175-H (Bus. US 175-H) is a business loop of US 175 that serves the town of Poynor.

Bus. US 175-H begins at an intersection with US 175 just west of the town center of Poynor. The highway travels in a southeastern direction, then intersects FM 315 in the middle of town, then ends at another intersection with US 175 on the east side of Poynor.

Bus. US 175-H was designated in 2019 after a US 175 bypass was completed.

Junction list

The entire route is in Poynor, Henderson County.

mi	km	Destinations	Notes
0.0	0.0	US 175 – Athens, Frankston	
0.5	0.80	FM 315 – Chandler, Palestine	
1.0	1.6	US 175 – Athens, Frankston	
1.000 mi = 1.609 km; 1.000 km = 0.621 mi
