= Alligator School House, Texas =

Ghost town in Texas, US

Alligator School House
- Ghost town
- Location in Texas
- Coordinates: 32°03′34″N 96°11′54″W
- Country: United States
- State: Texas
- County: Navarro

Alligator School House is a ghost town in Navarro County, Texas, United States. Situated on Texas State Highway 309, it was established in the 20th century, as a school of the same name; the schoolhouse was later consolidated by Kerens Independent School District. The community peaked in the mid-1930s, and was abandoned by the mid-1960s.
