= Navasota River =

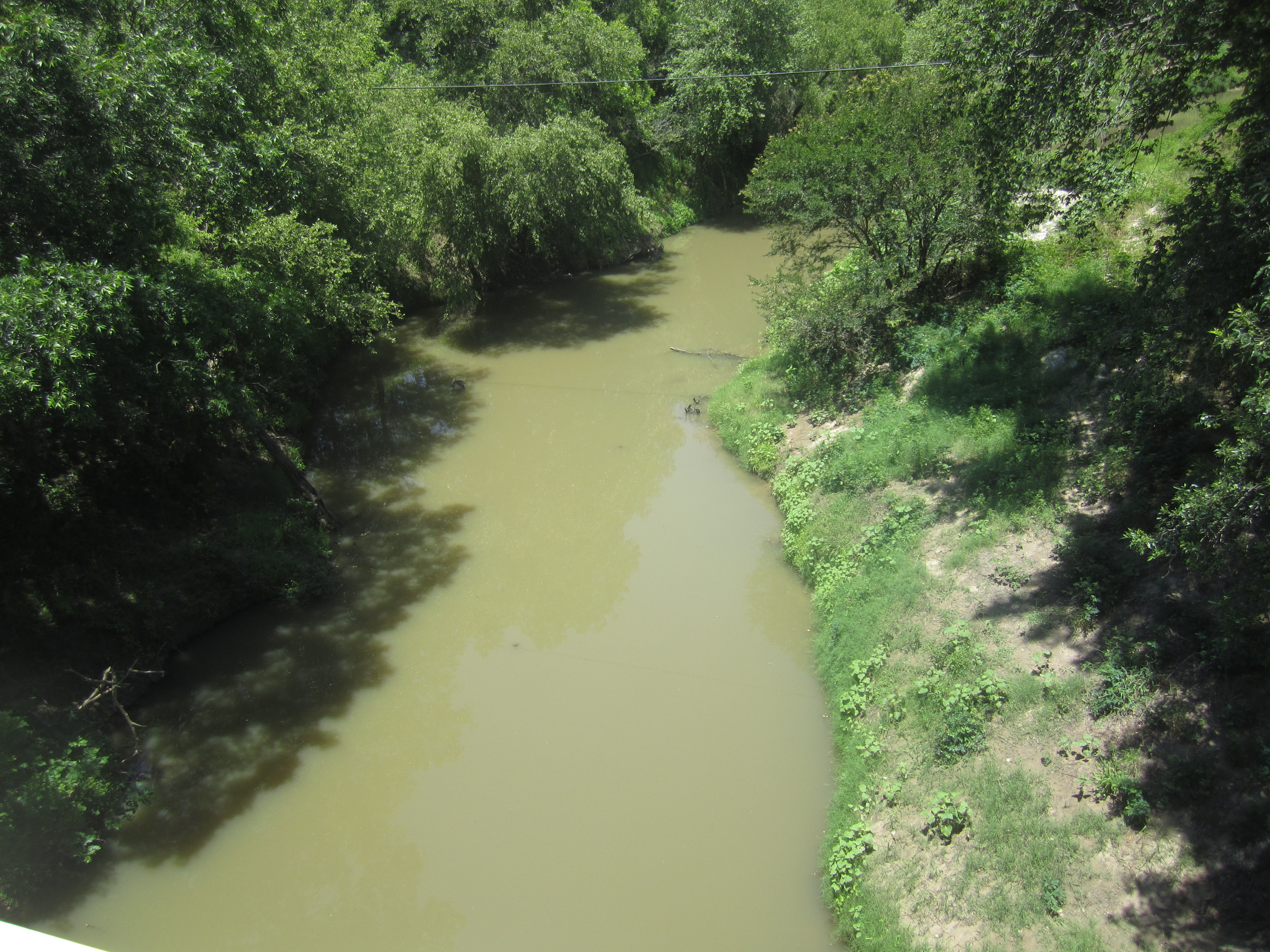
- The Navasota as it separates Leon and Robertson Counties in Texas
- Map Map of the Navasota River

Location
- Country: United States
- State: Texas

Physical characteristics
- Source confluence
  - location: 3.5 miles NNW of Mount Calm, Hill County, Texas
  - coordinates: 31°48′24″N 96°52′00″W
  - elevation: 196 m (643 ft)
- Mouth: at its confluence with the Brazos River.
  - location: where Brazos County, Texas, Grimes County, Texas, and Washington County, Texas converge.
  - coordinates: 30°19′54″N 96°09′15″W
  - elevation: 44 m (144 ft)
- Length: 201 km (125 mi)
- Discharge
  - location: Washington-on-the-Brazos, Texas
  - minimum: 0.76 m^{3}/s (27 cu ft/s)
  - maximum: 2,390 m^{3}/s (84,000 cu ft/s)

The Navasota River is a river in the U.S. state of Texas. Around 125 miles (201 km) long, it begins near Mount Calm and flows south into the Brazos River at a point where Brazos, Grimes, and Washington Counties converge.

== Name ==
The river has been known by several names. The indigenous people called it the Nabasoto, Domingo Terán de los Ríos called it San Cypriano, Fr. Isidro Félix de Espinosa called it the San Buenaventura, and in 1727, Pedro de Rivera y Villalón named it the Navasota.

== Lakes ==
The Navasota River is dammed to form several lakes, including Lake Mexia, Springfield Lake, Joe Echols Lake, Lake Groesbeck, Lake Limestone, and Lake Fort Parker in Fort Parker State Park.

== See also ==
- List of rivers of Texas
- Navasota, Texas
