= Texas State Highway 309 =

State highway in Texas

State Highway 309
- SH 309, highlighted in red

Route information
- Maintained by TxDOT
- Length: 11.684 mi (18.804 km)
- Existed: 1939–present

Major junctions
- South end: Highway 309 Boat Ramp on Richland-Chambers Reservoir
- US 287 near Eureka
- North end: SH 31 in Kerens

Location
- Country: United States
- State: Texas

Highway system
- Highways in Texas; Interstate; US; State; Former; Toll; Loops; Spurs; FM/RM; Park; Rec
← SH 308	→ SH 310

State Highway 309 (SH 309) is a Texas state highway that runs from Kerens south to U.S. Highway 287 near the Richland-Chambers Reservoir. This route was designated on February 20. 1939 along its current path, which extended another mile to the south. On March 29, 1990, SH 309 was rerouted in Kerens along Senter Avenue rather than Fourth Street and Colket Avenue. This section, from the new route of US 287 south to the old location of US 287, was removed on November 29, 1990, as portions of the route and US 287 were submerged by the newly impounded Richland Chambers Reservoir.

== Route description ==
SH 309 begins at boat ramp 0.5 miles (0.8 km) south of US 287 on the Richland-Chambers Reservoir and heads north to a junction with US 287. It heads northwest from this junction to an intersection with FM 635. The highway continues to the northwest to an intersection with FM 1393. Heading towards the northwest, the highway continues to an intersection with FM 3096 in Kerens. SH 309 reaches its northern terminus at SH 31 in Kerens.

== Junction list ==
The entire route is in Navarro County.

Location	mi	km	Destinations	Notes
	0.0	0.0	Highway 309 Boat Ramp	
	1.2	1.9	US 287 – Corsicana, Palestine	
	3.6	5.8	FM 635 east – Rural Shade	
	8.6	13.8	FM 1393 north to SH 31	
Kerens	11.3	18.2	FM 3096 east – Samaria	
Kerens	11.7	18.8	SH 31 – Powell, Trinidad	
1.000 mi = 1.609 km; 1.000 km = 0.621 mi
