= Hubbard High School =

Hubbard High School may refer to:

- Hubbard High School (Texas), Hubbard, Texas
- Hubbard High School (Ohio), Hubbard, Ohio
- Hubbard High School (Chicago), Chicago, Illinois
- Hubbard-Radcliffe High School, Hubbard, Iowa
- Emerson-Hubbard High School, Emerson, Nebraska
