= Malakoff Independent School District =

School district in Texas

Malakoff Independent School District is a public school district based in Malakoff, Texas, United States.

In addition to Malakoff, the district serves Star Harbor, most of Caney City and Tool, and small portions of Trinidad, Log Cabin, and Athens.

In 2009, the school district was rated "exemplary" by the Texas Education Agency.

== Schools ==
- Malakoff High (grades 9-12)
- Malakoff Jr High (grades 7-8)
- Malakoff Intermediate (grades 5-6)
- Malakoff Elementary (prekindergarten-grade 4)
- Tool Elementary (prekindergarten-grade 4)
