= Athens Airport (disambiguation) =

Athens Airport or Athens International Airport is the primary airport of Athens, Greece.

Athens Airport may also refer to:

- Athens Airport Station, the railway station of Athens International Airport
- Ellinikon International Airport, the old airport of Athens, Greece
- Athens Ben Epps Airport in Athens, Georgia, United States
- Athens Municipal Airport in Athens, Texas, United States
