= Texas State Highway Loop 7 =

State highway in Texas

State Highway Loop 7
- Jed Robinson Loop; Dewitt C. Greer Loop
- SH Loop 7; highlighted in red

Route information
- Maintained by TxDOT
- Length: 16.6 mi (26.7 km)
- Existed: 2005–present

Major junctions
- Beltway around Athens
- SH 31 / Bus. SH 31; US 175 / Bus. US 175; SH 19 / Bus. SH 19

Location
- Country: United States
- State: Texas

Highway system
- Highways in Texas; Interstate; US; State; Former; Toll; Loops; Spurs; FM/RM; Park; Rec
| ← SH 7 | → PR 7 |

Loop 7 is a beltway in the U.S. state of Texas around the town of Athens. The highway additionally serves as a bypass for U.S. Highway 175 (US 175), State Highway 19 (SH 19), and SH 31 around the town.

== Route description ==
Loop 7 officially begins at an interchange with SH 31 (West Corsicana Street) west of downtown Athens. SH 31 overlaps with Loop 7 and the two highways turn northeast before having an interchange with US 175; that highway then joins the overlap as well. The beltway turns towards the east and has an interchange with SH 19; SH 19 joins the beltway. Loop 7 continues to run east with SH 31 leaving at an interchange with Business SH 31 (Bus. SH 31, East Tyler Street). Loop 7 turns south at the interchange and has an interchange with Farm to Market Road 2495 (FM 2495). Loop 7 starts turning southeast with US 175 leaving at an interchange with Bus. US 175 (E. Corsicana Street). After US 175 leaves the beltway, Loop 7 turns west with SH 19 leaving at an interchange with Bus. SH 19 (South Palestine Street). After SH 19 leaves the beltway, Loop 7 travels without any concurrences and has an interchange with FM 59 and FM 2494. After the FM 2494 interchange, Loop 7 turns north before arriving back at its start point with SH 31 (West Corsicana Street).

== History ==
=== Loop 7 (1939) ===
State Highway Loop 7
- Location: Jasper County
- Existed: September 26, 1939–January 26, 1965

A previous route numbered Loop 7 was designated on September 26, 1939, as a loop off US 59 (now US 96) through Jasper as a renumbering of SH 8 Spur. On June 12, 1945, the road was reassigned to old US 96 while the former route of Loop 7 became a portion of US 96. This Loop 7 was cancelled on January 26, 1965.

=== Current route ===
The section of Loop 7 from SH 31 (West Corsicana Street) to FM 317 was originally the westernmost section of FM 317. This portion of FM 317 was redesignated as Loop 7 on January 28, 2005. On May 30, 2013, SH 31 was rerouted around Athens, bypassing the town and overlapping with Loop 7.

== Junction list ==
The entire route is in Henderson County. All exits are unnumbered.

| Location | mi | km | Destinations | Notes |
|---|---|---|---|---|
| Athens | 0.0 | 0.0 | SH 31 west / Bus. SH 31 east – Corsicana, Athens | Interchange; counter-clockwise end of SH 31 concurrency |
| Athens | | | US 175 west / Bus. US 175 east – Mabank, Athens | Interchange; counter-clockwise end of US 175 concurrency |
| Athens | | | SH 19 north / Bus. SH 19 south – Canton, Athens | Interchange; counter-clockwise end of SH 19 concurrency |
| Athens | | | FM 1616 north – Murchison | |
| Athens | | | SH 31 east / Bus. SH 31 west – Tyler, Athens | Interchange; clockwise end of SH 31 concurrency |
| Athens | | | FM 2495 – Texas Freshwater Fisheries Center | Interchange |
| Athens | | | US 175 west / Bus. US 175 east – Jacksonville, Athens | Interchange; clockwise end of US 175 concurrency |
| Athens | | | SH 19 south / Bus. SH 19 north – Palestine, Athens | Interchange; clockwise end of SH 19 concurrency |
| | | | FM 59 – Cayuga, Athens | Interchange |
| | 16.6 | 26.7 | FM 2494 | Interchange |
1.000 mi = 1.609 km; 1.000 km = 0.621 mi: Concurrency terminus
