= Mount Calm Independent School District =

School district in Texas

Coordinates: 31.7629°N 96.8802°W

The Mount Calm Independent School District is a public school district based in Mount Calm, Texas, United States. Located mostly in Hill County, a portion of the district extends into Limestone County.

== Schools ==
Mount Calm ISD has one campus with two buildings. Mount Calm Elementary serves students in prekindergarten through grade eight. Mount Calm High School serves students in grades nine through 12. In an election held on November 3, 2009, voters in the district approved a $1.5 million bond issue that called for the construction of a new high school building. Of the 195 votes cast, 110 (56.4%) were in favor of the measure, with 85 (43.6%) opposed. Before the new high school was built, students attended high school in one of three neighboring districts - Hubbard, Penelope, or Axtell.

== Academic achievement ==
In 2009, the school district was rated "academically acceptable" by the Texas Education Agency.

== Special programs ==
=== Athletics ===
Mount Calm High School plays six-man football. The team is known as the Panthers.

== See also ==
- List of school districts in Texas
