= F44 =

F44 or F-44 may refer to:

- F44 (classification), a para-athletics classification
- F-44 (Michigan county highway)
- Athens Municipal Airport in Athens, Texas
- BMW 2 Series (F44), a compact car
- Brazilian frigate Independência (F-44), a Niterói-class frigate of the Brazilian Navy
- HMS Tenacious (F44), a T-class destroyer of the Royal Navy
- INS Tabar (F44), a Talwar-class frigate of the Indian Navy
- JP-5 jet fuel
- Route F44 (WMATA), a bus route operated by the Washington Metropolitan Area Transit Authority
