= Texas State Highway Spur 364 =

State highway spur in Smith County, Texas, United States

State Highway Spur 364

Route information
- Maintained by TxDOT
- Length: 4.018 mi (6.466 km)
- Existed: June 26, 1962–present

Major junctions
- West end: SH 31 in Tyler
- FM 206 in Tyler
- East end: Loop 323 in Tyler

Location
- Country: United States
- State: Texas
- Counties: Smith

Highway system
- Highways in Texas; Interstate; US; State; Former; Toll; Loops; Spurs; FM/RM; Park; Rec
← Loop 363	→ Spur 365

Spur 364 is a 4.018-mile (6.466 km) state highway spur in western Tyler, Texas, United States, that connects Texas State Highway 31 (SH 31) with Texas State Highway Loop 323 (Loop 323).

== Route description ==
Spur 364's western terminus is at SH 31. The route travels south, southeast, and then east through western Tyler before at Loop 323.

Spur 364 serves as a reliever route for commuters and previously served truck traffic for the now-closed Goodyear tire manufacturing plant, which was located at the route's western terminus at SH 31.

== History ==
Spur 364 was designated along its current route on June 26, 1962.

== Major intersections ==
The entire route is in Tyler, Smith County.

mi	km	Destinations	Notes
0.000	0.000	SH 31 – Athens, Tyler	Western terminus; T intersection
0.5	0.80	FM 206 north (Old Chandler Hwy) – SH 31; CR 1134 west (Old Chandler Hwy) – SH 49, FM 26661, SH 31	FM 206 heads east–northeast and CR 1134 heads west–southwest from the intersection
1.7	2.7	Greenbriar Rd north – Spur 164, SH 31; Greenbriar Rd south – SH 155	Greenbriar Rd becomes Spur 164 about 0.5 miles (0.80 km) north of intersection
4.018	6.466	Loop 323 clockwise – SH 31, SH 64, SH 110, US 69; Loop 323 counter-clockwise – SH 155, US 69, SH 110, SH 64	Eastern terminus
4.018	6.466	Towne Park Dr east – Noble E. Young Park	Continuation east from eastern terminus
1.000 mi = 1.609 km; 1.000 km = 0.621 mi

== See also ==
- List of state highway spurs in Texas
