= Mount Calm, Texas =

- City
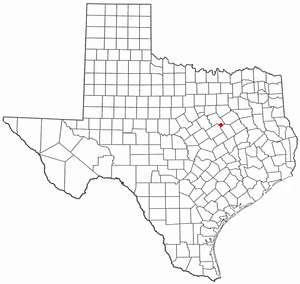
- Location of Mount Calm, Texas

- Coordinates: 31°45′28″N 96°52′55″W
- Country: United States
- State: Texas
- County: Hill

Area
  - Total: 0.84 sq mi (2.17 km^{2})
  - Land: 0.82 sq mi (2.13 km^{2})
  - Water: 0.015 sq mi (0.04 km^{2})
- Elevation: 607 ft (185 m)

Population (2020)
  - Total: 282
  - Density: 343/sq mi (132/km^{2})
- Time zone: UTC-6 (Central (CST))
  - Summer (DST): UTC-5 (CDT)
- ZIP code: 76673
- Area code: 254
- FIPS code: 48-49692
- GNIS feature ID: 2411177

Mount Calm is a city in Hill County, Texas, United States. Its population was 282 at the 2020 census.

== Geography ==
Mount Calm is located in southern Hill County in Central Texas. Texas State Highway 31 crosses the western corner of the town, leading northeast 8 miles (13 km) to Hubbard and southwest 21 miles (34 km) to Waco. Hillsboro, the Hill county seat, is 26 miles (42 km) to the northwest via local roads.

According to the United States Census Bureau, Mount Calm has a total area of 0.85 square miles (2.2 km^{2}), of which 0.02 sq mi (0.04 km^{2}), or 1.66%, is covered by water.

== Demographics ==
Historical population
Census	Pop.	Note	%±
1880	175		—
1910	575		—
1920	626		8.9%
1930	603		−3.7%
1940	525		−12.9%
1950	456		−13.1%
1960	379		−16.9%
1970	363		−4.2%
1980	393		8.3%
1990	303		−22.9%
2000	310		2.3%
2010	320		3.2%
2020	282		−11.9%
U.S. Decennial Census; 2020 Census

=== 2020 census ===
As of the 2020 census, Mount Calm had a population of 282. The median age was 36.0 years. 26.2% of residents were under the age of 18 and 17.7% of residents were 65 years of age or older. For every 100 females there were 90.5 males, and for every 100 females age 18 and over there were 87.4 males age 18 and over.

0.0% of residents lived in urban areas, while 100.0% lived in rural areas.

There were 102 households in Mount Calm, of which 34.3% had children under the age of 18 living in them. Of all households, 47.1% were married-couple households, 14.7% were households with a male householder and no spouse or partner present, and 31.4% were households with a female householder and no spouse or partner present. About 24.5% of all households were made up of individuals and 8.8% had someone living alone who was 65 years of age or older.

There were 129 housing units, of which 20.9% were vacant. The homeowner vacancy rate was 4.4% and the rental vacancy rate was 21.4%.

Racial composition as of the 2020 census
Race	Number	Percent
White	206	73.0%
Black or African American	24	8.5%
American Indian and Alaska Native	0	0.0%
Asian	0	0.0%
Native Hawaiian and Other Pacific Islander	0	0.0%
Some other race	28	9.9%
Two or more races	24	8.5%
Hispanic or Latino (of any race)	46	16.3%

=== 2000 census ===
As of the 2000 census, 310 people, 118 households, and 82 families resided in the town. The population density was 371.8 inhabitants per square mile (143.6/km^{2}). The 138 housing units had an average density of 165.5 per square mile (63.9/km^{2}). The racial makeup of the town was 74.52% White, 13.55% African American, 1.61% Native American, 1.61% Asian, 8.39% from other races, and 0.32% from two or more races. Hispanics or Latinos of any race were 11.29% of the population.

Of the 118 households, 28.8% had children under 18 living with them, 53.4% were married couples living together, 14.4% had a female householder with no husband present, and 30.5% were not families. About 25.4% of all households were made up of individuals, and 11.0% had someone living alone who was 65 or older. The average household size was 2.63 and the average family size was 3.23.

In the town, the age distribution was 30.3% under 18, 5.8% from 18 to 24, 23.5% from 25 to 44, 25.8% from 45 to 64, and 14.5% who were 65 or older. The median age was 38 years. For every 100 females, there were 86.7 males. For every 100 females 18 and over, there were 91.2 males.

The median income for a household in the town was $31,591, and for a family was $34,583. Males had a median income of $32,031 versus $18,571 for females. The per capita income for the town was $13,310. About 9.9% of families and 10.2% of the population were below the poverty line, including 14.1% of those under 18 and 3.2% of those 65 or over.

== Education ==
The town is served by the Mount Calm Independent School District.
