= Texas State Highway Loop 323 =

State highway in Texas

State Highway Loop 323

Route information
- Maintained by TxDOT
- Length: 19.7 mi (31.7 km)
- Existed: 1957–present

Major junctions
- CCW end: US 271
- US 69
- CW end: Loop 323 0.5 mi east of US 271

Location
- Country: United States
- State: Texas

Highway system
- Highways in Texas; Interstate; US; State; Former; Toll; Loops; Spurs; FM/RM; Park; Rec
← Loop 322	→ Loop 329

Loop 323 is a state highway loop in Texas in the United States. It is a 19.7-mile (31.7 km) highway circling the city of Tyler in Smith County.

== History ==
On November 20, 1951, Farm to Market Road 1803 (FM 1803) was established as a 4.8-mile (7.7 km) bypass from US 271 northeast of Tyler, to SH 64 east of Tyler. On October 29, 1953, FM 845, was created as another bypass around the north side of Tyler, covering 7.3 miles (11.7 km) from SH 31 to US 271 and the northern end of FM 1803. On October 26, 1954, the route of FM 845 was extended (but apparently not constructed) about 8.0 miles (12.9 km) south and east around Tyler and then northward to intersect with the southern terminus of FM 1803. On December 3, 1954, FM 845 was merged into FM 1803, so that the route, once completely constructed, would have a single highway designation.

On October 30, 1957, with its southern portion now under construction, FM 1803 was redesignated as Loop 323. The southern portion was to be designated as Loop 323 upon completion, while the northern portion — the original segments of the old FM 845 and FM 1803 — were resigned to coincide with the release of the 1958 official state highway map. Since the 1957 redesignation, no further routing changes to Loop 323 have been made.

== Route description ==
The northern terminus of Loop 323 is at US 271 and SH 155 northeast of Tyler. From there, Loop 323 travels south, intersecting its own "southern" terminus after 0.6 miles (0.97 km). Continuing south, it intersects SH 31, Loop 124 and SH 64 on the east side of Tyler; then, traveling southwest, it crosses SH 110. Shifting to a westward direction, it crosses US 69 and FM 2493 south of town, and SH 155 southwest of Tyler. Now heading north, it intersects with Spur 364 and crosses SH 31, SH 64, and SH 110 for the second time each, before turning northeast and intersecting US 69 again. Approaching northeastern Tyler, Loop 323 crosses US 271 0.7 miles (1.1 km) southwest of their previous intersection, and continues east another 0.5 miles (0.80 km) where it ends at its intersection with itself.

== Junction list ==
The entire route is in Smith County.

Location	mi	km	Destinations	Notes
Tyler	0.0	0.0	US 271 / SH 155 – Big Sandy, Gladewater, Downtown	access to UT Health Tyler
Tyler	0.5	0.80	To US 271 north / SH 155 north	
Tyler	2.9	4.7	FM 850 / FM 2767 (East Erwin Street)	
Tyler	3.2	5.1	SH 31 (East Front Street)	
Tyler	3.6	5.8	Loop 124 (Old Henderson Highway)	
Tyler	4.3	6.9	SH 64 (East Fifth Street)	
Tyler	5.6	9.0	Spur 248 (University Boulevard) – The University of Texas at Tyler	
Tyler	6.0	9.7	SH 110 (Troup Highway) – Whitehouse, Downtown	access to UT Health Tyler
Tyler	6.3	10.1	FM 756 (Paluxy Drive)	
Tyler	7.7	12.4	US 69 (Broadway Avenue) – Jacksonville, Tyler	
Tyler	9.0	14.5	FM 2493 (Old Jacksonville Highway)	
Tyler	9.8	15.8	SH 155 (Frankston Highway) – Palestine, Tyler	access to UT Health Tyler
Tyler	10.4	16.7	Spur 364 / Towne Park Drive	
Tyler	12.7	20.4	SH 31	
Tyler	13.3	21.4	SH 64 (West Erwin Street)	
Tyler	14.4	23.2	SH 110 (Van Highway) – Van, Downtown	
Tyler	15.6	25.1	US 69 (North Gentry Parkway) to I-20 west – Lindale, Tyler, Dallas	
	18.5	29.8	FM 14 – Hawkins, Tyler State Park	
1.000 mi = 1.609 km; 1.000 km = 0.621 mi

== See also ==
- Texas State Highway Loop 49
