= Caney City, Texas =

- Town
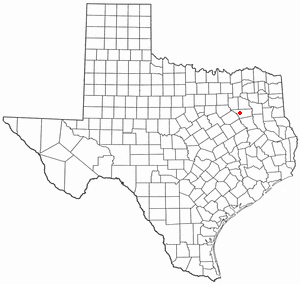
- Location of Caney City, Texas

- Coordinates: 32°12′35″N 96°02′17″W
- Country: United States
- State: Texas
- County: Henderson

Area
  - Total: 1.15 sq mi (2.98 km^{2})
  - Land: 1.15 sq mi (2.98 km^{2})
  - Water: 0 sq mi (0.00 km^{2})
- Elevation: 345 ft (105 m)

Population (2020)
  - Total: 187
  - Density: 163/sq mi (62.8/km^{2})
- Time zone: UTC-6 (Central (CST))
  - Summer (DST): UTC-5 (CDT)
- Area codes: 903, 430
- FIPS code: 48-12472
- GNIS feature ID: 2413158
- Website: cityofcaneycitytx.com

Caney City is a town in Henderson County, Texas, United States. The population was 187 at the 2020 census.

== Geography ==
Caney City is located in western Henderson County. It occupies a peninsula on the eastern side of Cedar Creek Reservoir, between two arms of the lake: Clear Creek to the north and Caney Creek to the south. The city of Log Cabin borders Caney City to the northeast. Texas State Highway 198 passes through the eastern side of the city, leading north 14 miles (23 km) to Mabank and south 3 miles (5 km) to Malakoff. Athens, the Henderson county seat, is 12 miles (19 km) east of Caney City.

According to the U.S. Census Bureau, the city has a total area of 1.2 square miles (3.0 km^{2}), all land.

== Demographics ==
Historical population
| Census | Pop. | Note | %± |
|---|---|---|---|
| 1970 | 117 | | — |
| 1980 | 312 | | 166.7% |
| 1990 | 170 | | −45.5% |
| 2000 | 236 | | 38.8% |
| 2010 | 217 | | −8.1% |
| 2020 | 187 | | −13.8% |
U.S. Decennial Census; 2020 Census

As of the census of 2000, there were 236 people, 99 households, and 70 families residing in the town. The population density was 202.8 inhabitants per square mile (78.3/km^{2}). There were 176 housing units at an average density of 151.3 units per square mile (58.4 units/km^{2}). The racial makeup of the town was 72.46% White, 25.85% African American, 1.27% from other races, and 0.42% from two or more races. Hispanic or Latino of any race were 0.85% of the population.

There were 99 households, out of which 24.2% had children under the age of 18 living with them, 60.6% were married couples living together, 6.1% had a female householder with no husband present, and 28.3% were non-families. 25.3% of all households were made up of individuals, and 8.1% had someone living alone who was 65 years of age or older. The average household size was 2.38 and the average family size was 2.77.

In the town, the population was spread out, with 20.8% under the age of 18, 2.5% from 18 to 24, 23.3% from 25 to 44, 33.1% from 45 to 64, and 20.3% who were 65 years of age or older. The median age was 46 years. For every 100 females, there were 105.2 males. For every 100 females age 18 and over, there were 114.9 males.

The median income for a household in the town was $9,079, and the median income for a family was $21,250. Males had a median income of $26,250 versus $22,778 for females. The per capita income for the town was $7,980. None of the families and 36.8% of the population were living below the poverty line, including no under eighteens and 16.9% of those over 64.

== Education ==
The town is served by the Malakoff Independent School District.
