= Murchison Independent School District =

School district in Texas

Murchison Independent School District is a public school district based in Murchison, Texas (USA).

Murchison ISD has one school that serves area students in grades Kindergarten through eight.

In 2009, the school district was rated "academically acceptable" by the Texas Education Agency.
