= Hubbard High School (Texas) =

Location
- 1803 West SH 31; Hubbard, Texas 76648-0218; United States; 31.855952°N 96.788069°W

Information
- School type: Public high school
- School district: Hubbard Independent School District
- Principal: Sunny Beseda
- Teaching staff: 23.99 (FTE)
- Grades: 9-12
- Enrollment: 208 (2023–2024)
- Student to teacher ratio: 8.67
- Colors: Black, Gold
- Athletics conference: UIL Class 2A
- Mascot: Jaguar
- Website: Hubbard High School

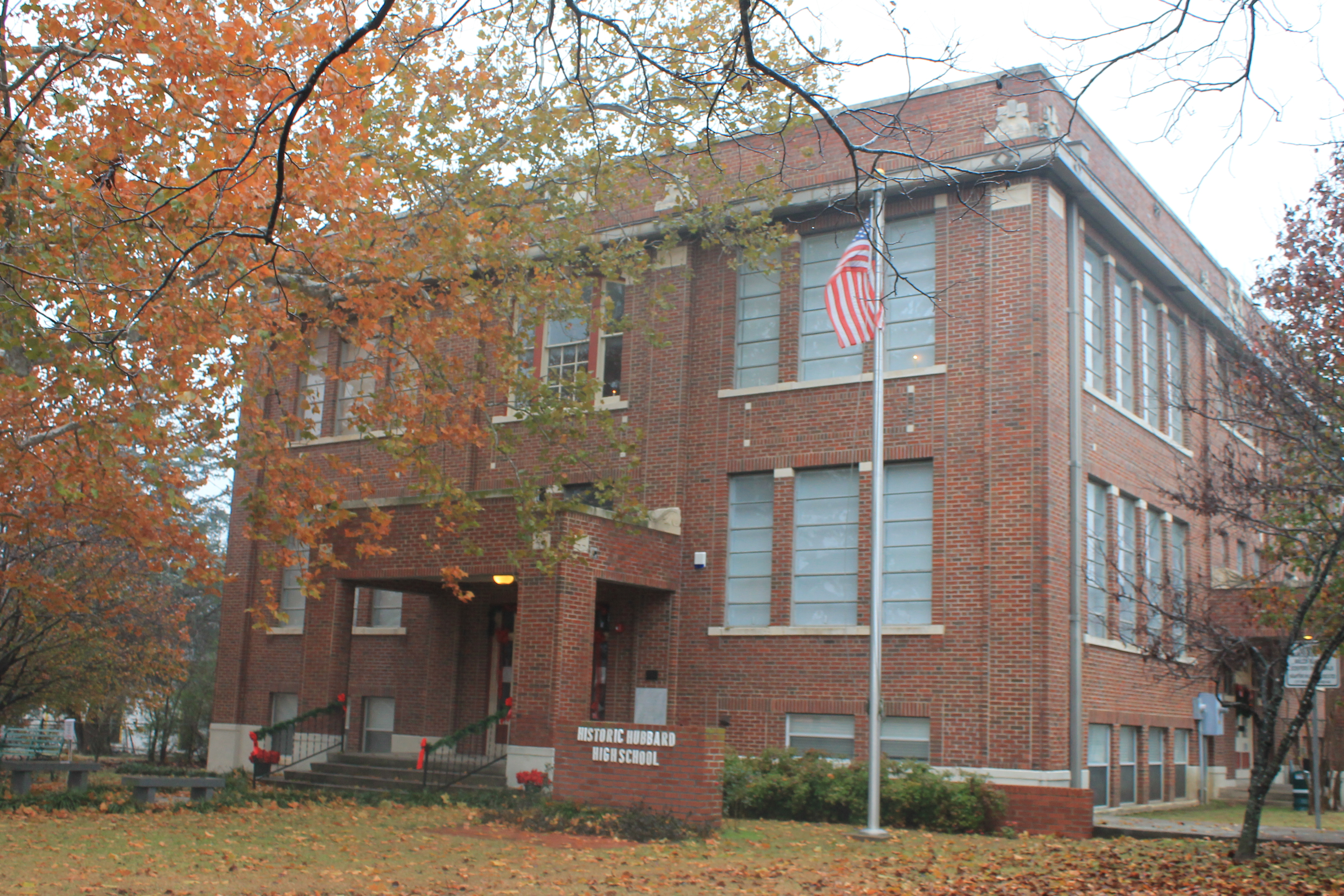
Former high school building, 1914-1978

Hubbard High School is a small 2A high school located in Hubbard, Texas (USA). It is part of the Hubbard Independent School District located in southeastern Hill County.

From 2020–2026, it has regularly served about 210 students each year.

== School ratings ==
The Texas Education Agency periodically rates school performance.

- In 2011, the school was rated "Academically Acceptable".
- In 2020, the school did not receive a rating due to the COVID-19 pandemic.
- In 2021, the school did not receive a rating.
- In 2022, the school received a "B" rating.
- In 2023, the school received a "C" rating.
- In 2024, the school received a "B" rating.
- In 2025, the school received a "B" rating.

== Athletics ==
The Hubbard Jaguars compete in the following sports:

- Baseball
- Basketball
- Football
- Golf
- Powerlifting
- Softball
- Tennis
- Track and Field
- Volleyball

== Activities ==
Students can also be involved in band, cheerleading, drill team, One Act Play, yearbook, student council, FCA, FFA, FCCLA, and UIL amongst many others.
