= Malakoff High School =

Coordinates: 32.1759°N 96.0343°W

Location
- 15201 FM 3062; Malakoff, Texas 75148-4800; United States

Information
- School type: Public high school
- School district: Malakoff Independent School District
- Principal: Martin Brumit
- Staff: 37.56 (FTE)
- Grades: 9-12
- Enrollment: 402 (2023–2024)
- Student to teacher ratio: 10.70
- Colors: Black & Gold
- Athletics conference: UIL Class 3A
- Mascot: Tiger
- Yearbook: Tiger
- Website: Malakoff High School

Malakoff High School is a public high school located in Malakoff, Texas (USA) and classified as a 3A school by the UIL. It is part of the Malakoff Independent School District located in western Henderson County. In 2015, the school was rated "Met Standard" by the Texas Education Agency.

== Athletics ==
The Malakoff Tigers compete in these sports -

Cross Country, Volleyball, Football, Basketball, Powerlifting, Golf, Tennis, Track, Softball & Baseball

=== State Champion ===
- Baseball
  - 2021 (3A)
- Football
  - 2023 (3A/D1)

=== State Finalist ===
- Volleyball
  - 1969 (1A)
- Football
  - 2018 (3A/D1), 2024 (3A/D1)
