= Hubbard Independent School District (Hill County, Texas) =

School district in Texas

Coordinates: 31.8340°N 96.8123°W

Location
- Hubbard, Texas ESC Region 12 United States

District information
- Type: Public
- Motto: Educating today for a better tomorrow!
- Grades: Prekindergarten through grade 12
- Superintendent: Dr. Wayne Guidry

Students and staff
- Athletic conference: UIL Class AA
- Colors: Black and gold

Other information
- Mascot: Jaguar
- Website: Hubbard ISD

Hubbard Independent School District is a public school district based in Hubbard, Texas, United States.

Located in Hill County, small portions of the district extend into Limestone and Navarro Counties.

In 2009, the school district was rated "academically acceptable" by the Texas Education Agency.

== Schools ==
- Hubbard High School (grades 9-12)
- Hubbard Middle School (grades 6-8)
- Hubbard Elementary School (prekindergarten-grade 5)
