= Log Cabin, Texas =

- City
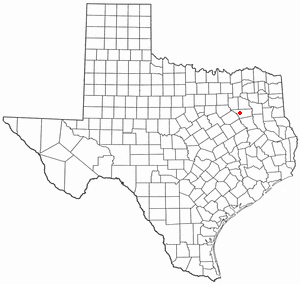
- Location of Log Cabin, Texas

- Coordinates: 32°13′23″N 96°01′20″W
- Country: United States
- State: Texas
- County: Henderson

Area
  - Total: 1.05 sq mi (2.73 km^{2})
  - Land: 1.05 sq mi (2.71 km^{2})
  - Water: 0.0077 sq mi (0.02 km^{2})
- Elevation: 374 ft (114 m)

Population (2020)
  - Total: 678
  - Density: 648/sq mi (250/km^{2})
- Time zone: UTC-6 (Central (CST))
  - Summer (DST): UTC-5 (CDT)
- ZIP code: 75148
- Area codes: 903,430
- FIPS code: 48-43354
- GNIS feature ID: 2410855
- Website: cityoflogcabin.com

Log Cabin is a city in Henderson County, Texas, United States. Its population was 678 at the 2020 census.

== Geography ==
Log Cabin is located in western Henderson County and bordered to the south by Caney City. Texas State Highway 198 passes through the west side of Log Cabin, leading northwest 14 miles (23 km) to Mabank and south 4 miles (6 km) to Malakoff. Athens, the Henderson county seat, is 13 miles (21 km) to the east by road.

According to the United States Census Bureau, Log Cabin has a total area of 1.0 square mile (2.7 km^{2}), of which 0.01 sq mi (0.02 km^{2}), or 0.86%, is covered by water. Log Cabin and Caney City are located on a peninsula at the southeast part of Cedar Creek Reservoir, with Clear Creek to the northwest and Caney Creek to the southeast. The reservoir drains west by an artificial channel to the Trinity River.

== Demographics ==
Historical population
Census	Pop.	Note	%±
1990	487		—
2000	733		50.5%
2010	714		−2.6%
2020	678		−5.0%
U.S. Decennial Census; 2020 Census

=== 2020 census ===
As of the 2020 census, Log Cabin had a population of 678. The median age was 44.5 years; 19.9% of residents were under 18 and 20.6% were 65 age or older. For every 100 females, there were 100.0 males, and for every 100 females 18 and over, there were 95.3 males 18 and over.

None of residents lived in urban areas, while 100.0% lived in rural areas.

Of the 263 households in Log Cabin, 29.3% had children under 18 living in them, 42.6% were married-couple households, 20.5% were households with a male householder and no spouse or partner present, and 25.1% were households with a female householder and no spouse or partner present. About 23.2% of all households were made up of individuals, and 11.0% had someone living alone who was 65 or older.

The city had 357 housing units, of which 26.3% were vacant. The homeowner vacancy rate was 4.5% and the rental vacancy rate was 7.1%.

Racial composition as of the 2020 census
Race	Number	Percentage
White	584	86.1%
Black or African American	9	1.3%
American Indian and Alaska Native	11	1.6%
Asian	2	0.3%
Native Hawaiian and other Pacific Islander	0	0.0%
Some other race	26	3.8%
Two or more races	46	6.8%
Hispanic or Latino (of any race)	43	6.3%

=== 2000 census ===
As of the 2000 census, 733 people, 303 households, and 206 families resided in the city. The population density was 691.3 inhabitants per square mile (266.9/km^{2}). The 548 housing units had an average density of 516.8 per square mile (199.5/km^{2}). The racial makeup of the city was 96.59% White, 1.09% African American, 0.82% Native American, 0.68% Asian, 0.55% from other races, and 0.27% from two or more races. Hispanics or Latinos of any race were 2.73% of the population.

Of the 303 households, 27.1% had children under 18 living with them, 54.5% were married couples living together, 11.6% had a female householder with no husband present, and 31.7% were not families. About 26.4% of all households were made up of individuals, and 12.2% had someone living alone who was 65 or older. The average household size was 2.42, and the average family size was 2.90.

In the city, the age distribution was 24.0% under 18, 5.9% from 18 to 24, 24.1% from 25 to 44, 25.2% from 45 to 64, and 20.7% who were 65 or older. The median age was 42 years. For every 100 females, there were 98.6 males. For every 100 females 18 and over, there were 98.9 males.

The median income in the city for a household was $24,438 and for a family was $28,125. Males had a median income of $17,188 versus $15,875 for females. The per capita income for the city was $14,364. About 23.6% of families and 28.4% of the population were below the poverty line, including 40.3% of those under 18 and 13.5% of those 65 or over.
