= Kerens Independent School District =

School district in Texas

Coordinates: 32.123°N 96.226°W

Kerens Independent School District is a public school district based in Kerens, Texas, (USA).

The district, which also serves the cities of Goodlow and Powell, is located in eastern Navarro County.

In 2009, the school district was rated "academically acceptable" by the Texas Education Agency.
