= Goodlow, Texas =

- City
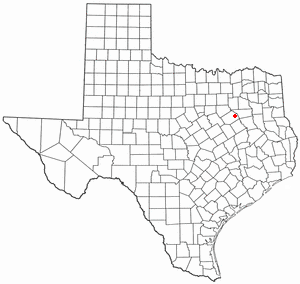
- Location of Goodlow, Texas

- Coordinates: 32°06′33″N 96°12′55″W
- Country: United States
- State: Texas
- County: Navarro

Area
  - Total: 1.03 sq mi (2.66 km^{2})
  - Land: 1.02 sq mi (2.65 km^{2})
  - Water: 0.0039 sq mi (0.01 km^{2})
- Elevation: 318 ft (97 m)

Population (2020)
  - Total: 178
  - Density: 174/sq mi (67.2/km^{2})
- Time zone: UTC-6 (Central (CST))
  - Summer (DST): UTC-5 (CDT)
- FIPS code: 48-30188
- GNIS feature ID: 2410620

Historical population
Census	Pop.	Note	%±
1970	345		—
1980	343		−0.6%
1990	319		−7.0%
2000	264		−17.2%
2010	200		−24.2%
2020	178		−11.0%
U.S. Decennial Census

Goodlow is a city in Navarro County, Texas, United States. Its population was 178 in the 2020 census.

== Geography ==
According to the United States Census Bureau, the city has a total area of 1.0 square mile (2.6 km^{2}), all land.

== History ==
According to the Texas State Historical Association, Goodlow "was established around 1900 on land belonging to Harry Goodlow. In the mid-1930s, the primarily black community had two churches, two schools, and a number of houses. After World War II, the Goodlow schools were consolidated with the Kerens schools, but the community continued to grow. Goodlow incorporated in 1978 after the city of Kerens refused to annex it."

== Demographics ==
=== Racial and ethnic composition ===
Goodlow city, Texas – Racial and ethnic composition Note: the US Census treats Hispanic/Latino as an ethnic category. This table excludes Latinos from the racial categories and assigns them to a separate category. Hispanics/Latinos may be of any race.
Race / Ethnicity (NH = Non-Hispanic)	Pop 2000	Pop 2010	Pop 2020	% 2000	% 2010	% 2020
White alone (NH)	9	13	26	3.41%	6.50%	14.61%
Black or African American alone (NH)	250	174	133	94.70%	87.00%	74.72%
Native American or Alaska Native alone (NH)	0	0	1	0.00%	0.00%	0.56%
Asian alone (NH)	0	0	0	0.00%	0.00%	0.00%
Native Hawaiian or Pacific Islander alone (NH)	0	0	0	0.00%	0.00%	0.00%
Other race alone (NH)	0	0	1	0.00%	0.00%	0.56%
Mixed race or Multiracial (NH)	0	1	10	0.00%	0.50%	5.62%
Hispanic or Latino (any race)	5	12	7	1.89%	6.00%	3.93%
Total	264	200	178	100.00%	100.00%	100.00%

=== 2020 census ===
As of the 2020 census, Goodlow had a population of 178. The median age was 48.5 years. 23.6% of residents were under the age of 18 and 20.2% of residents were 65 years of age or older. For every 100 females there were 89.4 males, and for every 100 females age 18 and over there were 83.8 males age 18 and over.

0.0% of residents lived in urban areas, while 100.0% lived in rural areas.

There were 69 households in Goodlow, of which 40.6% had children under the age of 18 living in them. Of all households, 39.1% were married-couple households, 26.1% were households with a male householder and no spouse or partner present, and 31.9% were households with a female householder and no spouse or partner present. About 23.2% of all households were made up of individuals and 10.1% had someone living alone who was 65 years of age or older.

There were 98 housing units, of which 29.6% were vacant. The homeowner vacancy rate was 0.0% and the rental vacancy rate was 24.0%.

Racial composition as of the 2020 census
Race	Number	Percent
White	27	15.2%
Black or African American	133	74.7%
American Indian and Alaska Native	1	0.6%
Asian	0	0.0%
Native Hawaiian and Other Pacific Islander	0	0.0%
Some other race	1	0.6%
Two or more races	16	9.0%

=== 2000 census ===
Of the 99 households, 33.3% had children under 18 living with them, 30.3% were married couples living together, 36.4% had a female householder with no husband present, and 27.3% were not families. About 26.3% of all households were made up of individuals, and 15.2% had someone living alone who was 65 or older. The average household size was 2.67, and the average family size was 3.17.

The age distribution was 30.7% under 18, 9.1% from 18 to 24, 21.2% from 25 to 44, 23.5% from 45 to 64, and 15.5% who were 65 or older. The median age was 34 years. For every 100 females, there were 79.6 males. For every 100 females 18 and over, there were 66.4 males.

The median household income was $46,250. Males had a median income of $24,375 and females $12,039. The per capita income was $9,569. About 36.1% of families and 30.3% of the population were below the poverty line, including 33.3% of those under 18 and 30.6% of those 65 or over.

== Education ==
The City of Goodlow is served by the Kerens Independent School District.
