= Murchison, Texas =

- City
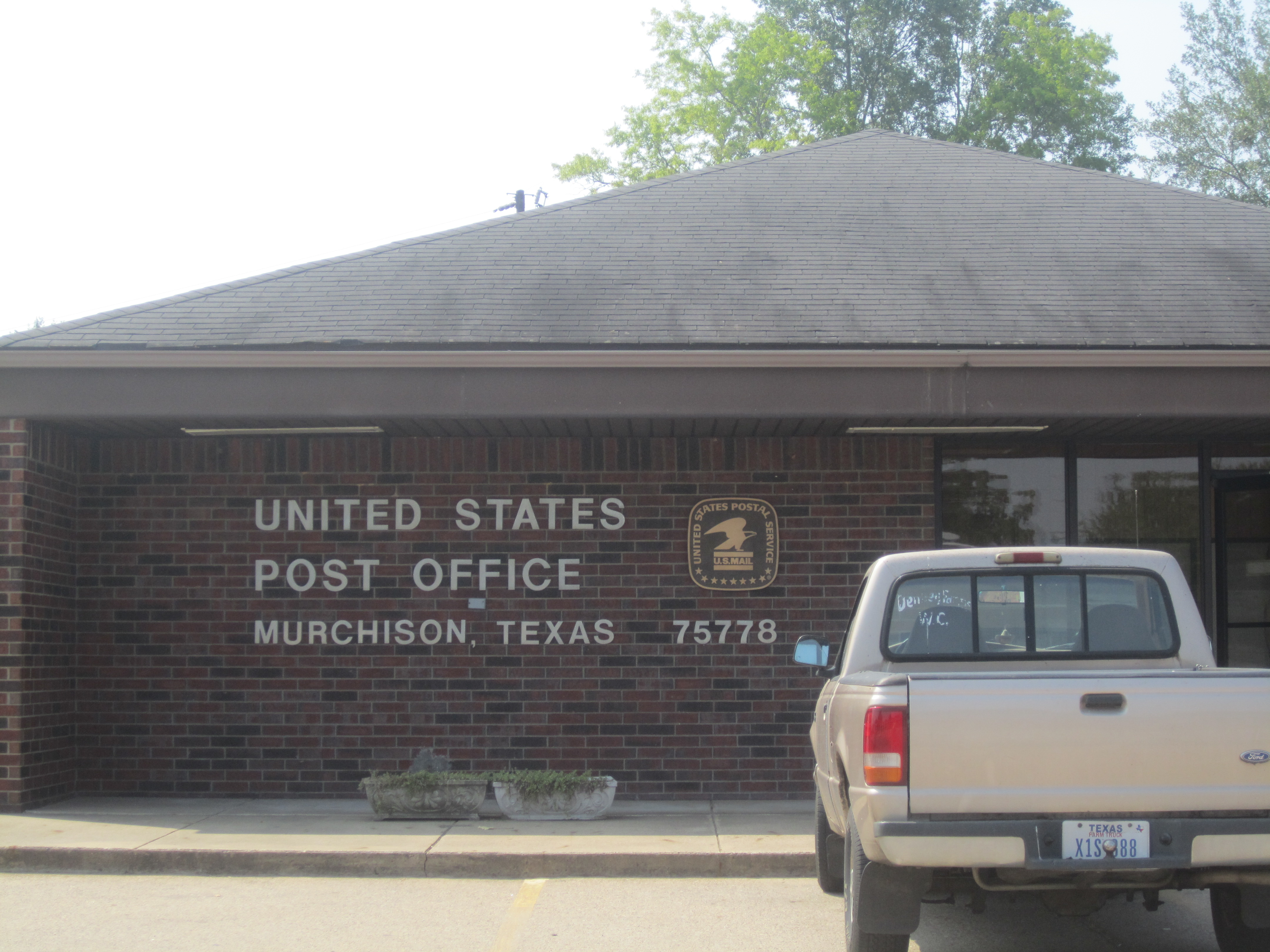
- U.S. Post Office in Murchison, Texas

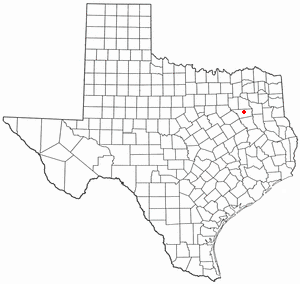
- Location of Murchison, Texas

- Coordinates: 32°16′37″N 95°45′02″W
- Country: United States
- State: Texas
- County: Henderson

Area
  - Total: 1.58 sq mi (4.09 km^{2})
  - Land: 1.58 sq mi (4.09 km^{2})
  - Water: 0 sq mi (0.00 km^{2})
- Elevation: 466 ft (142 m)

Population (2020)
  - Total: 516
  - Density: 327/sq mi (126/km^{2})
- Time zone: UTC-6 (Central (CST))
  - Summer (DST): UTC-5 (CDT)
- ZIP code: 75778
- Area codes: 903, 430
- FIPS code: 48-50076
- GNIS feature ID: 2411196
- Website: murchisontx.com

Murchison is a city in Henderson County, Texas, United States. The population was 516 at the 2020 census.

== Geography ==
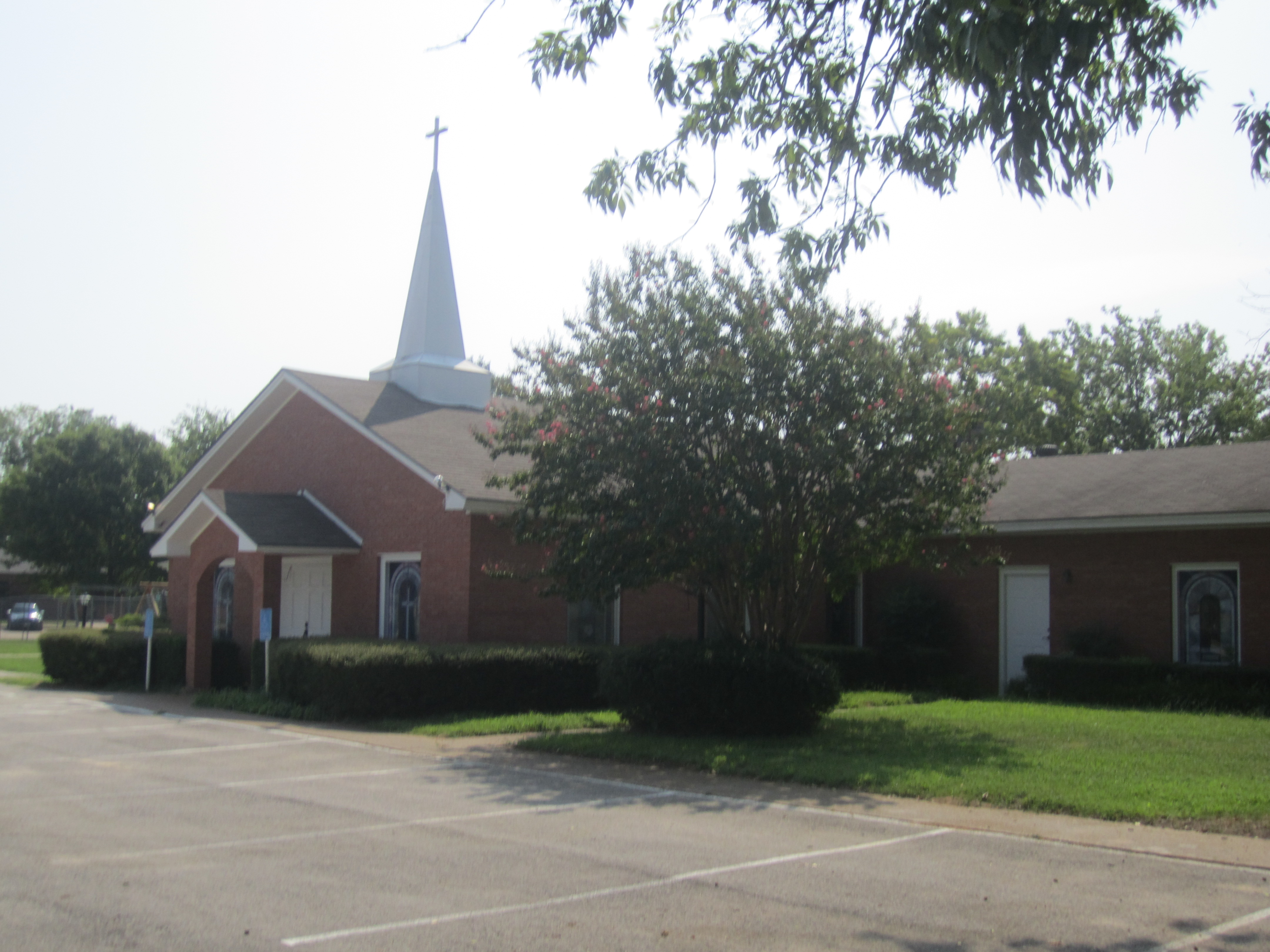
First United Methodist Church on Texas State Highway 31 in Murchison

Murchison is located northeast of the center of Henderson County. Texas State Highway 31 passes through the center of town, leading southwest 8 miles (13 km) to Athens, the county seat, and east 27 miles (43 km) to Tyler.

According to the United States Census Bureau, Murchison has a total area of 1.6 square miles (4.1 km^{2}), all land.

== Demographics ==
Historical population
Census	Pop.	Note	%±
1970	432		—
1980	513		18.8%
1990	510		−0.6%
2000	592		16.1%
2010	594		0.3%
2020	516		−13.1%
U.S. Decennial Census; 2020 Census

=== 2020 census ===
As of the 2020 census, Murchison had a population of 516. The median age was 42.3 years. 23.3% of residents were under the age of 18 and 20.2% of residents were 65 years of age or older. For every 100 females there were 96.9 males, and for every 100 females age 18 and over there were 97.0 males age 18 and over.

0.0% of residents lived in urban areas, while 100.0% lived in rural areas.

There were 206 households in Murchison, of which 35.0% had children under the age of 18 living in them. Of all households, 54.4% were married-couple households, 15.5% were households with a male householder and no spouse or partner present, and 22.3% were households with a female householder and no spouse or partner present. About 23.8% of all households were made up of individuals and 11.2% had someone living alone who was 65 years of age or older.

There were 233 housing units, of which 11.6% were vacant. The homeowner vacancy rate was 3.8% and the rental vacancy rate was 0.0%.

Racial composition as of the 2020 census
Race	Number	Percent
White	401	77.7%
Black or African American	12	2.3%
American Indian and Alaska Native	0	0.0%
Asian	8	1.6%
Native Hawaiian and Other Pacific Islander	0	0.0%
Some other race	50	9.7%
Two or more races	45	8.7%
Hispanic or Latino (of any race)	85	16.5%

=== 2000 census ===
At the 2000 census there were 592 people in 217 households, including 161 families, in the city. The population density was 373.9 inhabitants per square mile (144.4/km^{2}). There were 238 housing units at an average density of 150.3 per square mile (58.0/km^{2}). The racial makeup of the city was 94.93% White, 0.17% African American, 0.51% Native American, 0.17% Asian, 3.55% from other races, and 0.68% from two or more races. Hispanic or Latino of any race were 6.08%.

Of the 217 households 31.3% had children under the age of 18 living with them, 60.8% were married couples living together, 10.6% had a female householder with no husband present, and 25.8% were non-families. 21.7% of households were one person and 14.7% were one person aged 65 or older. The average household size was 2.73 and the average family size was 3.14.

The age distribution was 29.9% under the age of 18, 8.8% from 18 to 24, 23.3% from 25 to 44, 24.2% from 45 to 64, and 13.9% 65 or older. The median age was 35 years. For every 100 females, there were 87.9 males. For every 100 females age 18 and over, there were 82.0 males.

The median household income was $33,281 and the median family income was $36,071. Males had a median income of $30,938 versus $17,500 for females. The per capita income for the city was $14,986. About 15.7% of families and 20.0% of the population were below the poverty line, including 28.3% of those under age 18 and 23.5% of those age 65 or over.

== Education ==
Public education in the city of Murchison is provided by the Murchison Independent School District.
