= Hubbard, Texas =

- City
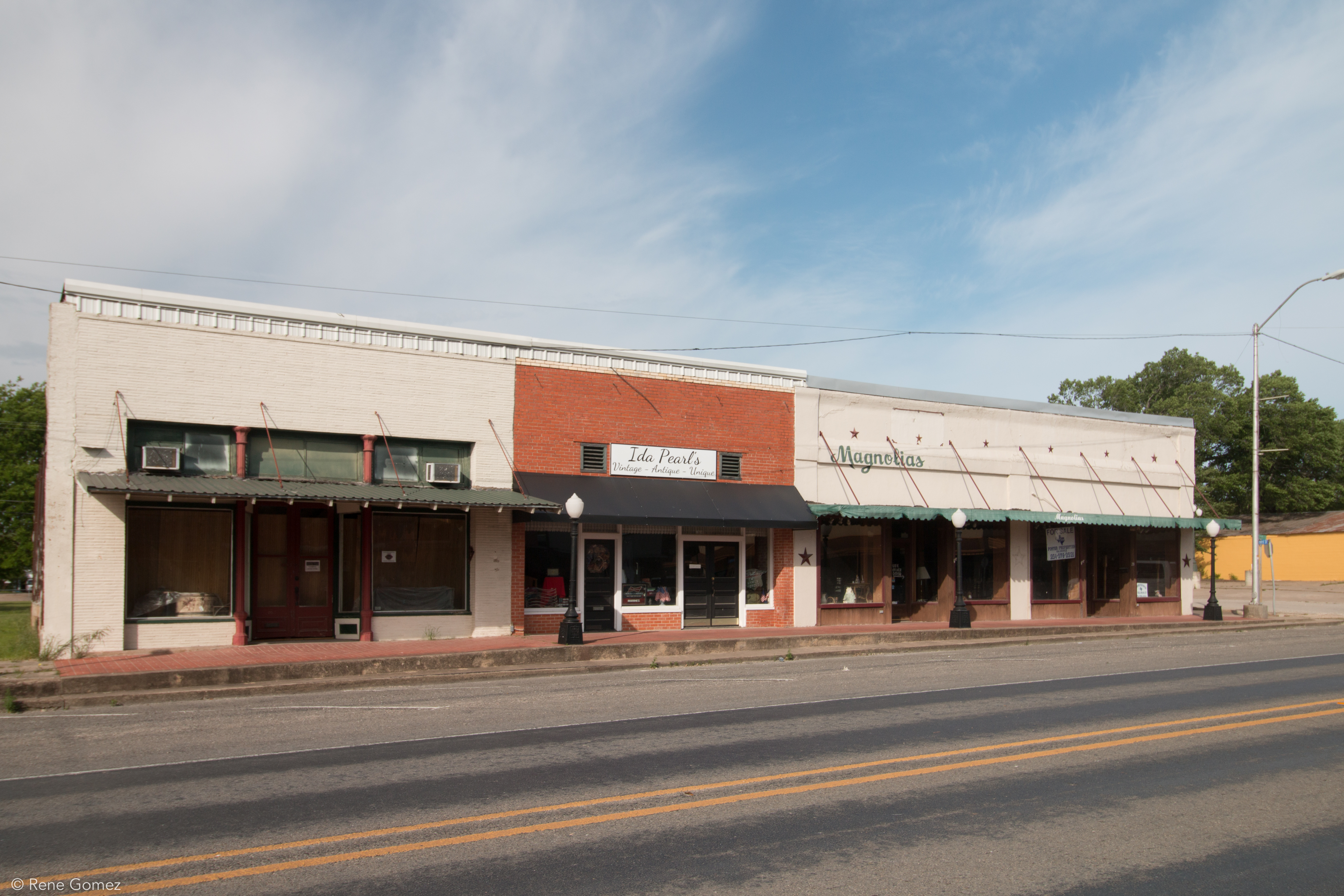
- Buildings in downtown Hubbard

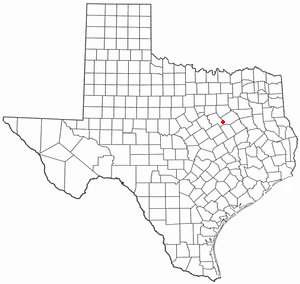
- Location of Hubbard, Texas

- Coordinates: 31°50′49″N 96°48′01″W
- Country: United States
- State: Texas
- County: Hill

Area
  - Total: 2.00 sq mi (5.17 km^{2})
  - Land: 1.96 sq mi (5.07 km^{2})
  - Water: 0.039 sq mi (0.10 km^{2})
- Elevation: 633 ft (193 m)

Population (2020)
  - Total: 1,394
  - Density: 712/sq mi (275/km^{2})
- Time zone: UTC-6 (Central (CST))
  - Summer (DST): UTC-5 (CDT)
- ZIP code: 76648
- Area code: 254
- FIPS code: 48-35180
- GNIS feature ID: 2410799
- Website: hubbardtx.gov

Hubbard is a city in Hill County, Texas, United States. It was named for Texas Governor Richard B. Hubbard. The city is 42 miles (68 km) northeast of Waco. Its population was 1,394 at the 2020 census, down from 1,423 at the 2010 census.

== History ==
Hubbard was named after Richard B. Hubbard, the 16th governor of Texas. He was on hand at the sales of the first town lots on August 11, 1881. The city was organized when the railroads were built through this section of the state. Its first bank was organized in 1881. In 1895, mineral water was discovered in Hubbard. This spawned several bath houses and a sanitarium. Hubbard's reputation as a health resort contributed to its population increase. On March 10, 1973, an F4 tornado destroyed about a third of Hubbard, including half of the business district, killing six people and injuring 77.

== Geography ==
Hubbard is located in southeastern Hill County. Texas State Highway 31 passes through the center of town, leading northeast 26 miles (42 km) to Corsicana and southwest 29 miles (47 km) to Waco. State Highway 171 crosses Highway 31 in the center of Hubbard, leading northwest 24 miles (39 km) to Hillsboro, the Hill county seat, and southeast 23 miles (37 km) to Mexia.

According to the United States Census Bureau, Hubbard has a total area of 2.0 square miles (5.2 km^{2}), of which 0.04 sq mi (0.1 km^{2}), or 1.92%, is covered by water.

== Demographics ==
Historical population
Census	Pop.	Note	%±
1890	894		—
1900	1,608		79.9%
1910	1,843		14.6%
1920	2,072		12.4%
1930	1,855		−10.5%
1940	1,871		0.9%
1950	1,768		−5.5%
1960	1,628		−7.9%
1970	1,572		−3.4%
1980	1,676		6.6%
1990	1,589		−5.2%
2000	1,586		−0.2%
2010	1,423		−10.3%
2020	1,394		−2.0%
U.S. Decennial Census

=== 2020 census ===
As of the 2020 census, Hubbard had a population of 1,394, 555 households, and 369 families. The median age was 40.2 years; 25.8% of residents were under 18 and 21.3% were 65 or older. For every 100 females, there were 95.8 males, and for every 100 females 18 and over, there were 87.5 males age 18 and over.

Racial composition as of the 2020 census
Race	Number	Percentage
White	969	69.5%
Black or African American	268	19.2%
American Indian and Alaska Native	14	1.0%
Asian	5	0.4%
Some other race	42	3.0%
Two or more races	96	6.9%
Hispanic or Latino (of any race)	149	10.7%

Of the 555 households in Hubbard, 30.1% had children under 18 living in them, 42.0% were married-couple households, 19.8% were households with a male householder and no spouse or partner present, and 33.0% were households with a female householder and no spouse or partner present. About 33.1% of all households were made up of individuals, and 16.0% had someone living alone who was 65 or older.

The city had 662 housing units, of which 16.2% were vacant. The homeowner vacancy rate was 6.6%, and the rental vacancy rate was 5.5%. As of the 2020 census, none of the residents lived in urban areas, while 100.0% lived in rural areas.

=== 2000 census ===
As of the 2000 census, 1,586 people, 625 households, and 406 families resided in the city. The population density was 800.8 inhabitants per square mile (309.2/km^{2}). The 715 housing units had an average density of 361.0 per square mile (139.4/km^{2}). The racial makeup of the city was 74.46% White, 20.81% African American, 0.25% Native American, 0.19% Asian, 1.39% from other races, and 2.90% from two or more races. Hispanics or Latinos of any race were 3.97% of the population.

Of the 625 households, 30.9% had children under 18 living with them, 44.6% were married couples living together, 17.1% had a female householder with no husband present, and 35.0% were not families. About 32.0% of all households were made up of individuals, and 20.0% had someone living alone who was 65 or older. The average household size was 2.42, and the average family size was 3.10.

In the city, the age distribution was 27.5% under 18, 6.8% from 18 to 24, 24.0% from 25 to 44, 19.9% from 45 to 64, and 21.9% who were 65 or older. The median age was 39 years. For every 100 females, there were 78.4 males. For every 100 females 18 and over, there were 73.7 males.

The median income in the city for a household was $25,950 and for a family was $34,083. Males had a median income of $30,795 versus $16,696 for females. The per capita income for the city was $15,311. About 20.4% of families and 24.5% of the population were below the poverty line, including 36.7% of those under 18 and 15.1% of those 65 or over.

== Education ==
The city is served by the Hubbard Independent School District.

== Notable people ==
- Mark English, illustrator and painter
- Samuel D. Johnson, Jr., federal judge
- J. Frank Norris, fundamentalist Baptist pastor
- Ron Shanklin, NFL wide receiver
- Tris Speaker, baseball Hall of Famer

== Photo gallery ==
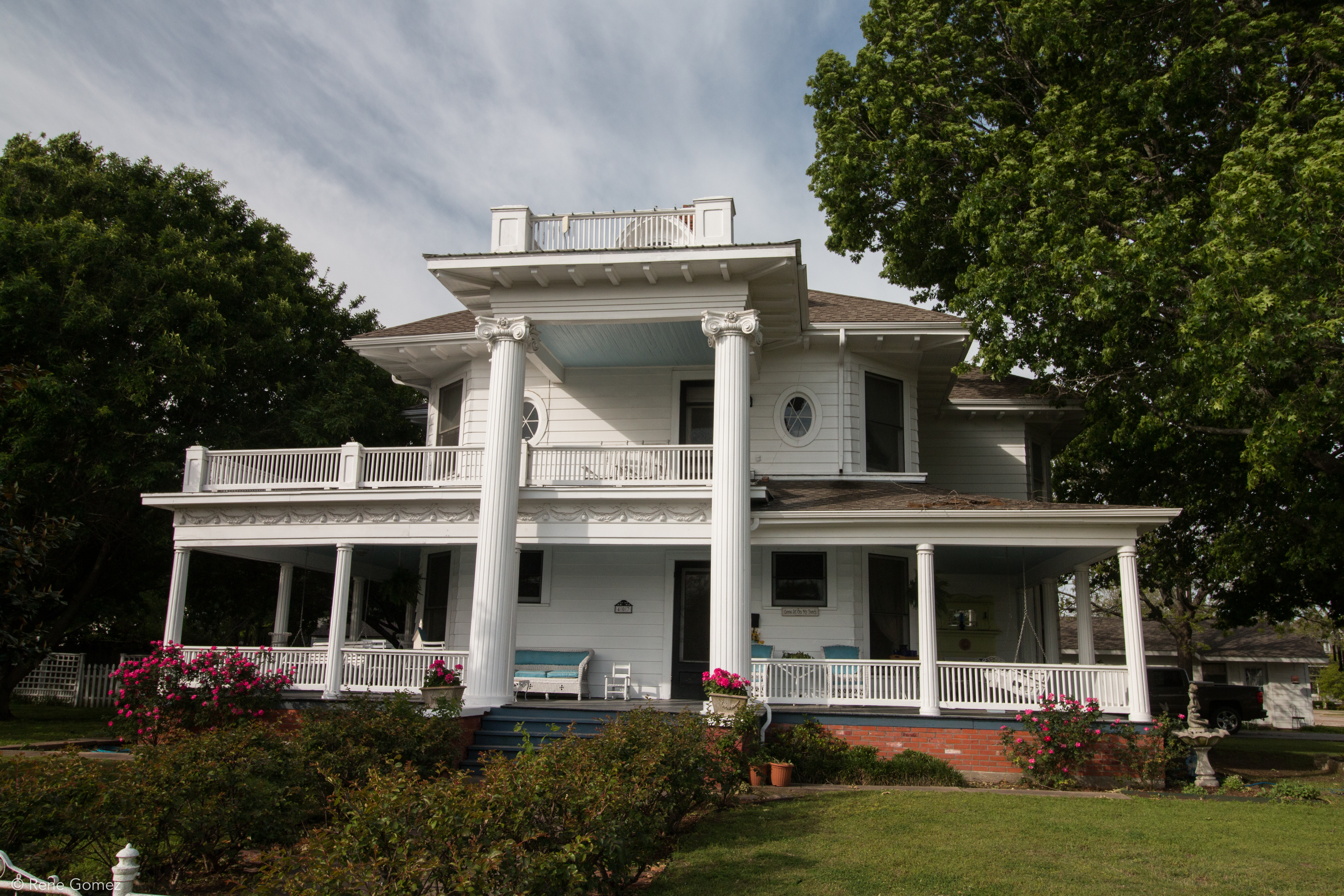
Wood-Taylor House

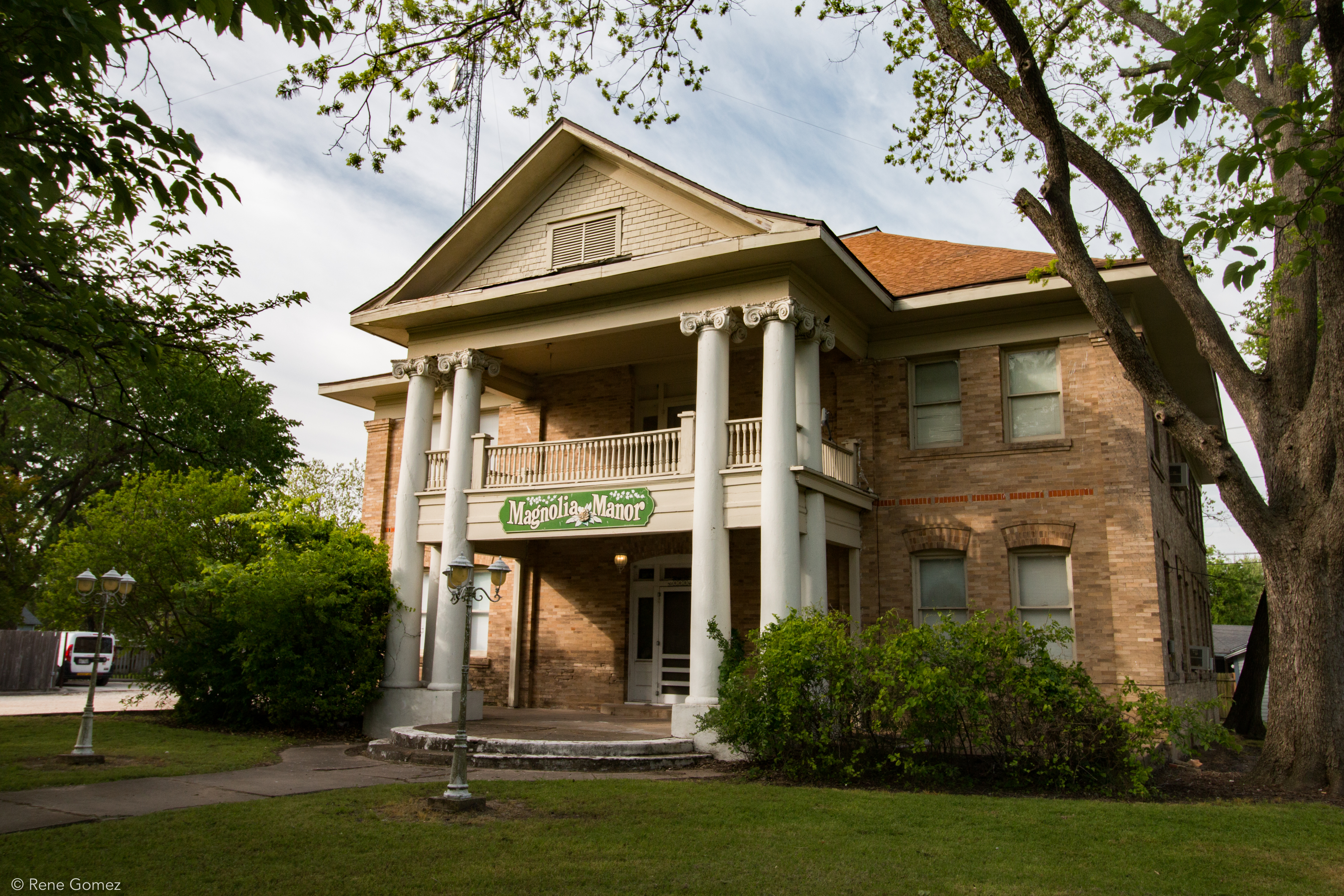
Hot Well Sanatorium

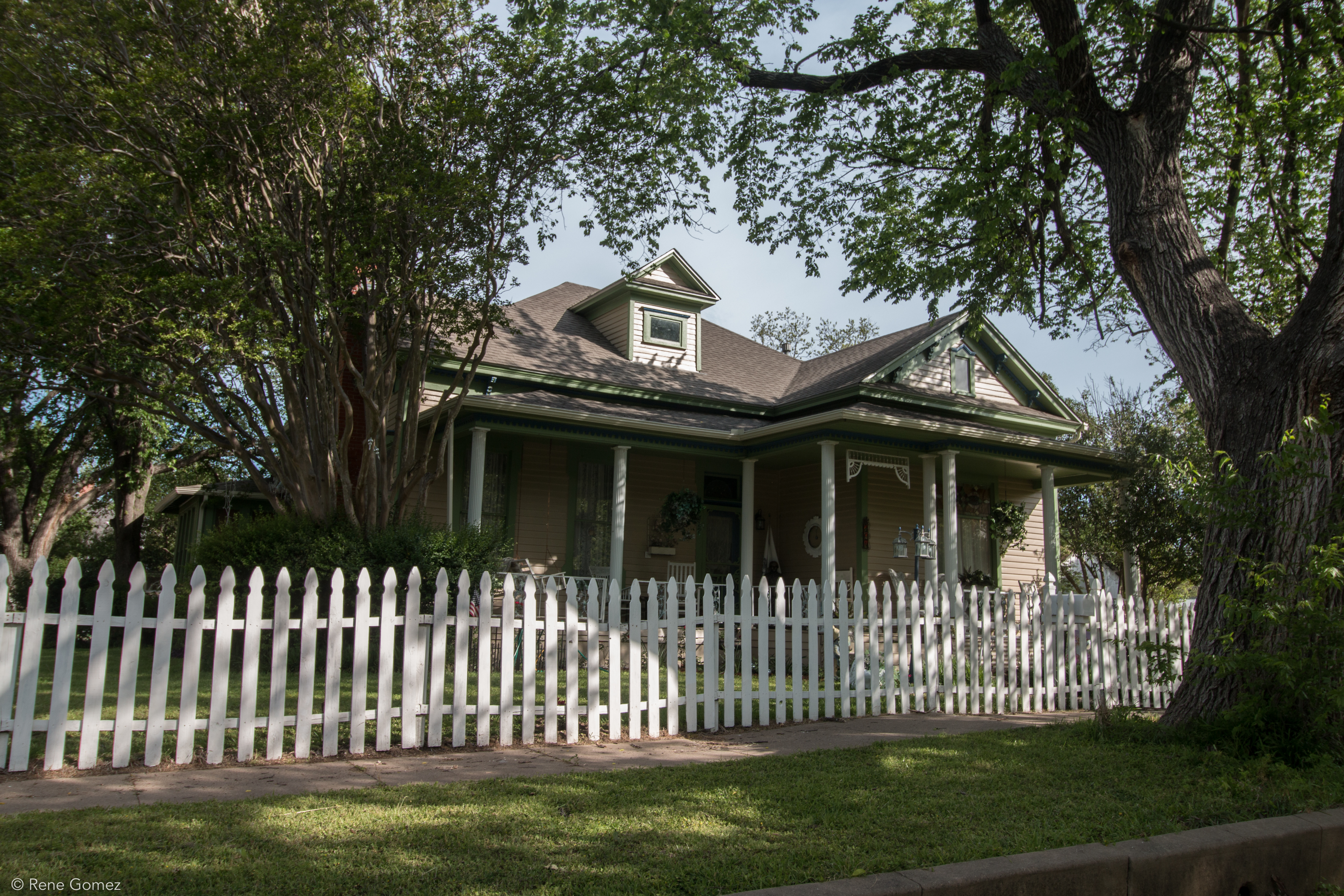
Onstott-Scott-Hill House

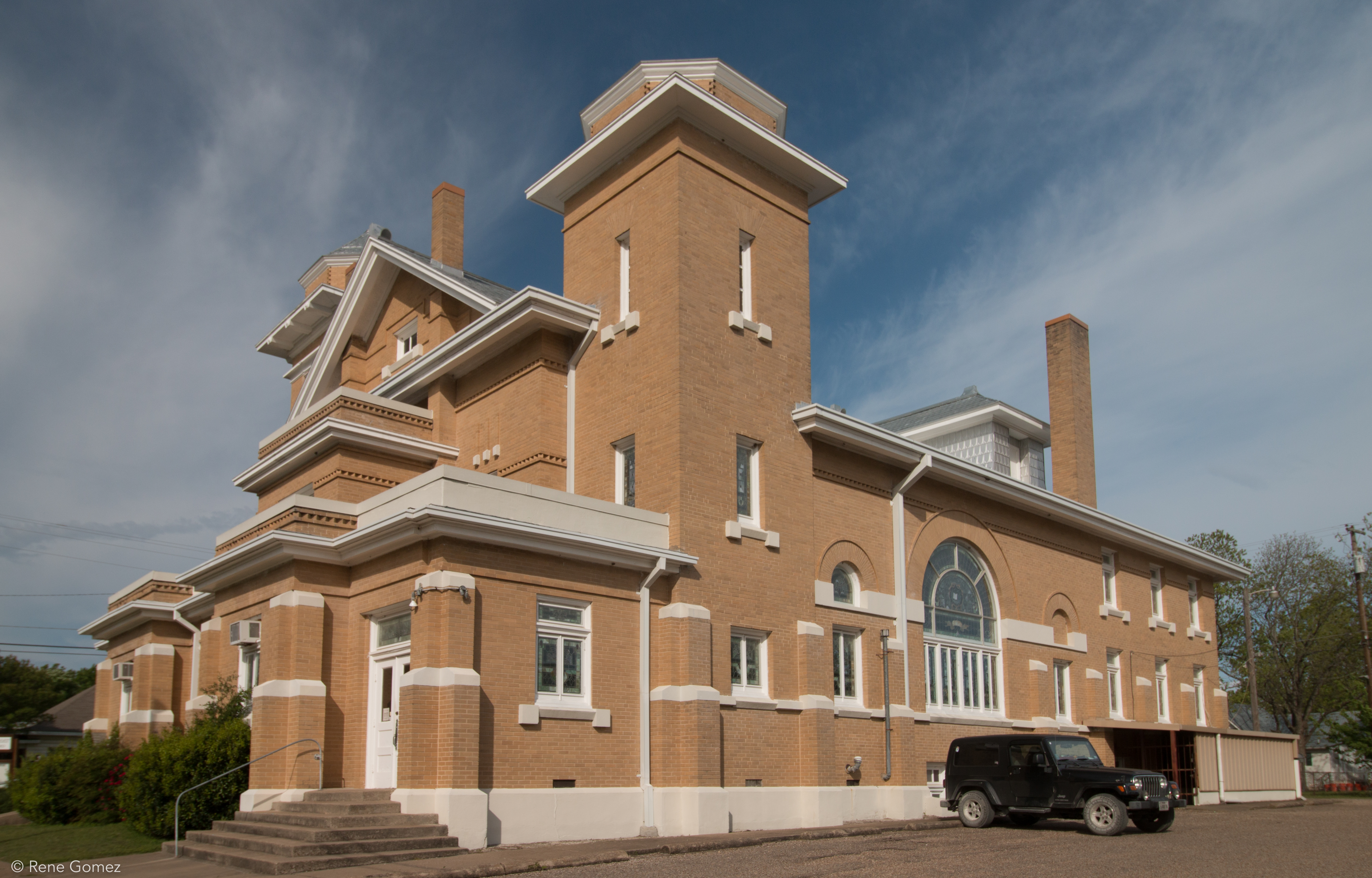
First United Methodist Church

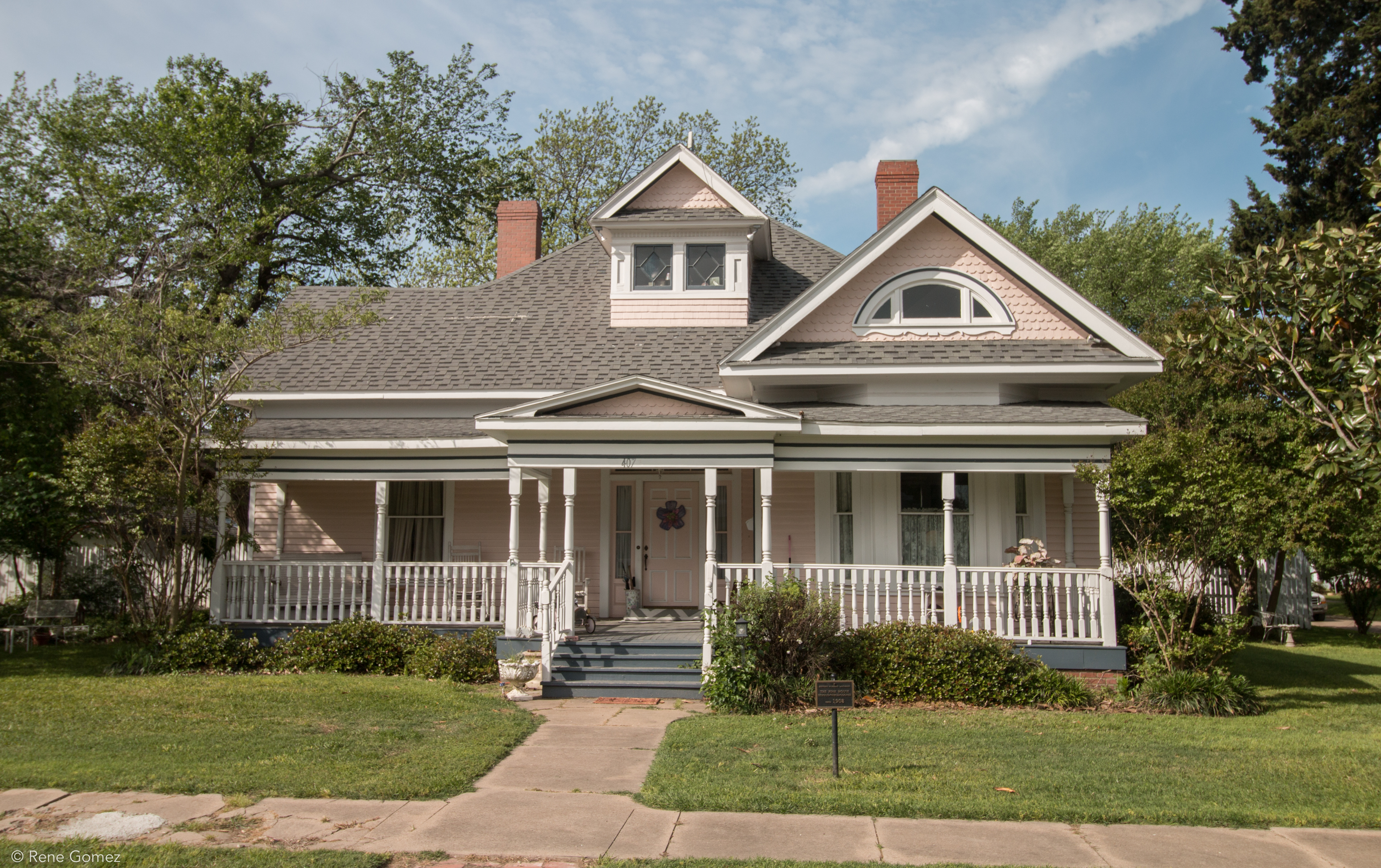
Stroud-Niece-Copper House

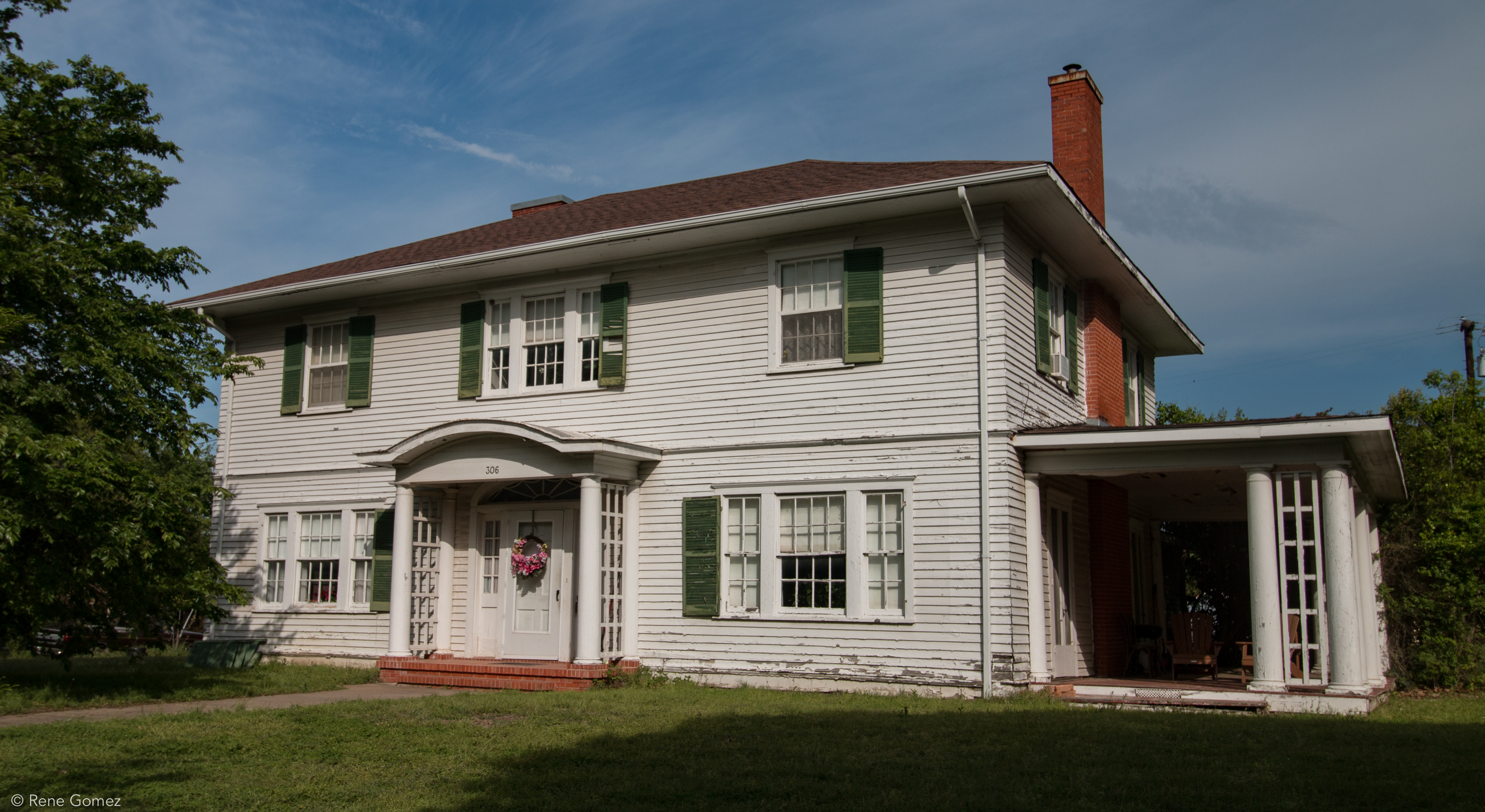
Liberty Hall

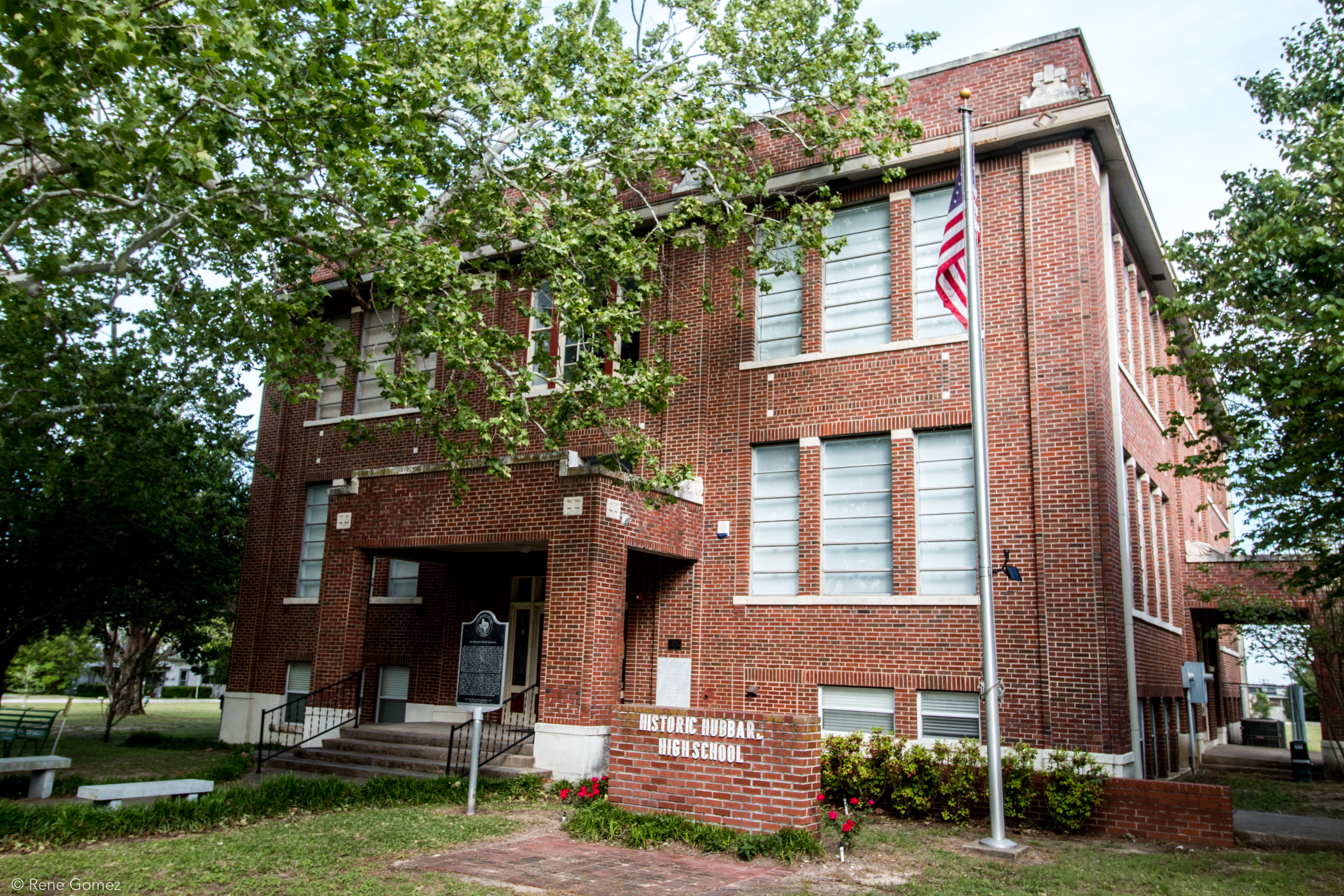
Hubbard High School

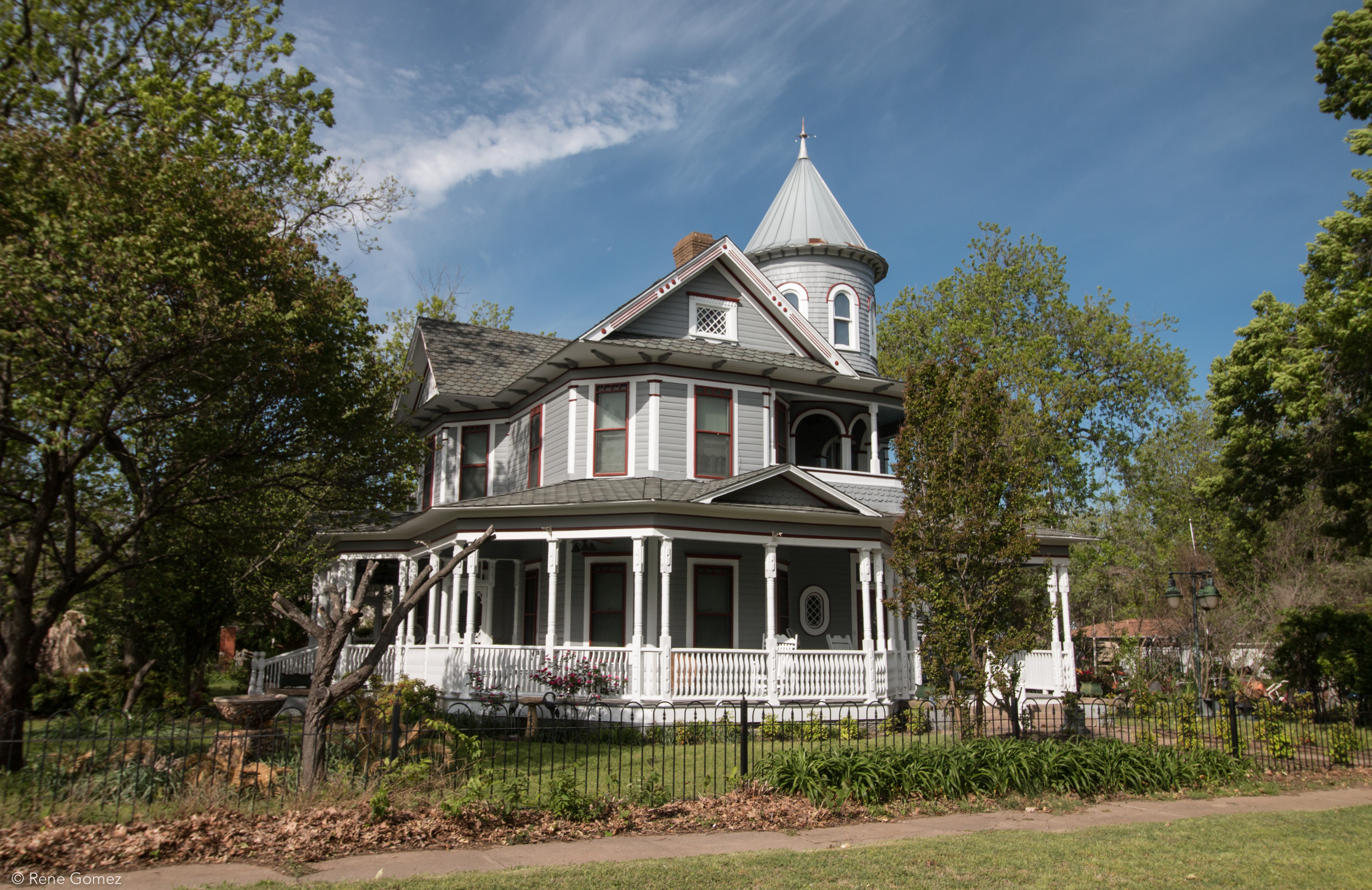
Wilkes-Niece-Barnett House

== See also ==
- List of cities in Texas
