= Kerens, Texas =

- City
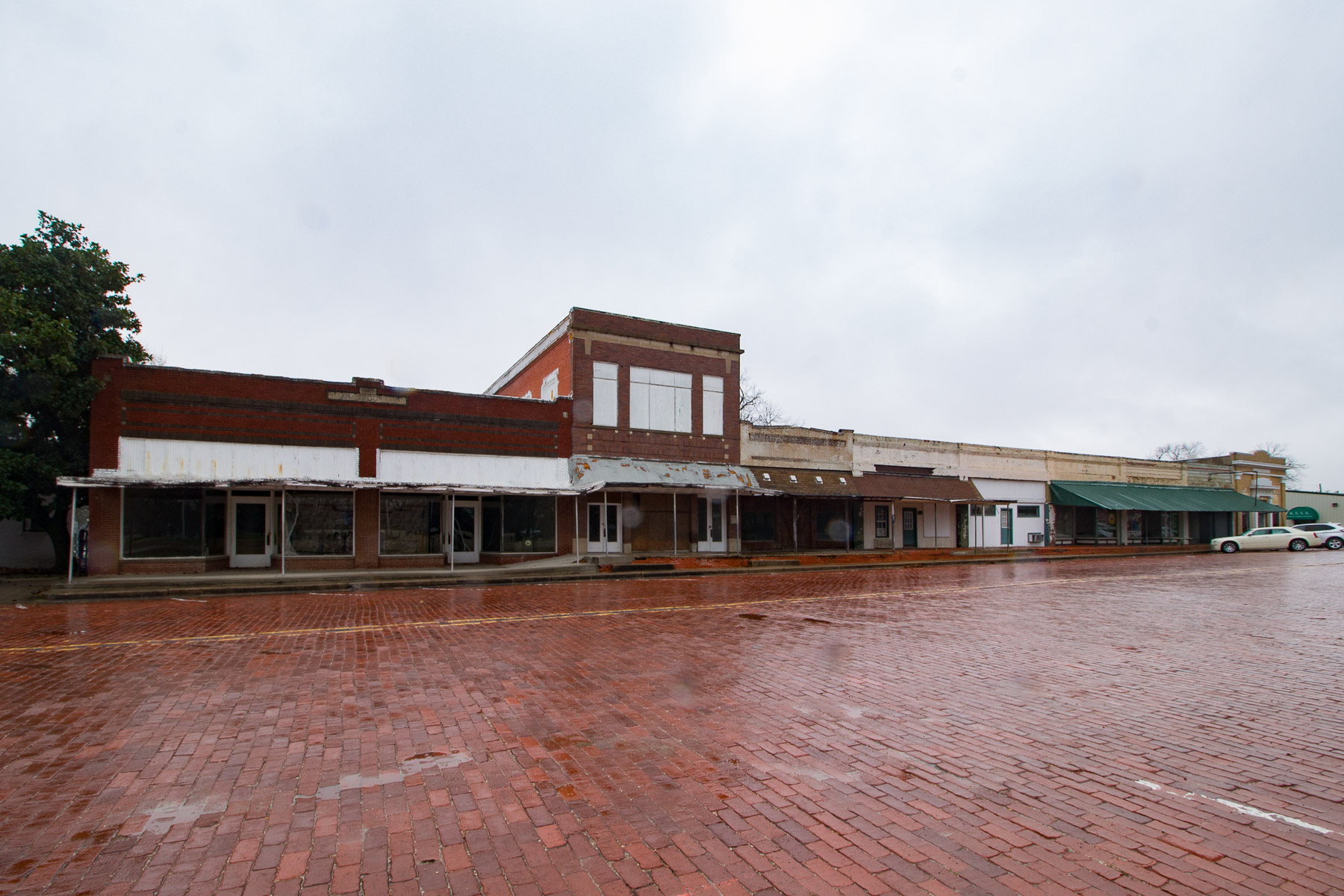
- Downtown Kerens
- Motto: Birthplace Of Big Tex
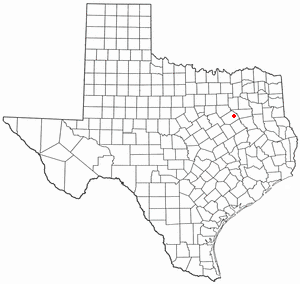
- Location of Kerens, Texas

- Coordinates: 32°07′40″N 96°14′45″W
- Country: United States
- State: Texas
- County: Navarro

Area
  - Total: 2.50 sq mi (6.48 km^{2})
  - Land: 2.50 sq mi (6.48 km^{2})
  - Water: 0.0039 sq mi (0.01 km^{2})
- Elevation: 367 ft (112 m)

Population (2020)
  - Total: 1,505
  - Density: 602/sq mi (232/km^{2})
- Time zone: UTC-6 (Central (CST))
  - Summer (DST): UTC-5 (CDT)
- ZIP code: 75144
- Area code: 903/430
- FIPS code: 48-38992
- GNIS feature ID: 2410186
- Website: http://ci.kerens.tx.us/

Historical population
Census	Pop.	Note	%±
1900	735		—
1910	945		28.6%
1920	1,343		42.1%
1930	1,435		6.9%
1940	1,287		−10.3%
1950	1,198		−6.9%
1960	1,123		−6.3%
1970	1,446		28.8%
1980	1,582		9.4%
1990	1,702		7.6%
2000	1,681		−1.2%
2010	1,573		−6.4%
2020	1,505		−4.3%
U.S. Decennial Census

Kerens is a city in Navarro County, Texas, United States. The population was 1,505 at the 2020 census.

== History ==
Kerens was established in 1881 when the St. Louis Southwestern Railway of Texas was built through the county, according to the Texas Handbook of History, and was named for Judge Richard C. Kerens of St. Louis. The railroad bypassed the nearby settlement of Wadeville, and within a short time all of the businesses from Wadeville moved to the new town. By the mid-1890s, the handbook said, the town had three cotton gin-mills, four grocery stores, two hotels, two drug stores, a wagonmaker, and a weekly newspaper named the Navarro Blade.

Big Tex, the giant icon of the State Fair of Texas, had his beginnings in Kerens. In 1949, residents built a 49-foot-tall (15 m) Santa Claus constructed from iron drill casing and papier mache to help encourage holiday sales. In 1951, State Fair president R. L. Thornton purchased Santa's components for $750 and had Dallas artist Jack Bridges transform them into a cowboy for the annual fair.

== Geography ==
According to the United States Census Bureau, the city has a total area of 2.3 square miles (6.0 km^{2}), all land.

== Demographics ==
=== 2020 census ===
As of the 2020 census, Kerens had a population of 1,505 residents, 545 households, and 434 families residing in the city.

The median age was 39.4 years. 25.3% of residents were under the age of 18 and 19.5% of residents were 65 years of age or older. For every 100 females there were 95.7 males, and for every 100 females age 18 and over there were 94.1 males age 18 and over.

There were 545 households in Kerens, of which 31.4% had children under the age of 18 living in them. Of all households, 40.9% were married-couple households, 18.3% were households with a male householder and no spouse or partner present, and 36.5% were households with a female householder and no spouse or partner present. About 32.3% of all households were made up of individuals and 16.9% had someone living alone who was 65 years of age or older.

There were 677 housing units, of which 19.5% were vacant. The homeowner vacancy rate was 3.2% and the rental vacancy rate was 11.3%.

0.0% of residents lived in urban areas, while 100.0% lived in rural areas.

Racial composition as of the 2020 census
Race	Number	Percent
White	852	56.6%
Black or African American	341	22.7%
American Indian and Alaska Native	4	0.3%
Asian	8	0.5%
Native Hawaiian and Other Pacific Islander	6	0.4%
Some other race	161	10.7%
Two or more races	133	8.8%
Hispanic or Latino (of any race)	228	15.1%

=== 2000 census ===
As of the census of 2000, there were 1,681 people, 682 households, and 448 families residing in the city. The population density was 720.4 inhabitants per square mile (278.1/km^{2}). There were 750 housing units at an average density of 321.4 per square mile (124.1/km^{2}). The racial makeup of the city was 70.14% White, 22.13% African American, 0.48% Native American, 0.06% Asian, 5.77% from other races, and 1.43% from two or more races. Hispanic or Latino of any race were 7.61% of the population.

There were 682 households, out of which 33.0% had children under the age of 18 living with them, 48.8% were married couples living together, 13.5% had a female householder with no husband present, and 34.2% were non-families. 31.8% of all households were made up of individuals, and 20.7% had someone living alone who was 65 years of age or older. The average household size was 2.46 and the average family size was 3.13.

In the city, the population was spread out, with 28.1% under the age of 18, 7.6% from 18 to 24, 26.5% from 25 to 44, 19.7% from 45 to 64, and 18.1% who were 65 years of age or older. The median age was 36 years. For every 100 females, there were 83.5 males.

The median income for a household in the city was $27,969, and the median income for a family was $36,719. Males had a median income of $26,683 versus $21,600 for females. The per capita income for the city was $13,000. About 13.3% of families and 19.5% of the population were below the poverty line, including 23.8% of those under age 18 and 18.9% of those age 65 or over.

== Education ==
The City of Kerens is served by the Kerens Independent School District.

== Climate ==
The climate in this area is characterized by hot, humid summers and generally mild to cool winters. According to the Köppen Climate Classification system, Kerens has a humid subtropical climate, abbreviated "Cfa" on climate maps.

== Notable person ==
- Tom Mechler, former state Republican chairman, formerly lived in Kerens, where he was engaged in the oil and gas business
