= Powell, Texas =

- Town
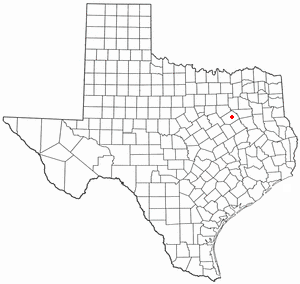
- Location of Powell, Texas

- Coordinates: 32°07′26″N 96°20′10″W
- Country: United States
- State: Texas
- County: Navarro

Area
  - Total: 1.21 sq mi (3.13 km^{2})
  - Land: 1.21 sq mi (3.13 km^{2})
  - Water: 0 sq mi (0.00 km^{2})
- Elevation: 377 ft (115 m)

Population (2020)
  - Total: 99
  - Density: 82/sq mi (32/km^{2})
- Time zone: UTC-6 (Central (CST))
  - Summer (DST): UTC-5 (CDT)
- ZIP code: 75153
- Area codes: 903, 430
- FIPS code: 48-59168
- GNIS feature ID: 2412504

Powell is a town in Navarro County, Texas, United States. The population was 99 at the 2020 census.

== Demographics ==
Historical population
Census	Pop.	Note	%±
1970	121		—
1980	111		−8.3%
1990	101		−9.0%
2000	105		4.0%
2010	136		29.5%
2020	99		−27.2%
U.S. Decennial Census; 2020 Census

As of the census of 2000, there were 105 people, 38 households, and 31 families residing in the town. The population density was 62.8 inhabitants per square mile (24.2/km^{2}). There were 38 housing units at an average density of 22.7 per square mile (8.8/km^{2}). The racial makeup of the town was 88.57% White, 3.81% African American, 6.67% from other races, and 0.95% from two or more races. Hispanic or Latino of any race were 10.48% of the population.

There were 38 households, out of which 36.8% had children under the age of 18 living with them, 65.8% were married couples living together, 10.5% had a female householder with no husband present, and 18.4% were non-families. 15.8% of all households were made up of individuals, and 15.8% had someone living alone who was 65 years of age or older. The average household size was 2.76 and the average family size was 3.06.

In the town, the population was spread out, with 28.6% under the age of 18, 2.9% from 18 to 24, 25.7% from 25 to 44, 21.0% from 45 to 64, and 21.9% who were 65 years of age or older. The median age was 37 years. For every 100 females, there were 90.9 males. For every 100 females age 18 and over, there were 92.3 males.

The median income for a household in the town was $27,083, and the median income for a family was $34,583. Males had a median income of $33,125 versus $16,250 for females. The per capita income for the town was $16,611. There were 10.3% of families and 11.4% of the population living below the poverty line, including no under eighteens and 8.3% of those over 64.

== Education ==
The Town of Powell is served by the Kerens Independent School District.

== Geography ==
According to the United States Census Bureau, the town has a total area of 1.7 square miles (4.4 km^{2}), all land.

=== Climate ===
Climate is characterized by relatively high temperatures and evenly distributed precipitation throughout the year. The Köppen Climate Classification subtype for this climate is "Cfa". (Humid subtropical climate).

Climate data for Powell, Texas
Month	Jan	Feb	Mar	Apr	May	Jun	Jul	Aug	Sep	Oct	Nov	Dec	Year
Mean daily maximum °C (°F)	14 (57)	16 (61)	21 (70)	25 (77)	28 (83)	33 (91)	36 (96)	36 (96)	32 (90)	27 (80)	20 (68)	16 (60)	25 (77)
Mean daily minimum °C (°F)	2 (35)	3 (38)	7 (45)	12 (54)	17 (62)	21 (70)	23 (73)	23 (73)	19 (66)	13 (55)	7 (45)	3 (37)	13 (54)
Average precipitation mm (inches)	64 (2.5)	71 (2.8)	81 (3.2)	100 (4.0)	120 (4.8)	79 (3.1)	56 (2.2)	56 (2.2)	76 (3.0)	91 (3.6)	76 (3.0)	84 (3.3)	960 (37.8)
Source: Weatherbase
