= Athens Municipal Airport =

- IATA: none; ICAO: none; FAA LID: F44

Summary
- Airport type: Public
- Owner: City of Athens
- Operator: City of Athens
- Serves: Athens, Texas
- Elevation AMSL: 444 ft (135 m)
- Coordinates: 32°09′49″N 095°49′42″W

Map
- Location within Texas

Runways
| Direction | Length | | Surface |
| Direction | ft | m | Surface |
|---|---|---|---|
| 18/36 | 3,988 | 1,216 | Asphalt |

Statistics (2023)
- Aircraft operations: 11,725
- Based aircraft: 27
- Source: Federal Aviation Administration

Athens Municipal Airport is a city-owned public-use UNICOM airport located three nautical miles (6 km) southeast of the central business district of Athens, in Henderson County, Texas, United States. It is mostly used for general aviation.

It is home to the Athens Jet Center which sells aircraft services and aviation and jet fuels.

== Facilities and aircraft ==
Athens Municipal Airport has one asphalt paved runway: 18/36 measuring 3,988 by 60 feet (1,216 x 18 m)

For the 12-month period ending 7 September 2023, the airport had 11,725 aircraft operations, an average of 32 per day: 74% local general aviation, 25% transient general aviation, 1% military, and less than 1% air taxi. At that time there were 27 aircraft based at this airport: 19 single-engine, 4 multi-engine, and 4 jet.

== Incidents and accidents ==
- 11 July 2000: a Cessna T210J, aircraft registration N2244R, was destroyed after a steep nose-up climb and subsequent left-wing-low descent and crash immediately on takeoff from Athens Municipal. The pilot, who was the sole aircraft occupant, was killed. The National Transportation Safety Board (NTSB) attributed the accident to an inadvertent stall during the takeoff climb.
- 26 July 2008: a Cessna 172, registration N6257E, was badly damaged when it collided with trees immediately after takeoff. The pilot suffered minor injuries; one passenger suffered serious injuries and the second passenger suffered minor injuries. The pilot said that the engine had a history of losing power but ran well after the preflight inspection, and that it had lost engine power during the accident flight. The engine problems could not be duplicated in post-accident testing. Investigators found that the pilot did not hold a valid private pilot certificate nor a valid medical certificate. The NTSB attributed the accident to a partial loss of engine power for undetermined reasons, and the pilot's improper decision to initiate flight in an aircraft with suspected engine problems.
- 4 March 2009: A man who did not hold a pilot's certificate took off in a Beechcraft Bonanza A36, N5470V, and crashed in a wooded area about 2 mi (3.2 km) from the airport, suffering minor injuries and severely damaging the aircraft. A ground witness saw the man enter the aircraft; believing the entry was not authorized, he telephoned the aircraft owner, who notified police. The accident pilot was in turn arrested by police when he returned to the airport to retrieve his car. The NTSB attributed the accident to the non-certificated pilot's failure to maintain aircraft control.
- 13 September 2014: a parked Cessna Citation I was destroyed in a mysterious nighttime ramp fire. Surveillance footage showed a man entering the jet before it erupted in flames; he was identified by a Bureau of Alcohol, Tobacco, Firearms, and Explosives (ATF) investigator as Raymond Fosdick, who owned a Beechcraft Bonanza seen at the airport on two earlier occasions. Fosdick behaved evasively during one visit, arousing the suspicion of a local aircraft shop owner, who took notes. The Cessna was owned by a corporation controlled by Theodore Robert (T.R.) Wright III, who had flown it to the airport. The ATF linked Wright to Fosdick through their highly publicized ditching of Wright's Beechcraft Baron in the Gulf of Mexico in 2012. The ATF found that both the Citation and the Baron had been insured for substantially more than their recent purchase prices, and a federal court deemed both the crash and fire to be part of an insurance fraud scheme organized by Wright. The two men and two associates were convicted in 2017 of conspiracy to commit arson and conspiracy to commit wire fraud, and in 2018, Wright and Fosdick were sentenced to federal prison.

== See also ==
- List of airports in Texas
