= Malakoff, Texas =

- City
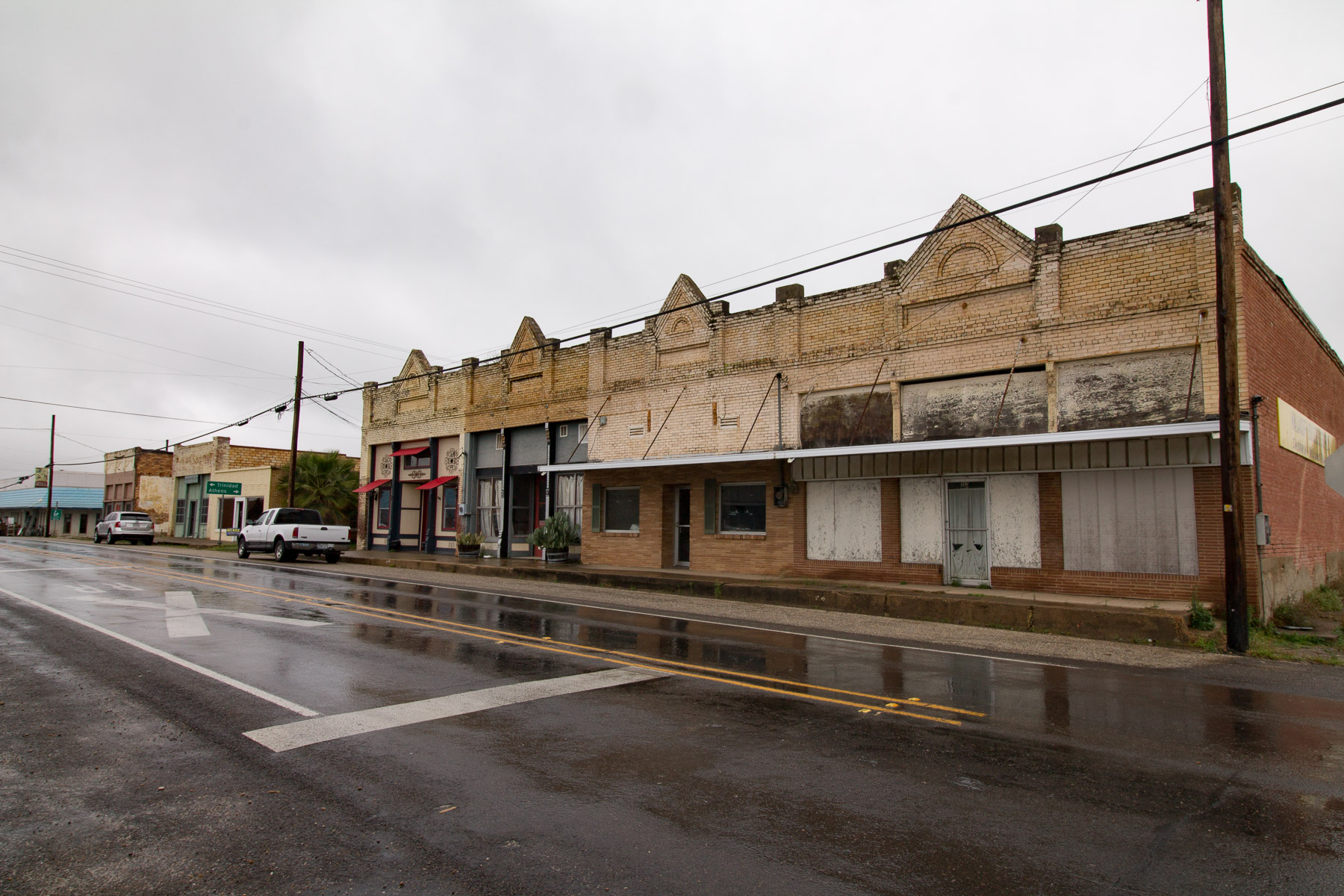
- Downtown Malakoff

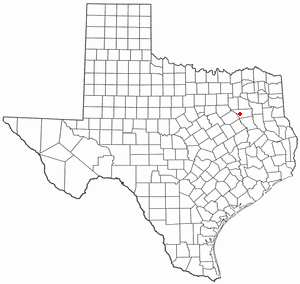
- Location of Malakoff, Texas

- Coordinates: 32°10′26″N 96°00′30″W
- Country: United States
- State: Texas
- County: Henderson

Area
  - Total: 2.88 sq mi (7.47 km^{2})
  - Land: 2.87 sq mi (7.43 km^{2})
  - Water: 0.015 sq mi (0.04 km^{2})
- Elevation: 361 ft (110 m)

Population (2020)
  - Total: 2,179
  - Density: 801.8/sq mi (309.58/km^{2})
- Time zone: UTC-6 (Central (CST))
  - Summer (DST): UTC-5 (CDT)
- ZIP code: 75148
- Area codes: 903, 430
- FIPS code: 48-46224
- GNIS feature ID: 2410912
- Website: cityofmalakoff.net

Malakoff is a city in Henderson County, Texas, United States. The population was 2,179 at the 2020 census. The city is named after a Russian fort of Malakoff (Malakhov kurgan), which played a pivotal role during the siege of Sevastopol during the Crimean War.

== History ==
The community was formerly known as "Caney Creek" and "Mitcham Chapel". An application for a named post office in 1854 under "Purdam" or "Mitcham" resulted in the current name, because the other names were already in use. In the 1920s coal mining became an important activity. The "Malakoff Man", a large prehistoric carved head found in the 1930s, resembles a carving of the Olmec culture.

== Geography ==
Malakoff is located in western Henderson County. Texas State Highway 31 runs through the center of the city, leading east 9 miles (14 km) to Athens and west 27 miles (43 km) to Corsicana. Texas State Highway 198 leads north from the center of Malakoff 17 miles (27 km) to Mabank.

According to the United States Census Bureau, Malakoff has a total area of 2.9 square miles (7.5 km^{2}), of which 0.02 square miles (0.04 km^{2}), or 0.50%, are water. The city is 3 miles (5 km) south of Cedar Creek Reservoir and is part of the Trinity River watershed.

== Demographics ==
Historical population
Census	Pop.	Note	%±
1950	1,286		—
1960	1,657		28.8%
1970	2,045		23.4%
1980	2,082		1.8%
1990	2,038		−2.1%
2000	2,257		10.7%
2010	2,324		3.0%
2020	2,179		−6.2%
U.S. Decennial Census

=== 2020 census ===
As of the 2020 census, Malakoff had a population of 2,179, 827 households, and 624 families. The median age was 39.1 years; 24.6% of residents were under the age of 18 and 17.1% of residents were 65 years of age or older. For every 100 females there were 87.0 males, and for every 100 females age 18 and over there were 86.6 males age 18 and over.

0.0% of residents lived in urban areas, while 100.0% lived in rural areas.

There were 827 households in Malakoff, of which 37.0% had children under the age of 18 living in them. Of all households, 37.2% were married-couple households, 20.9% were households with a male householder and no spouse or partner present, and 33.3% were households with a female householder and no spouse or partner present. About 29.6% of all households were made up of individuals and 13.1% had someone living alone who was 65 years of age or older.

There were 961 housing units, of which 13.9% were vacant. The homeowner vacancy rate was 1.4% and the rental vacancy rate was 11.3%.

Racial composition as of the 2020 census
Race	Number	Percent
White	1,294	59.4%
Black or African American	448	20.6%
American Indian and Alaska Native	20	0.9%
Asian	9	0.4%
Native Hawaiian and Other Pacific Islander	2	0.1%
Some other race	190	8.7%
Two or more races	216	9.9%
Hispanic or Latino (of any race)	430	19.7%

=== 2000 census ===
As of the 2000 census, there were 2,257 people, 874 households, and 566 families residing in the city. The population density was 804.4 inhabitants per square mile (310.6/km^{2}). There were 1,036 housing units at an average density of 369.2 per square mile (142.5/km^{2}). The racial makeup of the city was 72.49% White, 21.98% African American, 0.49% Native American, 0.13% Asian, 0.13% Pacific Islander, 3.46% from other races, and 1.33% from two or more races. Hispanic or Latino of any race were 10.32% of the population.

There were 874 households, out of which 33.3% had children under the age of 18 living with them, 42.8% were married couples living together, 18.5% had a female householder with no husband present, and 35.2% were non-families. 31.2% of all households were made up of individuals, and 16.2% had someone living alone who was 65 years of age or older. The average household size was 2.48 and the average family size was 3.09.

In the city, the population was spread out, with 28.3% under the age of 18, 8.9% from 18 to 24, 25.5% from 25 to 44, 18.7% from 45 to 64, and 18.7% who were 65 years of age or older. The median age was 36 years. For every 100 females, there were 84.1 males. For every 100 females age 18 and over, there were 77.8 males.

The median income for a household in the city was $24,022, and the median income for a family was $30,029. Males had a median income of $29,663 versus $22,228 for females. The per capita income for the city was $12,109. About 27.7% of families and 27.6% of the population were below the poverty line, including 33.5% of those under age 18 and 32.3% of those age 65 or over

== Education ==
Malakoff's students are served by Malakoff Independent School District. In 2014–2015, Malakoff ISD served more than 1,200 students.

== Climate ==
The climate in this area is characterized by hot, humid summers and generally mild to cool winters. According to the Köppen Climate Classification system, Malakoff has a humid subtropical climate, abbreviated "Cfa" on climate maps.
