= Sunrise Shores, Texas =

- Census-designated place
- Location within Texas Location within the United States
- Coordinates: 32°10′39″N 95°30′10″W
- Country: United States
- State: Texas
- County: Henderson

Area
  - Total: 0.55 sq mi (1.42 km^{2})
  - Land: 0.36 sq mi (0.93 km^{2})
  - Water: 0.19 sq mi (0.49 km^{2})
- Elevation: 361 ft (110 m)
- Time zone: UTC-6 (Central (CST))
  - Summer (DST): UTC-5 (CDT)
- ZIP Code: 75758 (Chandler)
- Area codes: 430, 903
- FIPS code: 48-71236
- GNIS feature ID: 2805789

Sunrise Shores is an unincorporated community and census-designated place (CDP) in Henderson County, Texas, United States. It was first listed as a CDP prior to the 2020 census. As of the 2020 census, Sunrise Shores had a population of 598.

It is on the eastern side of the county, on the west shore of Lake Palestine, a reservoir on the Neches River. It is 5 miles (8 km) northwest of Texas State Highway 155 at Coffee City, and it is 24 miles (39 km) east of Athens.

== Demographics ==
Historical population
Census	Pop.	Note	%±
2020	598		—
U.S. Decennial Census; 1850–1900 1910; 1920 1930 1940; 1950 1960 1970; 1980 1990 2000; 2010 2020

Sunrise Shores first appeared as a census designated place in the 2020 U.S. census.

=== 2020 census ===
Sunrise Shores CDP, Texas – Racial and ethnic composition Note: the US Census treats Hispanic/Latino as an ethnic category. This table excludes Latinos from the racial categories and assigns them to a separate category. Hispanics/Latinos may be of any race.
Race / Ethnicity (NH = Non-Hispanic)	Pop 2020	% 2020
White alone (NH)	492	82.27%
Black or African American alone (NH)	9	1.51%
Native American or Alaska Native alone (NH)	7	1.17%
Asian alone (NH)	6	1.00%
Native Hawaiian or Pacific Islander alone (NH)	0	0.00%
Other race alone (NH)	0	0.00%
Mixed race or Multiracial (NH)	39	6.52%
Hispanic or Latino (any race)	45	7.53%
Total	598	100.00%
