= Ruth Springs, Texas =

- Unincorporated community
- Location within Texas Location within the United States
- Coordinates: 32°12′11.24″N 96°05′53.89″W
- Country: United States
- State: Texas
- County: Henderson

Population (2000)
  - Total: 15
- Time zone: UTC-6 (Central (CST))
  - Summer (DST): UTC-5 (CDT)
- Area codes: 430, 903
- GNIS feature ID: 2033846

Ruth Springs is an unincorporated community in Henderson County, located in the U.S. state of Texas. As of 2000, its population was 15.

== Geography ==
The community lies on the western shore of the Cedar Creek Reservoir, few km far from the Texas State Highway 274, between the cities of Tool and Trinidad. The residential area is concentrated mainly around the lakefront.
