= Mankin, Texas =

- Unincorporated community
- Location within Texas Location within the United States
- Coordinates: 32°11′03″N 96°06′47.4″W
- Country: United States
- State: Texas
- County: Henderson
- Time zone: UTC-6 (Central (CST))
  - Summer (DST): UTC-5 (CDT)
- Area codes: 430, 903
- GNIS feature ID: 2034052

Mankin is an unincorporated community in Henderson County, located in the U.S. state of Texas.

== Geography ==
The community lies nearby the western front of the Cedar Creek Reservoir, on the Texas State Highway 274, between the cities of Tool and Trinidad. It has a cemetery and a church in the east.
