= Berryville, Texas =

- Town
- Interactive map of Berryville, Texas
- Coordinates: 32°05′18″N 95°28′23″W
- Country: United States
- State: Texas
- County: Henderson

Area
  - Total: 1.31 sq mi (3.39 km^{2})
  - Land: 1.31 sq mi (3.39 km^{2})
  - Water: 0 sq mi (0.00 km^{2})
- Elevation: 377 ft (115 m)

Population (2020)
  - Total: 824
  - Density: 812.7/sq mi (313.77/km^{2})
- Time zone: UTC-6 (Central (CST))
  - Summer (DST): UTC-5 (CDT)
- ZIP code: 75763 (Frankston)
- Area codes: 430, 903
- FIPS code: 48-07852
- GNIS feature ID: 2411680
- Website: www.cityofberryville.org

Berryville is a town in Henderson County, Texas, United States. The population was 824 at the 2020 census, down from 975 at the 2010 census.

== Geography ==
Berryville is located in the southeastern corner of Henderson County on the western shore of Lake Palestine, on both sides of Cobb Inlet. The southern town border follows the Anderson County line. The town limits extend west to Texas State Highway 155, which leads south 2 miles (3 km) to Frankston and northeast 22 miles (35 km) to Tyler. Athens, the Henderson county seat, is 26 miles (42 km) west of Berryville.

According to the United States Census Bureau, the town has a total area of 1.3 square miles (3.4 km^{2}), all land.

== Demographics ==
Historical population
Census	Pop.	Note	%±
1980	513		—
1990	749		46.0%
2000	891		19.0%
2010	975		9.4%
2020	824		−15.5%
U.S. Decennial Census

Berryville racial composition as of 2020 (NH = Non-Hispanic) (Note: Note: the US Census treats Hispanic/Latino as an ethnic category. This table excludes Latinos from the racial categories and assigns them to a separate category. Hispanics/Latinos can be of any race.)
Race	Number	Percentage
White (NH)	696	84.47%
Black or African American (NH)	36	4.37%
Native American or Alaska Native (NH)	5	0.61%
Asian (NH)	5	0.61%
Some Other Race (NH)	1	0.12%
Mixed/Multi-Racial (NH)	30	3.64%
Hispanic or Latino	51	6.19%
Total	824	

As of the 2020 United States census, there were 824 people, 493 households, and 376 families residing in the town.

As of the census of 2000, there were 891 people, 355 households, and 263 families residing in the town. The population density was 678.1 inhabitants per square mile (261.8/km^{2}). There were 454 housing units at an average density of 345.5 per square mile (133.4/km^{2}). The racial makeup of the town was 93.71% White, 3.59% African American, 1.35% Native American, 0.11% Asian, 0.11% from other races, and 1.12% from two or more races. Hispanic or Latino of any race were 2.81% of the population.

There were 355 households, out of which 29.0% had children under the age of 18 living with them, 59.4% were married couples living together, 11.5% had a female householder with no husband present, and 25.9% were non-families. 22.0% of all households were made up of individuals, and 11.0% had someone living alone who was 65 years of age or older. The average household size was 2.51 and the average family size was 2.92.

In the town, the population was spread out, with 24.2% under the age of 18, 8.2% from 18 to 24, 25.7% from 25 to 44, 25.8% from 45 to 64, and 16.0% who were 65 years of age or older. The median age was 39 years. For every 100 females, there were 105.3 males. For every 100 females age 18 and over, there were 94.0 males.

The median income for a household in the town was $31,618, and the median income for a family was $35,990. Males had a median income of $29,167 versus $19,853 for females. The per capita income for the town was $14,478. About 13.7% of families and 16.4% of the population were below the poverty line, including 25.2% of those under age 18 and 6.9% of those age 65 or over.

== Education ==
Berryville is served by the Frankston Independent School District.
