= Mankin =

Mankin may refer to:

== People ==
- Hart T. Mankin, American lawyer
- Helen Douglas Mankin (1896-1956), American politician
- Romi Mankin (b. 1947), Estonian physicist
- Valentin Mankin (1938–2014), Soviet / Ukrainian sailor
- Michael J. Mankin (b. 1948), American architect, disability rights leader.

== Places ==
- Mankien (or Mankin), a town in South Sudan
- Mankin, Texas, an unincorporated community in the United States
- Mankins, Texas, an unincorporated community in the United States
