= Coffee City, Texas =

- Town
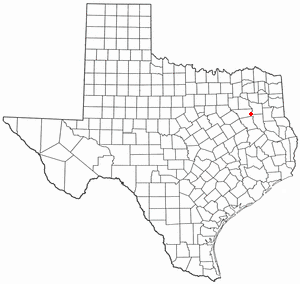
- Location of Coffee City, Texas

- Coordinates: 32°07′32″N 95°29′58″W
- Country: United States
- State: Texas
- County: Henderson
- Incorporated: 1970

Area
  - Total: 6.66 sq mi (17.24 km^{2})
  - Land: 1.93 sq mi (5.01 km^{2})
  - Water: 4.72 sq mi (12.23 km^{2})
- Elevation: 341 ft (104 m)

Population (2020)
  - Total: 249
  - Density: 129/sq mi (49.7/km^{2})
- Time zone: UTC-6 (Central (CST))
  - Summer (DST): UTC-5 (CDT)
- ZIP code: 75763 (Frankston)
- Area codes: 430, 903
- FIPS code: 48-15820
- GNIS feature ID: 2413220
- Website: www.cityofcoffeecity.com

Coffee City is a small town in southeastern Henderson County, Texas, United States. The population was 249 at the 2020 census, down from 278 at the 2010 census.

== History ==
The city was developed after the construction of Lake Palestine in the early 1960s. As it is located on a sliver of Henderson County, a wet county, which extends eastward onto Lake Palestine and Texas State Highway 155, a number of liquor stores sprang up by the 1980s to capture business from residents of Tyler and neighboring Smith County (which at the time was dry). The importance of Coffee City declined in 2012 with the passage of legislation which allowed beer and wine sales in Tyler.

== Geography ==
Coffee City is located in southeastern Henderson County. It is on the western shore of Lake Palestine, a reservoir on the Neches River. The town limits extend into the center of the lake, which is the border with Smith and Cherokee counties. To the south, the town includes Ledbetter Bay and its two inlets: Ledbetter Inlet and Highsaw Cove, while to the north the town extends beyond the Caney Bay inlet.

Texas Highway 155 crosses Ledbetter Bay as it passes through Coffee City, then crosses Lake Palestine into Smith County. The highway leads northeast 19 miles (31 km) to Tyler and south 6 miles (10 km) to Frankston. Athens, the Henderson county seat, is 29 miles (47 km) west of Coffee City by highway.

As of the 2010 census, the town had a total area of 6.6 square miles (17.2 km^{2}), of which 1.9 square miles (5.0 km^{2}) were land and 4.7 square miles (12.2 km^{2}), or 70.96%, were water.

== Demographics ==
Historical population
Census	Pop.	Note	%±
1970	157		—
1980	254		61.8%
1990	216		−15.0%
2000	193		−10.6%
2010	278		44.0%
2020	249		−10.4%
U.S. Decennial Census; 2020 Census

As of the census of 2000, there were 193 people. With active annexations, 84 households, and 58 families residing in the city. The population density was 105.4 inhabitants per square mile (40.7/km^{2}). There were 109 housing units at an average density of 59.5 units per square mile (23.0 units/km^{2}). The racial makeup of the city was 56.99% White, 41.45% African American and 1.55% Native American. Hispanic or Latino of any race were 0.52% of the population.

There were 84 households, out of which 22.6% had children under the age of 18 living with them, 48.8% were married couples living together, 16.7% had a female householder with no husband present, and 29.8% were non-families. 25.0% of all households were made up of individuals, and 16.7% had someone living alone who was 65 years of age or older. The average household size was 2.30 and the average family size was 2.69.

In the city, the population was spread out, with 20.7% under the age of 18, 6.2% from 18 to 24, 20.7% from 25 to 44, 31.6% from 45 to 64, and 20.7% who were 65 years of age or older. The median age was 46 years. For every 100 females, there were 96.9 males. For every 100 females age 18 and over, there were 88.9 males.

The median income for a household in the city was $34,792, and the median income for a family was $40,833. Males had a median income of $26,607 versus $30,833 for females. The per capita income for the city was $19,789. About 26.6% of families and 22.6% of the population were below the poverty line, including 44.0% of those under the age of eighteen and 31.0% of those 65 or over.

The community is a known for being a speed trap.

== Police ==
The town maintains its own local police department, the Coffee City Police Department. In August 2023, an investigation by Houston television station KHOU found it was a relatively large police force with 50 personnel, more than 20% of the town's population, and more than five times the number employed by other municipalities of similar size. More than half of the department's officers had reportedly been previously suspended, demoted, or terminated in prior law enforcement jobs. Additionally, John Jay Portillo, the chief of police, was discovered to have failed to disclose on his job application an unresolved DUI charge out of Florida. After becoming chief of police, Portillo also launched a questionable warrant division in which full-time officers were not required to work in the city. Several officers were also found to work private security jobs in the area (Texas law allows full-time police to hire themselves out for extra money). Portillo was suspended from his position on September 5, pending an investigation. On September 11, the city council unanimously voted to fire Portillo and to temporarily deactivate the department, pending the hire of a new chief, with the Henderson County Sheriff's Office taking over in the interim, assisted by deputies from the nearby Smith County Sheriff's Office. Questions regarding funding of the new police department have delayed action by the town council.

== Education ==
Coffee City is served by the Brownsboro Independent School District, Frankston Independent School District, and LaPoynor Independent School District.
