= King's Creek (Texas) =

Creek in Texas, USA

Coordinates: 32°24′50″N 96°11′35″W

King's Creek is a creek in Rockwall and Kaufman counties in Texas.

== Course ==
King's Creek flows from central Rockwall County south past US 80, I—20, US 175, and SH 274 into Cedar Creek Lake, a reservoir near Kemp.

Before being dammed, it flowed into Cedar Creek, which is a tributary of the Trinity River.

== See also ==
- List of rivers of Texas
