= Corinth, Henderson County, Texas =

- Ghost town
- Location within Texas Location within the United States
- Coordinates: 32°06′50″N 95°53′22″W
- Country: United States
- State: Texas
- County: Henderson
- Elevation: 404 ft (123 m)

Corinth is a ghost town in Henderson County, Texas, United States. Corinth was located on Farm to Market Road 753, 6 miles (9.7 km) southwest of Athens.

== History ==
In the 1930s, Corinth had a school, a church, and several homes. By 1990, all that remained of Corinth was its church and some dispersed houses.
