= Chandler, Texas =

- City
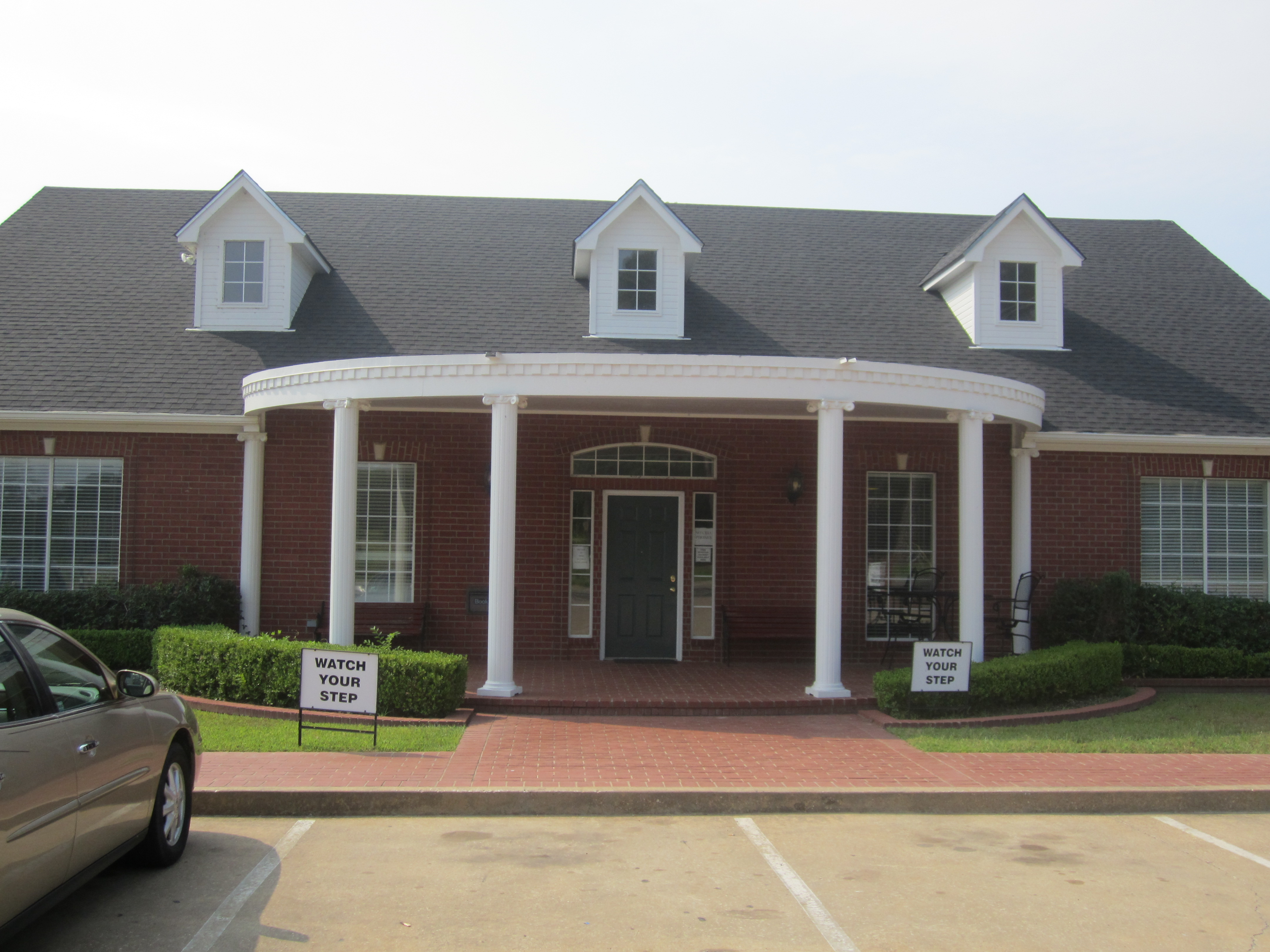
- Chandler Library

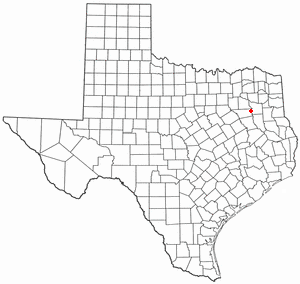
- Location of Chandler, Texas

- Coordinates: 32°18′23″N 95°28′41″W
- Country: United States
- State: Texas
- County: Henderson

Government
  - Type: General Law

Area
  - Total: 6.20 sq mi (16.06 km^{2})
  - Land: 6.07 sq mi (15.72 km^{2})
  - Water: 0.13 sq mi (0.34 km^{2})
- Elevation: 394 ft (120 m)

Population (2020)
  - Total: 3,275
  - Density: 524.1/sq mi (202.35/km^{2})
- Time zone: UTC-6 (Central (CST))
  - Summer (DST): UTC-5 (CDT)
- ZIP code: 75758
- Area codes: 430, 903
- FIPS code: 48-14224
- GNIS feature ID: 2409435
- Website: www.chandlertx.com

Chandler is a city in Henderson County, Texas, United States, at the northern end of Lake Palestine. Its population was 3,275 at the 2020 census, up from 2,734 at the 2010 census.

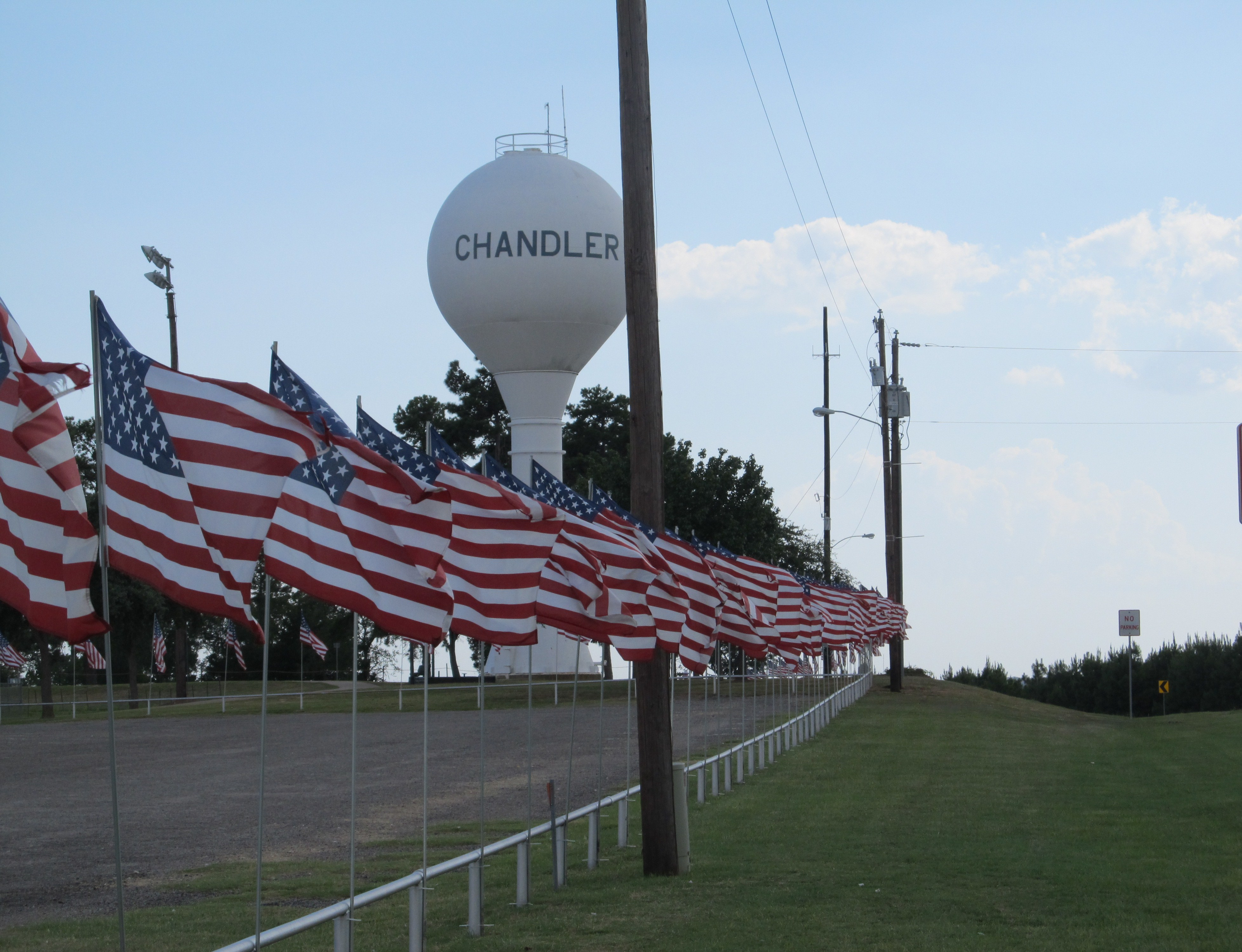
An American flag display at Winchester Park in Chandler

== Geography ==
Chandler is located in the northeast corner of Henderson County. Texas State Highway 31 runs through the center of Chandler, leading east 11 miles (18 km) to Tyler and southwest 24 miles (39 km) to Athens, the Henderson County seat.

According to the United States Census Bureau, Chandler has a total area of 6.2 square miles (16.1 km^{2}), of which 0.1 square miles (0.3 km^{2}), or 2.13%, is covered by water. The city sits on high ground between the northern ends of two arms of Lake Palestine: Kickapoo Creek to the west and the Neches River to the east.

== Demographics ==
Historical population
Census	Pop.	Note	%±
1970	765		—
1980	1,308		71.0%
1990	1,630		24.6%
2000	2,099		28.8%
2010	2,734		30.3%
2020	3,275		19.8%
U.S. Decennial Census

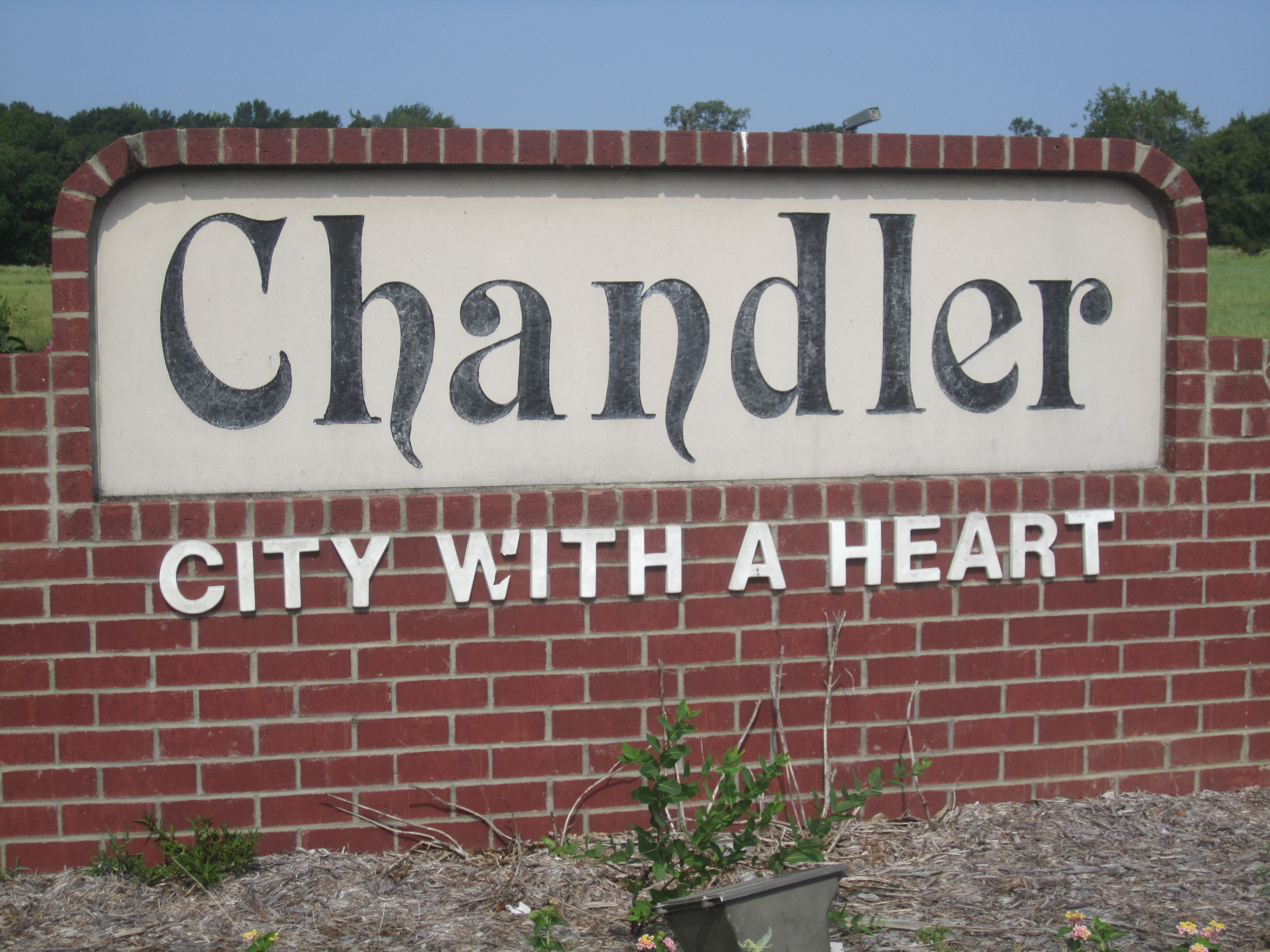
Chandler welcome sign

=== 2020 census ===
As of the 2020 census, Chandler had a population of 3,275 and a median age of 44.4 years. Twenty point nine percent of residents were under the age of 18 and 26.1% of residents were 65 years of age or older; there were 83.6 males per 100 females overall and 79.9 males per 100 females age 18 and over.

0% of residents lived in urban areas, while 100.0% lived in rural areas.

There were 1,343 households in Chandler, of which 29.6% had children under the age of 18 living in them. Of all households, 53.2% were married-couple households, 13.2% were households with a male householder and no spouse or partner present, and 30.2% were households with a female householder and no spouse or partner present. About 28.1% of all households were made up of individuals and 16.5% had someone living alone who was 65 years of age or older. The census also counted 811 families residing in the city.

There were 1,395 housing units, of which 3.7% were vacant. Among occupied housing units, 67.0% were owner-occupied and 33.0% were renter-occupied. The homeowner vacancy rate was 0.8% and the rental vacancy rate was 3.2%.

Racial composition as of the 2020 census
Race	Percent
White	80.7%
Black or African American	11.2%
American Indian and Alaska Native	0.5%
Asian	1.4%
Native Hawaiian and Other Pacific Islander	0%
Some other race	1.1%
Two or more races	5.2%
Hispanic or Latino (of any race)	5.2%

=== 2000 census ===
As of the 2000 census, 2,099 people, 817 households, and 588 families were residing in the city. The population density was 598.9 people/sq mi (231.6/km^{2}). The 877 housing units averaged 250.2/sq mi (96.7/km^{2}). The racial makeup of the city was 84.18% White, 13.15% African American, 0.29% Native American, 0.76% Asian, 0.29% from other races, and 1.33% from two or more races. Hispanics or Latinos of any race were 0.81% of the population.

Of the 817 households, 31.7% had children under 18 living with them, 56.9% were married couples living together, 12.4% had a female householder with no husband present, and 28.0% were not families. About 25.3% of all households were made up of individuals, and 13.8% had someone living alone who was 65 or older. The average household size was 2.47, and the average family size was 2.96.

In the city, the age distribution was 24.4% under 18, 6.1% from 18 to 24, 28.2% from 25 to 44, 21.2% from 45 to 64, and 20.2% who were 65 or older. The median age was 39 years. For every 100 females, there were 84.1 males. For every 100 females age 18 and over, there were 78.9 males.

The median income for a household in the city was $38,641, and for a family was $50,000. Males had a median income of $36,125 versus $26,615 for females. The per capita income for the city was $19,075. About 8.2% of families and 9.8% of the population were below the poverty line, including 9.7% of those under age 18 and 11.0% of those age 65 or over.

== Public amenities ==
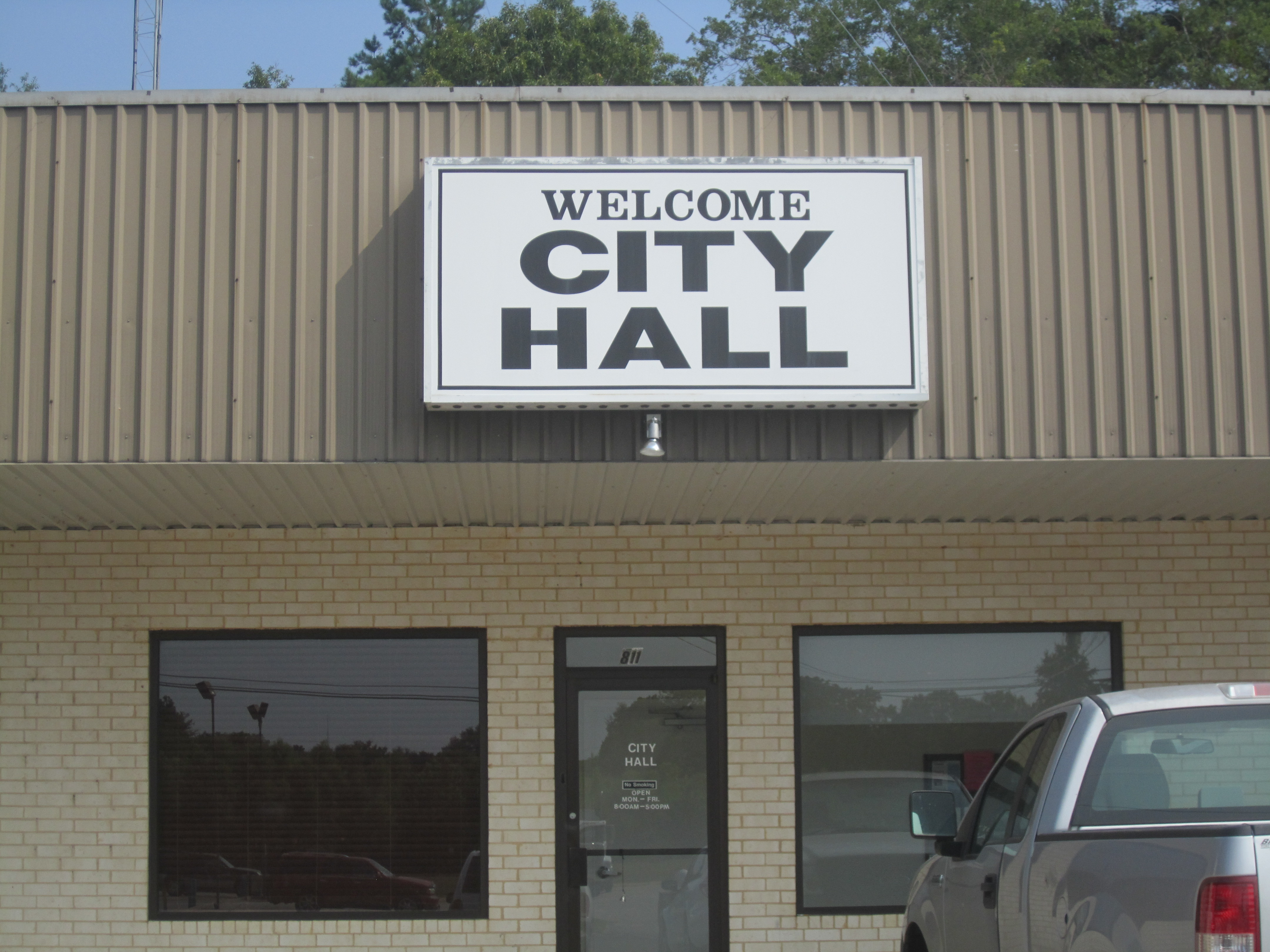
Chandler City Hall

The city has three public parks: Winchester Park is located on FM 315 South. It boasts five baseball fields, a playground, soccer fields, two pavilions, two concession areas, a pond, and a walking trail. McCain Park, located on Hwy 31 West, is home to the Chandler Historical Museums. This includes the historic Yarborough House and original train depot. River Park, located on Hwy 31 East, provides great opportunities for boating, fishing, and birdwatching on the Neches River.

University of Texas ET Medical Center operates an outpatient treatment/fitness center near the central part of Chandler, and Christus Mother Frances also has a clinic in Chandler. Free Wi-Fi is available at the Chandler Public Library.

== Education ==
Chandler is served by the Brownsboro Independent School District. Two public school campuses are located in the city: Chandler Elementary School and Chandler Intermediate School.

== Notable person ==
- Ralph Yarborough, U.S. senator, was born in Chandler

== See also ==
- List of cities in Texas
