= Star Harbor, Texas =

- City
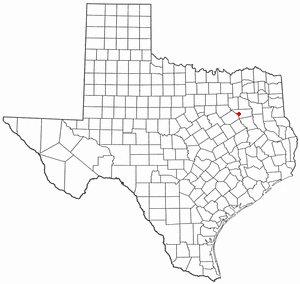
- Location of Star Harbor, Texas

- Coordinates: 32°11′34″N 96°03′15″W
- Country: United States
- State: Texas
- County: Henderson

Area
  - Total: 0.55 sq mi (1.43 km^{2})
  - Land: 0.47 sq mi (1.21 km^{2})
  - Water: 0.085 sq mi (0.22 km^{2})
- Elevation: 335 ft (102 m)

Population (2020)
  - Total: 482
  - Density: 1,021.1/sq mi (394.26/km^{2})
- Time zone: UTC-6 (Central (CST))
  - Summer (DST): UTC-5 (CDT)
- Area codes: 903, 430
- FIPS code: 48-70076
- GNIS feature ID: 2411973
- Website: cityofstarharbor.com

Star Harbor is a city in Henderson County, Texas, United States. Its population was 482 at the 2020 census.

== Geography ==
Star Harbor is located in western Henderson County at the south end of Cedar Creek Reservoir. The city occupies a peninsula on the east side of the lake, half a mile north of the lake's dam. The main body of the lake is to the south, west, and north of the city, while the lake arm formed by Caney Creek is to the northeast. Star Harbor is 4 miles (6 km) northwest of Malakoff and 13 miles (21 km) west of Athens, the Henderson county seat.

According to the United States Census Bureau, Star Harbor has a total area of 0.54 square miles (1.4 km^{2}), of which 0.1 sq mi (0.2 km^{2}), or 15.52%, is covered by water.

== Demographics ==
Historical population
Census	Pop.	Note	%±
1980	310		—
1990	368		18.7%
2000	416		13.0%
2010	444		6.7%
2020	482		8.6%
U.S. Decennial Census

=== 2020 census ===
As of the 2020 census, Star Harbor had a population of 482. The median age was 57.7 years.

About 12.0% of the residents were under 18 and 35.1% were 65 or older. For every 100 females, there were 98.4 males, and for every 100 females 18 and over, there were 91.9 males 18 and over.

None of residents lived in urban areas, while 100.0% lived in rural areas.

Of the 218 households in Star Harbor, 23.4% had children under 18 living in them, 63.8% were married-couple households, 11.9% were households with a male householder and no spouse or partner present, and 19.7% were households with a female householder and no spouse or partner present. About 17.4% of all households were made up of individuals, and 11.4% had someone living alone who was 65 or older.

The city had 337 housing units, of which 35.3% were vacant. The homeowner vacancy rate was 2.9% and the rental vacancy rate was 9.1%.

Racial composition as of the 2020 census
Race	Number	Percentage
White	441	91.5%
Black or African American	1	0.2%
American Indian and Alaska Native	1	0.2%
Asian	5	1.0%
Native Hawaiian and other Pacific Islander	0	0.0%
Some other race	4	0.8%
Two or more races	30	6.2%
Hispanic or Latino (of any race)	17	3.5%

=== 2000 census ===
As of the 2000 census, there were 416 people, 200 households, and 159 families residing in the city. The population density was 843.0 inhabitants per square mile (325.5/km^{2}). There were 268 housing units at an average density of 543.1 per square mile (209.7/km^{2}). The racial makeup of the city was 97.60% White, 1.20% African American, and 1.20% from two or more races. Hispanic or Latino of any race were 1.68% of the population.

Of the 200 households, 8.5% had children under 18 living with them, 75.0% were married couples living together, 3.5% had a female householder with no husband present, and 20.5% were not families. About 19.0% of all households were made up of individuals, and 13.5% had someone living alone who was 65 or older. The average household size was 2.08, and the average family size was 2.30.

In the city, the age distribution was 8.7% under 18, 2.4% from 18 to 24, 10.6% from 25 to 44, 34.6% from 45 to 64, and 43.8% who were 65 or older. The median age was 63 years. For every 100 females, there were 96.2 males. For every 100 females 18 and over, there were 97.9 males.

The median income in the city for a household was $55,682 and for a family was $55,455. Males had a median income of $61,923 versus $17,250 for females. The per capita income for the city was $30,845. None of the population or families were below the poverty line.

== Education ==
Star Harbor is served by the Malakoff Independent School District.
