= Ash Switch, Texas =

Ghost town in Texas, US

- Ghost town
- Location in Texas
- Coordinates: 32.26681560°N 95.79690900°W
- Country: United States
- State: Texas
- County: Henderson

Ash Switch is a ghost town in Henderson County, Texas, United States. Situated on Farm to Market Road 1616, it was settled by the 1890s, by the town's namesake, John Ash. Also in the late 19th century, the St. Louis Southwestern Railway built a flag station there, hence the "Switch" in the name. Five residents lived there by the 1930s, and the community was abandoned following World War II.
