= Cedar Creek (Trinity River tributary) =

Coordinates: 32°04′35″N 96°05′17″W

Cedar Creek is a creek in Kaufman County, Van Zandt County, and Henderson County in Texas.

It is a tributary to the Trinity River. The creek's impoundment forms the reservoir named Cedar Creek Lake.

== Course ==
Cedar Creek begins in northern Kaufman County, flows down into the Cedar Creek Reservoir just east of King's Creek, flows underneath SH 31 between Trinidad and Malakoff. Its confluence with the Trinity River is south of Trinidad.

== See also ==
- List of rivers of Texas
