= Athens Daily Review =

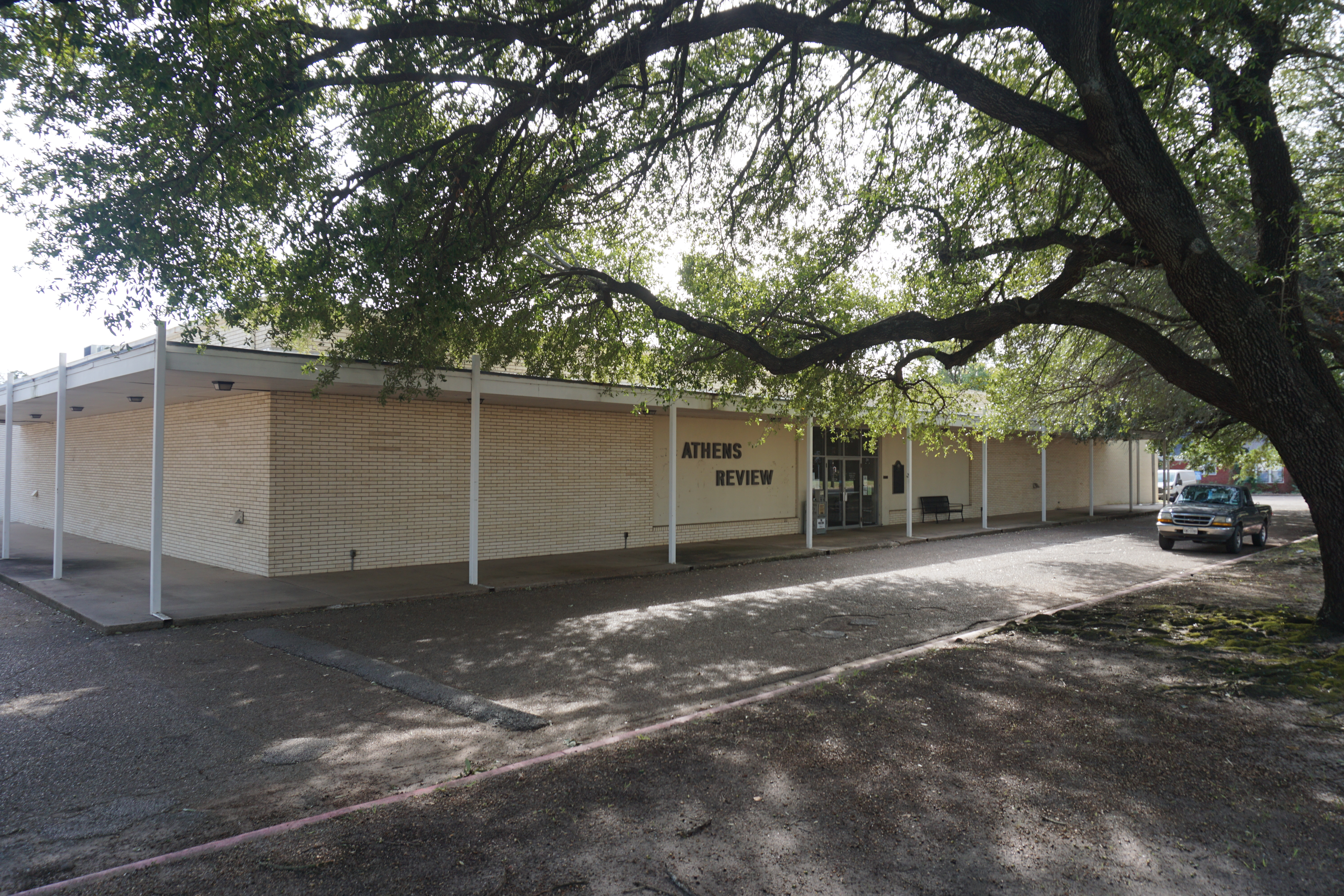
- Athens Review building
- Type: Semi-weekly newspaper
- Format: Broadsheet
- Owner: Community Newspaper Holdings Inc.
- Publisher: Lange Svehlak
- Editor: Penny Webb
- Founded: 1885
- Headquarters: 201 South Prairieville Street Athens, Texas 75751; United States
- Circulation: 1,578 (as of 2023)
- Website: athensreview.com

The Athens Daily Review is a semi-weekly newspaper in Athens, Texas, published mornings on Wednesday and Saturday, and distributed throughout Henderson County. It is owned by Community Newspaper Holdings Inc., which acquired the paper from Donrey Media Group in 1998 as part of a 28-paper transaction.

J.B. Bishop and George M. Johnson founded the weekly Athens Review in 1885. After multiple ownership changes, Robert Enoch Yantis converted the paper to a daily in 1901.
