= Centreville, Texas =

- Ghost town
- Location within Texas Location within the United States
- Coordinates: 32°19′50.73″N 96°5′37.87″W
- Country: United States
- State: Texas
- County: Henderson
- Area codes: 430, 903
- GNIS feature ID: 2034427

Centreville is a ghost town in Henderson County, located in the U.S. state of Texas. It was the county seat from 1848 to 1850.

== Geography ==
The ghost town is located in the eastern shore of the Cedar Creek Reservoir, on the Texas State Highway 334, between Eustace and Gun Barrel City. It lies in an area of recent urban development.
