= Aley (disambiguation) =

Aley is a city in Lebanon.

Aley may also refer to:

== Places ==
- Aley, Somerset, a village in England, United Kingdom
- Aley, Texas, a village in Texas, United States
- Aley District, a district in Mount Lebanon, Lebanon
- Aley (river), a river in Russia

== People with the surname ==
- Sarah Aley (born 1984), Australian cricketer
- Zac Aley (born 1991), English footballer
