= Opelika, Texas =

- Unincorporated community
- Location within Texas Location within the United States
- Coordinates: 32°17′50″N 95°40′28″W
- Country: United States
- State: Texas
- County: Henderson
- Elevation: 420 ft (130 m)
- Time zone: UTC-6 (Central (CST))
  - Summer (DST): UTC-5 (CDT)
- Area codes: 430, 903
- GNIS feature ID: 1380308

Opelika is an unincorporated community in Henderson County, located in the U.S. state of Texas.

The community was known earlier as Wanda but was renamed by a settler from Opelika, Alabama. A post office was established in 1912. A poultry breeder, a cotton gin, a fruit-growers association, a general store, and a real estate office were reported in 1914. The earliest figures showed a population of fifty until after World War II, when the number dropped to twenty. After 1970, no census figures were given. The post office was closed in 1923. Public schools were reported in 1928 and 1929, and highway maps of the mid-1930s indicate a school, a church, and one business. In the 1930s the town was heavily involved in the oil industry. The Opelika oilfield is north of the townsite. Maps in 1983 and 1985 showed a church and a cemetery.
