= Brownsboro Independent School District =

School district in Texas

Brownsboro Independent School District is a state-recognized 4A public school district based in Brownsboro, Texas (USA).

In addition to Brownsboro, the school district serves the cities of Chandler, Murchison, portions of Coffee City, Athens, and Moore Station in north-eastern Henderson County.

In 2023, BISD was rated "Recognized" by the Texas Education Agency.

== Schools ==
=== High school (Grades 9–12) ===
- Brownsboro High School (Texas)

=== Junior high school (Grades 7–8) ===
- Brownsboro Junior High School

=== Intermediate schools (Grades 4–6) ===
- Brownsboro Intermediate
- Chandler Intermediate

=== Elementary schools (Grades PK–3) ===
- Brownsboro Elementary
- Chandler Elementary (2004 National Blue Ribbon School)
