= Frankston Independent School District =

Public schools in Texas, United States

Location
- Frankston, Texas ESC Region 7 USA

District information
- Type: Public Independent school district
- Motto: Every Child Matters
- Grades: Pre-K through 12
- Superintendent: Nicci Cook
- Schools: 3 (2011-12)
- NCES District ID: 4819770

Students and staff
- Students: 769 (2020–2021)
- Teachers: 65.4 (on an FTE basis)
- Staff: 67.2 (on an FTE basis)
- Student–teacher ratio: 11.76:1

Other information
- Website: www.frankstonisd.net

The Frankston Independent School District is a public school district based in Frankston, Texas (USA).

The district is located in northeastern Anderson County and extends into southeastern Henderson County, including the town of Berryville and some of the town of Coffee City.

In 2009, the school district was rated "academically acceptable" by the Texas Education Agency.

== Schools ==
Frankston ISD has three schools:

- Frankston High School (Grades 9-12)
- Frankston Middle School (Grades 6-8)
- Frankston Elementary School (Grades PK-5)

== Notable alumni ==
- J.D. Spears, composer for League of Legends
