= Evelyn, Texas =

- Unincorporated community
- Location within Texas Location within the United States
- Coordinates: 32°18′26″N 95°31′58″W
- Country: United States
- State: Texas
- County: Henderson
- Elevation: 361 ft (110 m)
- Time zone: UTC-6 (Central (CST))
  - Summer (DST): UTC-5 (CDT)
- Area codes: 430, 903
- GNIS feature ID: 1379742

Evelyn is an unincorporated community in Henderson County, located in the U.S. state of Texas.
