= New York, Texas =

- Unincorporated community
- Location within Texas Location within the United States
- Coordinates: 32°10′12″N 95°40′12″W
- Country: United States
- State: Texas
- County: Henderson
- Time zone: UTC-6 (Central (CST))
  - Summer (DST): UTC-5 (CDT)
- Area codes: 903, 430

New York is an unincorporated community in Henderson County, Texas, United States, about 11 miles east of Athens.

== Geography ==
New York lies at the intersection of FM 804 and FM 607 in a hilly portion of East Texas, surrounded mostly by farm land. It is 87 miles east of Dallas.

== History ==
New York was first settled around 1856 by James C. Walker, Davis Reynolds, Jesse M. Forester, and A. M. Otts at a location south of the present site. The present site was settled in 1873. The community was reportedly named either by T. B. Herndon as a joke or by Reynolds because of his hopes for the town's future. By 1884 New York had two steam gristmills and cotton gins, two churches, a district school, and a population of 60, which rose to 100 by 1892. A post office operated there from 1876 to the first decade of the 1900s. The town declined after it was bypassed by the railroad in 1901. Its school was consolidated with the Poynor system in 1936.

In 1986, nearby Dunsavage Farms (a restaurant, antique shop, and bed and breakfast) began to market "New York, Texas, Cheesecake", which became nationally known by 1992. The company is now located in Athens, Texas.

== Demographics ==
In 1992 the town included the Reynolds store, a Baptist church, and a population of 20.

== See also ==
- Texas, New York
