= Tool, Texas =

- City
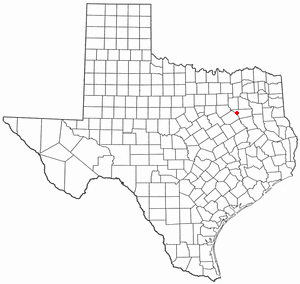
- Location of Tool, Texas

- Coordinates: 32°15′45″N 96°09′35″W
- Country: United States
- State: Texas
- County: Henderson

Area
  - Total: 3.60 sq mi (9.33 km^{2})
  - Land: 3.59 sq mi (9.30 km^{2})
  - Water: 0.012 sq mi (0.03 km^{2})
- Elevation: 364 ft (111 m)

Population (2020)
  - Total: 2,175
  - Density: 641.2/sq mi (247.58/km^{2})
- Time zone: UTC-6 (Central (CST))
  - Summer (DST): UTC-5 (CDT)
- Zip Code: 75143
- Area codes: 903, 430
- FIPS code: 48-73352
- GNIS feature ID: 2412085
- Website: tooltexas.org

Tool is a city in Henderson County, Texas, United States. Its population was 2,175 at the 2020 census. Located on the west side of Cedar Creek Lake, it is a popular second home and retiree destination.

== Geography ==
Tool is located in northwestern Henderson County on the west side of Cedar Creek Lake. Texas State Highway 274 is the main road through the city, leading northwest 4 miles (6 km) to Seven Points and southeast 9 miles (14 km) to Trinidad. Athens, the Henderson county seat, is 24 miles (39 km) by road to the southeast of Tool.

According to the United States Census Bureau, the city has a total area of 3.6 square miles (9.3 km^{2}), of which 0.012 sq mi (0.03 km^{2}), or 0.36%, is covered by water.

== Demographics ==
Historical population
Census	Pop.	Note	%±
1970	258		—
1980	1,464		467.4%
1990	1,712		16.9%
2000	2,275		32.9%
2010	2,240		−1.5%
2020	2,175		−2.9%
U.S. Decennial Census

=== 2020 census ===
As of the 2020 census, 2,175 people, 943 households, and 719 families were residing in the city. The median age was 51.7 years; 15.7% of the residents were under 18 and 26.9% were 65 or older. For every 100 females, there were 94.9 males, and for every 100 females 18 and over, there were 94.5 males 18 and over.

None of the residents lived in urban areas, while 100.0% lived in rural areas.

Of the 943 households in Tool, 18.7% had children under 18 living in them, 44.9% were married-couple households, 21.5% were households with a male householder and no spouse or partner present, and 24.9% were households with a female householder and no spouse or partner present. About 28.8% of all households were made up of individuals, and 14.9% had someone living alone who was 65 or older.

Of the 1,516 housing units, 37.8% were vacant. The homeowner vacancy rate was 3.7% and the rental vacancy rate was 14.0%.

Racial composition as of the 2020 census
Race	Number	Percentage
White	1,892	87.0%
Black or African American	19	0.9%
American Indian and Alaska Native	15	0.7%
Asian	28	1.3%
Native Hawaiian and other Pacific Islander	4	0.2%
Some other race	31	1.4%
Two or more races	186	8.6%
Hispanic or Latino (of any race)	168	7.7%

=== 2000 census ===
As of the census of 2000, 2,275 people, 1,006 households, and 682 families resided in the city. The population density was 630.6 inhabitants per square mile (243.5/km^{2}). The 1,416 housing units had an average density of 392.5 per square mile (151.5/km^{2}). The racial makeup of the city was 95.56% White, 0.40% African American, 0.40% Native American, 0.13% Asian, 0.22% Pacific Islander, 1.19% from other races, and 2.11% from two or more races. Hispanics or Latinos of any race were 2.33% of the population.

Of the 1,006 households, 19.7% had children under 18 living with them, 53.0% were married couples living together, 10.5% had a female householder with no husband present, and 32.2% were not families. About 27.4% of all households were made up of individuals, and 14.9% had someone living alone who was 65 age or older. The average household size was 2.26, and the average family size was 2.73.

In the city, the age distribution was 19.3% under 18, 5.3% from 18 to 24, 22.7% from 25 to 44, 28.4% from 45 to 64, and 24.3% who were 65 or older. The median age was 47 years. For every 100 females, there were 97.5 males. For every 100 females 18 and over, there were 94.2 males.

The median income in the city for a household was $32,679 and for a family was $37,396. Males had a median income of $33,534 versus $24,000 for females. The per capita income for the city was $19,507. About 10.8% of families and 15.1% of the population were below the poverty line, including 26.6% of those under 18 and 7.5% of those 65 or over.

== Education ==
Tool is served by the Malakoff and Mabank Independent School Districts.
