= Lake Athens =

- Location within Texas Location within the United States
- Location: Athens, Texas
- Coordinates: 32°12′47″N 95°44′46″W
- Type: reservoir
- Catchment area: 21.6 sq mi (56 km^{2})
- Basin countries: United States
- Surface area: 1,799 acres (7.28 km^{2})
- Max. depth: 50 ft (15 m)
- Surface elevation: 440 ft (134 m)

Lake Athens is a 1,799 acre reservoir located on the east side of Athens, Texas in Henderson County.

The Texas Freshwater Fisheries Center is located on the north shore of the lake. The lake is located in the Neches River Basin on Flat Creek (a tributary of the Neches River). It has a maximum depth of 50 feet (15 m).

Lake Athens Dam has a length of 3,000 feet (910 m) and a maximum height of 67 feet (20 m). The drainage area contained by the dam is 21.6 square miles (56 km^{2}).

== History ==
The Lake Athens reservoir was constructed in 1962. The Athens Municipal Water Authority oversees Lake Athens and Lake Athens Dam. The construction of the dam began on September 25, 1961, and was completed in May 1963. The design engineer for the dam project was Wisenbaker, Fix, and Associates. The contractor for the project was Elm Fork Construction Co. Lake Athens was built for recreation, flood control, and water supply. The Caddoan Indians lived in the region and made pottery out of clay deposits in the area. The name "Athens" came from the city Athens, Greece. This name was suggested by Dulcina A. Holland in 1850.

== Recreation ==
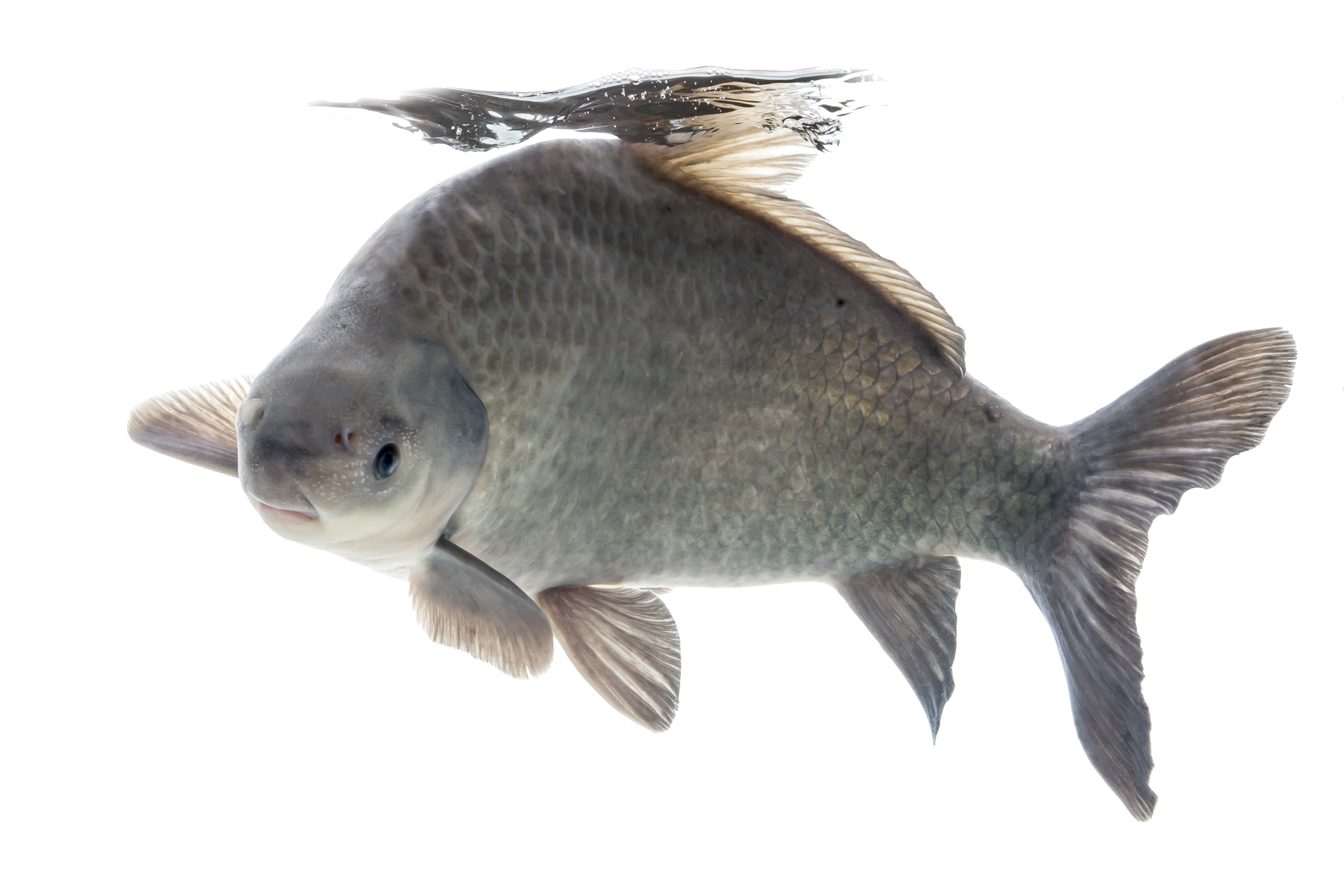
Smallmouth buffalo

The only boat ramp located on Lake Athens is on the northwestern side at Lake Athens Marina. Boat traffic is minimal and allows for calm water for fishing and water skiing. Crappie and largemouth bass are the primary target of recreational fisheries on the lake. Other species include white bass, channel and flathead catfish, spotted gar, smallmouth buffalo, freshwater drum, and bowfin. Largemouth bass on Lake Athens range from 3 to 8 pounds. An 82-pound-3-ounce (37.3 kg) smallmouth buffalo taken from Lake Athens in 1993 stands as the IGFA all-tackle world record for the species.

== Wildlife ==
There are several species of wildlife to be seen on Lake Athens. Alligators, feral hogs, ducks, geese, dove, squirrels, white-tailed deer, and quail are among the many animals at the reservoir.

== Plants ==
Lake Athens is in the Texas Post Oak Savannah wildlife district. It has many types of trees including pecans, elms, oak, eastern red cedar, and walnuts.There are over 200 varieties of wildflowers at Lake Athens. The wildflower season begins in early spring and ends at the first frost of the year. Lake Athens has both submerged and emergent native species of plants. Some of the submerged plants include American pondweed, coontail, and eelgrass. Some of the emergent plants include American lotus, cattail, and water primrose.

=== Invasive species ===
Several invasive aquatic plants have been found in the Lake Athens reservoir. The invasive aquatic plant species giant salvinia was a nuisance on the Lake for more than twenty years but was eradicated in 2019. Other invasive species include alligatorweed, hydrilla, water hyacinth, and crested floating heart.
