= Buffalo, Henderson County, Texas =

Buffalo, Texas
- Unincorporated community
- Location within Texas Location within the United States
- Coordinates: 32°16′21″N 96°16′48″W
- Country: United States
- State: Texas
- County: Henderson
- Elevation: 351 ft (107 m)
- Time zone: UTC-6 (Central (CST))
  - Summer (DST): UTC-5 (CDT)
- Area codes: 430, 903
- GNIS feature ID: 1378068

Buffalo is an unincorporated community in Henderson County, located in the U.S. state of Texas. It was the county seat from 1846 to 1848.
