= Athens Independent School District =

School district in Texas

Location
- 104 Hawn St. Athens, Texas ESC Region 7 USA
- Coordinates: 32°12′12″N 95°51′33″W

District information
- Type: Independent school district
- Grades: Pre-K through 12
- Superintendent: Dr. Janie Sims
- NCES District ID: 4808870

Students and staff
- Athletic conference: UIL Class 4A Football
- District mascot: Hornets
- Colors: Maroon, White

Other information
- Website: Athens ISD

Athens Independent School District is a public school district based in Athens, Texas, United States. The district serves central Henderson County, and small portions of southern Van Zandt and northern Anderson Counties. As of November 2020, it served about 3000 students.

== History ==
In 2018, the district's board of directors decided to move to a four-day week, as a means of attracting staff when they did not have the budgets to pay teachers what other districts could.

The four-day week became effective in fall 2019. This was initially a provisional move for a three-year period, but the district decided to make it the standard schedule in 2022. Around 2022, various groups expressed support for a four-day week in polling that was conducted.

== Academics ==
As of 2011, the school district was rated "academically acceptable" by the Texas Education Agency, which was the same level it had been at since the ratings began in 2004. About 49% of districts in Texas received the same rating in 2011.

== Schools ==
The district has five schools:

- Athens High School (grades 9-12)
- Athens Middle School (grades 6-8)
- Central Elementary (Head Start-grade 5)
- Bel-Air Elementary (Head Start-grade 5)
- South Athens Elementary (Head Start-grade 5)

=== Former schools ===
While the schools were still segregated, black students attended Blackshear High School, which was accredited in 1924. The school was subsequently renamed in honor of R.C. Fisher, who died suddenly at 44. The school closed in 1966. In August 2021, the district broke ground on a memorial to honor the students who attended Athens schools during the era of segregation. Bridges Center, which offered alternative instruction to high-school students, closed in 2015.

== See also ==
- List of school districts in Texas
- List of high schools in Texas
