= Trinidad Independent School District =

School district in Texas

Coordinates: 32°8′12″N 96°5′32″W

Location
- Trinidad, Texas ESC Region 7 USA

District information
- Type: Public
- Grades: Pre-K through 12
- Superintendent: Matt Mizell

Students and staff
- Athletic conference: UIL Class A (six-man football participant)
- District mascot: The Trojan
- Colors: Blue and Gold

Other information
- Principal: Tom Herrin
- Website: www.trinidadisd.com

Trinidad Independent School district is a public school district based in Trinidad, Texas (USA).

The district consists of one campus serving grades PK-12.

== Academic achievement ==
In 2010, the school district was rated "academically unacceptable" by the Texas Education Agency. Again in 2011, the school district was rated "academically unacceptable" by the Texas Education Agency. According to tea.state.tx.us/ 2015 Trinidad School District has the rating of "met standard," with a distinction in Mathematics.

== UIL Academics ==
Trinidad has a very competitive UIL Academic program, and in 2014-2015 competed at the State level in multiple events including One Act Play.

=== Athletics ===
Trinidad High School plays six-man football, volleyball, basketball, softball and track. Six-man Football State Champions (1998)

== See also ==
- List of school districts in Texas
- List of high schools in Texas
