= Romi Mankin =

Estonian physicist (born 1947)

Romi Mankin (born November 7, 1947) is an Estonian physicist known for his work in the field of stochastic processes. Currently he holds a post in Tallinn University as a Professor of Theoretical Physics. He is well published having published many articles in both the Proceedings of the Estonian Academy of Sciences and in the various sections of Physical Review (typically E but also D). and other major journals.

In 2002 he was awarded the Estonian Physical Society Annual Award. This was for his contribution to the development of stochastical physics in the area of noise-induced phase transitions and transfer phenomena.
