= Texas State Highway 155 =

State highway in Texas

State Highway 155
- SH 155 highlighted in red

Route information
- Maintained by TxDOT
- Length: 111.75 mi (179.84 km)
- Existed: by 1931–present

Major junctions
- South end: US 79 / SH 19 in Palestine
- US 175 in Frankston; Loop 49 Toll in Tyler; US 69 in Tyler; US 271 from Tyler to Owentown; I-20 in Owentown; US 80 in Big Sandy; US 271 in Gilmer; US 259 near Gilmer
- North end: Future I-369 / US 59 in Linden

Location
- Country: United States
- State: Texas
- Counties: Anderson, Henderson, Smith, Upshur, Marion, Cass

Highway system
- Highways in Texas; Interstate; US; State; Former; Toll; Loops; Spurs; FM/RM; Park; Rec
← SH 154	→ SH 156

State Highway 155 (SH 155) is a highway in the U.S. state of Texas. It runs from Palestine to Linden as a mostly divided highway by way of Tyler.

From Palestine to Linden, SH 155 is part of the Blue Star Memorial Highway.

== Route description ==
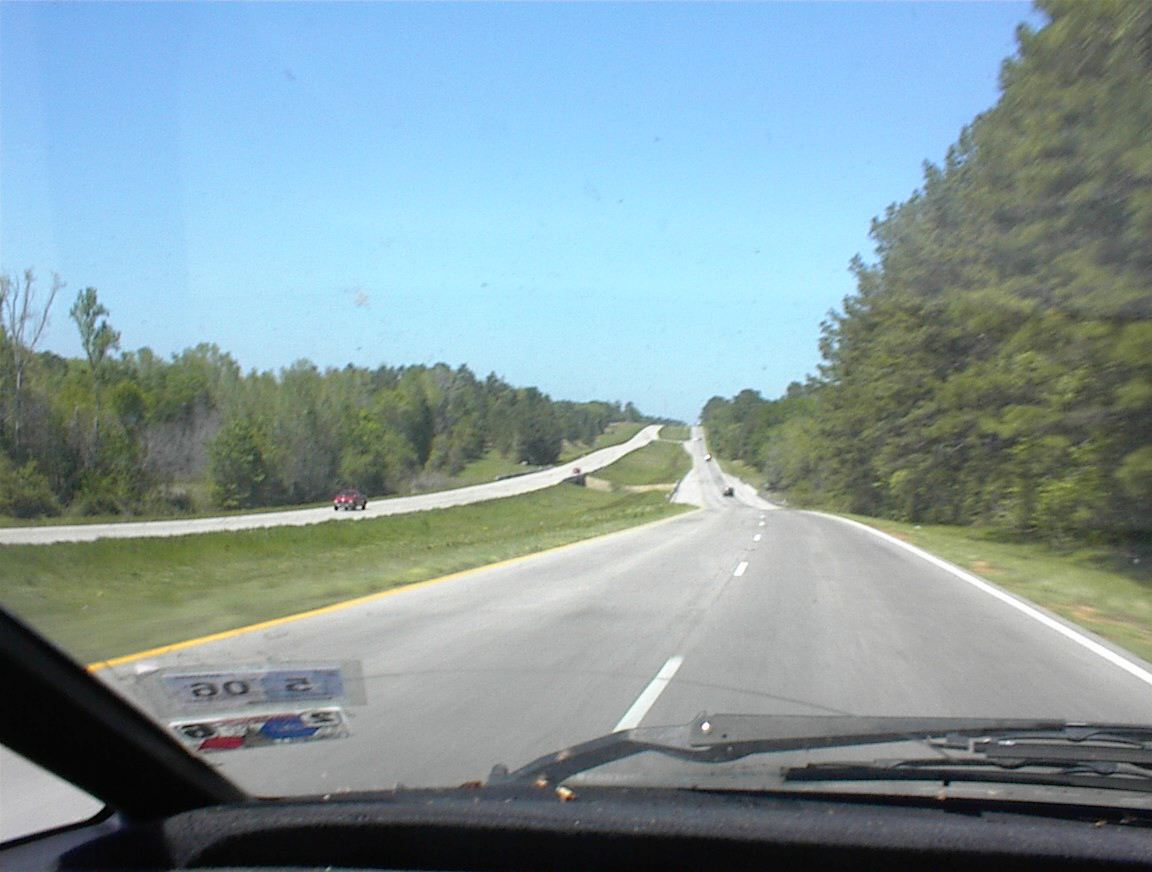
Northbound Texas Route 155 between Palestine and Frankston, Texas, April 2006.

SH 155 begins at US 79 / SH 19 in Palestine northeastward via Frankston to SH 64 at Tyler. Just north of Frankston, a series of three causeways, one measuring a mile in length, crosses Lake Palestine and passes through the resort towns of Coffee City and Dogwood City. Located on the county line, Coffee City is home to a number of liquor stores to serve Tyler residents, due to the fact that Tyler was situated in a dry county until 2012. From Tyler the route continues to the junction of US 271 and SH 31; and then from a point on US 271 northeast of Tyler, northeastward via Big Sandy, Gilmer, Avinger to US 59 (Future I-369) at Linden, a total approximate distance of 123.4 miles (198.6 km). The route is concurrent with US 271 on two separate sections in the city of Tyler and the town of Gilmer.

Nearly the entire route consists of a divided highway posted at 70 mph. For many years, one of the sole remaining two-lane segments and a source of congestion was a 9.5-mile (15.3 km) stretch extending from Frankston to Pert. Construction to build a parallel southbound lane commenced in early 2007 and was completed in 2011, upgrading this stretch of Highway 155 to a full 4-lane divided highway.

== History ==
SH 155 was originally designated on March 19, 1930 on a route from Gilmer to Marshall. On December 22, 1936, it was extended southwest to Tyler. On September 26, 1939, the section from Marshall to Gilmer was transferred to SH 154 when it was extended east from Quitman. The route was extended south to Palestine and north to Linden on May 18, 1944. On August 28, 1958, SH 155 was signed, but not designated, along Spur 226. On August 29, 1990, Spur 226 was cancelled and transferred to SH 155 officially. Spur 226 was reused for a route in Terrell on July 11, 2017.

== Major intersections ==
County	Location	mi	km	Destinations	Notes
Anderson	Palestine	0.00	0.00	US 79 / SH 19 (Palestine Avenue)	
Anderson	Palestine	0.70– 0.80	1.13– 1.29	Loop 256	Diamond interchange
Anderson	Frankston	21.30	34.28	US 175	
Henderson	Ledbetter Bay	26.30– 26.90	42.33– 43.29	Bridge	
Henderson	Coffee City	27.30	43.94	FM 3506 north	Southern terminus of FM 3506
Lake Palestine		27.80– 28.90	44.74– 46.51	Bridge	
Smith	Tyler	37.00– 37.10	59.55– 59.71	Loop 49 Toll	Diamond interchange
Smith	Tyler	40.20	64.70	SH 57 east (Grande Boulevard)	
Smith	Tyler	42.10	67.75	Loop 323 – Airport	
Smith	Tyler	44.50	71.62	US 69 north / SH 64 west / SH 110 north (Glenwood Boulevard) – Airport	Southern terminus of concurrency with US 69 / SH 64 / SH 110
Smith	Tyler	45.20	72.74	US 69 south (Broadway)	terminus of concurrency with US 69
Smith	Tyler	45.80	73.71	SH 64 east (5th Street) / SH 110 south (Beckham Avenue)	Northern terminus of concurrency with SH 64 / SH 110
Smith	Tyler	46.80	75.32	SH 31 south / US 271 (Front Street)	Southern terminus of concurrency with US 271
Smith	Tyler	50.00	80.47	Loop 323	
Smith	Tyler	50.70	81.59	To Loop 323	
Smith	Owentown	54.90	88.35	US 271 north – Gladewater	Northern terminus of concurrency with US 271
Smith	Owentown	56.90– 57.10	91.57– 91.89	I-20 – Dallas, Longview	Diamond interchange; exit 567 on I-20
Upshur	Big Sandy	67.40	108.47	US 80 west – Mineola	Southern terminus of concurrency with US 80
Upshur	Big Sandy	68.30	109.92	US 80 east – Longview	Northern terminus of concurrency with US 80
Upshur	Gilmer	81.70	131.48	US 271 south – Gladewater	Southern terminus of concurrency with US 271
Upshur	Gilmer	82.10	132.13	SH 300 south	Northern terminus of SH 300
Upshur	Gilmer	82.90	133.41	SH 154 (Marshall Street)	
Upshur	Gilmer	83.20	133.90	US 271 north	Northern terminus of concurrency with US 271
Upshur		98.80– 98.90	159.00– 159.16	US 259 – Longview, Daingerfield	Diamond interchange
Lake O' the Pines		100.50– 100.70	161.74– 162.06	Bridge	
Marion		102.80	165.44	FM 729 – Lone Star, Jefferson	
Cass	Avinger	109.90	176.87	SH 49 – Hughes Springs, Daingerfield, Jefferson	
Cass	Linden	123.30	198.43	SH 8 north – New Boston	Southern terminus of SH 8
Cass	Linden	123.40	198.59	US 59 (Future I-369) – Business District, Atlanta, Jefferson	U.S. 59 is the future Interstate 369
1.000 mi = 1.609 km; 1.000 km = 0.621 mi: Concurrency terminus

== See also ==
- List of state highways in Texas
- List of highways numbered 155
