= Henderson County, Texas =

County in Texas, United States

- County
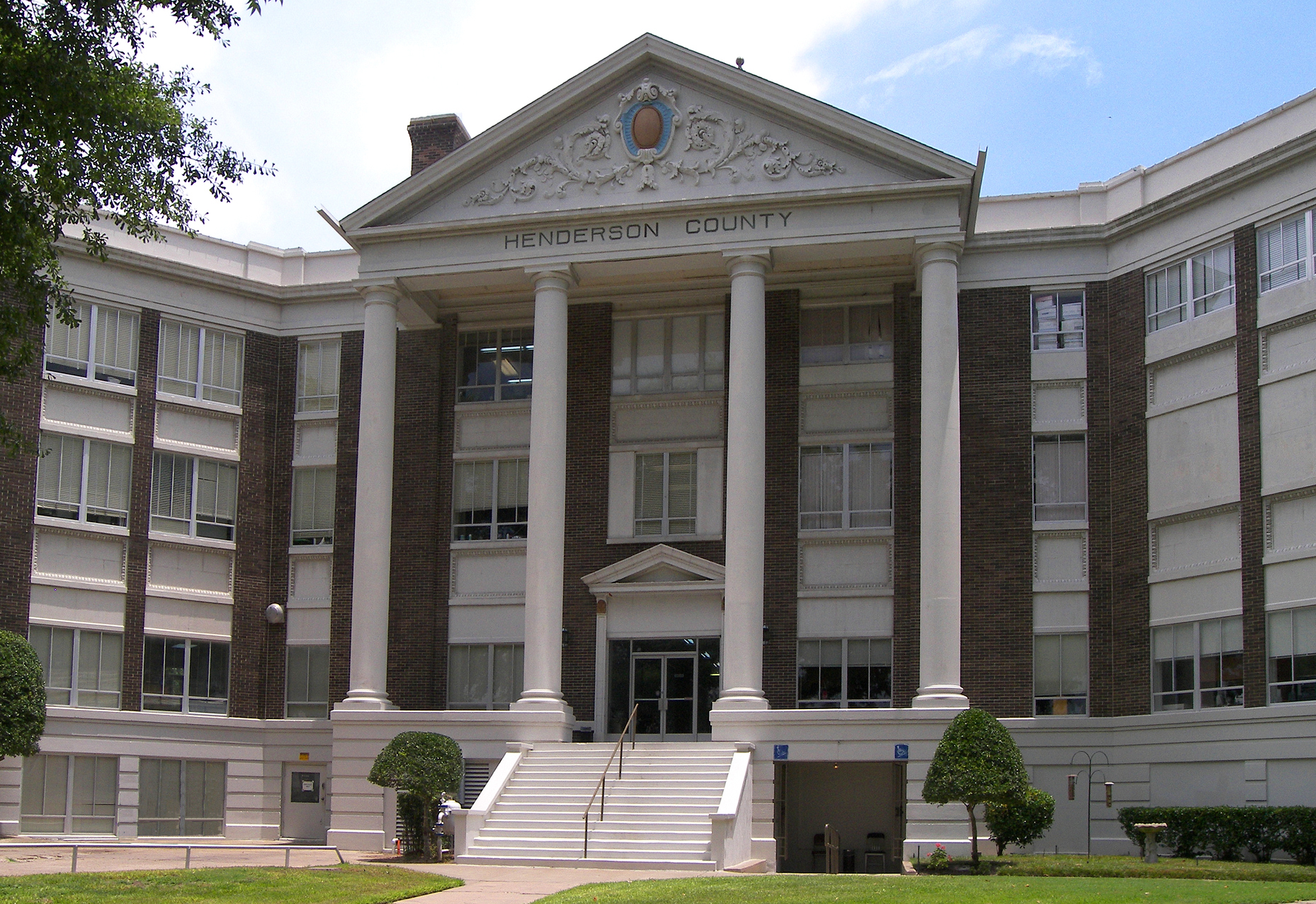
- The Henderson County Courthouse in Athens

- Location within the U.S. state of Texas
- Coordinates: 32°13′N 95°51′W
- Country: United States
- State: Texas
- Founded: 1846
- Named for: James Pinckney Henderson
- Seat: Athens
- Largest city: Athens

Area
  - Total: 948 sq mi (2,460 km^{2})
  - Land: 874 sq mi (2,260 km^{2})
  - Water: 75 sq mi (190 km^{2}) 7.9%

Population (2020)
  - Total: 82,150
  - Estimate (2025): 88,595 ▲
  - Density: 87/sq mi (34/km^{2})
- Time zone: UTC−6 (Central)
  - Summer (DST): UTC−5 (CDT)
- Congressional district: 5th
- Website: www.henderson-county.com

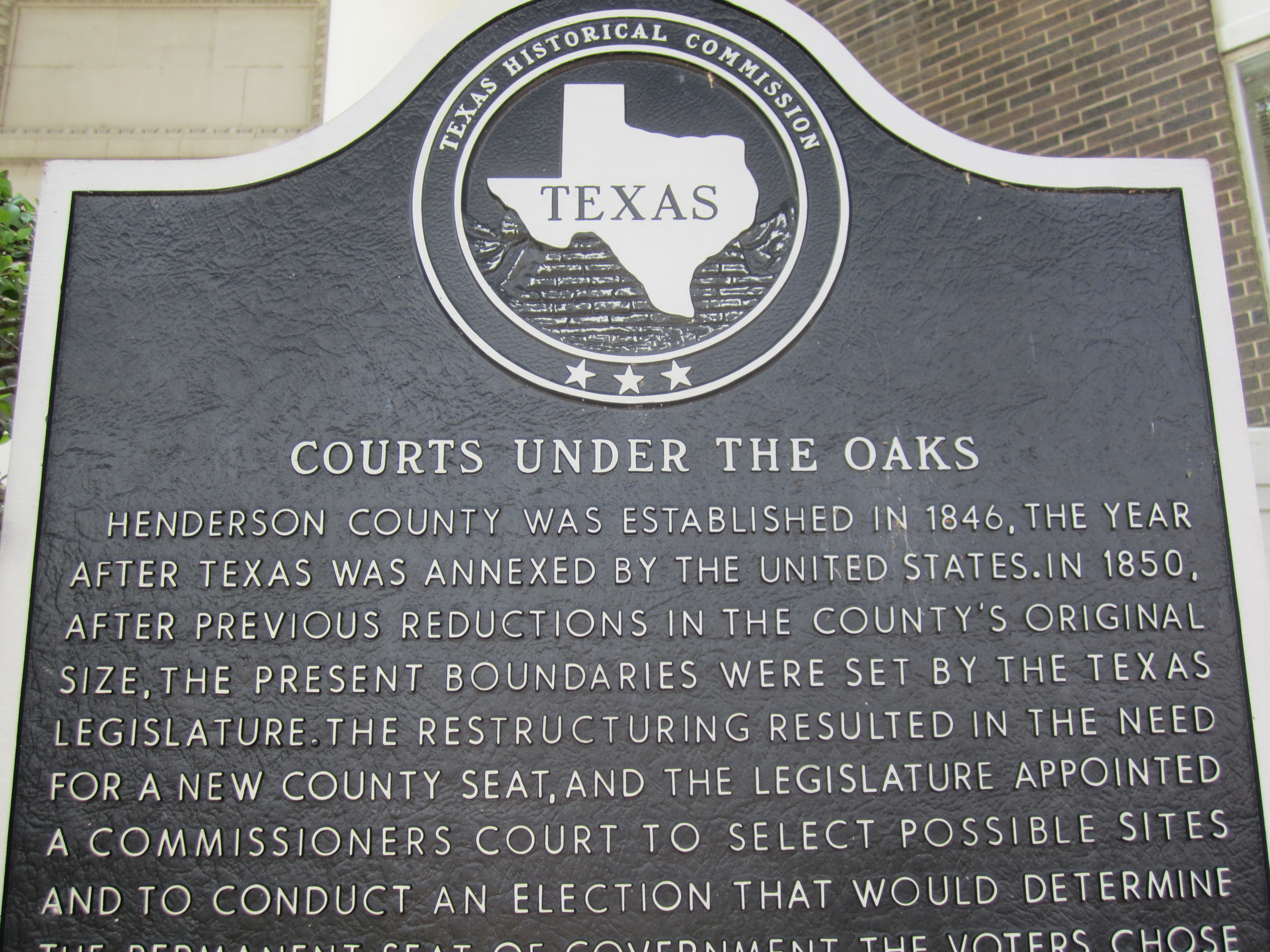
"Courts Under the Oaks" in Athens

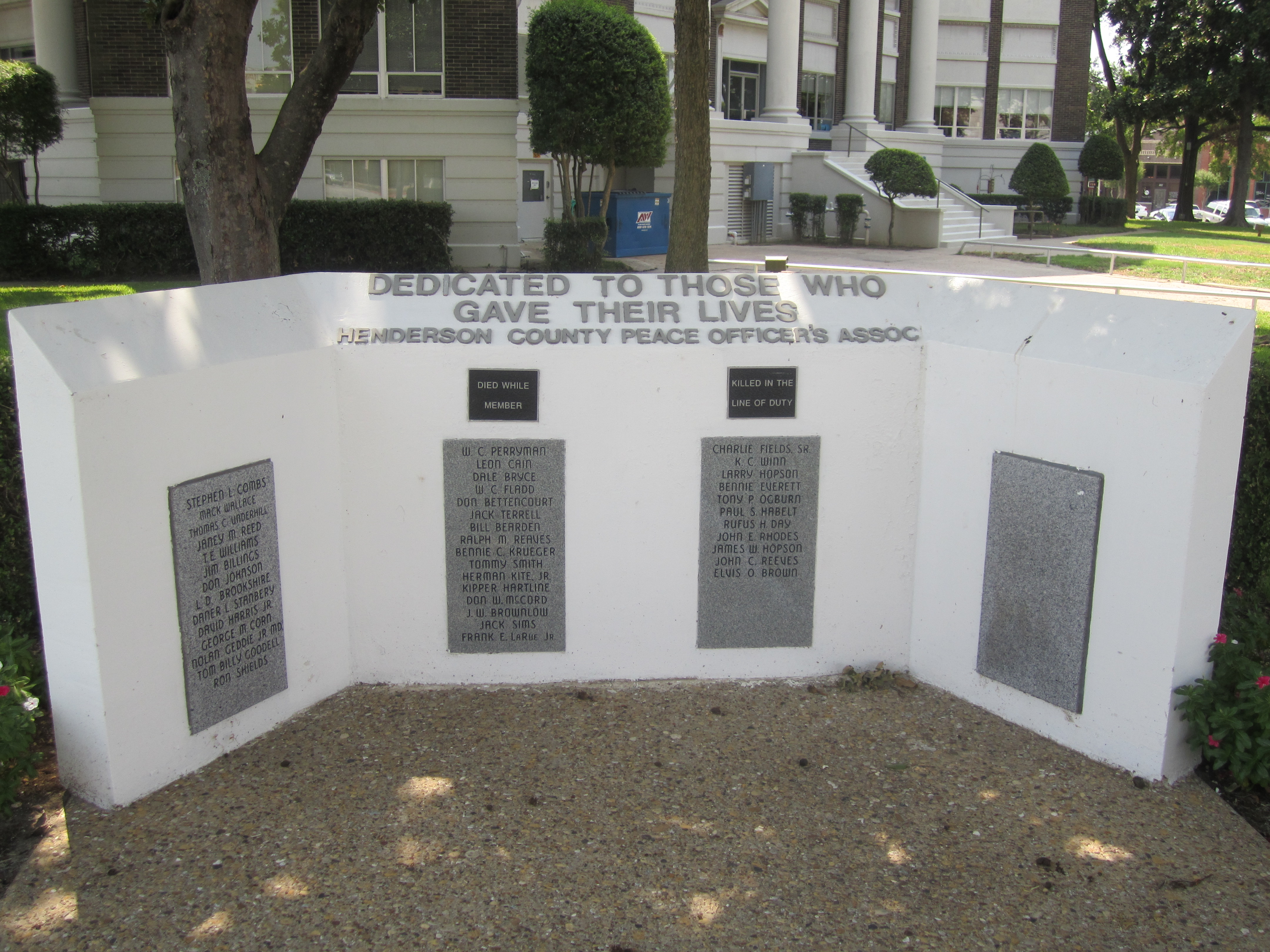
Henderson County Peace Officers Association monument

Henderson County is a county in the U.S. state of Texas. As of the 2020 census, its population was 82,150. The county seat is Athens. The county is named in honor of James Pinckney Henderson, the first attorney general of the Republic of Texas, and secretary of state for the republic. He later served as the first governor of Texas. Henderson County was established in 1846, the year after Texas gained statehood. Its first town was Buffalo, laid out in 1847. Henderson County comprises the Athens micropolitan statistical area, which is also included in the Dallas-Fort Worth combined statistical area.

== Geography ==
According to the U.S. Census Bureau, the county has a total area of 948 sq mi (2,460 km^{2}), of which 75 sq mi (190 km^{2}) (7.9%) are covered by water.

=== Major highways ===
- U.S. Highway 175
- State Highway 19
- State Highway 31
- State Highway 155
- State Highway 198
- State Highway 274
- State Highway 334
- Loop 7
- Loop 60

=== Lakes ===
- Cedar Creek Reservoir
- Lake Palestine

=== Adjacent counties ===
- Kaufman County (north)
- Van Zandt County (north)
- Smith County (east)
- Cherokee County (southeast)
- Anderson County (south)
- Freestone County (southwest)
- Navarro County (west)
- Ellis County (northwest)

== Communities ==
=== Cities ===
- Athens (county seat)
- Brownsboro
- Chandler
- Eustace
- Gun Barrel City
- Log Cabin
- Malakoff
- Moore Station
- Murchison
- Seven Points (small part in Kaufman County)
- Star Harbor
- Tool
- Trinidad

=== Towns ===
- Berryville
- Caney City
- Coffee City
- Enchanted Oaks
- Mabank (mostly in Kaufman County)
- Payne Springs
- Poynor

=== Census-designated place ===
- Sunrise Shores

=== Unincorporated communities ===
- Aley
- Antioch
- Baxter
- Bethel
- Big Rock
- Buffalo
- Crescent Heights
- Cross Roads
- Dauphin
- Evelyn
- Fincastle
- Harmony
- LaRue
- Leagueville
- Mankin
- New Hope
- New York
- Opelika
- Pauline
- Pickens
- Pine Grove
- Ruth Springs
- Shady Oaks
- Stockard
- Summer Hill
- Union Hill
- Virginia Hill

=== Ghost towns ===
- Centreville
- Corinth

== Demographics ==
Historical population
Census	Pop.	Note	%±
1850	1,237		—
1860	4,595		271.5%
1870	6,786		47.7%
1880	9,735		43.5%
1890	12,285		26.2%
1900	19,970		62.6%
1910	20,131		0.8%
1920	28,327		40.7%
1930	30,583		8.0%
1940	31,822		4.1%
1950	23,405		−26.5%
1960	21,786		−6.9%
1970	26,466		21.5%
1980	42,606		61.0%
1990	58,543		37.4%
2000	73,277		25.2%
2010	78,532		7.2%
2020	82,150		4.6%
2025 (est.)	88,595	▲	7.8%
U.S. Decennial Census; 1850–2010 2010–2020

=== Racial and ethnic composition ===
Henderson County, Texas – Racial and ethnic composition Note: the US Census treats Hispanic/Latino as an ethnic category. This table excludes Latinos from the racial categories and assigns them to a separate category. Hispanics/Latinos may be of any race.
Race / Ethnicity (NH = Non-Hispanic)	Pop 1980	Pop 1990	Pop 2000	Pop 2010	Pop 2020	% 1980	% 1990	% 2000	% 2010	% 2020
White alone (NH)	37,241	51,135	62,124	63,494	61,854	87.41%	87.35%	84.78%	80.85%	75.29%
Black or African American alone (NH)	4,562	4,727	4,811	4,813	4,705	10.71%	8.07%	6.57%	6.13%	5.73%
Native American or Alaska Native alone (NH)	92	169	334	349	414	0.22%	0.29%	0.46%	0.44%	0.50%
Asian alone (NH)	60	129	220	318	510	0.14%	0.22%	0.30%	0.40%	0.62%
Native Hawaiian or Pacific Islander alone (NH)	x	x	19	27	31	x	x	0.03%	0.03%	0.04%
Other race alone (NH)	32	15	24	76	211	0.08%	0.03%	0.03%	0.10%	0.26%
Mixed race or Multiracial (NH)	x	x	674	965	3,183	x	x	0.92%	1.23%	3.87%
Hispanic or Latino (any race)	619	2,368	5,071	8,490	11,242	1.45%	4.04%	6.92%	10.81%	13.68%
Total	42,606	58,543	73,277	78,532	82,150	100.00%	100.00%	100.00%	100.00%	100.00%

=== 2020 census ===
As of the 2020 census, the county had a population of 82,150 and a median age of 45.0 years; 21.0% of residents were under 18 and 22.7% were 65 or older. For every 100 females there were 96.7 males, and for every 100 females age 18 and over there were 93.9 males age 18 and over.

The racial makeup of the county was 78.5% White, 5.8% Black or African American, 0.8% American Indian and Alaska Native, 0.6% Asian, <0.1% Native Hawaiian and Pacific Islander, 5.8% from some other race, and 8.3% from two or more races. Hispanic or Latino residents of any race comprised 13.7% of the population. The non-Hispanic white share remained the majority even as the Hispanic or Latino population continued to grow, reflecting nationwide demographic trends over the 2010s.

34.1% of residents lived in urban areas, while 65.9% lived in rural areas.

There were 32,748 households in the county, of which 27.2% had children under the age of 18 living in them. Of all households, 49.4% were married-couple households, 18.6% had a male householder with no spouse or partner present, and 26.1% had a female householder with no spouse or partner present. About 27.4% of all households were made up of individuals and 14.2% had someone living alone who was 65 years of age or older.

There were 40,643 housing units, of which 19.4% were vacant. Among occupied housing units, 74.4% were owner-occupied and 25.6% were renter-occupied. The homeowner vacancy rate was 2.4% and the rental vacancy rate was 7.9%.

=== 2000 census ===
As of the 2000 census, 73,277 people, 28,804 households, and 20,969 families were residing in the county. Its population density was 84 people/mi^{2} (32 people/km^{2}). The 35,935 housing units averaged 41 units per square mile (16/km^{2}). The racial makeup of the county was 88.50% White, 6.61% African American, 0.54% Native American, 0.30% Asian, 2.75% from other races, and 1.30% from two or more races. About 6.92% of the population was Hispanic or Latino of any race.

== Government ==
- Commissioner Pct. 1: Wendy Spivey
- Commissioner Pct. 2: Scott Tuley
- Commissioner Pct. 3: Charles "Chuck" McHam
- Commissioner Pct. 4: Mark Richardson

=== Politics ===
United States presidential election results for Henderson County, Texas
Year	Republican		Democratic		Third party(ies)	
Year	No.	%	No.	%	No.	%
1912	137	6.84%	1,370	68.36%	497	24.80%
1916	268	11.11%	1,790	74.18%	355	14.71%
1920	538	18.62%	1,684	58.29%	667	23.09%
1924	405	9.41%	3,819	88.73%	80	1.86%
1928	1,128	39.52%	1,726	60.48%	0	0.00%
1932	219	5.82%	3,522	93.67%	19	0.51%
1936	260	7.38%	3,259	92.45%	6	0.17%
1940	803	16.34%	4,111	83.66%	0	0.00%
1944	427	10.12%	3,219	76.28%	574	13.60%
1948	540	12.24%	3,669	83.14%	204	4.62%
1952	2,534	36.33%	4,439	63.65%	1	0.01%
1956	2,479	44.51%	3,065	55.04%	25	0.45%
1960	2,521	42.23%	3,411	57.14%	38	0.64%
1964	1,988	29.61%	4,697	69.96%	29	0.43%
1968	2,315	29.19%	3,119	39.32%	2,498	31.49%
1972	6,263	69.49%	2,741	30.41%	9	0.10%
1976	4,658	36.01%	8,245	63.73%	34	0.26%
1980	7,903	48.47%	8,199	50.29%	203	1.25%
1984	12,725	63.38%	7,302	36.37%	49	0.24%
1988	11,005	52.61%	9,819	46.94%	94	0.45%
1992	8,368	34.49%	9,105	37.53%	6,788	27.98%
1996	10,345	45.43%	10,085	44.29%	2,342	10.28%
2000	16,607	64.80%	8,704	33.96%	316	1.23%
2004	20,210	70.05%	8,505	29.48%	134	0.46%
2008	20,857	71.94%	7,913	27.29%	223	0.77%
2012	21,231	76.85%	6,106	22.10%	290	1.05%
2016	23,650	78.72%	5,669	18.87%	726	2.42%
2020	28,911	79.50%	7,060	19.41%	397	1.09%
2024	31,379	81.42%	6,919	17.95%	242	0.63%

United States Senate election results for Henderson County, Texas1
Year	Republican		Democratic		Third party(ies)	
Year	No.	%	No.	%	No.	%
2024	30,047	78.60%	7,453	19.50%	726	1.90%

United States Senate election results for Henderson County, Texas2
Year	Republican		Democratic		Third party(ies)	
Year	No.	%	No.	%	No.	%
2020	28,717	79.56%	6,672	18.48%	707	1.96%

Texas Gubernatorial election results for Henderson County
Year	Republican		Democratic		Third party(ies)	
Year	No.	%	No.	%	No.	%
2022	22,909	81.81%	4,798	17.13%	295	1.05%

== Media ==
Henderson County is part of the Dallas/Fort Worth DMA. Local media outlets are: KDFW-TV, KXAS-TV, WFAA-TV, KTVT-TV, KERA-TV, KTXA-TV, KDFI-TV, KDAF-TV, and KFWD-TV. Other nearby stations that provide coverage for Henderson County come from the Tyler/Longview/Jacksonville market and they include: KLTV, KTRE-TV, KYTX-TV, KFXK-TV, KCEB-TV, and KETK-TV.

Newspaper coverage of the area can be found in the Athens Daily Review, based in Athens; The Monitor is published in Mabank, which is primarily in Kaufman County, but also covers news in parts of Henderson County, as well.

== Crime ==
Paul Knight of the Houston Press said in a 2009 article that some people blamed the development of the artificial Cedar Creek Lake, which opened in 1965, and development of the area surrounding the lake for the initial influx of crime and recreational drugs into the county and the East Texas region. Carroll Dyson, a retired pilot and Henderson County resident interviewed by the Houston Press, said in 2009 that the lake attracted "white flight" from metropolitan areas. Dyson added, "When all your rich people from Dallas and Houston move out here, the thieves are just drawn to them." Ray Nutt, the sheriff of Henderson County, said that the area around the lake has "a lot of good people," yet it was also where "a lot of criminals tend to flow."

== Education ==
School districts include:

- Athens Independent School District
- Brownsboro Independent School District
- Cross Roads Independent School District
- Eustace Independent School District
- Frankston Independent School District
- Kemp Independent School District
- LaPoyner Independent School District
- Mabank Independent School District
- Malakoff Independent School District
- Murchison Independent School District
- Trinidad Independent School District
- Van Independent School District

Henderson County is in the Trinity Valley Community College district service area.

== See also ==
- National Register of Historic Places listings in Henderson County, Texas
- Recorded Texas Historic Landmarks in Henderson County
- Clay Smothers
