= Texas State Highway 274 =

State highway in Texas

State Highway 274
- SH 274, highlighted in red

Route information
- Maintained by TxDOT
- Length: 23.002 mi (37.018 km)
- Existed: 1938–present

Major junctions
- South end: SH 31 in Trinidad
- North end: US 175 in Kemp

Location
- Country: United States
- State: Texas

Highway system
- Highways in Texas; Interstate; US; State; Former; Toll; Loops; Spurs; FM/RM; Park; Rec
← SH 273	→ SH 275

State Highway 274 (SH 274) is a Texas state highway that runs from Kemp south to Trinidad along the western side of Cedar Creek Reservoir. The route was designated on August 1, 1938 along its current route.

== Junction list ==
County	Location	mi	km	Destinations	Notes
Henderson	Trinidad			SH 31 / FM 734	
Henderson	Tool			FM 3225	
Henderson	Seven Points			SH 334 / FM 85	
Kaufman				FM 3396	
Kaufman	Kemp			FM 148	
Kaufman	Kemp			Bus. US 175	
Kaufman	Kemp			US 175	
1.000 mi = 1.609 km; 1.000 km = 0.621 mi
