= Trinidad, Texas =

- City
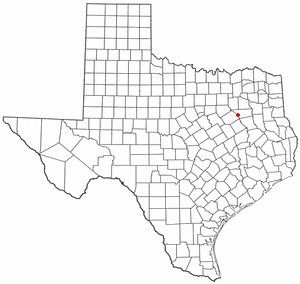
- Location of Trinidad, Texas

- Coordinates: 32°8′51″N 96°5′27″W
- Country: United States
- State: Texas
- County: Henderson

Area
  - Total: 15.12 sq mi (39.17 km^{2})
  - Land: 14.90 sq mi (38.60 km^{2})
  - Water: 0.22 sq mi (0.58 km^{2})
- Elevation: 302 ft (92 m)

Population (2024)
  - Total: 860
  - Density: 58.4/sq mi (22.54/km^{2})
- Time zone: UTC-6 (Central (CST))
  - Summer (DST): UTC-5 (CDT)
- ZIP code: 75163
- Area codes: 903, 430
- FIPS code: 48-73652
- GNIS feature ID: 1381023
- Website: trinidadtexas.gov

Trinidad is a city in Henderson County, Texas, United States, near the Trinity River from which the town's name was derived. Its population was 860 at the 2020 census, down from 886 at the 2010 census.

Modern Trinidad is not to be confused with Santísima Trinidad de Salcedo, a town in the Spanish Texas period. While both were along the Trinidad river and derived their name from it, the Spanish town was considerably further downstream, near present-day Madisonville, Texas. That town was destroyed and abandoned in 1813. (See Gutiérrez–Magee Expedition.)

== History ==
Around 1840, O. M. Airhart ran a ferry across the Trinity River (originally called the Trinidad River), and Zach Smith operated a ferry four miles north of the present townsite. A general store and a saloon were located there by 1844, when it became known as Trinity Switch. In 1880, it became a station on the St. Louis Southwestern Rail Road. That same year, the town's name was changed to Trinidad because of a conflict with another post office with the name Trinity Switch; the Trinidad post office, though, did not actually open until the next year. Five businesses and a population of 70 were reported by 1910. Texas Power and Light opened a plant on the Trinity River in the 1920s, and manufacturing of chemical fertilizers began in a plant there. By 1940, the population was 550, with 16 businesses in the community. Trinidad had 1,056 residents in the 1990 census, but the population had grown to 1,091 by 2000.

=== 2026 law enforcement controversy ===
In May 2026, resident Jennifer Combs posted images to Facebook showing dirty water coming from her faucets in her Trinidad home, and claimed that people had been hospitalized due to the city's water making them ill. According to local news, no hospitalizations due to the water quality were reported. Trinidad police officers arrested Combs and charged her with felony false alarm as a result of the posts. Winston Noles, a YouTube First Amendment auditor, began protesting against Combs' arrest outside of the Trinidad City Hall, and was also arrested and charged with disorderly conduct.

A Henderson County grand jury declined to indict either Noles or Combs, with Combs filing a federal lawsuit against the city of Trinidad. Two former Trinidad city employees also filed a lawsuit against the city, claiming that they were fired in retaliation for "refusing to lie" about Combs' and Noles' arrests on behalf of the Trinidad Police Department. Municipal judge Shellena Bivens later filed a lawsuit against the city as well, claiming that she was fired by the city council in retaliation for dropping the charges against Noles.

Trinidad police chief Charles Gregory resigned in June 2026 due to controversy over the arrests. The Texas Commission on Law Enforcement began investigating the arrests and stripped the Trinidad Police Department of its law enforcement license after finding significant deficiencies in the department's procedures. As a result, the Trinidad Police Department disbanded in September 2026.

== Geography ==
Trinidad is located along the western edge of Henderson County at 32°08′51″N 96°05′27″W (32.147365, –96.090791). The western border of the city follows the Trinity River, which forms the Navarro County line. The eastern border of the city follows Cedar Creek, a tributary of the Trinity, and the northern boundary of the city in part follows the dam at the south end of Cedar Creek Reservoir.

Texas State Highway 31 passes through Trinidad, leading east 14 miles (23 km) to Athens, the Henderson county seat, and west 23 miles (37 km) to Corsicana, the Navarro County seat.Texas State Highway 274 leads north from Trinidad up the west side of Cedar Creek Reservoir 23 miles (37 km) to Kemp.

According to the United States Census Bureau, the city has a total area of 15.1 square miles (39.2 km^{2}), of which 0.2 sq mi (0.6 km^{2}), or 1.47%, is covered by water.

=== Climate ===
The climate in this area is characterized by hot, humid summers and generally mild to cool winters. According to the Köppen climate classification, Trinidad has a humid subtropical climate, Cfa on climate maps.

== Demographics ==
Historical population
Census	Pop.	Note	%±
1960	786		—
1970	1,079		37.3%
1980	1,130		4.7%
1990	1,056		−6.5%
2000	1,091		3.3%
2010	886		−18.8%
2020	860		−2.9%
U.S. Decennial Census

=== 2020 census ===
As of the 2020 census, Trinidad had 860 people, 361 households, and 212 families living in the city. The median age was 43.4 years, with 23.3% of residents under 18 and 18.6% were 65 or older. For every 100 females, there were 88.6 males, and for every 100 females 18 and over, there were 76.9 males 18 and over.

None of residents lived in urban areas, while 100.0% lived in rural areas.

Of the 361 households, 30.2% had children under 18 living in them, 39.1% were married-couple households, 18.3% had a male householder with no spouse or partner present, and 36.6% had a female householder with no spouse or partner present. About 30.5% of all households were made up of individuals, and 15.8% had someone living alone who was 65 or older.

Of the 409 housing units, 11.7% were vacant. The homeowner vacancy rate was 0.4% and the rental vacancy rate was 12.9%.

Racial composition as of the 2020 census
Race	Number	Percentage
White	591	68.7%
Black or African American	134	15.6%
American Indian and Alaska Native	5	0.6%
Asian	5	0.6%
Native Hawaiian and other Pacific Islander	1	0.1%
Some other race	28	3.3%
Two or more races	96	11.2%
Hispanic or Latino (of any race)	100	11.6%

=== 2000 census ===
As of the census of 2000, 1,091 people, 430 households, and 297 families were residing in the city. The population density was 73.4 inhabitants per square mile (28.3/km^{2}). The 474 housing units had an average density of 31.9 per square mile (12.3/km^{2}). The racial makeup of the city was 83.13% White, 13.02% African American, 0.55% Native American, 2.47% from other races, and 0.82% from two or more races. Hispanics or Latinos of any race were 6.60% of the population.

Of the 430 households, 34.2% had children under 18 living with them, 47.2% were married couples living together, 17.9% had a female householder with no husband present, and 30.7% were not families. About 28.6% of all households were made up of individuals, and 14.4% had someone living alone who was 65 or older. The average household size was 2.54, and the average family size was 3.14.

In the city, the age distribution was 29.5% under 18, 9.3% from 18 to 24, 25.5% from 25 to 44, 20.6% from 45 to 64, and 15.1% who were 65 or older. The median age was 34 years. For every 100 females, there were 89.7 males. For every 100 females 18 and over, there were 81.8 males.

The median income in the city for a household was $46,379 and for a family was $65,568. Males had a median income of $28,438 versus $18,958 for females. The per capita income for the city was $114,270. About 15.5% of families and 1.0% of the population were below the poverty line, including 20.2% of those under 18 and 20.4% of those 65 or over.

== Education ==
The city is served by the Trinidad Independent School District.

Henderson County is in the Trinity Valley Community College district service area.
