= Cedar Creek Reservoir (Texas) =

Artificial lake in east Texas completed 1965

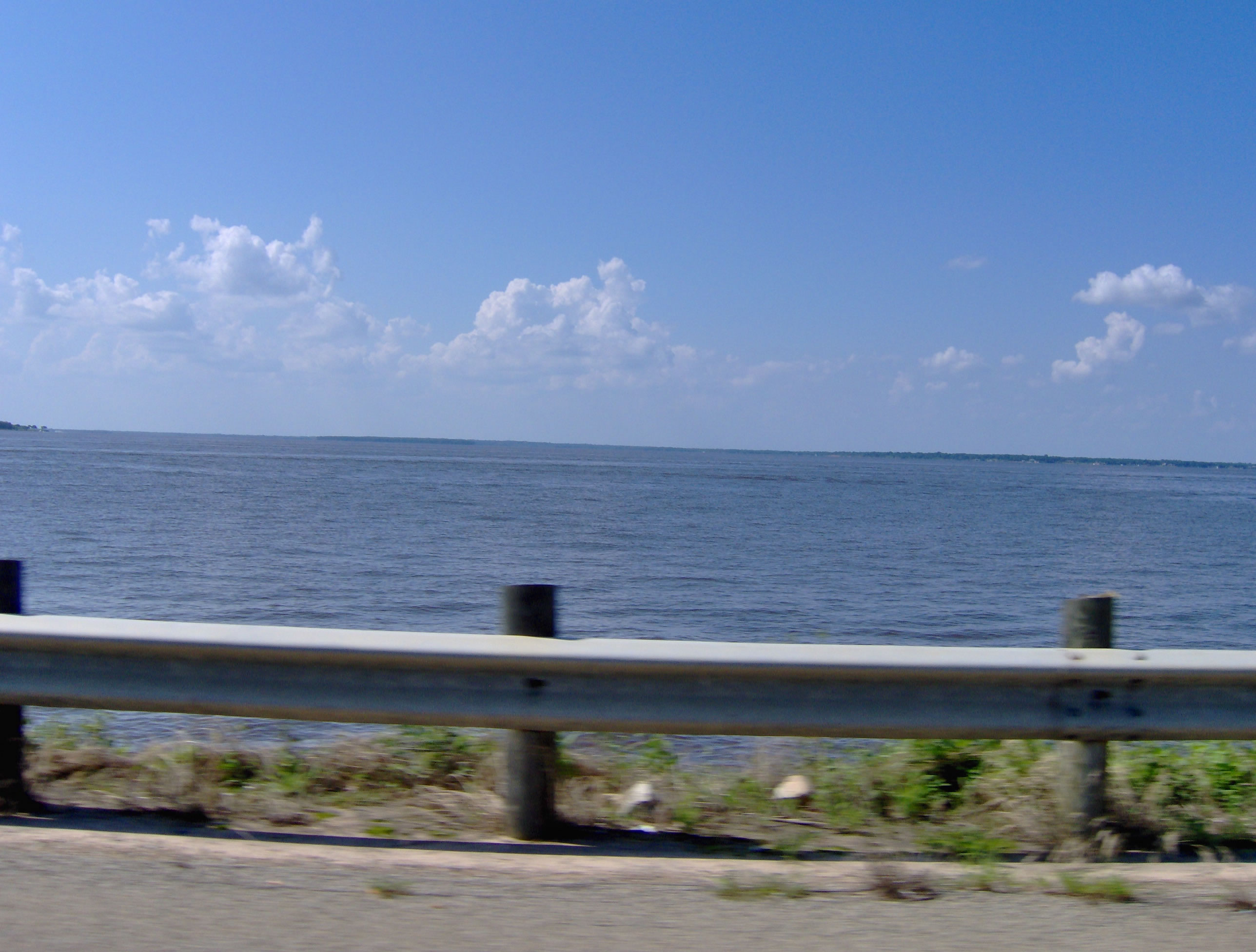
- View of lake looking north

- Location within Texas Location within the United States
- Location: Henderson and Kaufman Counties, Texas
- Coordinates: 32.3637°N 96.1747°W
- Lake type: Artificial lake
- Catchment area: 1,000 sq mi (2,600 km^{2})
- Basin countries: United States
- Max. length: about 18.6 mi (29.9 km)
- Max. width: about 2.3 mi (3.70 km)
- Max. depth: 62 ft (19 m)
- Surface elevation: 322 ft (98 m)
- Islands: 3
- Settlements: 14

Cedar Creek Reservoir is a reservoir located in Henderson and Kaufman Counties, Texas (USA), 50 miles (80 km) southeast of Dallas. It is built on Cedar Creek, which flows into the Trinity River. Floodwaters are discharged through a gated spillway into a discharge channel that connects to the Trinity River.

== Description ==
The lake has a surface area of 34,000 acres (53 sq mi; 140 km^{2}),and a drainage area of 1,007 square miles (2,610 km^{2}). The Texas Parks and Wildlife Department maintains three islands, totalling of 160 acres (65 ha), as a wildlife management area for aquatic birds. The lake is owned by the Tarrant Regional Water District, and supplies water to Fort Worth and other cities and water districts in Tarrant and Johnson Counties. Construction on the lake began in 1961, and was completed in 1965.

== History ==
Cedar Creek Lake is a fourth water source for Tarrant Regional Water District's water supply. Its normal system capacity is 322.00 ft (98.15 m) above sea level. When the lake gets over that point, gates from the spillway are opened, releasing water.

Over the course of 2005 and 2006, North Texas experienced drought conditions, with the lake falling to a record low of 313.96 ft (95.70 m) on December 12, 2006 – 8.04 ft (2.45 m) below normal, below the previous record low of 6.22 ft (1.90 m), set on May 8, 1981. That afternoon, the lake received over 4 in (100 mm) of rain, the first significant rainfall since April 2006. Rain continued through December 2006, followed by huge rainstorms throughout January 2007, then melting snow and ice in February, such that by March 31, 2007, the lake was at 322.12 ft (98.18 m) and the flood gates were open for the first time since April 2005. With the end of the drought, by June 30, 2007, water levels also returned to normal in Lake Benbrook, Lake Worth, Lake Arlington, Richland-Chambers Reservoir, Eagle Mountain, and Lake Bridgeport; this was the first time since May 15, 2001, that all seven of the Tarrant regional water district lakes were full. With rain continuing, on July 5, 2007, Cedar Creek lake rose to 1.5 feet (46 cm) over, beating the old 1.47 ft (0.45 m) record set in November 2001.

== Settlements ==
Towns on or near the lake include Kemp, Mabank, Gun Barrel City, Payne Springs, Enchanted Oaks, Eustace, Caney City, Malakoff, Star Harbor, Trinidad, Tool, and Seven Points. Its proximity to the Dallas-Fort Worth Metroplex makes it a popular weekend getaway.

== Creeks and rivers ==
Cedar Creek Reservoir was built on Cedar Creek, a tributary to the Trinity River. The dam is at the south end of the lake in the town of Malakoff. The spillway on the west side of the lake lets water into a canal to the Trinity River which is located in Tool, Texas. Other major creeks that contribute to the inflow are Caney Creek, Clear Creek, and King's Creek.

== Fishing ==
The predominant fish species of Cedar Creek Lake are blue catfish, channel catfish, flathead catfish, largemouth bass, white bass, hybrid striped bass, and crappie. The best fishing areas for largemouth bass are in the southern portion of the lake, where the water is clearer, especially the southern third of the lake in the large coves and inlets on Texas rig worms and top waters. Docks are a main place to catch the large bass. Always use Texas rigged worms, frogs, buzzbaits, and crankbaits. Jigs are a huge plus at the docks. Grass beds can also be found in the southern end producing plenty of largemouth bass. spinner baits and worms The lake's record largemouth bass weighed 14.65 pounds (6.65 kg). Catfish can be found everywhere, with more blues than channels. Fishing is particularly good in the spring and into summer. Due to the many smaller streams, creeks, and run-offs flowing into the lake, running jug lines in the channels of the many coves using goldfish, shad, and small sunfish makes for very good blue catfish and flathead (yellow) catfish fishing grounds.

== See also ==
- List of dams and reservoirs in Texas
- Trinity River Authority
