= Lake Palestine =

Reservoir in Texas, United States

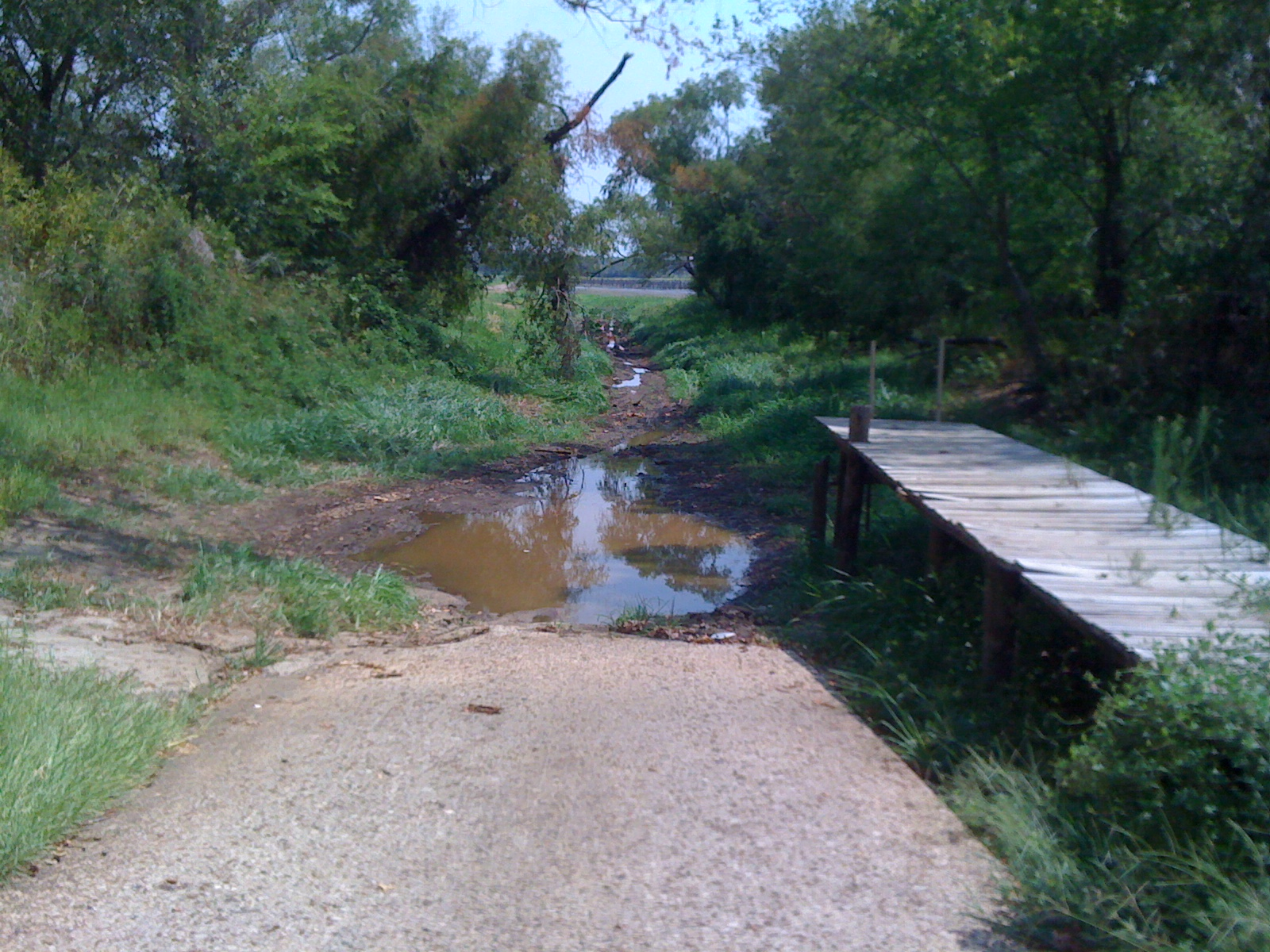
- A public boat launch at Lake Palestine left dry due to drought (Summer 2011).

- Location within Texas Location within the United States
- Location: Texas, United States
- Coordinates: 32.184647°N 95.480289°W
- Primary inflows: Neches River
- Basin countries: United States
- Max. length: 18 mi (29 km)
- Surface area: 25,560 acres (103.4 km^{2})
- Average depth: 16 ft (4.9 m)
- Max. depth: 58 ft (18 m)
- Shore length^{1}: 135 mi (217 km)
- Surface elevation: 345 ft (105 m):
- ^{1} Shore length is not a well-defined measure.

Lake Palestine is a freshwater reservoir in northeast Texas, created for industrial, municipal, and recreational purposes.

== Description ==
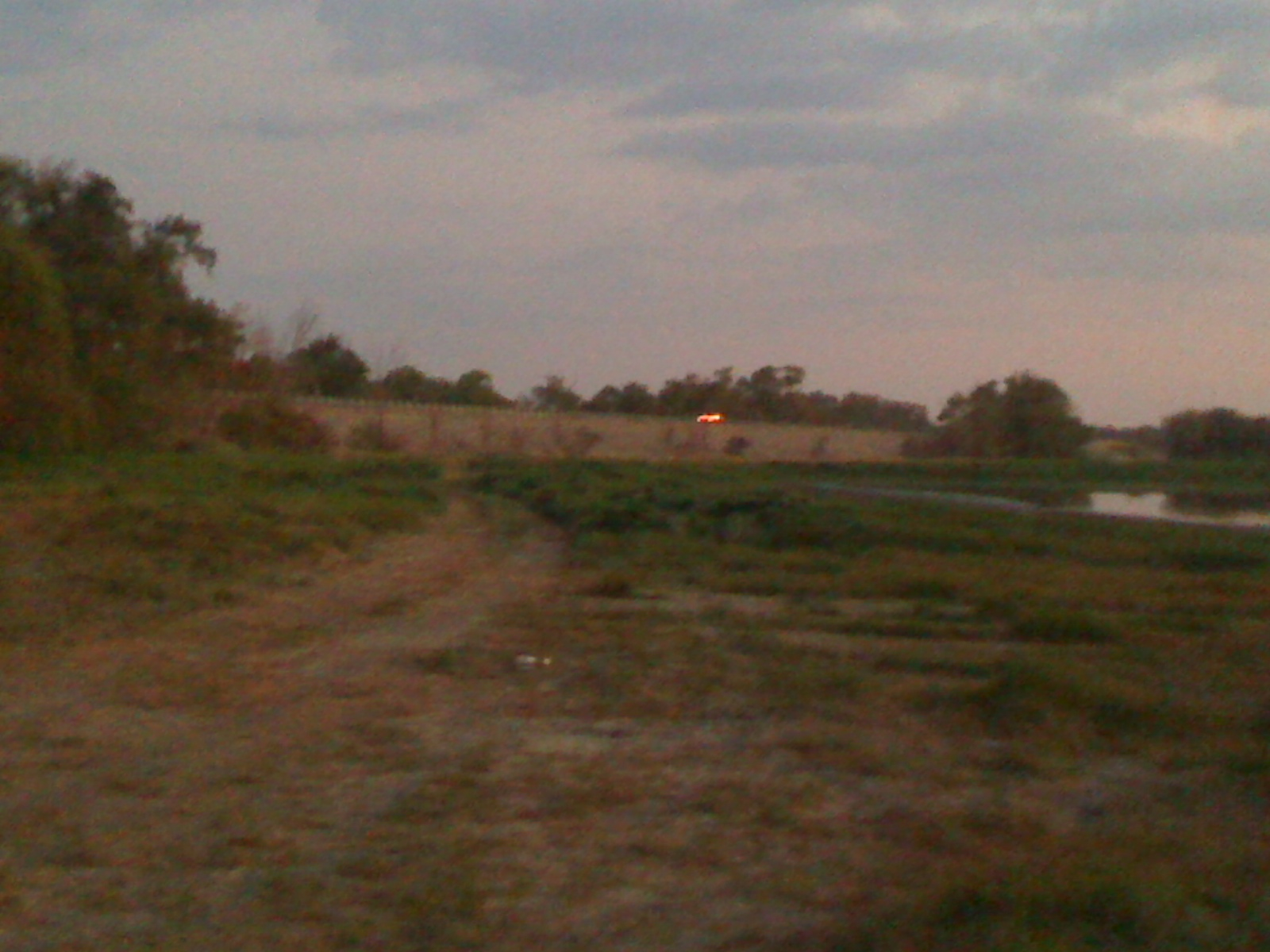
A large section of dry lake-bed, located near the lake's northwesternmost section during Summer 2011 drought conditions.

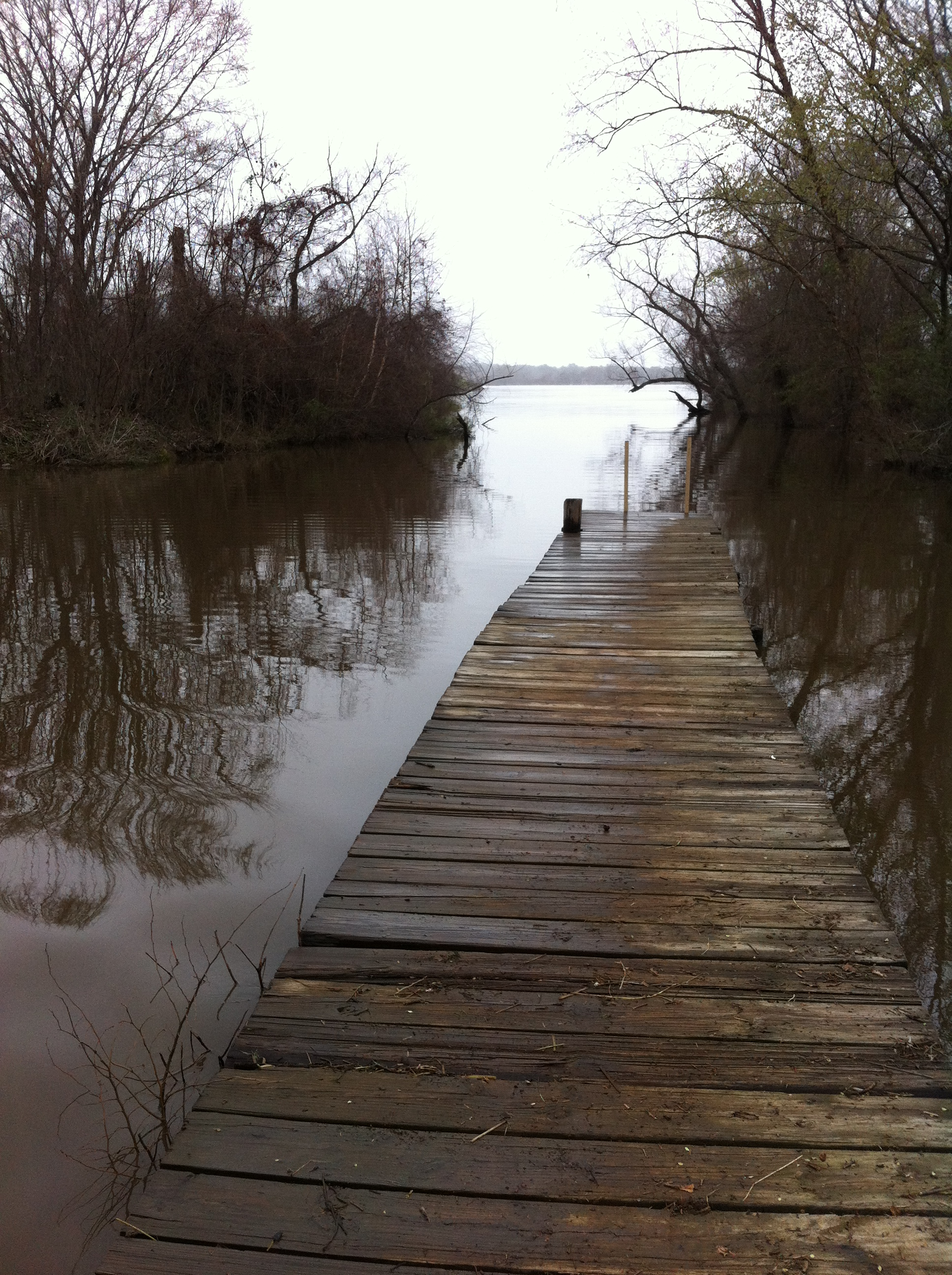
A public boat launch located near the city of Chandler. High water levels are seen here (March 2015).

The reservoir was formed by the construction of the 5720-foot-long Blackburn Crossing Dam on the Neches River. The project was started in 1960 and completed on June 13, 1962. The resulting lake is 18 miles long, stretching northwest to southeast, with 135 miles of shoreline. The widest part of the lake is 4 miles across. The lake is primarily fed by waters from the Neches River and Kickapoo Creek.

The lake is located in parts of four counties: Anderson, Cherokee, Henderson, and Smith.

According to the Texas Water Development Board 2012 Survey, the storage capacity of Lake Palestine is 367,312 acre-feet with a surface area of 23,112 acres at the conservation pool elevation of 345 feet above mean sea level. The drainage area above the dam is approximately 839 square miles.

The Tarrant Regional Water District and the City of Dallas Water Utilities partnered to build a $2.3 billion pipeline which extends 150 miles from Lake Palestine to Lake Benbrook. The project began in 2014 and is expected to be completed in phases between 2018 and 2030. Area businesses expressed alarm at the possibility that cities could pump the lake dry at any time, however officials stated that lake level declines would be 50 percent from evaporation and 50 percent pumped water, in line with management at other lakes.

The lake offers an array of freshwater fish species including bass, crappie and catfish.

== See also ==
- List of dams and reservoirs in Texas
