= Athens, Texas =

- City
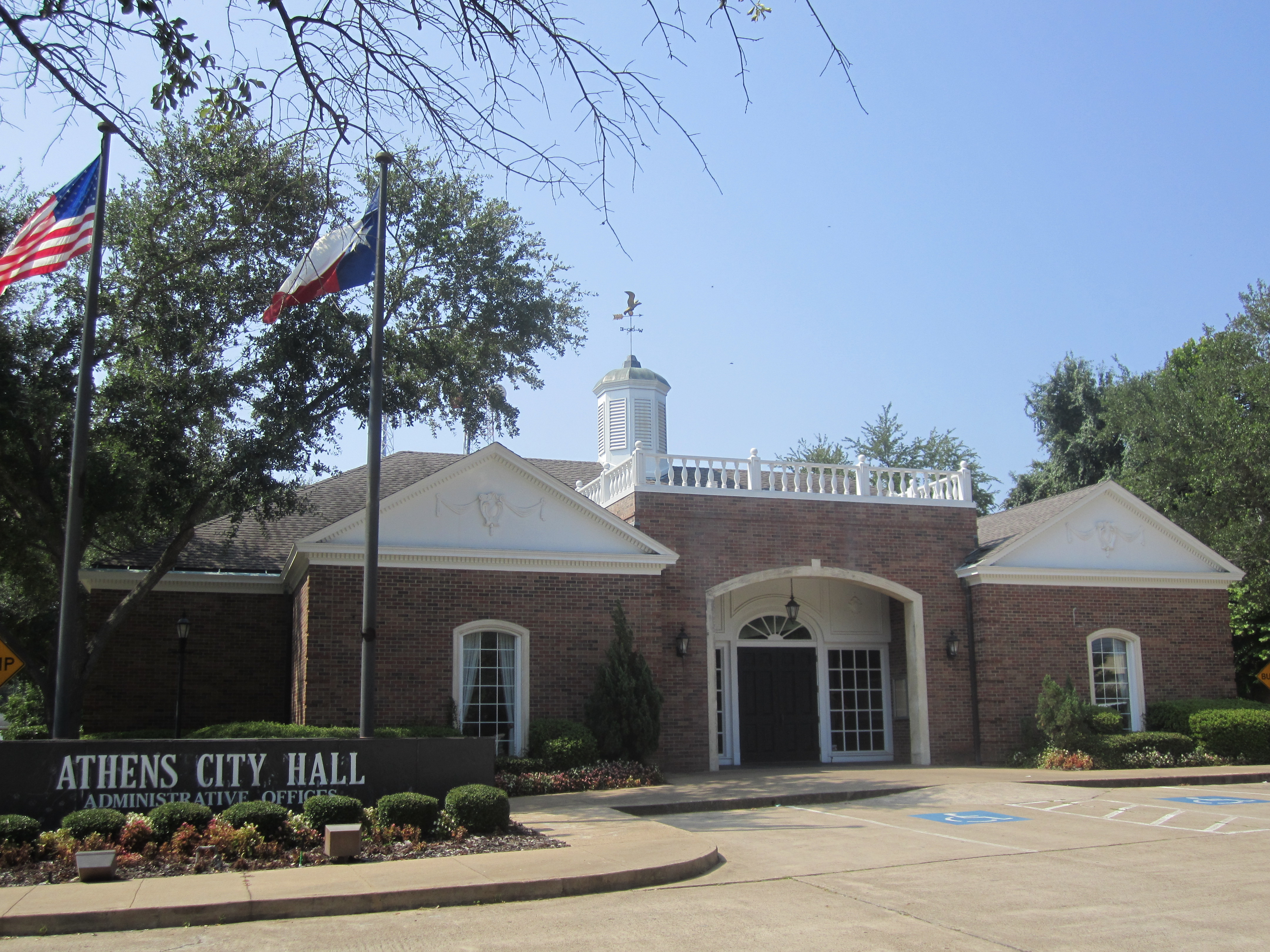
- City Hall in Athens, 508 E. Tyler St.
- Motto: "Hamburgers – Heritage – Texas"
- Interactive map of Athens, Texas
- Coordinates: 32°12′20″N 95°49′17″W
- Country: United States
- State: Texas
- County: Henderson
- Incorporated: 1856

Government
  - Type: Council-Manager

Area
  - Total: 20.20 sq mi (52.31 km^{2})
  - Land: 17.83 sq mi (46.19 km^{2})
  - Water: 2.37 sq mi (6.13 km^{2})
- Elevation: 482 ft (147 m)

Population (2020)
  - Total: 12,857
  - Density: 715.1/sq mi (276.11/km^{2})
- Time zone: UTC−6 (Central (CST))
  - Summer (DST): UTC-5 (CDT)
- ZIP codes: 75751-75752
- Area codes: 430, 903
- FIPS code: 48-04504
- GNIS feature ID: 2409747
- Website: athenstx.gov

Athens is a city in and the county seat of Henderson County, Texas, in the United States. As of the 2020 census, the city population was 12,857. The city has called itself the "Black-Eyed Pea Capital of the World." Athens was selected as one of the first "Certified Retirement Communities" in Texas. Athens was incorporated in 1856 and was named after Athens, the capital of Greece.

== Geography ==
According to the United States Census Bureau, the city has a total area of 19.2 square miles (49.7 km^{2}), of which 16.8 square miles (43.6 km^{2}) are land and 2.4 square miles (6.1 km^{2}), or 12.32%, are covered by water. Lake Athens is an 1,800-acre reservoir located in the eastern half of the city.

=== Climate ===
The climate in this area is characterized by hot, humid summers and generally mild to cool winters. According to the Köppen climate classification, Athens has a humid subtropical climate, Cfa on climate maps. The town was heavily damaged by a low-end EF2 tornado on November 4, 2022.

Climate data for Athens, Texas (1991–2020 normals, extremes 1903–present)
Month	Jan	Feb	Mar	Apr	May	Jun	Jul	Aug	Sep	Oct	Nov	Dec	Year
Record high °F (°C)	85 (29)	93 (34)	95 (35)	95 (35)	98 (37)	104 (40)	109 (43)	108 (42)	109 (43)	100 (38)	90 (32)	86 (30)	109 (43)
Mean maximum °F (°C)	75.4 (24.1)	79.2 (26.2)	83.5 (28.6)	86.5 (30.3)	91.2 (32.9)	95.6 (35.3)	99.6 (37.6)	101.0 (38.3)	97.7 (36.5)	90.8 (32.7)	81.6 (27.6)	76.9 (24.9)	102.2 (39.0)
Mean daily maximum °F (°C)	57.9 (14.4)	62.0 (16.7)	69.0 (20.6)	76.4 (24.7)	83.2 (28.4)	90.1 (32.3)	94.1 (34.5)	95.1 (35.1)	89.2 (31.8)	79.1 (26.2)	67.6 (19.8)	59.3 (15.2)	76.9 (25.0)
Daily mean °F (°C)	46.2 (7.9)	50.2 (10.1)	57.1 (13.9)	64.8 (18.2)	72.9 (22.7)	80.2 (26.8)	83.3 (28.5)	83.7 (28.7)	77.4 (25.2)	66.8 (19.3)	55.9 (13.3)	47.9 (8.8)	65.5 (18.6)
Mean daily minimum °F (°C)	34.5 (1.4)	38.5 (3.6)	45.2 (7.3)	53.1 (11.7)	62.6 (17.0)	70.3 (21.3)	72.6 (22.6)	72.3 (22.4)	65.7 (18.7)	54.6 (12.6)	44.1 (6.7)	36.5 (2.5)	54.2 (12.3)
Mean minimum °F (°C)	18.9 (−7.3)	23.6 (−4.7)	27.5 (−2.5)	37.0 (2.8)	47.0 (8.3)	61.4 (16.3)	66.1 (18.9)	64.8 (18.2)	52.4 (11.3)	37.6 (3.1)	26.3 (−3.2)	21.9 (−5.6)	16.7 (−8.5)
Record low °F (°C)	−5 (−21)	−6 (−21)	15 (−9)	25 (−4)	34 (1)	41 (5)	53 (12)	51 (11)	38 (3)	26 (−3)	10 (−12)	−2 (−19)	−6 (−21)
Average precipitation inches (mm)	3.54 (90)	3.88 (99)	4.08 (104)	3.82 (97)	4.30 (109)	4.09 (104)	2.53 (64)	2.64 (67)	2.97 (75)	5.09 (129)	3.49 (89)	4.32 (110)	44.75 (1,137)
Average snowfall inches (cm)	0.3 (0.76)	0.3 (0.76)	trace	0.0 (0.0)	0.0 (0.0)	0.0 (0.0)	0.0 (0.0)	0.0 (0.0)	0.0 (0.0)	0.0 (0.0)	0.0 (0.0)	0.2 (0.51)	0.8 (2.03)
Average precipitation days (≥ 0.01 in)	7.2	7.5	8.0	6.2	7.2	6.7	4.5	4.8	4.9	6.5	6.7	7.5	77.7
Average snowy days (≥ 0.1 in)	0.1	0.1	0.0	0.0	0.0	0.0	0.0	0.0	0.0	0.0	0.0	0.1	0.3
Source 1: NOAA (snow/snow days 1981–2010)
Source 2: National Weather Service

== Demographics ==
Historical population
Census	Pop.	Note	%±
1860	240		—
1870	545		127.1%
1880	368		−32.5%
1890	1,035		181.3%
1910	2,261		—
1920	3,176		40.5%
1930	4,342		36.7%
1940	4,765		9.7%
1950	5,194		9.0%
1960	7,086		36.4%
1970	9,582		35.2%
1980	10,197		6.4%
1990	10,967		7.6%
2000	11,297		3.0%
2010	12,710		12.5%
2020	12,857		1.2%
U.S. Decennial Census

=== 2020 census ===
As of the 2020 census, 12,857 people and 2,733 families resided in the city. The median age was 37.1 years; 23.4% of residents were under 18 and 19.4% were 65 or older. For every 100 females, there were 91.8 males, and for every 100 females 18 and over, there were 87.5 males 18 and over.

About 90.4% of residents lived in urban areas, while 9.6% lived in rural areas.

Of the 4,794 households in Athens, 31.0% had children under 18 living in them, 38.4% were married-couple households, 19.0% were households with a male householder and no spouse or partner present, and 37.5% were households with a female householder and no spouse or partner present. About 34.2% of all households were made up of individuals, and 17.1% had someone living alone who was 65 or older.

The city had 5,302 housing units, of which 9.6% were vacant. Among occupied housing units, 52.2% were owner-occupied and 47.8% were renter-occupied. The homeowner vacancy rate was 2.9% and the rental vacancy rate was 7.1%.

Racial composition as of the 2020 census
Race	Percentage
White	54.9%
Black or African American	16.3%
American Indian and Alaska Native	0.8%
Asian	1.1%
Native Hawaiian and other Pacific Islander	0.1%
Some other race	15.6%
Two or more races	11.3%
Hispanics or Latinos (of any race)	29.8%

=== 2010 census ===
As of the 2010 census, 12,710 people, 4,110 households, and 2,807 families were residing in the city. The population density was 772.8 inhabitants per square mile (298.4/km^{2}). The 4,549 housing units had an average density of 311.2 per square mile (120.2/km^{2}). The racial makeup of the city was 72.14% White, 19.23% African American, 0.31% Native American, 0.64% Asian, 0.06% Pacific Islander, 6.17% from other races, and 1.45% from two or more races. Hispanics or Latinos of any race were 17.37% of the population.

Of the 4,110 households, 32.7% had children under 18 living with them, 49.1% were married couples living together, 15.4% had a female householder with no husband present, and 31.7% were not families. Of 4,110 households, 131 were unmarried partner households; 106 were heterosexual, 14 were same-sex male, and 11 were same-sex female households. About 28.6% of all households were made up of individuals, and 14.6% had someone living alone who was 65 or older. The average household size was 2.55, and the average family size was 3.13.

In the city, the age distribution was 26.4% under 18, 11.6% from 18 to 24, 25.0% from 25 to 44, 19.1% from 45 to 64, and 17.9% who were 65 or older. The median age was 35 years. For every 100 females, there were 90.2 males. For every 100 females 18 and over, there were 83.3 males.

The median income in the city for a household was $29,372 and for a family was $35,359. Males had a median income of $27,388 versus $19,375 for females. The per capita income for the city was $16,561. About 14.7% of families and 18.3% of the population were below the poverty line, including 21.5% of those under 18 and 16.7% of those 65 or over.

== Government ==
=== Local government ===
According to the city's most recent Comprehensive Annual Financial Report, the city's various funds had $8.0 million in revenues, $8.6 million in expenditures, and $4.2 million in total assets, $0.7 million in total liabilities, and $0.7 million in cash and investments.

=== State and federal representation ===
The Texas Department of Criminal Justice (TDCJ) operates the Athens District Parole Office in Athens.

The United States Postal Service operates the Athens Post Office.

== Education ==
The city of Athens is served by the Athens Independent School District and is home to the Athens High School Hornets. A very small portion in the eastern outskirts of Athens is within the Brownsboro Independent School District.

The main campus of Trinity Valley Community College is located in Athens.

== Arts and culture ==
The Texas Freshwater Fisheries Center, operated by the Texas Parks and Wildlife Department, is located east of the city on Lake Athens.

The East Texas Arboretum and Botanical Society is located in the northwest part of the city.

In addition to Lake Athens, Cedar Creek Reservoir is located northwest of the city, and is a popular vacation destination, especially for Dallas-Fort Worth Metroplex residents, some of whom own a lake home on or nearby. Lake Palestine is located to its east.

== Notable people ==
- Fred Agnich, Texas businessman, rancher, state legislator
- Fletcher Davis, one of a number of Americans who lay claim to inventing the modern hamburger
- Pete Donohue, Major League Baseball pitcher
- Jakeem Grant, NFL wide receiver for the Cleveland Browns
- William R. Hawn, businessman, sportsman
- William Wayne Justice, former United States District Court judge
- Fred LaRue, former aide to President Richard Nixon.
- Terrence McGee, former NFL cornerback for Buffalo Bills
- Clint Murchison, Jr., businessman and founder of the Dallas Cowboys football team
- Sid W. Richardson, native of Athens, Texas, oilman, cattleman, philanthropist
- Barron Tanner, former NFL defensive lineman
