= Texas State Highway 198 =

State highway in Texas

State Highway 198
- SH 198, highlighted in red

Route information
- Maintained by TxDOT
- Length: 37.673 mi (60.629 km)
- Existed: by 1934–present

Major junctions
- South end: SH 31 in Malakoff
- US 175 in Mabank
- North end: SH 64 in Canton

Location
- Country: United States
- State: Texas
- Counties: Henderson, Kaufman, Van Sandt

Highway system
- Highways in Texas; Interstate; US; State; Former; Toll; Loops; Spurs; FM/RM; Park; Rec
← SH 197	→ SH 199

State Highway 198 (SH 198) is a 37.673-mile (60.629 km) state highway in Henderson, Kaufman, Van Zandt counties in Texas that runs between Malakoff and Canton. SH 198 was designated in 1933, and its current routing was established in 1983.

== History ==
SH 198 was originally designated on August 15, 1933, from Canton to Mabank. On January 21, 1936, it was extended to Corsicana. On October 6, 1943, this extension was canceled. On May 19, 1983, it was extended south to Malakoff, replacing part of FM 90.

== Major intersections ==
County	Location	mi	km	Destinations	Notes
Henderson	Malakoff	0.000	0.000	SH 31 (Royall Boulevard) / FM 3441 south – Corsicana, Athens	Southern terminus
Henderson	Malakoff			FM 3062 west	
Henderson	Caney City			FM 1214 west	
Henderson	Log Cabin			RM 3054 east – Log Cabin	
Henderson	Payne Springs			FM 316 north – Eustace	
Henderson	Gun Barrel City			SH 334 (Main Street) – Seven Points	
Kaufman	Mabank			Bus. US 175 (Mason Street)	
Kaufman	Mabank			US 175 – Kaufman, Athens	
Kaufman	Mabank			FM 90 north – Prairieville	
Van Zandt				FM 3080 east to FM 316	
Van Zandt				FM 47 north – Wills Point	
Van Zandt				FM 316 south – Eustace	
Van Zandt				FM 1651 – Whitton, Tundra	
Van Zandt				FM 3227 west – Prairieville	
Van Zandt	Canton			SH 243 (Veterans Memorial Parkway) – Kaufman, Tyler	
Van Zandt	Canton	37.673	60.629	SH 64 (Dallas Street) – Wills Point, Tyler	Northern terminus
1.000 mi = 1.609 km; 1.000 km = 0.621 mi

== See also ==
- List of state highways in Texas
- List of highways numbered 198
