= Texas State Highway 334 =

State highway in Texas

State Highway 334
- SH 334, highlighted in red

Route information
- Maintained by TxDOT
- Length: 10.119 mi (16.285 km)
- Existed: 1989–present

Major junctions
- West end: SH 274 in Seven Points
- East end: US 175 in Gun Barrel City

Location
- Country: United States
- State: Texas

Highway system
- Highways in Texas; Interstate; US; State; Former; Toll; Loops; Spurs; FM/RM; Park; Rec
← SH 333	→ SH 335

State Highway 334 (SH 334) is a 10.119-mile (16.285 km) state highway in the U.S. state of Texas. The highway begins at a junction with State Highway 274 (SH 274) in Seven Points and heads east to a junction with U.S. Highway 175 (US 175) in Gun Barrel City.

== History ==
SH 334 was originally designated on September 25, 1939, as a route from Freeport southward to Bryan Beach. This route was cancelled on August 27, 1959, along with SH 333, due to the completion of FM 1495. SH 334 was redesignated in 1989 as a renumbering of a portion of FM 85 to serve as a route between Seven Points and Gun Barrel City.

== Route description ==
SH 334 begins at a junction with SH 274 in Seven Points. It heads east from this junction across the Cedar Creek Reservoir to an intersection with SH 198 in Gun Barrel City. SH 334 reaches its eastern terminus at US 175 in Gun Barrel City.

== Junction list ==
The entire route is in Henderson County.

Location	mi	km	Destinations	Notes
Seven Points	0.0	0.0	SH 274 (Seven Points Boulevard) / FM 85 west (Cedar Creek Parkway)	
Gun Barrel City	6.0	9.7	SH 198 (Gun Barrel Lane) – Mabank, Payne Springs	
Gun Barrel City	10.1	16.3	US 175 – Mabank, Eustace, Athens	Interchange
1.000 mi = 1.609 km; 1.000 km = 0.621 mi
