= Enchanted Oaks, Texas =

- Town
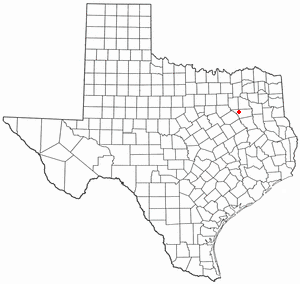
- Location of Enchanted Oaks, Texas

- Coordinates: 32°16′00″N 96°06′32″W
- Country: United States
- State: Texas
- County: Henderson

Area
  - Total: 0.39 sq mi (1.02 km^{2})
  - Land: 0.39 sq mi (1.02 km^{2})
  - Water: 0 sq mi (0.00 km^{2})
- Elevation: 345 ft (105 m)

Population (2020)
  - Total: 347
  - Density: 881/sq mi (340/km^{2})
- Time zone: UTC-6 (Central (CST))
  - Summer (DST): UTC-5 (CDT)
- ZIP code: 75147 (Mabank)
- Area codes: 903, 430
- FIPS code: 48-24228
- GNIS feature ID: 2412487
- Website: www.enchantedoaks.org

Enchanted Oaks is a town in Henderson County, Texas, United States. The population was 347 at the 2020 census, down from 326 at the 2010 census.

== Geography ==
Enchanted Oaks is located in northwestern Henderson County on the east shore of Cedar Creek Reservoir. It is bordered to the north by the town of Payne Springs. It is 7 miles (11 km) south of Mabank and 20 miles (32 km) northwest of Athens, the Henderson county seat.

According to the United States Census Bureau, the town has a total area of 0.39 square miles (1.0 km^{2}), all land.

== Demographics ==
Historical population
Census	Pop.	Note	%±
1980	212		—
1990	290		36.8%
2000	357		23.1%
2010	326		−8.7%
2020	347		6.4%
U.S. Decennial Census; 2020 Census

As of the census of 2000, there were 357 people, 166 households, and 122 families residing in the town. The population density was 917.8 inhabitants per square mile (354.4/km^{2}). There were 237 housing units at an average density of 609.3 units per square mile (235.3 units/km^{2}). The racial makeup of the town was 94.68% White, 0.56% African American, 0.28% Native American, and 4.48% from two or more races. Hispanic or Latino of any race were 3.08% of the population.

There were 166 households, out of which 13.9% had children under the age of 18 living with them, 68.1% were married couples living together, 4.2% had a female householder with no husband present, and 26.5% were non-families. 25.9% of all households were made up of individuals, and 18.1% had someone living alone who was 65 years of age or older. The average household size was 2.15 and the average family size was 2.52.

In the town, the population was spread out, with 15.7% under the age of 18, 3.1% from 18 to 24, 15.4% from 25 to 44, 32.8% from 45 to 64, and 33.1% who were 65 years of age or older. The median age was 56 years. For every 100 females, there were 95.1 males. For every 100 females age 18 and over, there were 92.9 males.

The median income for a household in the town was $64,097, and the median income for a family was $76,634. Males had a median income of $51,316 versus $34,545 for females. The per capita income for the town was $32,563. None of the families and 7.4% of the population were living below the poverty line, including no under eighteens and 5.3% of those over 64.

== Education ==
Most of the town is part of the Eustace Independent School District. A small portion is in the Mabank Independent School District.
