= U.S. Route 175 =

U.S. Highway in the state of Texas

U.S. Highway 175
- US 175 highlighted in red

Route information
- Auxiliary route of US 75
- Maintained by TxDOT
- Length: 111.0 mi (178.6 km)
- Existed: 1932–present

Major junctions
- West end: I-45 in Dallas
- SH 310 in Dallas; I-20 / I-635 in Balch Springs; SH 243 in Kaufman; SH 34 in Kaufman; SH 274 in Kemp; SH 198 in Mabank; SH 31 in Athens; SH 19 in Athens; SH 155 in Frankston
- East end: US 69 in Jacksonville

Location
- Country: United States
- State: Texas
- Counties: Dallas, Kaufman, Henderson, Anderson, Cherokee

Highway system
- United States Numbered Highway System; List; Special; Divided; Highways in Texas; Interstate; US; State; Former; Toll; Loops; Spurs; FM/RM; Park; Rec
← SH 174	→ SH 175

U.S. Highway 175 (US 175) is a 111.0-mile (178.6 km) east-west United States Numbered Highway located completely within the state of Texas. It comes very close to meeting its parent route, US 75, but decommissioning and rerouting in Downtown Dallas leaves it short a couple of miles. Before the decommissioning of US 75 south of downtown Dallas in favor of Interstate 45 (I-45), US 175 met US 75. US 175's western terminus is in Dallas at I-45. The highway's eastern terminus is in Jacksonville at an intersection with US 69.

Much of the US 175 corridor (from I-20 in Balch Springs to US 69 in Jacksonville) is part of TxDOT's network of evacuation routes in the event of a hurricane. TxDOT also considers the highway an alternative to using I-20 to travel to and from Dallas-Fort Worth, and feels the corridor is an important connection for students to get to Stephen F. Austin State University in Nacogdoches, as well. Besides its hurricane evacuation route status, US 175 is considered part of the National Highway System, the Texas Trunk System (later revised to just the portion between Mabank and Jacksonville), and is also included in the state's highway freight network.

Of all the three-digit U.S. Highways located within Texas, US 175 is the shortest.

== Route description ==
=== Dallas County ===
US 175 begins south of downtown Dallas at an interchange with Interstate 45. At this point, US 175 is four lanes in width—two eastbound and two westbound. The highway is a freeway-style structure that is, at first, elevated over the nearby neighborhoods of Ideal and Bonton, in South Dallas. US 175 also carries the name of the C.F. Hawn Freeway here, named after Charles Fred Hawn, a former lieutenant commander in the U.S. Navy from Athens.

After passing over State Highway 310 (the S.M. Wright Freeway), a third lane is added in each direction of the freeway. After passing Bexar Street and Municipal Drive, the freeway goes into a lowland area that includes a crossing of White Rock Creek, then the freeway turns southeastward at the Second Avenue/Bruton Road exit. US 175 comes back up from the lowland area at the Lake June Road exit.

US 175 passes through the Pleasant Grove area of Dallas past an interchange with Loop 12 (Buckner Blvd.), and then Interstate 20 a few miles later. The interchange with I-20 is a “stack” style, and is located just south of I-20’s interchange with Interstate 635 which US 175 also connects into; this is also a brief point where US 175 passes out of Dallas and into Balch Springs, then right back into Dallas. The freeway continues, but narrows to four lanes (two in each direction) at the I-20 interchange.

After the Woody Road exit, US 175 leaves Dallas and enters the city of Seagoville. On the east side of Seagoville, US 175 leaves Dallas County.

=== Kaufman County ===
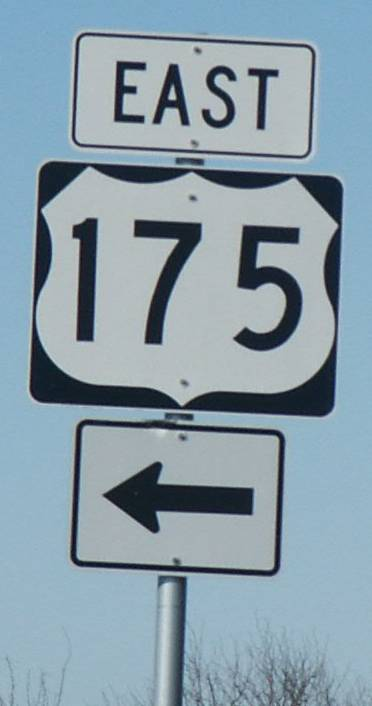
Marker for US 175 east of Kaufman

As US 175 comes into Kaufman County, the surroundings become more rural. The freeway descends into a river valley and wetlands area, and then crosses the East Fork of the Trinity River. This marks the city limit boundary between Seagoville and Crandall.

After rising out of the valley area, the highway goes through Crandall by intersecting Farm to Market Road 741 (which connects Crandall to Forney), then passing the center of town, and another exit, with Farm to Market Road 148 (connecting Crandall to Terrell). A few miles later, a rural interchange for County Road 4104-Bud Stoy Road marks the city limit border of Crandall and Kaufman. The freeway continues into Kaufman past a wide right curve at the State Highway 243 interchange, then passes by a brief urban section at the Business State Highway 34 (Washington Street) exit. After another mile, an exit for State Highway 34 comes along.

After that exit, US 175 loses its freeway characteristics but continues as a four-lane divided highway. The highway proceeds for several miles before approaching Kemp. Here a bypass takes US 175 around the north and east of town, while the first of four business routes of US 175 goes through Kemp along US 175's previous routing in the area. After the bypass makes its way past a freeway-style exit at State Highway 274 (which also forms the east end of Business US 175), US 175 leaves the main part of Kemp.

The highway continues as a divided four-lane road past two multi-bridge spans of Cedar Creek Reservoir. Between the two spans is the city limit border between Kemp and Mabank. After the second span of the lake, US 175 begins bypassing the main part of Mabank while another US 175 business route serves a through-town portion along a previous routing of the highway. One part of US 175 along its bypass is freeway-style, at an interchange with State Highway 198. The highway leaves Kaufman County just before completing its bypass of Mabank.

=== Henderson County ===
US 175 enters Henderson County as it approaches an at-grade intersection with the east end of Business US 175. The highway continues being divided with four lanes. A rural at-grade intersection with a county road marks the city limit border between Mabank and Gun Barrel City, then US 175 approaches a freeway-style interchange with State Highway 334. This state highway connects to the main portion of Gun Barrel City to the west, and is the last major road connecting US 175 to Cedar Creek Reservoir.

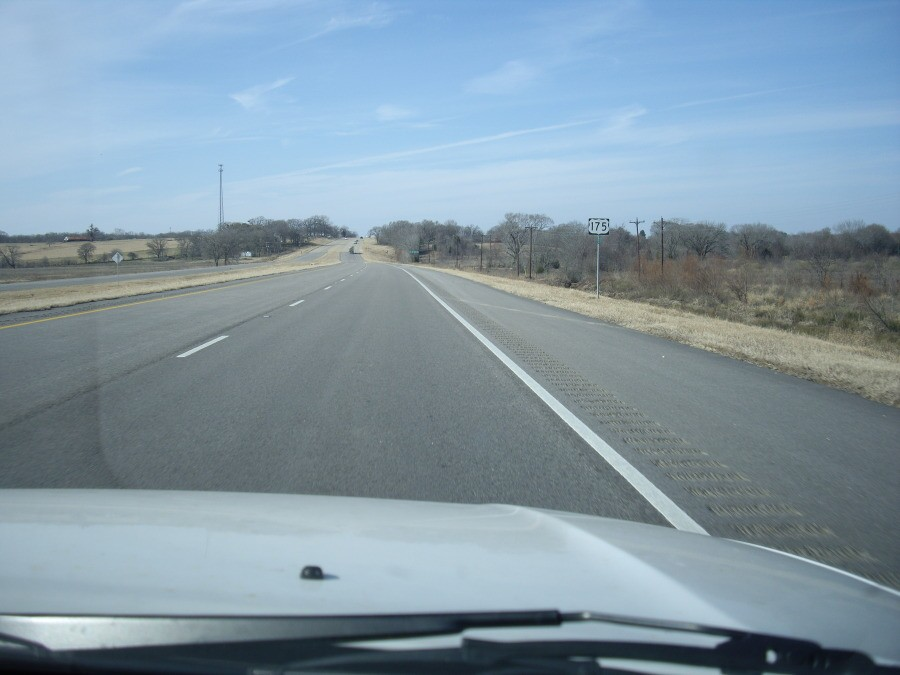
Westbound lane of US 175 near Eustace (January 2010)

After the interchange, US 175 leaves the city limits of Gun Barrel City, and within a mile, it enters the city limits of Eustace. Soon afterward, the highway narrows to an undivided four-lane road with a left-turn lane. US 175 approaches its first signal light at the intersection of Farm to Market Road 316, which comes into Eustace from the south; the intersection is the beginning of a brief overlap of the two roads near the center of town. FM 316's overlap concludes after four short blocks by turning left at another signal-lighted intersection to go north out of Eustace. US 175 continues out of Eustace and goes on another mile or so before becoming divided once again with four lanes. Once out of Eustace, US 175's speed limit goes up to 75 mph (120 km/h), the highest maximum speed of any segment of the highway.

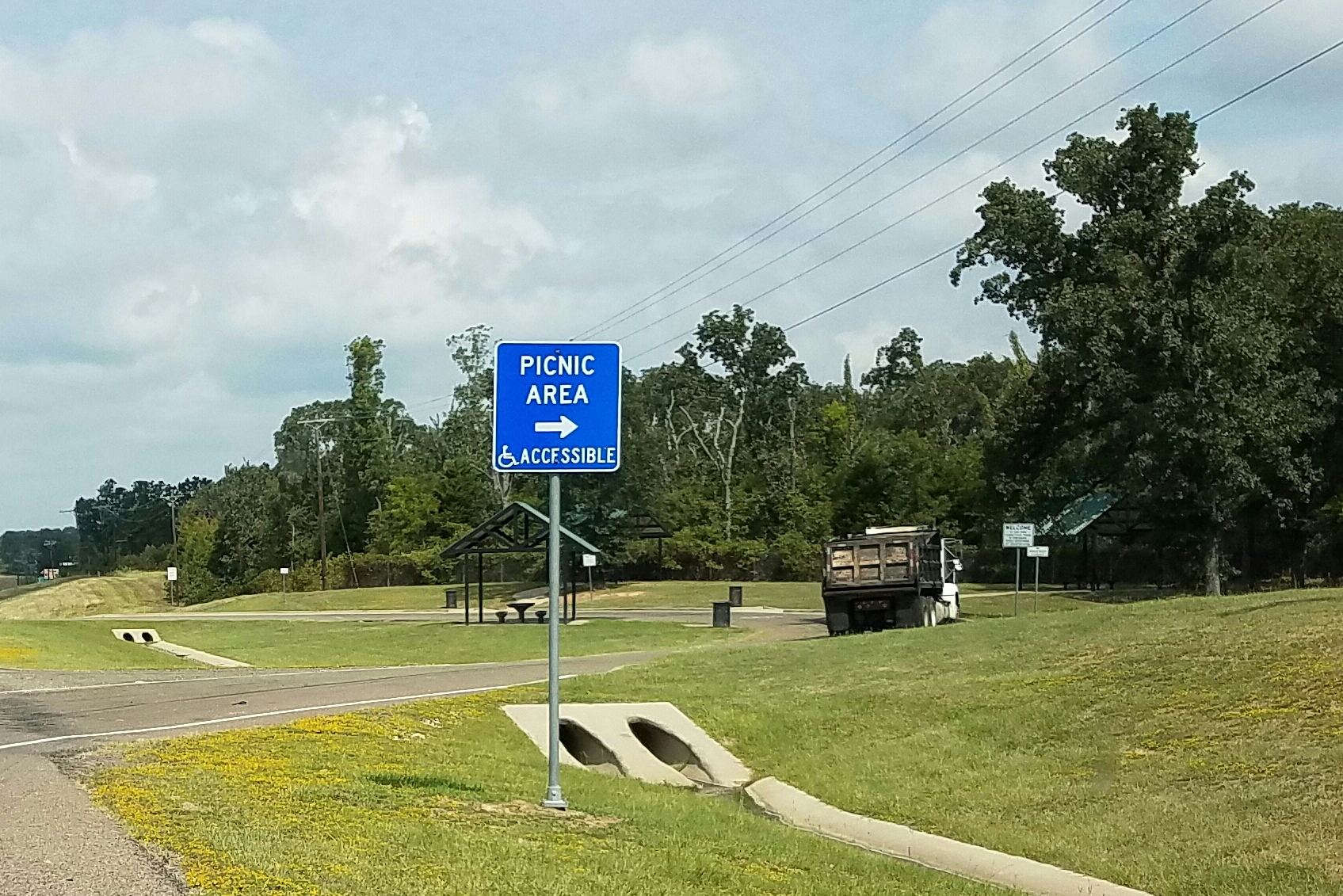
Just northwest of Athens, a picnic area west of the RM 2329 intersection

US 175 continues southeast for several more miles, then it passes a state-maintained roadside picnic area, the only one on the whole highway. An intersection with Ranch to Market Road 2329 comes up right afterward, then within a mile, US 175 enters the city limits of Athens. A few more miles later, the divided roadway narrows again, to an undivided four-lane road with a left-turn lane. After another mile, US 175 intersects Loop 7; it begins bypassing Athens by turning left and overlapping the loop (as well as State Highway 31, which also bypasses Athens by way of the loop). At this same intersection, the third of US 175's four business routes goes into Athens, along a previous routing of US 175. The portion of the route carrying US 175, SH 31, and Loop 7 is a four-lane highway with a left turn lane. On the north side of Athens, the highway intersects State Highway 19 with a grade-separated exit; the south-bound SH 19 bypasses Athens by merging with US 175, SH 31, and Loop 7 here while north-bound SH 19 turns left to go away from Athens, and a business route of SH 19 begins here to go south into the main part of town.

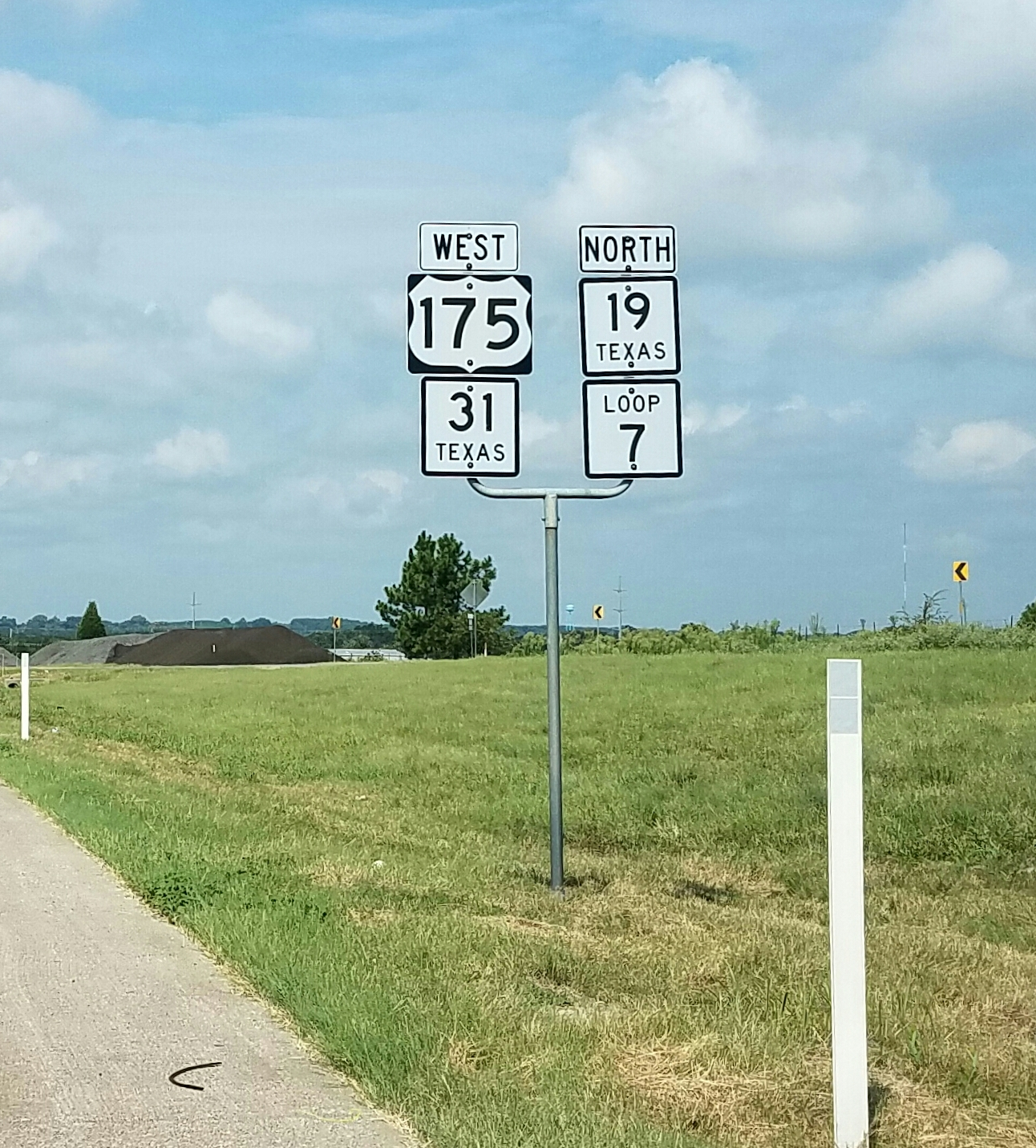
Sign assembly in Athens illustrating the four concurrent routes sharing this part of the city's loop. This is the most routes that overlap with US 175 on any part of the highway.

The four routes continue around Athens eastward past an at-grade intersection with Farm to Market Road 1616. SH 31 turns away from the four-route overlap at the next exit; it leaves by turning left (northeast) toward Tyler, while a business route of SH 31 turns right at the exit to go into Athens. US 175, SH 19, and Loop 7 continue their overlap around to the east edge of Athens, past a grade-separated exit of Farm to Market Road 2495. This road connects to Lake Athens and the Texas Freshwater Fisheries Center. A short distance later, US 175 turns away from SH 19 and Loop 7 at the next exit; US 175 goes left to return to its southeastward path, and the east end of Business US 175 is also found at this exit by turning right from the exit intersection.

The roadway US 175 takes after leaving the Loop and the southeast side of Athens is once again a divided four-lane. After a few miles, US 175 intersects Farm to Market Road 804 in the community of Baxter. The divided four-lane arrangement continues past rural, rolling terrain, then after several miles is an intersection with Loop 60 in the community of Larue. The signage at the at-grade turn to the left also points to an eventual intersection with Farm to Market Road 607. A short distance later is an intersection with Ranch to Market Road 2588, on the south side of Larue. A short distance further is another intersection with Loop 60.

Leaving the vicinity of Larue, and after a few miles, the LaPoynor consolidated school campus can be found on the left side of the highway; it includes a school zone with a speed limit of 35 mph (55 km/h). For less than a mile along the north side of the highway, a service road can be found along the frontage of the school, which provides a safe connection and access for faculty and students. The service road continues a short distance further west past the school campus until an intersection with a local county road. About a mile past the school campus, at a county road crossing, is the city limits for the town of Poynor. Just before reaching the center of town, a left turn accesses the west end of Business US 175-H, which connects US 175 with Poynor's main crossroad, Farm to Market Road 315. US 175 continues on as a bypass around the center of Poynor, crossing a bridge that spans but does not connect to FM 315. After another half mile, US 175 reaches the east end of Business US 175-H.

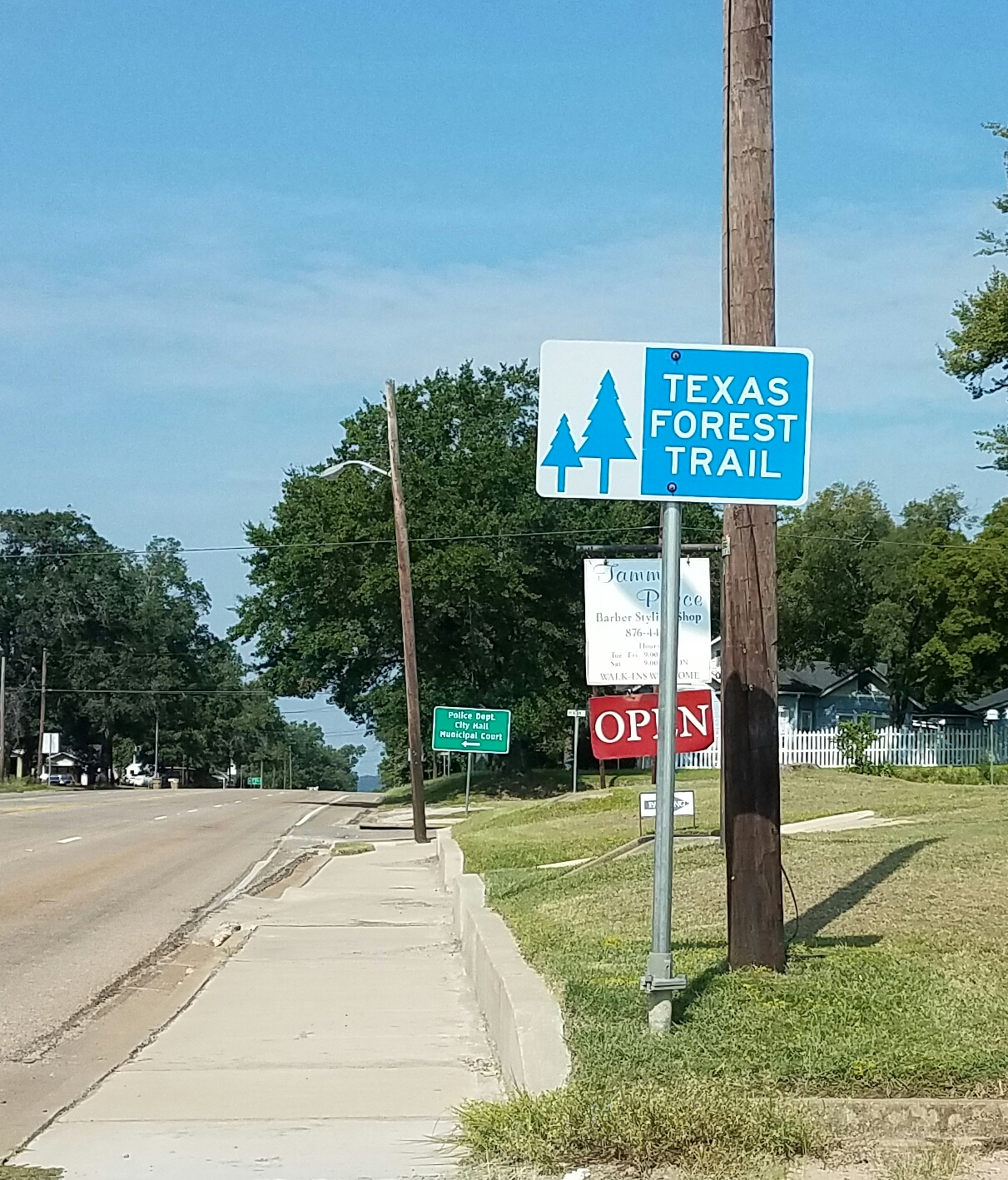
Texas Forest Trail sign along US 175 in Frankston

At this point, US 175 becomes part of the Texas Forest Trail, one of several posted regional byways across the state. The Trail wanders around to several protected forest areas and scenic spots around eastern Texas. About a mile further, US 175 reaches the city limit border on the east side of Poynor, then it leaves Henderson County around a mile after that.

=== Anderson County ===
US 175 enters Anderson County by continuing its divided four-lane arrangement. After a few miles, the four lanes narrow, excluding the dividing median, but including a left-turn lane. Not long afterward, US 175 crosses the city limit line of Frankston. US 175 also goes by the name of Pine Street in Frankston. A few blocks after entering the town, the business district can be seen, with Frankston's downtown area just south of US 175. It is here where the highway intersects State Highway 155, the other major highway that serves the vicinity of Frankston. There is a full signal light at the intersection as well as a left-turn lane on each approach. This intersection marks the end of US 175's segment of the Texas Forest Trail; from here, it turns north to follow SH 155. After SH 155, and over a hill, US 175 leaves the urban portion of Frankston and, for the first time along the road, the four-lane section narrows to two lanes.

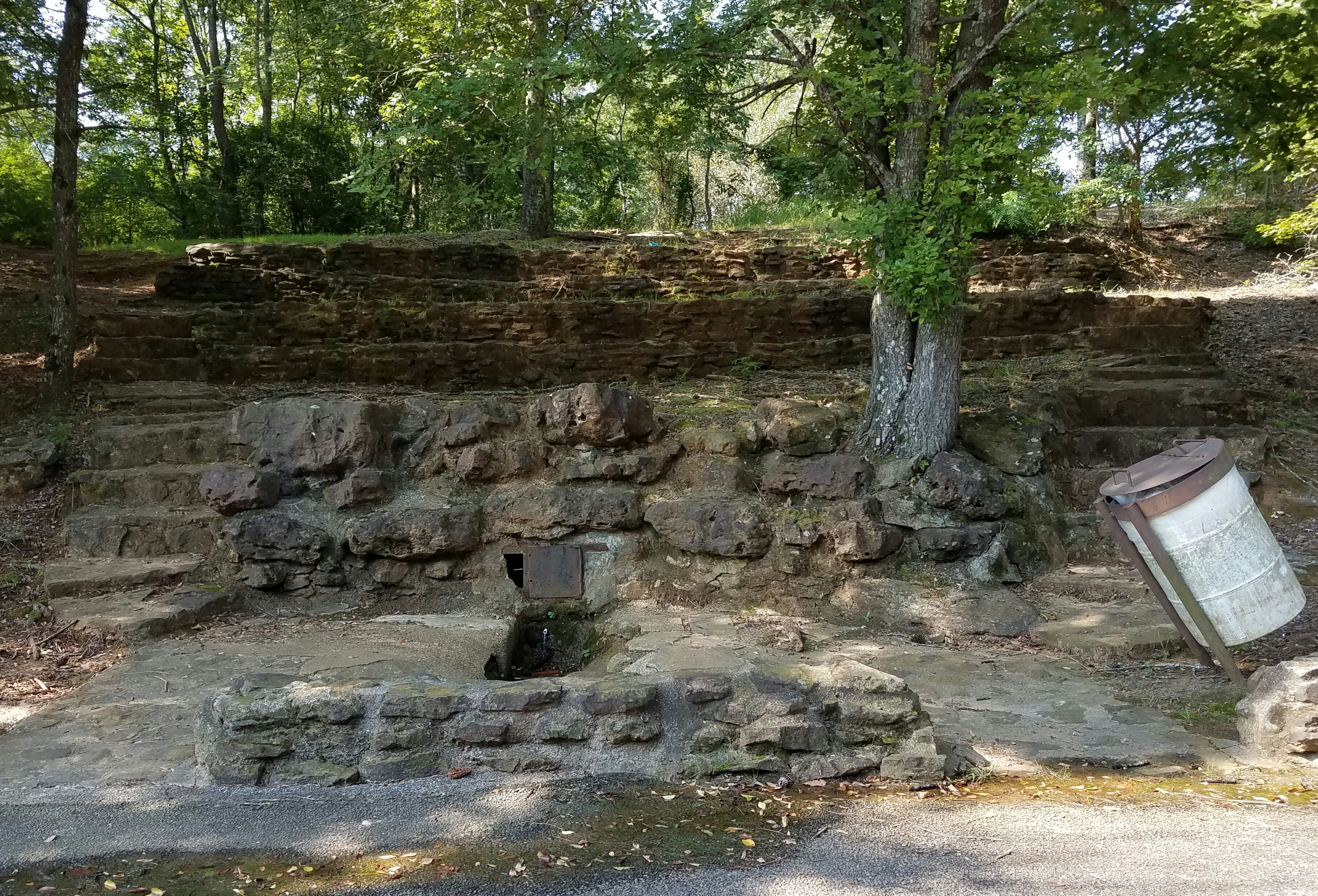
This roadside spring just west of the Neches River has been a favorite stop for locals for many years.

The east city limits of Frankston is crossed in less than two more miles. An assortment of hills, climbing lanes, and gentle curves are encountered on the highway. At the top of a hill east of Frankston is an intersection with Farm to Market Road 1892; this road connects to the south end of Lake Palestine near its dam. After a gradual downward slope and at the bottom of a hill, the bridge crossing of the Neches River is reached; this is the point where US 175 leaves Anderson County.

=== Cherokee County ===
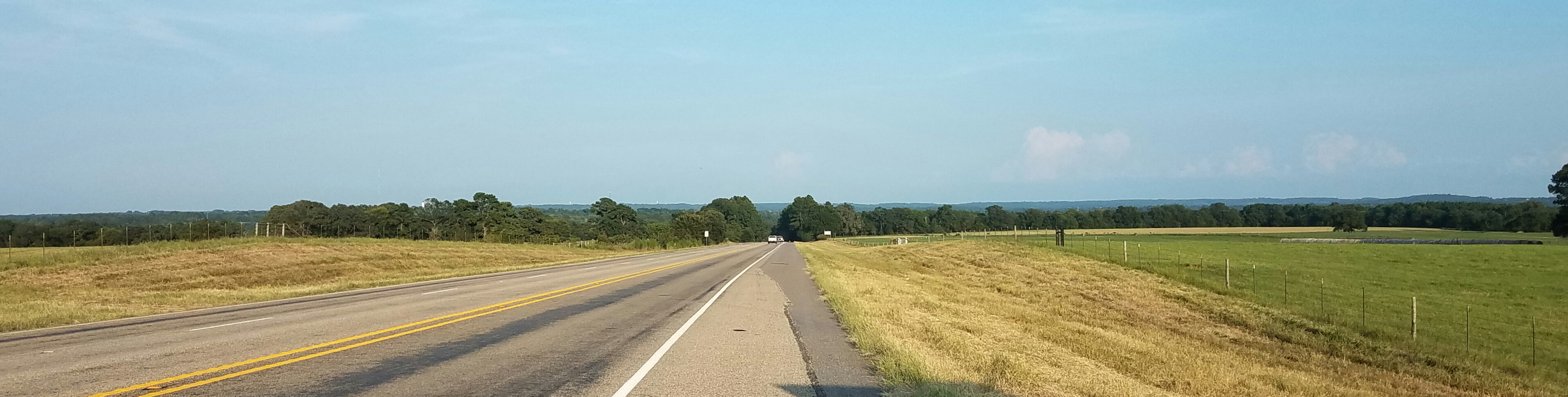
Looking east along the highway just east of the intersection with FM 1892. Anderson County is in the foreground, the Neches River bottom is along the first set of trees, and Cherokee County is in the background.

After the bridge span over the Neches River and into Cherokee County, and a short distance later, US 175 reaches the west city limit border of Cuney. There is not much of a town center besides a city hall and post office, mainly scattered stores, modest homes, and a church along the way. Just after crossing the east city limit border of Cuney, US 175 comes to an intersection with Farm to Market Road 855.

A left curve is ahead, then US 175 enters the community of Reese. There are two cemeteries, one on each side of the highway, then mostly homes and acreages in the community. Upon leaving Reese, there is a curve in the road to the right, then a slight ascent up a long hillside, with a climbing lane eastbound. At the top of the hill and around a wide right curve, US 175 approaches Cove Springs. The community is similar to Reese with mostly homes and acreages alongside the highway.

As US 175 departs Cove Springs, it descends a long hillside with a climbing lane on the westbound side. A county road intersection at the top of the next hill leads south into the community of Church Hill. Then US 175 descends down a slightly longer hill, and a slight right curve to an intersection with County Road 3405, which leads north. The site of the Killough Monument can be accessed by way of this same road.

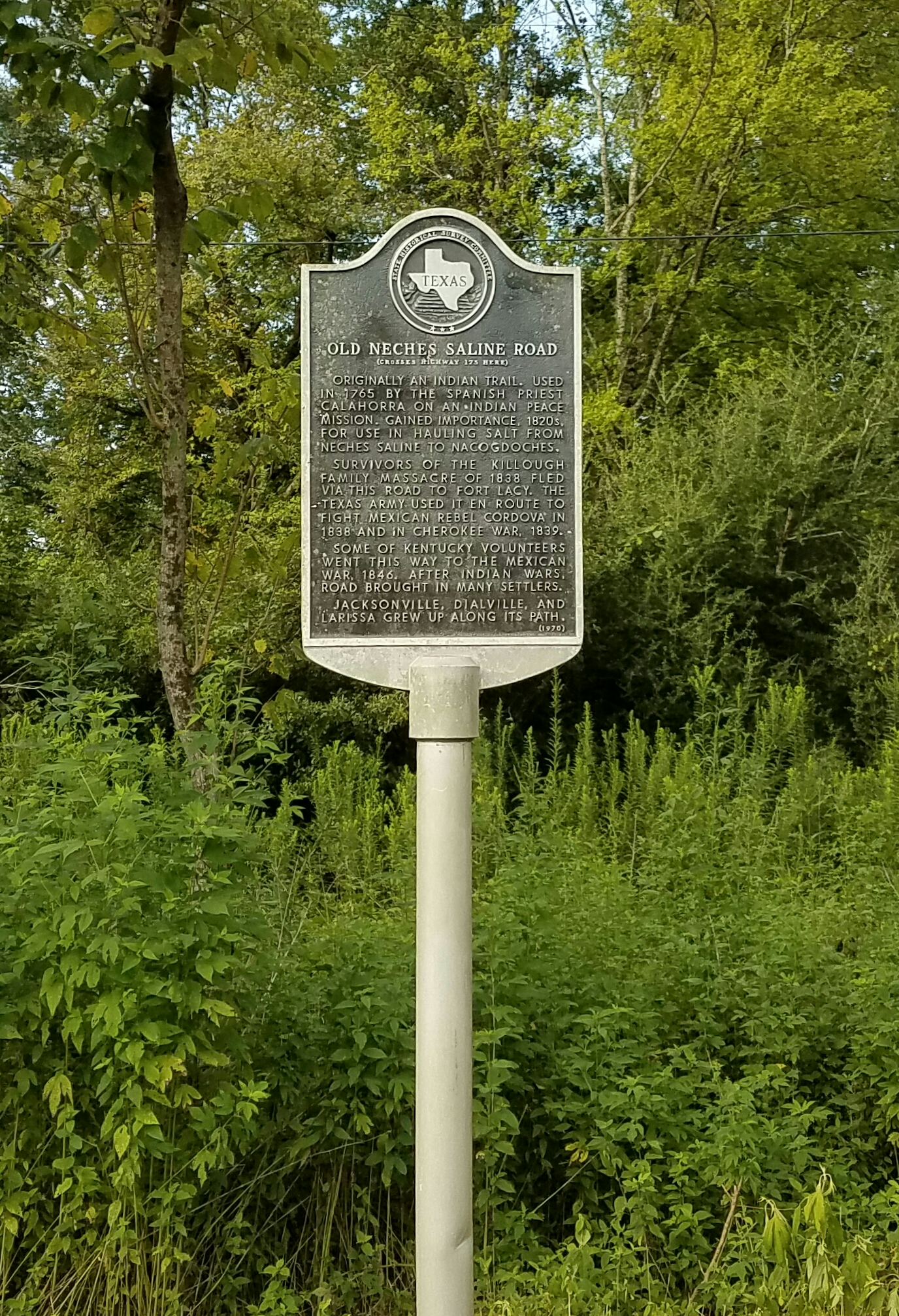
Old Neches Saline Road state Historical Marker at this spot northwest of Jacksonville

Across from this intersection is a Texas Historical Marker commemorating the past existence of the Neches Saline Road (a part of which is traversed by County Road 3405), a path once used by Native Americans and early area settlers.

After another mile, a county road turns off to the right toward the community of Lakeview. A short hill ahead features climbing lanes in both directions. After another mile or so, US 175 approaches the city limit border on the northwest side of Jacksonville. This part of US 175 in Jacksonville is also known as Frankston Street. Between the city limits and the next street intersection, Pineda Street, an elementary school is on the right, with a special lower school zone speed.

A signal light after three blocks marks an intersection with Farm to Market Road 347 (North Bolton Street). For its final three blocks, US 175 changes street names to Alexander Boulevard and widens to four lanes with a left turn lane, with wide berms beyond the sides of the street, separating it from neighborhoods to the north and south. Another signal light ahead marks an intersection with U.S. Highway 69 (North Jackson Street); this point marks US 175's eastern terminus.

== Business routes ==
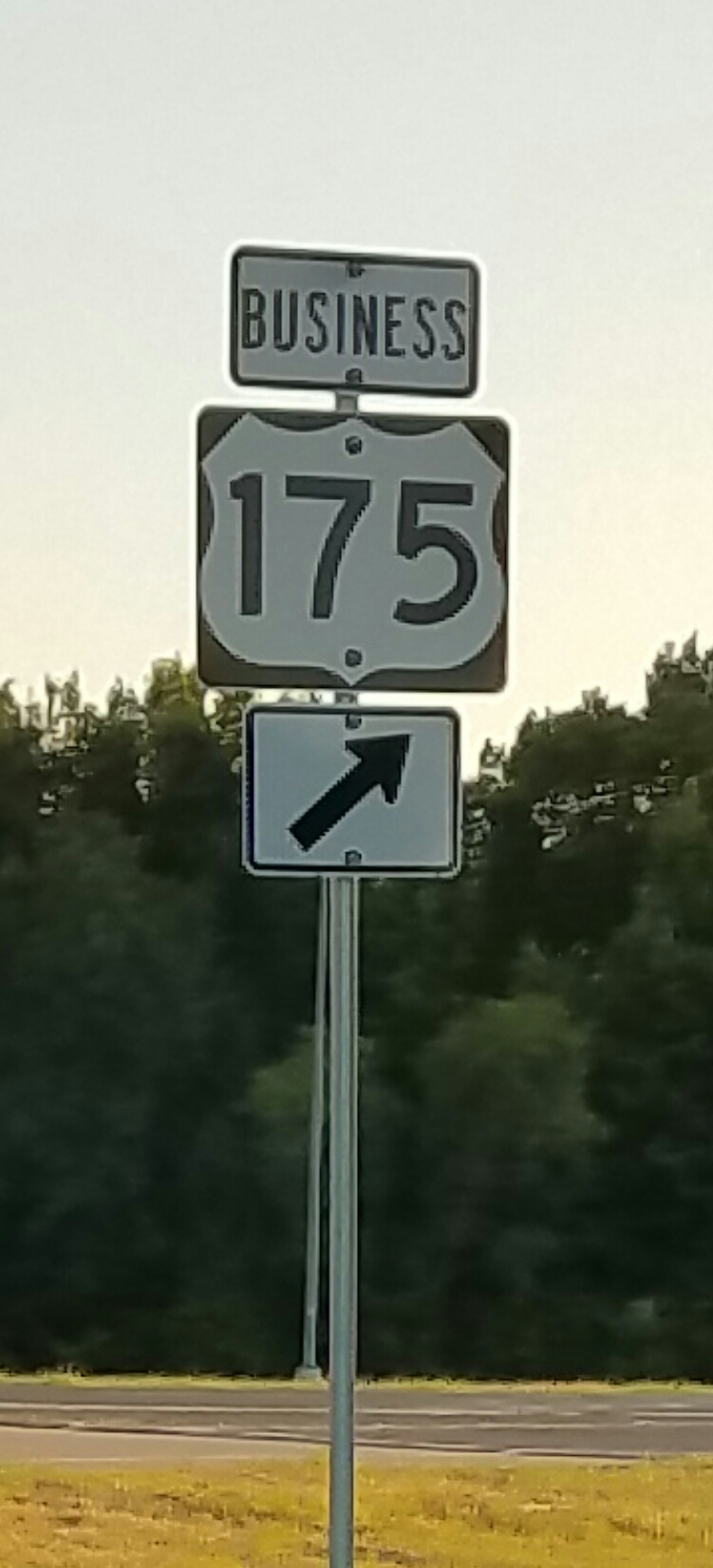
Sign display for Business US 175-G at its southeast terminus in Athens

There are currently four business routes of U.S. Highway 175.

Business U.S. Highway 175-D (formerly Loop 346) is a business loop that goes east into Kemp from its intersection of US 175 west. The route runs along Elm Street to an intersection with State Highway 274, then turns left to go north, overlapped with SH 274, until intersecting again with US 175. Most of the route is part of a previous route of US 175. The Business route was created in 1991 and is 2.432 miles (3.914 km) long.

Business U.S. Highway 175-E is a business loop that runs through Mabank. This route runs on Mason Street, along a previous route of US 175, past an intersection with State Highway 198 until intersecting again with US 175. The business route was created in 1991 when US 175 was rerouted further north and east around town. The route is 2.935 miles (4.723 km) long.

Business U.S. Highway 175-G is a business loop that runs through Athens. This route runs southeast on a previous routing of US 175 from an intersection of US 175 west / State Highway 31 / Loop 7, to an intersection with Business SH 31, then turns left where the two routes overlap on Corsicana Street. At the center of town by the courthouse square, Business SH 31 turns left away from Business US 175-G. The road passes an intersection with Business SH 19 on the east side of the square, then proceeds east, then later curves to the southeast, eventually intersecting again with US 175 / Loop 7 (as well as State Highway 19). The route was created in 2004 when US 175 was rerouted to go to the north and east of Athens on Loop 7. Business US 175-G is 4.871 miles (7.839 km) long.

Business U.S. Highway 175-H is a business loop that passes through the town of Poynor. This route runs southeast on a previous routing of US 175 from an intersection of US 175 on the west side of town, past an intersection with Farm to Market Road 315, then intersecting again with US 175 on the east side of Poynor. The route was created in 2019 after US 175 was rerouted on a new bypass alignment to the south and east of town. Business US 175-H is 1 mile (1.6 km) long.

=== Former Business routes ===
There is one former Business Route along US 175. Business U.S. Highway 175-B was located in Crandall between 1992 and 2002 and was 0.6 miles (0.97 km) long. The route went southeast along Main Street from an intersection with the eastbound service road of US 175, to an intersection with Trunk Street, then turned left (northeast) until another intersection with the eastbound service road of US 175. This route had been previously designated Loop 219 before 1992; since 2002, though, the portions along Main and Trunk have been maintained by the city of Crandall.

== History ==
An early figure in the formation of what would become US 175 was William Richardson, who settled with his family on land just northwest of Athens in late 1855. Richardson was called upon to help map out an early road path between Athens and Kaufman. The routing US 175 takes now in that area is based in part on what Richardson helped to plan.

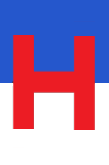
Hobby Highway logo, which marked the auto trail's path at various roadside points.

For a time during the auto trails era, much or most of the path of today's US 175 was part of the Hobby Highway. It followed a path from southeast Texas, through Beaumont, Nacogdoches, Jacksonville, Dallas, and on to Gainesville. It is uncertain how long the Hobby Highway naming was in existence, nor how well and often it was marked and signed.

Early style of signage used on State Highway 40 prior to when US 175 was commissioned.

Before 1920, and subsequently into the 1930s, a state highway, SH 40, existed from Beaumont to the Texas-Oklahoma border. The routing of SH 40 included a portion between Dallas and Jacksonville. It was this portion that became U.S. Highway 175 by July 1932. The other parts of SH 40 became parts of other US highways (US 77 north of Dallas by 1926; US 271 south of Jacksonville from 1930 to 1934, when the designation transitioned to US 69) as well (Map sources into at least the mid-1930s show a co-signing of US 175 and SH 40 along US 175's entire route; it is unclear whether these were mapping mistakes of some kind or if the two designations were allowed as an orientative transition, if so, it is unclear as to for how long.). Traces of SH 40's pre-US 175 route exist on 2 street signs, one near Cedar Creek Country Club (between Kemp and Mabank), the other just off SH 274 on the edge of Kemp. These changes phased out the SH 40 designation until almost 60 years later, when a short portion of highway in College Station was given the SH 40 designation in 1994.

As the U.S. system of highways was beginning to spread across the country, there were some routes—and routings—still to be decided. US Highway 77 was one of those. It had made it as far south as Dallas by 1930, but there would be more of it to the south to come. So far in Texas, the path to Dallas for US 77 was along SH 40's route. A petition with over 1000 signatures favoring the extension of US 77 along SH 40 between Dallas and Jacksonville was brought to a September 1930 meeting of the Texas Highway Commission. The delegation heading up the presentation of the petition included W.W. Gibbard, president of the Highway No. 77 Association, R.A. Thompson with the Dallas Chamber of Commerce, and W.R. Cousins of Beaumont, a state Senator. At the meeting, the Commission went on to pass an order requesting the executive committee of AASHO (the American Association of State Highway Officials; now called AASHTO) to consider the US 77 extension. It is not exactly clear what eventually took place with the extension request, but US 77 would go on to be extended southward, toward Waco instead of toward Jacksonville, and of course, US 175 ended up being the numeric designation of the Dallas to Jacksonville SH 40 segment almost 2 years later.

In 1988, the portion of US 75 between Galveston and Dallas was truncated; this included much of South Central Expressway south of downtown. In US 75's place, US 175 was extended north from the South Central-C.F. Hawn interchange to I-45; a separate numbering, SH 310, was used for the portion of South Central south of US 175. The state decreed in the mid-1990s that all of South Central Expressway south of I-45 be renamed for Sylvester (S.M.) Wright, who grew up just south of the future Hawn Freeway, in the Bon Ton neighborhood of South Dallas. A pastor at Peoples Missionary Baptist Church, Rev. Wright was influential in his community towards solutions dealing with race in the late 1950s and into the 1960s. George W. Bush, Texas' governor at the time, was in attendance for the rededication ceremony of the freeway. On April 25, 2013, a minute order was issued by the state Transportation Commission authorizing the change of designation for US 175 to a new direct routing west to I-45. This extension is currently under construction.

At a meeting of the Texas Transportation Commission in January 2015, a minute order was issued authorizing the increase of US 175 speed limits in Kaufman County. In a reversal of what had been a reduction in 2001 of speed limits because of emissions concerns, the commissioners approved the change to a 70 mile per hour speed limit for the whole county. Previously, the part of US 175 between the Dallas County-Kaufman County line and the east side of Crandall had a 60 mile per hour speed limit; while the part from Crandall to the Kaufman County-Henderson County line in Mabank had a 65 mile per hour limit beforehand. By mid-April 2015, updated speed limit signs were in place in the affected area.

=== Construction projects ===
- In the 1950s, one of the first improvements along US 175 in Dallas occurred at a signal-lighted intersection in Pleasant Grove; it was the site of several previous accidents. The intersection was made into a freeway-style exit with grade separation and ramps. At the time of construction, US 175 had a vehicles-per-day count of more than 10,000 at the intersection. Right of way there, went from a width of 120 feet (37 m) to 300 feet (91 m). The project commenced in February 1956, and was completed in March 1957. It is at the present-day site of the Loop 12-Buckner Blvd. exit off US 175.
- Not long after work commenced on the new freeway exit in Pleasant Grove, a new machine was being used for installing curbs of concrete down the center of streets surrounding the courthouse square in Athens. One of the streets was Corsicana Street, which was the through-town path of US 175 at the time (now Business US 175).
- In January 1964, a new west terminus was completed, connecting South Central Expressway with Second Avenue. This formed one of the first freeway segments in Dallas on US 175. It also, for the first time, bypassed sections of Dallas which had been served since 175 became a US highway some 32 years earlier. No longer would it connect Deep Ellum, Fair Park, or the Second Avenue corridor of South Dallas. The new freeway's namesake, Charles (C.F.) Hawn, was a businessman from Athens who served on the Texas Highway Commission for six years. He was involved in the family's lumber store, as well as banking, ranching, and development. After aiding in funding dilemmas between Dallas County and the city of Dallas, it was decided that the new freeway east of South Central Expressway in Dallas be named for Hawn. He was present at the dedication, which was attended by dignitaries and family from all along Highway 175, including Athens. The same day, a luncheon was held in Hawn's honor at Market Hall in Dallas.
- Eight years later, in January 1972, an interchange with I-635 was completed. The interchange was constructed in a multi-layer "stack" style. I-635 was originally built along the northern, eastern, and southern sides of Dallas east of I-35E, but a transition between the late 1970s and 1990 eventually truncated I-635's southern part back to just north of its interchange with US 175. The freeway that directly crosses at the US 175 interchange is now part of the path of I-20. Charles Hawn was present at the dedication for the interchange.

Along US 175's path, several cities have been bypassed that previously had been served with through-town routings, including Seagoville, Crandall, Kaufman, Kemp, Mabank, and Athens. Other updates to US 175 have included widenings that have transformed much of the highway; it has become freeway over the years between Dallas and Kaufman, while further southeastward, US 175 has been widened to a divided four-lane highway as far as Baxter, in Henderson County.

The bypassed sections in Seagoville and Crandall came in conjunction with a new alignment between the two cities and a higher bridge over the East Fork of the Trinity River. In Kaufman, the bypass was built as a freeway style to the west and south of downtown, where US 175 was previously routed there. The center of Kemp was bypassed to the north and east in an incomplete freeway style. Mabank's bypass came later, with a mostly freeway-style route to the north and east of town. The construction of Loop 7 around Athens was the catalyst for US 175's bypass there; the city decreed that the loop would be made a truck route, so, as such, the city was able to get the state to reroute the designations of each highway serving the town (US 175, State Highway 19 and State Highway 31) to the loop, making each route bypass the city. US 175's portion was signed afterward along the north and east sides of Loop 7. It appears that LaRue may have been first to be bypassed, but it is unclear as to whether it was formulated in the early years of US 175's time, or if it was done while the path was signed as SH 40. The section in question is currently designated as Loop 60.

There have been many sections that have been widened, mostly to a divided four-lane arrangement, while some have four lanes with a left-turn lane in the middle of the highway. From Kaufman to Kemp, a previously two lane section was made into a four lane divided section, with crossovers to access each side of the highway. From Kemp to Mabank, a two lane section was made into a four lane divided section, with crossovers to access each side of the highway, along with new bridge spans over two sections of Cedar Creek Reservoir, which were built for the new westbound lanes. These were built higher than the bridge spans along the original two lane portion. A multi-phase project from Mabank to Athens began in 2006 to make a two lane section into a four lane divided section between Mabank and Eustace, which included a grade-separation for the intersection of US 175 and SH 334, then, a four-lane section with a left-turn lane within Eustace, then the other phase was widening the two-lane Eustace to Athens portion into a divided four lane highway. The work was completed by 2011. During the 1980s, a two-lane section of US 175 between Athens and Baxter was made into a four-lane divided highway.

- Between May 2001 and April 2002, US 175's east terminus was relocated and straightened in Jacksonville. After many years of zigzagging its way to the center of town, the highway was finally rerouted to a new, wider path for its last three blocks prior to the new intersection with US Highway 69. Harold Alexander, a past city council member in Jacksonville, donated land for the straightening and improvements for the new east terminus and was a proponent of the project. The city named the new three-block section for Alexander at its dedication. There had previously been three east termini in Jacksonville: Frankston Street at North Bolton Street until sometime in the 1960s, when US 69 was rerouted off North Bolton; South Jackson at East Rusk Street, at the south end of a new railroad overpass; and North Jackson at Cherokee Street around 1999.
- In October 2016, a new bypass around the south and east parts of Kaufman was completed for State Highway 34; this project included a new exit on US 175. The exit on US 175 at South Washington Street, SH 34's previous routing, became an exit for Business SH 34 after the opening of the new bypass. In August 2018, the SH 34 bypass bridge was named for longtime local Congressman Ralph Hall at a dedication ceremony.
- A three-phase project widened the portion of US 175 between Baxter and Frankston. One phase widened the highway from Baxter to just east of LaRue from a very narrow two-lane section to a four-lane divided highway; this phase began construction in April 2015. The second phase was from LaRue to just east of Poynor; it also made a very narrow two-lane section into a four-lane divided road, with a short service road-style section in front of the LaPoynor School complex, as well as a short bypass of Poynor's downtown area that included a bridge over FM 315; work started on this phase in October 2015. The third of the three phases went from just east of Poynor to Frankston with a widening of a two-lane section to a four-lane divided arrangement. The Poynor–Frankston phase of construction was the last to be completed, in late 2019.
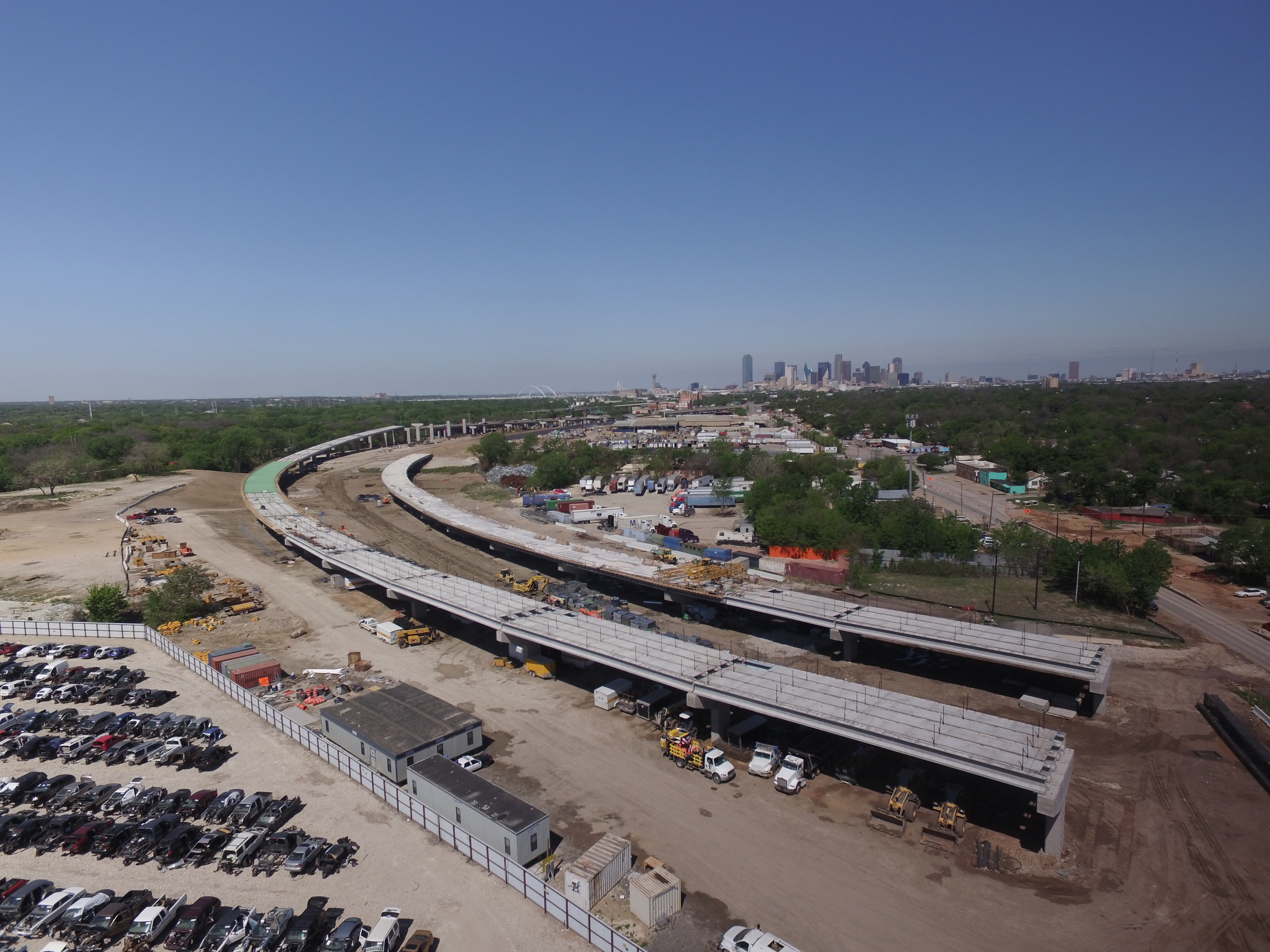
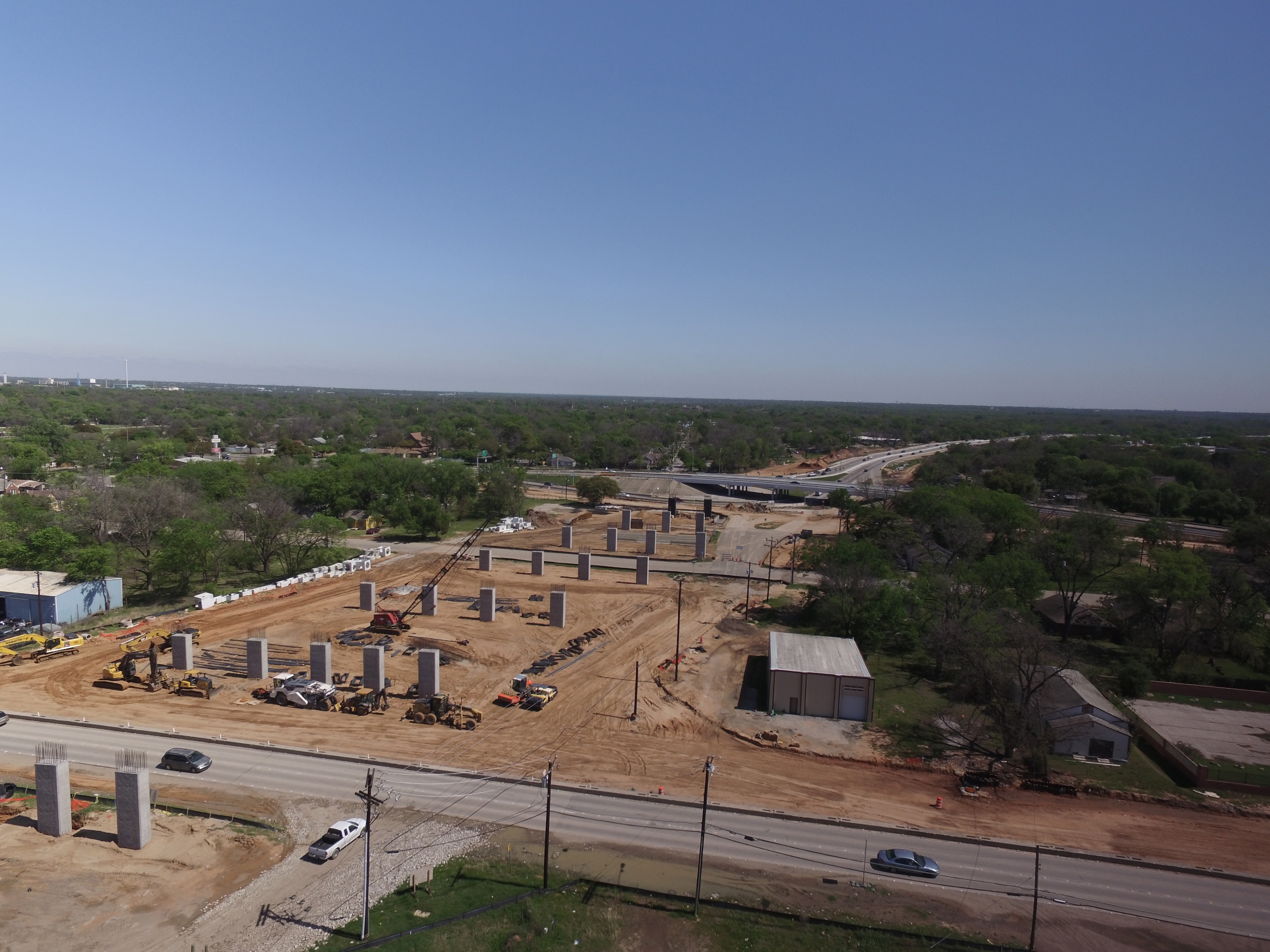
March 2017 construction on US 175 in Dallas:
Left, looking north and west from Lamar Street.
Right, looking east from Lamar Street.
- In 2020, work was completed in South Dallas on a project to reroute US 175 off the S.M. Wright Freeway onto an extension of the C.F. Hawn Freeway. The extension goes from the former 90-degree curve at the S.M. Wright Freeway interchange (colloquially known as the "Dead Man's Curve") westward across South Lamar Street to a new interchange with I-45. This was part of the first phase of a transportation project known as the S.M. Wright Project. This project mainly aims to convert the S.M. Wright Freeway, the former alignment of US 175 through South Dallas, into a six-lane arterial with at-grade intersections. Other associated changes will be made to I-45 just north of the new US 175 interchange. The new interchange was only constructed with ramps from I-45 south to US 175 east and US 175 west to I-45 north. The first ramp from I-45 south to US 175 east was opened to traffic in March 2020 and the other from US 175 west to I-45 in early July 2020.
- In 2021, a project was completed which switched the westbound on-ramp of FM 1389's interchange and westbound off-ramp of the Malloy Bridge Road exit. Previously, each ramp was in close proximity to its crossing/intersection. Since the completion, the Malloy Bridge exit ramp is just west of FM 1389's bridge overpass, and the entrance ramp to westbound US 175 from FM 1389 is now located in about the same placement as the previous off-ramp location for Malloy Bridge Road. None of the other ramps by FM 1389 or Malloy Bridge were switched or changed at that time.

=== Native artifacts unearthed during construction project ===
After construction commenced on a US 175 widening project between Baxter and Frankston, and prior to July 2015, at least three sites were found by construction workers that contained various items which included stone tools and ceramic vessels. Research showed that Natives settled or farmed in these areas between the 1400s and the mid-1600s. As the archeological process was still taking place by July 2015, TxDOT felt it necessary not to disclose the exact locations of the finds to ensure a secure process, as it is against the law to trespass on sites such as those. Construction workers were able to continue their work elsewhere on the widening project as the protected areas were being probed by investigators.

== Future ==
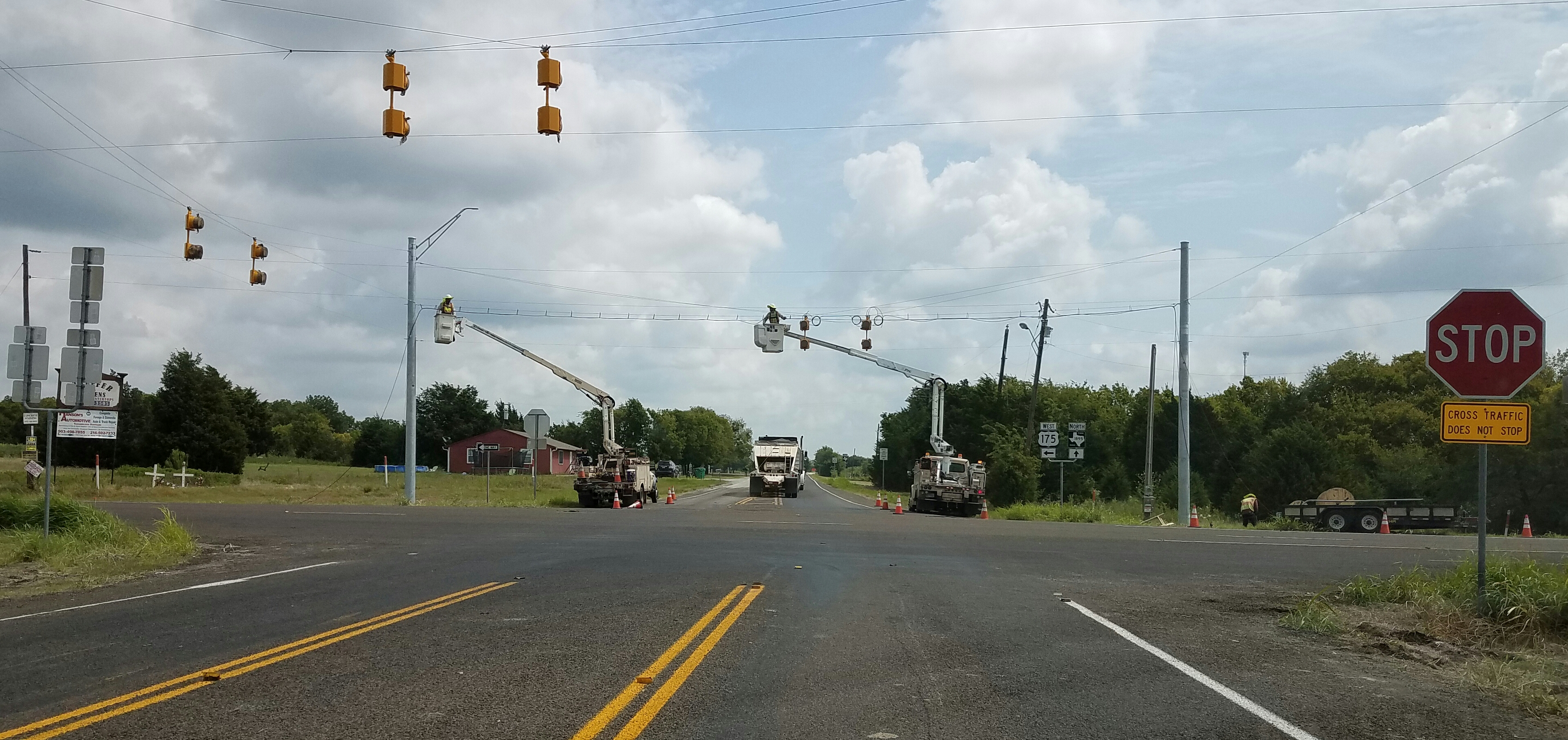
Workers install signals in August 2017 at the US 175/FM 1895 intersection in Kemp. The ones facing FM 1895 will blink red, while US 175 traffic will see yellow flashing signals. This work is likely an interim solution until funding is made available to better improve the intersection.

- There are plans to continue and finish widening the remainder of US 175. The final segment, to be constructed in three phases, is 17 miles (27 km) between Frankston and Jacksonville. Right-of-way acquisition has not been finalized for the portion of the highway between the Neches River and Jacksonville.
- Another project involves adding a missing service road along the south side of US 175 between FM 148 in Crandall and the County Road 4106 exit; it wasn't originally built when US 175 was made a freeway there due to close proximity to a parallel section of the Southern Pacific railroad (which has since been abandoned). Construction is scheduled to begin in 2020 and be completed by 2022.
- In conjunction with the service road project, a plan proposed by TxDOT would build a bypass for FM 148 to the east of the current alignment in Crandall; this would include a new exit and overpass at US 175. A public hearing was held in Crandall in August 2018 to inform residents there about project plans. According to those plans, letting for construction is due to take place by 2021.
- The intersection of FM 2860 between Kaufman and Kemp has been a candidate for years to be upgraded to a grade-separated, freeway-style exit, but funding hasn't been set aside for this project.
- The US 175 bypass of Kemp is the site of another potential project, to make the intersections at Business US 175 west and at FM 1895 into full freeway-style, grade-separated exits, but no funding has been made available.
- A proposal by TxDOT to widen US 175 in Dallas from 6 lanes to 8 lanes between the SH 310 exit and the I-20 interchange is being studied; reportedly no funding is yet available for the project.
- Loop 9, a planned outer loop continuation of the Bush Turnpike, will run between US 67 south of Dallas and I-20 east of Dallas; it is due to intersect with US 175 east of the Malloy Bridge Road exit in Seagoville.
- A TxDOT project that would improve the US 175/I-20 interchange has been proposed. There are no specifics as of yet, other than the affected span (from the Masters Road exit east to the Edd Road exit), and the amount of funding it may need ($200 million) to complete it. No timeline has yet been posted, nor have any designs been made public.

=== Current construction ===
- Work is due to begin on East Corsicana Street (Business US 175-G) in Athens; TxDOT wants to change the lane arrangement between the downtown square and the beginning of the divided four-lane section on the east side of town. East Corsicana has been a four-lane street up to now, but the change will make the street two-lane with a left-turn lane. There have been reports of accidents on this part of Business US 175-G in the past due to no turn lanes.
- Work began in 2022 to widen US 175 to 4 lanes between Frankston and the Neches River. As of January 2023, several portions alongside the current highway were being cleared, but those were not yet the site of new construction. In Frankston, meanwhile, the US 175 eastbound lanes east of the SH 155 intersection were blocked off to traffic and the pavement had been removed.
- Work began in 2022 on a new bridge span of the Neches River at the Anderson County-Cherokee County line. This phase will add 2 westbound lanes across the river when completed.

== Major intersections ==
County	Location	mi	km	Destinations	Notes
Dallas	Dallas	0.0	0.0	I-45 north – Dallas	Westbound exit and eastbound entrance; I-45 exit 282; western terminus
Dallas	Dallas	1.9	3.1	SH 310 (S. M. Wright Freeway) / Botham Jean Boulevard	Westbound exit and eastbound entrance; SH 310 is old US 75
Dallas	Dallas	2.3	3.7	Bexar Street	Westbound exit only
Dallas	Dallas	2.8	4.5	Railroad Avenue	Westbound exit and eastbound entrance
Dallas	Dallas	2.6	4.2	Municipal Street	Eastbound exit and entrance
Dallas	Dallas	4.0	6.4	Second Avenue / Bruton Road	
Dallas	Dallas	4.8	7.7	Lake June Road	Access to Lake June station
Dallas	Dallas	5.4	8.7	Frontage Road	Eastbound exit only
Dallas	Dallas	5.8	9.3	Jim Miller Road	Westbound exit via the Elam Road exit
Dallas	Dallas	6.3	10.1	Elam Road	
Dallas	Dallas	7.2	11.6	Loop 12 (Buckner Boulevard)	Access to Buckner station
Dallas	Dallas	8.2	13.2	Frontage Road	Westbound exit only
Dallas	Dallas	7.7	12.4	Prairie Creek Road	Westbound exit via the St. Augustine Road exit
Dallas	Dallas	8.8	14.2	St. Augustine Road	
Dallas	Dallas	9.4	15.1	Masters Drive	
Dallas	Dallas	10.1	16.3	Haymarket Road / Kleberg Road	No eastbound entrance
Dallas	Balch Springs	10.4	16.7	I-20 / I-635 north – Fort Worth, Shreveport, Mesquite, Garland	I-20 exit 479
Dallas	Dallas	11.3	18.2	Silverado Drive	
Dallas	Dallas	12.0	19.3	Edd Road	
Dallas	Dallas	12.4	20.0	Belt Line Road	
Dallas	Dallas	12.9	20.8	Woody Road	No direct westbound exit; no direct eastbound entrance
Dallas	Seagoville	13.6	21.9	Stark Road	
Dallas	Seagoville	11.7	18.8	Simonds Road / Kimberly Drive	
Dallas	Seagoville	15.4	24.8	Seagoville Road / Kaufman Street	
Dallas	Seagoville	16.3	26.2	Hall Street	
Dallas	Seagoville	17.0	27.4	Malloy Bridge Road	
Kaufman	Seagoville	18.4	29.6	FM 1389 – Combine	
Kaufman	Crandall	21.0	33.8	FM 741 – Forney	
Kaufman	Crandall	21.8	35.1	FM 148 – Crandall	
Kaufman	Crandall	24.9	40.1	County Road 4106 / Bud Stoy Road	
Kaufman	Kaufman	27.3	43.9	FM 1390	
Kaufman	Kaufman	28.5	45.9	FM 2578	
Kaufman	Kaufman	29.7	47.8	Frontage Road	
Kaufman	Kaufman	30.5	49.1	SH 243 – Kaufman, Canton	No eastbound entrance; access to Texas Health Presbyterian Kaufman
Kaufman	Kaufman	31.4	50.5	Oak Grove	No eastbound entrance; former FM 1388
Kaufman	Kaufman	31.8	51.2	Bus. SH 34 – Kaufman	No direct westbound exit or entrance
Kaufman	Kaufman	32.3	52.0	SH 34 – Terrell, Ennis	Eastern end of freeway
Kaufman		37.3	60.0	FM 2860	
Kaufman	Kemp	40.2	64.7	Bus. US 175 east – Kemp	
Kaufman	Kemp	41.2	66.3	FM 1895 (Ninth Street)	
Kaufman	Kemp	42.0	67.6	Bus. US 175 west / SH 274 / FM 1391 – Kemp, Seven Points	Interchange
Kaufman	Mabank	48.9	78.7	Bus. US 175 east – Mabank	
Kaufman	Mabank	50.5	81.3	SH 198 – Mabank, Gun Barrel City	Interchange
Henderson	Mabank	52.1	83.8	Bus. US 175 west – Mabank	
Henderson	Gun Barrel City	55.0	88.5	SH 334 west – Gun Barrel City	Interchange
Henderson	Eustace	57.5	92.5	FM 316 south / Walker Street – Malakoff	Western end of FM 316 concurrency
Henderson	Eustace	57.8	93.0	FM 316 north / Pine Street – Phalba, Purtis Creek State Park	Eastern end of FM 316 concurrency
Henderson		63.8	102.7	RM 2329 west	
Henderson	Athens	67.9	109.3	Bus. US 175 east / SH 31 west / Loop 7 west – Corsicana, Athens	Interchange; western end of SH 31/Loop 7 concurrency; access to Athens Municipal Airport and UT Health-Athens
Henderson	Athens	69.6	112.0	SH 19 north (SH 19 Bus. south) – Canton	Interchange; western end of SH 19 concurrency
Henderson	Athens	71.3	114.7	FM 1616 – Murchison	
Henderson	Athens	72.0	115.9	SH 31 east (SH 31 Bus. west) – Tyler	Interchange; eastern end of SH 31 concurrency
Henderson	Athens	73.5	118.3	FM 2495	Interchange
Henderson	Athens	75.1	120.9	Bus. US 175 west / SH 19 south / Loop 7 south – Palestine, Athens	Interchange; eastern end of SH 19/Loop 7 concurrency; access to Athens Municipal Airport and UT Health-Athens
Henderson		79.4	127.8	FM 804 east – Baxter	
Henderson	Larue	84.3	135.7	Loop 60 to FM 607 – Larue, Brownsboro	
Henderson	Larue	84.7	136.3	RM 2588 south	
Henderson	Larue	85.1	137.0	Loop 60 to FM 607 – Larue, Brownsboro	
Henderson	Poynor	89.5	144.0	Bus. US 175 east to FM 315 – Chandler, Palestine	
Henderson	Poynor	90.5	145.6	Bus. US 175 west to FM 315 – Chandler, Palestine	
Anderson	Frankston	95.7	154.0	SH 155 – Tyler, Palestine	
Anderson		99.3	159.8	FM 1892 north – Lake Palestine, Berryville	
Cherokee		102.3	164.6	FM 855 east – Mount Selman	Just east of Cuney
Cherokee	Jacksonville	110.8	178.3	FM 347 (North Bolton Street)	
Cherokee	Jacksonville	111.0	178.6	US 69 (North Jackson Street)	Eastern terminus; access to UT Health-Jacksonville and Christus Trinity Mother Frances Hospital Jacksonville
1.000 mi = 1.609 km; 1.000 km = 0.621 mi: Concurrency terminus; Incomplete access; Unopened

== In popular culture ==
- In the reality series Police Women of Dallas, during transitions between scenes and in return-from-commercial-break bumpers, occasional evening shots of US 175 entrance ramps (signage included) could be seen, with the Dallas skyline lit up in the background.
- The Route 66 episode "1800 Days to Justice" was filmed in Crandall, and used a previous routing of US 175 (Trunk Street) in one scene.

== See also ==
- List of Dallas–Fort Worth-area freeways
