= Prairieville, Texas =

- Unincorporated community
- Location within Texas Location within the United States
- Coordinates: 32°28′47″N 96°06′11″W
- Country: United States
- State: Texas
- County: Kaufman
- Elevation: 397 ft (121 m)
- Time zone: UTC-6 (Central (CST))
  - Summer (DST): UTC-5 (CDT)
- GNIS feature ID: 1378906

Prairieville is an unincorporated community in Kaufman County, Texas. According to the Handbook of Texas, the community had a population of 50 in 2000. It is located within the Dallas-Fort Worth metropolitan area.

== History ==
A Norwegian colony in Texas led by Johan Reinert Reiersen moved from Henderson County to the Four Mile Prairie in Kaufman and Van Zandt counties in 1848. It resulted in the establishment of Prairieville after they built homes and farms on the land. In the community's first years an epidemic swept through the area in the 1850s, and the survivors moved to Bosque County. The Prairieville community itself survived, which had a population of 206 by 1900 before it plunged to 50 in 1924. The community had several stores and businesses over the years, which included gristmills, cotton gins, general merchandise stores, carding and furniture factories and blacksmith shops. A post office was established at Prairieville in 1854 and remained in operation until 1954 with only one brief interruption. Prairieville was a quiet neighborhood of rural homes and had only one country store and a historical marker. The population remained at 50 in 1990 and 2000.

The community had a church established in 1848 by local settlers. Resident Erick Bache built a hotel and had other jobs such as postmaster and was a station leader on two rail lines. Eighty people of Norwegian heritage lived in Prairieville in 1857, while the rest were from other European countries such as Denmark, France, Germany and Sweden.

== Geography ==
Prairieville is located at the intersection of Farm to Market Roads 1836 and 90 near the Van Zandt County line, 8 mi (13 km) north of Mabank and 14 mi (23 km) southeast of Kaufman in the southeastern portion of Kaufman County.

== Education ==
Prairieville had its own school in the 1850s and remained in operation until it joined the Mabank Independent School District in 1949. The community continues to be served by the Mabank ISD to this day.
