= Reiersen =

Reiersen is a surname. Notable people with the surname include:

- Eivind Reiersen (1877–1947), Norwegian newspaper editor and politician
- Johan Reinert Reiersen (1810–1864), Norwegian-American writer, author, and publisher
- Niels Lunde Reiersen (1742–1795), Danish government official and merchant
