= Texas State Highway 243 =

State highway in Texas

State Highway 243
- SH 243, highlighted in red

Route information
- Maintained by TxDOT
- Length: 27.909 mi (44.915 km)
- Existed: 1937–present

Major junctions
- West end: US 175 in Kaufman
- East end: SH 64 in Canton

Location
- Country: United States
- State: Texas

Highway system
- Highways in Texas; Interstate; US; State; Former; Toll; Loops; Spurs; FM/RM; Park; Rec
← SH 242	→ SH 244

State Highway 243 (SH 243) is a state highway that runs from Kaufman east to Canton. The route was designated on February 10, 1937 from Kaufman through Canton to Van, replacing a section of SH 110, which was rerouted off of this road. The section from Canton to Van was removed on March 26, 1942 when it was transferred to FM 16. On May 23, 1951, FM 1654 was designated from SH 243 & SH 198 to SH 64. When completed, FM 1654 was signed, but not designated, as SH 243. On July 16, 1957, SH 243 was extended west to new US 175. On August 29, 1990, SH 243 was extended to SH 64 over FM 1654.

== Junction list ==
County	Location	mi	km	Destinations	Notes
Kaufman	Kaufman			US 175 – Dallas, Athens	Western terminus
Kaufman	Kaufman			FM 987 (N. Jefferson St.)	
Kaufman	Kaufman			SH 34 south (S. Washington St.) – Ennis	West end of SH 34 concurrency
Kaufman	Kaufman			SH 34 north (Terrell Hwy.) – Terrell	East end of SH 34 concurrency
Kaufman				FM 2727	
Kaufman				FM 2515	
Kaufman				FM 429	
Van Zandt				FM 47	
Van Zandt	Canton			SH 198 (S. Buffalo St.) – Mabank	
Van Zandt	Canton			SH 19 (S. Trade Days Blvd.) – Athens, Emory	
Van Zandt	Canton			SH 64 (E. Dallas St.) – Wills Point, Tyler	Eastern terminus
1.000 mi = 1.609 km; 1.000 km = 0.621 mi: Concurrency terminus
