= Eustace Independent School District =

School district in Texas

Eustace Independent School District is a public school district based in Eustace, Texas (United States).

In addition to Eustace, the district serves most of the cities of Payne Springs, Enchanted Oaks, Log Cabin, and a small portion of Gun Barrel City.

In 2009, the school district was rated "academically acceptable" by the Texas Education Agency.

== Schools ==
- Eustace High (Grades 9–12)
- Eustace Junior High (Grades 6–8)
- Eustace Intermediate (Grades 3–5)
- Eustace Primary (Grades PK–2)

== Band ==
The Eustace High School Band, or "The Rhythm Machine on 316" (a reference to Farm to Market Road 316, on which the school is located), is a first-class program at Eustace High School. Under the direction of Todd Felty and Crystal Heidle. The band has had many talented players, many of which have made the ATSSB all-region, area, and all-state bands. The band is most well known for its marching. It has been awarded a division one marching grade in 2004, 2006, 2010 and 2013. The division one grade enables the band to go to the area marching band contest. Their 2013 season started out really well earning a 1st division at the mesquite marching festival for the first time in about 15 years, the band also received a first division and third place at the CCMF festival, and also earned a first division at UIL and advanced to area that year.

=== Marching shows ===
- In 2003 the band presented the Santana show. (This was not an area qualifying year.)
- In 2004 the Blockbuster hits show used songs from Harry Potter, The Lord of the Rings, and Pirates of the Caribbean. The band received a rating of one at the competition and advanced to the Area Marching Competition. The show also starred all-state french horn player Meagan Felty as a soloist.
- In 2005 the band played The Incredibles, from the Pixar film. Though not an area qualifying year the band boasted solos from all-region jazz trumpeters Pablo Lowry and Doyle Martindale.
- In 2006 the band introduced The Rise and Fall of Rome by Key Poulan; the show was one of the more challenging in Eustace Band's memorable history, with approximately fifty sets. The band started out a bit rough, but pulled it together and came away with a division one. At the Area Marching Competition the band had its best performance yet, and in the judges and other bands' eyes the best ending.
- In 2007 the band played its The Beatles show. Featuring Solos from Brian "Fireman" Herbert, All-Area jazz and concert trumpet player Alex Pharmakis, and all-state tuba player Corey Owens
- In 2008 the band played The Adventures of Superspy. Featuring solos from Brian "Fireman" Herbert and All-Area jazz and concert trumpet player Alex Pharmakis
- In 2009 the band played Cirque de Soleil's Journey of Man. Featuring a solo from All-Area jazz and concert trumpet player Alex Pharmakis.
- In 2010 the band played Barry Hurts "Rock Phases"
- In 2011 the band played an original piece that was composed just for them called " The digital age "
- In 2012 the band played their "Santana Smooth" show featuring music from Carlos Santana
- In 2013 the band played Barry Hurts "Mysteries of the Nile" from the Imax 3D documentary film based on the Nile River of Egypt
