= Randal Tye Thomas =

American politician (1978–2014)

13th Mayor of Gun Barrel City, Texas
- In office May 6, 2000 – May 15, 2001
- Preceded by: Joe Agnes
- Succeeded by: Bob Bennington

Personal details
- Born: August 23, 1978 Terrell, Texas
- Died: January 13, 2014 (aged 35) Providence, Rhode Island
- Party: Democratic (2002 – 2014); Republican (1990s – 2002)
- Education: Johnson & Wales University

Randal Tye Thomas (August 23, 1978 – January 13, 2014) served as Mayor of Gun Barrel City, Texas. He was also a member of the Electoral College in the 2000 Presidential Election.

== Early years ==
Tye Thomas was born August 23, 1978, at a small hospital in Terrell, Texas, and was raised in Mabank, Texas. As a teenager, he was an active member of the Methodist church in Mabank. He began to demonstrate unusually bright entrepreneurial qualities at an early age, and while he was a student at Mabank High School, he founded and published a newspaper known as Cedar Creek Briefs. Years later, he was quoted by a newspaper reporter, and he claimed that he was earning a profit twice as high with his newspaper than his parents' combined annual income. Based on this newspaper, he entered a high school entrepreneur contest sponsored by Johnson & Wales University in Providence, Rhode Island. He won the competition and a full scholarship to the University, where he eventually enrolled as a business student on the Providence campus.

Thomas immediately made himself well known on campus at Johnson & Wales, where the student body numbered approximately 10,000 on the Providence campus. As a freshman, he was elected to serve as the first president of the newly formed College Republicans club. Later, he was elected Student Body President (which made him the leader of the Student Government Association) by a margin of three votes. As a student at Johnson & Wales, Thomas owned a vending route that was rumored to have included a portfolio of almost 100 vending machines scattered all over Rhode Island. He was employed for several years at Coastway Credit Union, where he worked in various positions, including SBA loan generation and as a personal assistant to the President, Reynolds German. He also worked for almost a year as a volunteer in the Executive Offices of then Rhode Island Governor Lincoln Almond.

Thomas graduated from Johnson & Wales in June 1998 with an Associate of Science degree in Business Administration and in November 1999 with a Bachelor of Science degree in Marketing. He immediately moved from Rhode Island to Gun Barrel City, Texas, where he had purchased a lakeside condominium several months prior.

== Mayor of Gun Barrel City ==
In January 2000, Thomas founded Lakeside News, a weekly newspaper in Gun Barrel City. In February 2000, he launched a campaign for Mayor of Gun Barrel City, and he campaigned vigorously for three months. On May 6, 2000, he defeated his only opponent Charles Robinson in the general election in a landslide, winning 67% of the vote. He was twenty-one years old and became the city's youngest Mayor and the youngest Mayor in Texas history.

The first few months of Thomas' administration were marked by significant accomplishment, widespread support, and tremendous local, state, and national media attention. One of his first actions as Mayor was pushing through an immediate 10% pay raise for all police department employees. The Gun Barrel City Council voted at one point to allow the local hospital to raise the cost of an ambulance ride by $200.00, and Thomas vetoed their decision. It was the only time he used his veto power. Two weeks later, the City Council, in a 4–1 vote, was able to override Thomas' veto, and the price increase was ultimately implemented.

Thomas was considered a rising star in the Texas Republican Party. He announced that he would seek the office of State Representative when his term as Mayor ended. At the time, he was a close, personal friend of Congressman Pete Sessions, whom Thomas considered to be a political mentor. He also maintained close relationships with then Texas Comptroller of Public Accounts Carole Keeton Strayhorn, then State Senator Todd Staples, Governor Rick Perry, then State Representative Betty Brown, then Dallas Mayor Ron Kirk, State Senator Bob Deuell, Congressman Joe Barton, then Congressman Tom DeLay, then House Majority Leader Dick Armey, U.S. Senator Kay Bailey Hutchison, then Texas Land Commissioner David Dewhurst, and other elected officials.

Thomas was a member of the Electoral College in the United States presidential election in Texas, 2000. He was elected during the Fifth Congressional District caucus to this position while serving as a delegate to the State Republican Convention, defeating one unknown opponent. When George W. Bush was elected President in 2000, Thomas technically became a Texas Statewide Elected Official for one day when he cast his Electoral vote in Austin, Texas, on December 18, 2000.

== Legal difficulties ==
Community support began to diminish when Henderson County, Texas District Attorney Donna R. Bennett launched an investigation focusing on Thomas. She utilized the Texas Ranger Division of the Texas Department of Public Safety, and the investigators were Texas Ranger Sergeant Steve Foster, assisted by District Attorney Internal Investigator (and now Henderson County Sheriff) Ray Nutt. The allegations included that Thomas misused city equipment for personal gain and perjury.

Bennett presented the case to a Henderson County Grand Jury, who "passed" on the case and declined to issue an indictment, or no bill, of Thomas. In April 2001, a new Grand Jury was impaneled and issued an indictment against Thomas for one count of perjury (a Class A Misdemeanor). The Grand Jury took no action on the allegation of misusing city equipment. The indictment alleged that Thomas lied under oath about how long he had been a resident of Gun Barrel City so he could be eligible to run for Mayor. The same week, Thomas was arrested by the Gun Barrel City Police Department (in a very unusual situation) for Public Intoxication (a Class C Misdemeanor) after he called 911 repeatedly, demanding that the police come and arrest him. The Police arrived at Thomas' home and tried to calm him down, but he insisted on being arrested.

Finally, then Police Chief David McCoy ordered the responding officers to arrest the Mayor, stating that he believed Thomas was "a danger to himself and others". Thomas was transported to the Henderson County Jail instead of the Gun Barrel City jail. Chief David McCoy later told a local newspaper that he made that decision because a nurse was on duty at the County Jail and he wanted Thomas to be monitored by a nurse. Thomas was granted a phone call when he arrived at the Henderson County Jail. It was approximately 2:00 am and Thomas called recently elected Justice of the Peace Dale Blaylock at home. The phone call woke Judge Blaylock from his sleep, but Thomas nonetheless asked him to come to the jail right away and arraign him, presumably so Thomas could be released quickly. It was reported in a local newspaper that Judge Blaylock immediately traveled at least thirty miles to the Henderson County Jail in Athens, Texas, and arrived at approximately 3:00 am. He arraigned Thomas first and set his bail at $500.00, the maximum allowed by law for the offense. It was also reported that while Judge Blaylock was at the jail, he arraigned and set bond for all other inmates waiting to see a Judge the following day. It was reported in the local newspaper that Thomas' father, Larry Ray Thomas, was waiting at the jail and posted the $500.00 cash bond only a few minutes after Judge Blaylock set his bail, and Thomas was immediately released.

Thomas later admitted that he mixed alcohol and Xanax (he claimed the Xanax was prescribed by his physician for anxiety) and it caused him to have a bizarre episode and a nervous breakdown. Thomas claimed the stress of the Grand Jury investigation caused him to drink alcohol frequently and abuse Xanax.

== Resignation as mayor ==
Thomas' arrest was the lead story on all Dallas and Tyler, Texas, television news stations for several days after the bizarre arrest for public intoxication. A few days later, with his criminal attorney Mike Head and his brother, sister, and father by his side, Thomas held a televised press conference in front of Gun Barrel City Hall, and he used the opportunity to harshly criticize District Attorney Donna R. Bennett for the indictment and her investigation. He claimed at the press conference he had proof that her office sent investigators to Providence, Rhode Island, to investigate his activities while a student at Johnson & Wales University. There were approximately 100 people in attendance at the press conference, including every television station from Dallas and Tyler and all regional newspapers. Many citizens - and even some of the City Council members who originally supported Thomas - demanded his resignation. Thomas, however, insisted he would not resign and he would fight the perjury charge.

A few weeks later, however, after serving for 54 weeks, Thomas submitted his resignation as Mayor to City Secretary Christy Eckerman. All criminal charges associated with the District Attorney and Texas Ranger investigation were dismissed by County Court at Law Judge Matt Livingston at the recommendation of then County Attorney James Owen.

After his resignation, Thomas and the community were featured in dozens of publications and programs, including a feature story in Texas Monthly and a long interview on the popular national radio program This American Life, as well as feature stories by the Fort Worth Star Telegram, The Dallas Morning News, the Tyler Morning Telegraph, the Corpus Christi Caller Times, the Houston Chronicle, the Austin American Statesman, the San Antonio Express-News, and many other media outlets. Two students from the University of North Texas created a thirty-minute documentary called "Political Confusion" that told the story about Thomas and his short political career.

== Later life and death ==
Thomas met and became close friends with legendary swindler and convicted felon Billie Sol Estes after his resignation. The following year, Thomas campaigned for a seat on the Gun Barrel City Council but lost because he garnered only 14 votes. Thomas had Estes come to Gun Barrel City for a press conference, where Estes enthusiastically endorsed Thomas.

Thomas moved to the Dallas County, Texas, area in 2002, where he found employment teaching business courses at small colleges. He switched political parties and became a Democrat, and was active in the Dallas County Young Democrats, who featured Thomas as the keynote speaker at one of their monthly meetings. He was elected a Democratic Precinct Chair several times and was appointed twice by the Dallas County Commissioner's Court to serve as an Election Judge. He also left the Methodist Church and Christianity altogether and became a Unitarian Universalist. He and his wife, Catherine, to whom he was engaged while he served as Mayor and eventually married in 2003, were granted a divorce in Dallas County, Texas in November 2005.

Mr. Thomas relocated to Providence, Rhode Island. On January 13, 2014, he was found dead by the Providence Police Department in his residence.
