= Payne Springs, Texas =

- Town
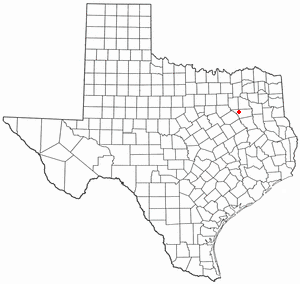
- Location of Payne Springs, Texas

- Coordinates: 32°16′32″N 96°06′40″W
- Country: United States
- State: Texas
- County: Henderson

Area
  - Total: 2.12 sq mi (5.48 km^{2})
  - Land: 2.11 sq mi (5.47 km^{2})
  - Water: 0.0039 sq mi (0.01 km^{2})
- Elevation: 367 ft (112 m)

Population (2020)
  - Total: 741
  - Density: 351/sq mi (135/km^{2})
- Time zone: UTC-6 (Central (CST))
  - Summer (DST): UTC-5 (CDT)
- Area codes: 903, 430
- FIPS code: 48-56276
- GNIS feature ID: 2413120
- Website: paynespringstx.com

Payne Springs is a town in Henderson County, Texas, United States. The population was 741 at the 2020 census, down from 767 at the 2010 census.

== Geography ==
Payne Springs is located in northwestern Henderson County on the east side of Cedar Creek Reservoir, north of Enchanted Oaks and south of Gun Barrel City. Texas State Highway 198 is the main road through the town.

According to the United States Census Bureau, Payne Springs has a total area of 2.0 square miles (5.2 km^{2}), of which 1.1 acres (4,516 m^{2}), or 0.09%, are water.

== Demographics ==
Historical population
Census	Pop.	Note	%±
1980	422		—
1990	606		43.6%
2000	683		12.7%
2010	767		12.3%
2020	741		−3.4%
U.S. Decennial Census; 2020 Census

As of the census of 2000, there were 683 people, 272 households, and 196 families residing in the town. The population density was 361.6 inhabitants per square mile (139.6/km^{2}). There were 369 housing units at an average density of 195.4 per square mile (75.4/km^{2}). The racial makeup of the town was 94.44% White, 1.02% African American, 1.32% Native American, 0.59% Asian, 0.15% from other races, and 2.49% from two or more races. Hispanic or Latino of any race were 1.46% of the population.

There were 272 households, out of which 26.8% had children under the age of 18 living with them, 59.6% were married couples living together, 8.5% had a female householder with no husband present, and 27.6% were non-families. 22.4% of all households were made up of individuals, and 11.4% had someone living alone who was 65 years of age or older. The average household size was 2.51 and the average family size was 2.89.

In the town, the population was spread out, with 22.8% under the age of 18, 7.6% from 18 to 24, 24.2% from 25 to 44, 25.0% from 45 to 64, and 20.4% who were 65 years of age or older. The median age was 42 years. For every 100 females, there were 98.0 males. For every 100 females age 18 and over, there were 93.0 males.

The median income for a household in the town was $33,269, and the median income for a family was $34,688. Males had a median income of $40,455 versus $21,146 for females. The per capita income for the town was $15,451. About 12.8% of families and 15.1% of the population were below the poverty line, including 17.0% of those under age 18 and 13.4% of those age 65 or over.

== Education ==
The town of Payne Springs is served by the Mabank Independent School District and Eustace Independent School District.
