= Mabank High School =

Coordinates: 32.3726°N 96.1095°W

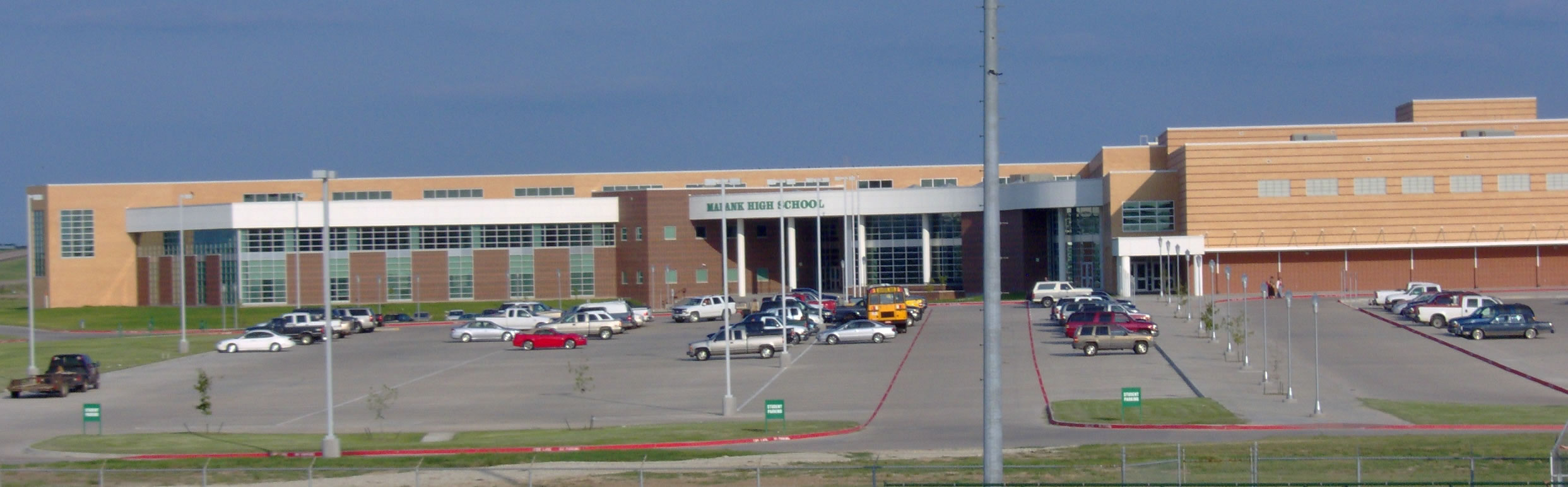

Location
- 18786 East Highway 175; Mabank, Texas 77147; United States

Information
- School type: Public high school
- School district: Mabank Independent School District
- Principal: Michael Rowland
- Teaching staff: 84.14 (FTE)
- Grades: 9-12
- Enrollment: 1,150 (2023–2024)
- Student to teacher ratio: 13.67
- Colors: Green, white, and black
- Athletics conference: UIL Class AAAA (4A)
- Mascot: Panther
- Newspaper: The Paw Print
- Yearbook: Panther
- Website: Mabank High School

Mabank High School is a public high school located in the city of Mabank, Texas, United States and classified as a 4A school by the University Interscholastic League (UIL). It is a part of the Mabank Independent School District located in central Kaufman County. In addition to the city of Mabank, the school serves southeast Kaufman, southwest Van Zandt, and northwest Henderson counties, including the community of Gun Barrel City and parts of Seven Points. In 2022–23, the school was rated by the Texas Education Agency as follows: 86 (B) overall, 83 (B) for Student Achievement, 85 (B) for School Progress, and 88 (B) for Closing the Gaps. It also was designated with distinction in Academic Achievement in Mathematics and Top 25%: Comparative Closing the Gaps.

== Athletics ==
The Mabank Panthers compete in these sports:

Volleyball, Cross Country, Football, Basketball, Powerlifting, Soccer, Golf, Tennis, Track, Baseball & Softball

=== State Titles ===
- Boys Golf
  - 1988(3A)

=== Golf ===
1971-1972 Ryan Keith Hamilton won the 1A individual state Championship.

1987-1988 3A Team State Champions.

=== 2007 ===
==== Band ====
The Mabank Panther Band placed 7th in Class 2A at Bands of America Grand Nationals. The Mabank High School Symphonic Band, the JV band, competed at UIL and made straight 1's in concert and sight reading. The Mabank High School Wind Symphony, the varsity band, competed at UIL and made straight 1's in concert and sight reading. The band had many people compete at the All-Region contest and had 17 students place in the All-Region band including Craig Chapman who placed 1st chair in timpani in Region 3 and Shelby Smith who advanced to the All-State band.

==== 2009 ====
November 9 - Mabank Band's very own drum line, entered the Lone Star Percussion contest in Lewisville, Texas and came in fourth out of twenty other drum lines. They also won "Best tenor line." Earlier this year, the Mabank Drum Line took third in the Plano Drumline Competition.

==== Football ====
The 2009 Mabank varsity football team won the 13-3A Bi-District championship game.

District Championships 1975 13-2A, 1978 13-2A, 2006 13-3A

==== Volleyball ====
During the 2007 Volleyball season, Mabank's Lady Panthers won the district 13-3A All District Volleyball team selections with a 10-0 season.

==== Women's Soccer ====
2012 Varsity Girls soccer team were the district champs. 14-4A District, Area, Sectional champs. and regional quarter-finalists

== See also ==
- Mabank Independent School District
- Mabank, Texas
- Gun Barrel City, Texas
- Seven Points, Texas
- Cedar Creek Reservoir (Texas)
