= Eustace High School =

Coordinates: 32.3029°N 96.0081°W

Location
- 318 FM 316 S Eustace, Texas 75124-0188; United States

Information
- School type: Public high school
- School district: Eustace Independent School District
- Principal: Stan Sowers
- Staff: 43.69 (FTE)
- Grades: 9-12
- Enrollment: 466 (2023–2024)
- Student to teacher ratio: 10.67
- Colors: Purple & Gold
- Athletics conference: UIL Class 3A
- Mascot: Bulldog
- Website: Eustace High School

Eustace High School is a public high school located in Eustace, Texas, United States and classified as a 3A school by the University Interscholastic League (UIL). It is part of the Eustace Independent School District located in northwestern Henderson County. In 2015, the school was rated "Met Standard" by the Texas Education Agency.

== Athletics ==
The Eustace Bulldogs compete in these sports -

Cross Country, Volleyball, Football, Basketball, Powerlifting, Golf, Track, Softball & Baseball

=== State titles ===
- Girls Cross Country
  - 2013(2A), 2014(3A)

== Academics ==
The Eustace Bulldogs compete in all offered UIL Academic competitive fields, and Colby Bracken won second in Ready Writing in the 2023-2024 academic year. -
