= Gun Barrel City, Texas =

- Town
- Flag Logo

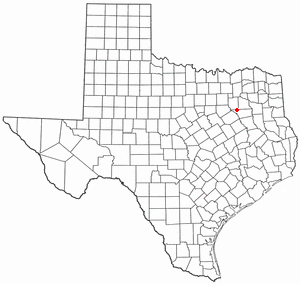
- Location of Gun Barrel City, Texas

- Coordinates: 32°19′36″N 96°06′58″W
- Country: United States
- State: Texas
- County: Henderson

Area
  - Total: 6.63 sq mi (17.16 km^{2})
  - Land: 6.25 sq mi (16.20 km^{2})
  - Water: 0.37 sq mi (0.96 km^{2})
- Elevation: 364 ft (111 m)

Population (2020)
  - Total: 6,190
  - Density: 992.7/sq mi (383.28/km^{2})
- Time zone: UTC−6 (Central (CST))
  - Summer (DST): UTC−5 (CDT)
- ZIP Code: 75156
- Area codes: 430, 903
- FIPS code: 48-31592
- GNIS feature ID: 2410673
- Website: gunbarrelcity.gov

Gun Barrel City is a town in Henderson County, Texas, United States. Its population was 6,190 at the 2020 census, an increase over the figure of 5,672 tabulated in 2010.

== History ==
The town began as an unincorporated community known as the "Old Bethel Community" in the 1960s after completion of Cedar Creek Reservoir. It was incorporated in the late 1960s so it could legally sell beer and wine. The town takes its name from a former road, Gun Barrel Lane (which is now State Highway 198), and has as its motto, "We Shoot Straight with You", and its symbol—a rifle with two crossed antique pistols after having to remove Yosemite Sam as its unofficial mascot on its signs along the road at the town limits. Gun Barrel Lane is rumored to have gotten its name during the 1920s and 1930s when Jesse Daniels frequented the area. It was considered a safe backwoods place during Prohibition when the likes of Clyde Barrow and Bonnie Parker hung out in the area. The road got its name for simply being "straight as a gun barrel" for 2 mi between US Hwy 175 and Texas Hwy 334 to the south.

Gun Barrel City was formed in the 1960s. Not long after Cedar Creek Lake (a reservoir for the Tarrant Regional Water District) completed construction, the fledgling community that sat on its banks took steps to officially become a town.

Gun Barrel City was incorporated on May 26, 1969. Since then, it has grown into a main hub and access point for visitors to Cedar Creek Lake. In addition to the high level of tourism that the community experiences (particularly during the summer boating season), Gun Barrel City and the surrounding communities have experienced a residential building boom over the past several years. This growth has largely been led by the relocation of retirees from throughout the Dallas region, building lake homes to take advantage of Gun Barrel City's lake access.

In May 2000, Gun Barrel City voters elected their 13th mayor, 21-year-old entrepreneur and newspaper publisher Randal Tye Thomas. He resigned after community outcry in May 2001 following a grand jury indictment for one count of misdemeanor perjury and in the same week being arrested by the Gun Barrel City Police Department for public intoxication. All criminal charges were eventually dismissed. Thomas and the community were featured in many local, state, and national publications and programs, including a feature story in Texas Monthly and a feature interview on the nationwide NPR program This American Life. Thomas moved to the Dallas area in 2002, and died in 2014.

In 2008, Gun Barrel City received the coveted Certified Retirement Community recognition from the Texas Department of Agriculture's Go Texan program. The community has also received recognition from the governor's office, receiving second place on two separate occasions in the governor's Community Achievement Awards.

== Geography ==
Gun Barrel City is located in northwestern Henderson County, on the eastern shore of Cedar Creek Lake, part of the Trinity River watershed. It is bordered to the north by the town of Mabank. To the west, across the lake, is the city of Seven Points. Texas State Highway 334 runs through the center of town, leading west to Seven Points and east to U.S. Route 175 between Mabank and Eustace. Texas State Highway 198 crosses Highway 334 in the eastern part of Gun Barrel City, leading north to Mabank and south 15 miles (24 km) to Malakoff. Athens, the Henderson county seat, is 18 miles (29 km) southeast of Gun Barrel City via US 175.

According to the U.S. Census Bureau, Gun Barrel City has a total area of 6.6 square miles (17.2 km^{2}), of which 0.39 square miles (1.0 km^{2}), or 5.59%, is covered by water.

== Economy ==
Nestled on the shores of Cedar Creek Lake, 55 miles (89 km) southeast of downtown Dallas, Gun Barrel City is the retail hub for a trade area of more than 75,000 people and features no town property tax.

The lake is the fourth-largest in Texas with over 220 miles (350 km) of shoreline, making it one of the most popular lakes for boating and fishing.

All of this activity swells the stated population of 5,000+ to more than 10,000 during the boating season, which now starts before Memorial Day and extends well past Labor Day.

== Demographics ==
Historical population
Census	Pop.	Note	%±
1970	327		—
1980	2,118		547.7%
1990	3,526		66.5%
2000	5,145		45.9%
2010	5,672		10.2%
2020	6,190		9.1%
U.S. Decennial Census

=== 2020 census ===
As of the 2020 census, Gun Barrel City had a population of 6,190 and a median age of 43.8 years. 21.2% of residents were under the age of 18 and 21.8% were 65 years of age or older, with 99.0 males for every 100 females overall and 94.9 males for every 100 females age 18 and over.

The 2020 census counted 2,484 households, including 1,629 families; 28.3% had children under the age of 18, 45.9% were married-couple households, 19.2% had a male householder with no spouse or partner present, and 26.0% had a female householder with no spouse or partner present. About 26.9% of all households were made up of individuals and 13.8% had someone living alone who was 65 years of age or older.

There were 3,084 housing units, of which 19.5% were vacant; the homeowner vacancy rate was 4.0% and the rental vacancy rate was 7.4%.

93.5% of residents lived in urban areas while 6.5% lived in rural areas.

Racial composition as of the 2020 census
Race	Number	Percent
White	5,346	86.4%
Black or African American	77	1.2%
American Indian and Alaska Native	47	0.8%
Asian	44	0.7%
Native Hawaiian and Other Pacific Islander	2	0.0%
Some other race	194	3.1%
Two or more races	480	7.8%
Hispanic or Latino (of any race)	615	9.9%

=== 2000 census ===
As of the census of 2000, 5,145 people, 2,163 households, and 1,498 families resided in the town. The population density was 1,000.5 people/sq mi (386.5/km^{2}). The 2,736 housing units averaged 532.0/sq mi (205.5/km^{2}). The racial makeup of the town was 94.23% White, 1.11% African American, 0.76% Native American, 0.76% Asian, 1.32% from other races, and 1.83% from two or more races. Hispanics or Latino of any race were 3.60% of the population.

Of the 2,163 households, 24.8% had children under the age of 18 living with them, 55.5% were married couples living together, 9.9% had a female householder with no husband present, and 30.7% were not families, 78 were unmarried partner households; 26.4% of all households were made up of individuals, and 13.9% had someone living alone who was 65 years of age or older. The average household size was 2.36 and the average family size was 2.82.

In the town, the population was distributed as 21.8% under 18, 7.0% from 18 to 24, 23.7% from 25 to 44, 25.0% from 45 to 64, and 22.6% who were 65 or older. The median age was 43 years. For every 100 females, there were 93.7 males. For every 100 females age 18 and over, there were 89.6 males.

The median income for a household in the town was $30,075, and for a family was $34,321. Males had a median income of $33,872 versus $21,563 for females. The per capita income for the town was $21,046. About 13.1% of families and 14.9% of the population were below the poverty line, including 21.6% of those under age 18 and 9.7% of those age 65 or over.

== Education ==
Gun Barrel City is within the Mabank Independent School District. Elementary schools include Southside Elementary, Central Elementary, and Lakeview Elementary. A new high-school campus opened in the fall of 2007. The new campus is adjacent to the old high school in Mabank. Lakeview Elementary School (Gun Barrel City), Mabank Intermediate School (Mabank), Mabank Junior High School (Mabank), and Mabank High School (Mabank) serve Gun Barrel City.

== Economic development ==
Organization

The Gun Barrel City Economic Development Corporation (EDC) is a community team made up of resident executives and business owners, responsible for attracting new investment and helping expand existing businesses within the town. With a seven-member board and one staff person, the Gun Barrel City EDC is funded by a $.0025 sales tax.

Business assistance

The Gun Barrel City EDC provides business assistance to qualifying companies. They evaluate incentives for businesses to locate or expand in the Gun Barrel City area and base their findings on taxes assessed and paid, the number of jobs created or retained, wages paid, local purchases of products and services, indirect employment gains, and the general benefit of furthering the mission of the Gun Barrel City EDC.

They primarily seek businesses in manufacturing, production, medical/health, hospitality, and distribution. Funds may be used in land lease/purchase, building lease/purchase, rehabilitation or construction, capital equipment purchase, infrastructure improvements or employee training. Funds may not be used for venture or equity capital, working capital/inventories, or personal loans. Forms of business assistance include loans/loan guarantees, SBA 504, SBA 7(A) guaranteed and direct loans, and the rural economic development fund.
