= Johan Reinert Reiersen =

Norwegian-American writer (1810–1864)

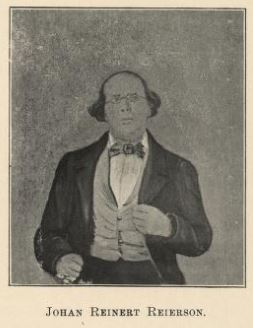

Johan Reinert Reierson (April 17, 1810, Vestre Moland, Nedenes - September 6, 1864) was a Norwegian-American writer and publisher as well as an early Texas pioneer and emigration activist.

== Immigration ==
Reierson had been sponsored in 1843 by a group of prospective emigrants and financiers to tour the United States and report settlement possibilities. He made his way to the Republic of Texas. Reierson traveled to Austin, where President Sam Houston encouraged him to bring Norwegian settlers to the republic and promised aid in the establishment of a colony.

In 1844, Reierson wrote and published a comprehensive book about America titled Pathfinder for Norwegian Emigrants to the United North American States and Texas (Norwegian: Veiviser for norske emigranter til De forenede nordamerikanske stater og Texas) a comprehensive book about America published in Norway. Reierson particularly advocated Texas as the most promising regions for settlement.

Reierson decided to immigrate to Texas and establish a Norwegian colony in the republic. With a small group of Norwegians, including his own family, he returned in the spring of 1845. Before departing for America, he established a monthly magazine, Norway and America (Norwegian: Norge og Amerika) to report on the progress of the Norwegians in America to the people of Norway. When Reierson immigrated to Texas, Elise Wærenskjold assumed the editorship of the popular magazine until she herself immigrated to Texas in 1847.

After the annexation of Texas in 1845, Reierson led his group of settlers into the state and established the first real Norwegian immigrant colony in Texas in Henderson County. The colony, originally named Normandy, merged with nearby Brownsboro. In 1850, Reierson established a second colony. Families from Brownsboro moved to these communities, which they named Four Mile Prairie in Van Zandt County and Prairieville in Kaufman County. In 1848 the Texas legislature had formed Van Zandt and Kaufman counties out of Henderson County. His pro-American letters to Norwegian newspapers continued to mark him as a controversial figure in his homeland.

== Personal life ==
Reierson married Henrietta Christine Waldt (1818–1851) on August 5, 1836 in Prairieville, Texas. The couple had six sons and two daughters. He spent the remainder of his life as a farmer and member of the Prairieville community. When he died in Prairieville, he was still writing about Texas in publications in Norway. He was buried at Four Mile Prairie Norwegian Cemetery.

== Other sources ==
- Blegen, Theodore C. Norwegian Migration to America, 1825-1860 (2 vols., 1931; 1940., New York: Haskell House, 1969)
- Unstad, Lyder L. The First Norwegian Migration into Texas (Southwestern Historical Quarterly 43. October 1939)
- Clausen, C. A., ed., The Lady with the Pen: Elise Waerenskjold in Texas (Norwegian-American Historical Association, Northfield, Minnesota. 1961)
- Russell, Charles H. Undaunted: A Norwegian Woman in Frontier Texas (Texas A&M University Press. 2005)
- Payne, Darwin Early Norwegians in Northeast Texas (Southwestern Historical Quarterly 45. October 1961)
- Van Zandt County History Book Committee, History of Van Zandt County (Dallas: National ShareGraphics; 1st edition 1984)
- Hall, Margaret Elizabeth A History of Van Zandt County (Austin: Jenkins Publishing Company. 1976)
