= Baxter, Texas =

- Unincorporated community
- Location within Texas Location within the United States
- Coordinates: 32°10′07″N 95°44′57″W
- Country: United States
- State: Texas
- County: Henderson
- Elevation: 499 ft (152 m)
- Time zone: UTC-6 (Central (CST))
  - Summer (DST): UTC-5 (CDT)
- Area codes: 430, 903
- GNIS feature ID: 1377976

Baxter is an unincorporated community in Henderson County, located in the U.S. state of Texas.
