= Eustace, Texas =

- City
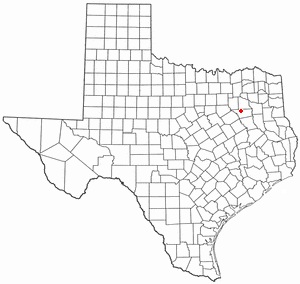
- Location of Eustace, Texas

- Coordinates: 32°18′35″N 96°00′23″W
- Country: United States
- State: Texas
- County: Henderson

Area
  - Total: 2.93 sq mi (7.58 km^{2})
  - Land: 2.93 sq mi (7.58 km^{2})
  - Water: 0 sq mi (0.00 km^{2})
- Elevation: 427 ft (130 m)

Population (2020)
  - Total: 1,137
  - Density: 388/sq mi (150/km^{2})
- Time zone: UTC-6 (Central (CST))
  - Summer (DST): UTC-5 (CDT)
- ZIP code: 75124
- Area codes: 430, 903
- FIPS code: 48-24828
- GNIS feature ID: 2410466
- Website: www.eustacetexas.org

Eustace is a city in Henderson County, Texas, United States. The population was 1,137 at the 2020 census, up from 991 at the 2010 census.

== History ==
=== Fire From Below ===
In November 2007, film crews led by actor/producer Andrew Stevens came to Eustace to film a movie called Fire from Below. The cast included Kevin Sorbo (Hercules) and Burton Gilliam (Blazing Saddles). Many Eustace locations were used, including a restaurant and gazebo on the town square, and a nearby private lake (dubbed "Lost Lake" in the film). Several Eustace residents were used as extras. According to the script, "Eustace" was retained as the name of the town setting depicted in the scenes shot in Eustace. Fire from Below was released in 2009.

=== 2017 tornado ===
On April 29, 2017, a very large and destructive EF4 tornado struck the city of Eustace causing major damage. The Big Rock Gun Club received some damage. The tornado then tore through West Canton, where more EF3/EF4 damage occurred. The tornado killed two people, and Canton was devastated only minutes later by another tornado (rated EF3) which killed another two people.

=== 2021 gas leak ===
On November 12, 2021, a gas leak that was caused by stress to a gas line started a town evacuation. The leak started in the morning, and a smell was noticed by many Eustace residents. In the afternoon, the mayor received a message saying it was a leak of a toxic gas. Many residents fled to towns nearby, such as Athens and Mabank. Later in the very early morning, the mayor declared Eustace was back to normal.

== Geography ==
Eustace is located in northwestern Henderson County. U.S. Route 175 passes through the center of town, leading southeast 11 miles (18 km) to Athens, the county seat, and northwest 7 miles (11 km) to Mabank.

According to the United States Census Bureau, Eustace has a total area of 2.9 square miles (7.6 km^{2}), all land.

== Demographics ==
Historical population
Census	Pop.	Note	%±
1960	351		—
1970	491		39.9%
1980	541		10.2%
1990	662		22.4%
2000	798		20.5%
2010	991		24.2%
2020	1,137		14.7%
U.S. Decennial Census; 2020 Census

=== 2020 census ===
As of the 2020 census, Eustace had a population of 1,137. The median age was 40.3 years. 25.2% of residents were under the age of 18 and 18.4% of residents were 65 years of age or older. For every 100 females there were 83.7 males, and for every 100 females age 18 and over there were 81.4 males age 18 and over.

0.0% of residents lived in urban areas, while 100.0% lived in rural areas.

There were 458 households in Eustace, of which 35.4% had children under the age of 18 living in them. Of all households, 39.5% were married-couple households, 16.8% were households with a male householder and no spouse or partner present, and 33.8% were households with a female householder and no spouse or partner present. About 29.9% of all households were made up of individuals and 16.3% had someone living alone who was 65 years of age or older.

There were 495 housing units, of which 7.5% were vacant. The homeowner vacancy rate was 1.6% and the rental vacancy rate was 6.6%.

Racial composition as of the 2020 census
Race	Number	Percent
White	1,003	88.2%
Black or African American	17	1.5%
American Indian and Alaska Native	4	0.4%
Asian	1	0.1%
Native Hawaiian and Other Pacific Islander	2	0.2%
Some other race	38	3.3%
Two or more races	72	6.3%
Hispanic or Latino (of any race)	88	7.7%

=== 2000 census ===
As of the 2000 census, there were 798 people, 309 households, and 204 families residing in the city. The population density was 463.9 inhabitants per square mile (179.1/km^{2}). There were 339 housing units at an average density of 197.1 units per square mile (76.1 units/km^{2}). The racial makeup of the city was 97.87% White, 0.13% Native American, 0.13% Asian, 1.38% from other races, and 0.50% from two or more races. Hispanic or Latino of any race were 5.39% of the population.

There were 309 households, out of which 36.9% had children under the age of 18 living with them, 48.5% were married couples living together, 12.0% had a female householder with no husband present, and 33.7% were non-families. 29.4% of all households were made up of individuals, and 18.1% had someone living alone who was 65 years of age or older. The average household size was 2.58 and the average family size was 3.20.

In the city, the population was spread out, with 29.8% under the age of 18, 9.1% from 18 to 24, 29.9% from 25 to 44, 15.5% from 45 to 64, and 15.5% who were 65 years of age or older. The median age was 34 years. For every 100 females, there were 90.5 males. For every 100 females age 18 and over, there were 79.5 males.

The median income for a household in the city was $40,045, and the median income for a family was $42,411. Males had a median income of $37,500 versus $21,435 for females. The per capita income for the city was $17,419. About 6.6% of families and 10.4% of the population were below the poverty line, including 11.9% of those under age 18 and 6.7% of those age 65 or over.

== Education ==
Students are zoned in the Eustace Independent School District. The Eustace High School is a modern, state-of-the-art building established in 2021 specifically for the city of Eustace, Texas. It has been declared as having the best 3A Athletic department for the Henderson/Van Zandt Area.
