= Mabank Independent School District =

School district in Texas, United States

Address
- 310 E Market St, Mabank, TX 75147 ESC Region 7 Mabank, Kaufman County, Henderson County, Van Zant County, Texas; USA

District information
- Type: Public
- Grades: Pre-K through 12
- Superintendent: Brad Koskelin (interim)

Students and staff
- Athletic conference: UIL District 8 Class 4A Division 1
- Colors: green, white, and black

Other information
- Mascot: Panthers
- Website: www.mabankisd.net

Mabank Independent School District is a public school district based in Mabank, Texas (USA).

In addition to Mabank, the district serves southeast Kaufman, southwest Van Zandt, and northwest Henderson counties, including the community of Gun Barrel City and parts of Seven Points.

The district is about 40 miles (64 km) east of Ennis.

As of 2019 Mabank ISD had 3,509 students.

== History ==
Mabank ISD has been around for over 100 years, with one picture included in a video from The Monitor showing several photos of the original high school, as well as several graduations from the early 20th century. It went from just that one school to several other schools mentioned in the "Schools" section below.

For the 2022–23 school year, the district was rated by the Texas Education Agency as follows: 83 (B) overall, 80 (B) for Student Achievement, 84 (B) for School Progress, and 80 (B) for Closing the Gaps.

Lee Joffre, previously superintendent of Italy Independent School District, began work as Mabank ISD superintendent on January 7, 2019.

== Schools ==
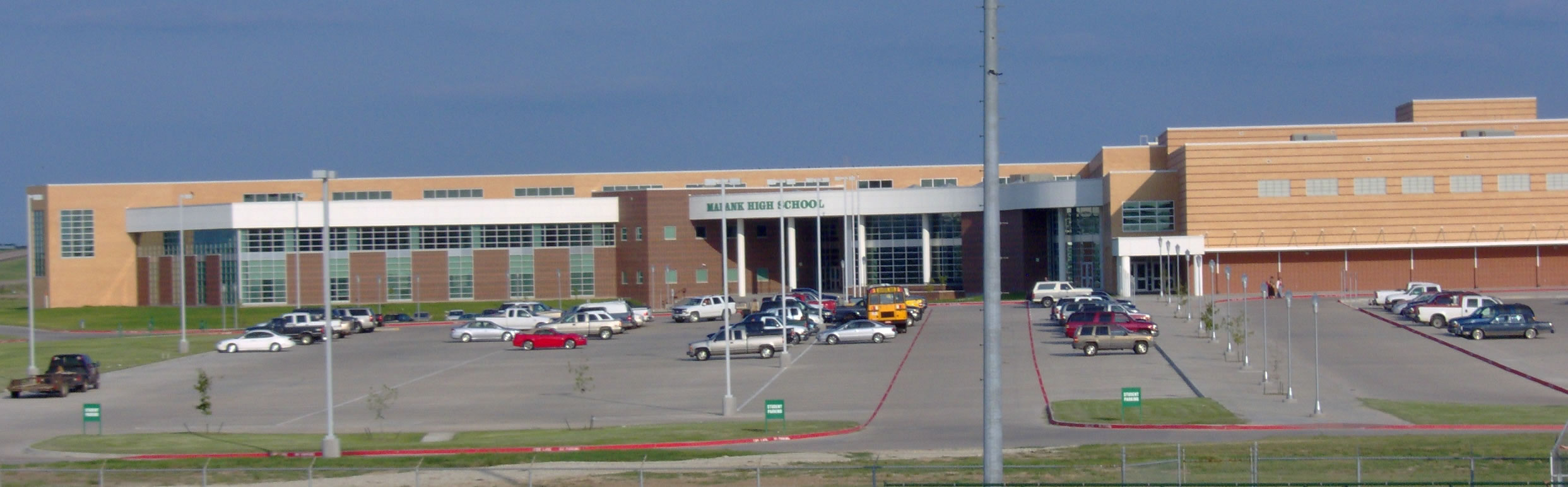
Mabank High School

Secondary schools:

- Mabank High School (grades 9–12)
- Mabank Junior High School (grades 7–8)

Primary schools:

- Mabank Intermediate School (grades 5–6)
- Central Elementary School (PK-4)
- Lakeview Elementary School (Kinder-4)
- Southside Elementary School (PK-4)
