= Seven Points, Texas =

- City
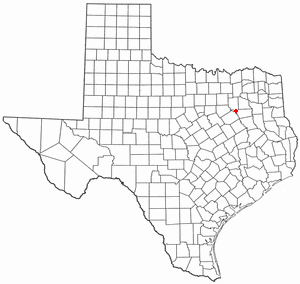
- Location of Seven Points, Texas

- Coordinates: 32°19′35″N 96°14′12″W
- Country: United States
- State: Texas
- Counties: Henderson, Kaufman

Area
  - Total: 2.76 sq mi (7.15 km^{2})
  - Land: 2.75 sq mi (7.12 km^{2})
  - Water: 0.012 sq mi (0.03 km^{2})
- Elevation: 354 ft (108 m)

Population (2020)
  - Total: 1,370
  - Density: 498/sq mi (192/km^{2})
- Time zone: UTC-6 (Central (CST))
  - Summer (DST): UTC-5 (CDT)
- ZIP code: 75143
- Area codes: 903, 430
- FIPS code: 48-66908
- GNIS feature ID: 2411870
- Website: www.sevenpointstx.com

Seven Points is a city in Henderson and Kaufman Counties in the U.S. state of Texas. Its population was 1,370 at the 2020 census, down from 1,455 at the 2010 census.

== Origin of the name ==
The city was named for an intersection where seven roads formerly converged. These were not Old West wagon trails; the town did not exist until nearby Cedar Creek Reservoir was built in the 1960s and was not incorporated until the 1970s. Historically Pritchett Lane and Veterans Lane comprised a single continuous road (with no break between Cedar Creek Pkwy and Seven Points Blvd). This arrangement formed a large triangle from which seven roads radiated outward in seven different directions. These seven points were formed by the roads now known as Seven Points Boulevard (State Highway 274 to the northwest and southeast), Cedar Creek Parkway (SH 334 to the northeast and farm-to-market road 85 to the west), Pritchett Lane (north), Veterans Lane (south), and Kelly Lane (east). In more recent years, a segment of Pritchett Lane was vacated (removing the east side of the original triangle), and the westernmost segment of Kelly Lane was also vacated, such that it no longer reaches what is now a six-point convergence.

== Geography ==
Seven Points is located in northwestern Henderson County. A small part of the city extends north along Seven Points Road (Texas State Highway 274) into Kaufman County. Highway 274 leads north 9 miles (14 km) to Kemp and southeast 14 miles (23 km) to Trinidad. Texas State Highway 334 (East Cedar Creek Parkway) leads east from Seven Points across Cedar Creek Reservoir 4 miles (6 km) to Gun Barrel City. Athens, the Henderson county seat, is 24 miles (39 km) southeast of Seven Points.

According to the United States Census Bureau, the city has a total area of 2.8 square miles (7.2 km^{2}), of which 0.01 sq mi (0.03 km^{2}), or 0.42%, is covered by water.

== Demographics ==
Historical population
Census	Pop.	Note	%±
1970	186		—
1980	647		247.8%
1990	723		11.7%
2000	1,145		58.4%
2010	1,455		27.1%
2020	1,370		−5.8%
U.S. Decennial Census

=== 2020 census ===
As of the 2020 census, Seven Points had a population of 1,370 people living in 563 households, including 384 families. The median age was 46.2 years; 20.3% of residents were under 18 and 21.2% were 65 or older. For every 100 females, there were 103.9 males, and for every 100 females18 and over, there were 97.8 males 18 and over.

About 61.0% of the residents lived in urban areas, while 39.0% lived in rural areas.

Of the 563 households, 28.6% had children under 18 living in them, 38.0% were married-couple households, 24.9% were households with a male householder and no spouse or partner present, and 27.5% were households with a female householder and no spouse or partner present. About 31.7% of all households were made up of individuals, and 14.8% had someone living alone who was 65 or older.

The city had 653 housing units, of which 13.8% were vacant. The homeowner vacancy rate was 3.6% and the rental vacancy rate was 6.4%.

Racial composition as of the 2020 census
Race	Number	Percentage
White	1,140	83.2%
Black or African American	10	0.7%
American Indian and Alaska Native	8	0.6%
Asian	2	0.1%
Native Hawaiian and other Pacific Islander	0	0.0%
Some other race	95	6.9%
Two or more races	115	8.4%
Hispanic or Latino (of any race)	207	15.1%

== Education ==
The Kemp Independent School District serves most of Seven Points, although portions of the city lie within the Mabank Independent School District.

== Revenue through traffic citations ==
In the fiscal year September 1, 2010, to August 31, 2011, Seven Points raised $521,995 from traffic citations, 43% more than Gun Barrel City in fines, although Gun Barrel City has 75% more people.

Below is a chart with a four-year history of fines collected by Seven Points and three surrounding cities:

City	Population	2008	2009	2010	2011
Seven Points	1,455	$168,411	$265,215	$387,000	$521,995
Gun Barrel City	5,672	$502,595	$384,586	$364,703	$298,633
Ennis	18,513	$702,949	$807,642	$830,008	$636,938
Kaufman	6,703	$259,406	$298,217	$322,656	$307,800
