= Mabank, Texas =

Town in Kaufman and Henderson counties in Texas, United States

- Town
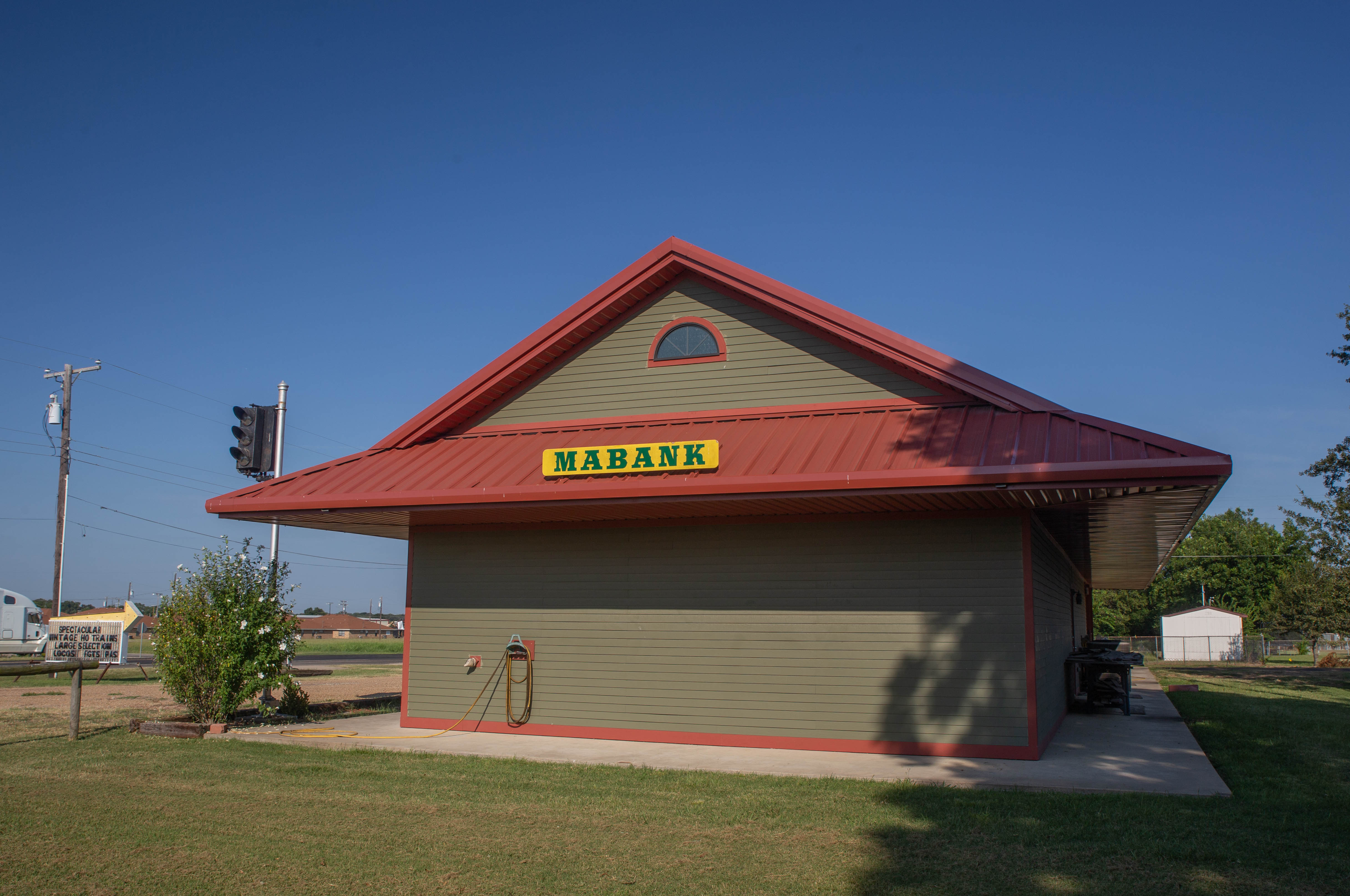
- Train depot, July 2019

- Location of Mabank in Kaufman County, Texas
- Coordinates: 32°22′45″N 96°06′50″W
- Country: United States
- State: Texas
- Counties: Kaufman, Henderson

Area
  - Total: 7.63 sq mi (19.77 km^{2})
  - Land: 7.56 sq mi (19.59 km^{2})
  - Water: 0.073 sq mi (0.19 km^{2})
- Elevation: 371 ft (113 m)

Population (2024)
  - Total: 4,050
  - Density: 535/sq mi (207/km^{2})
- Time zone: UTC-6 (Central (CST))
  - Summer (DST): UTC-5 (CDT)
- ZIP code: 75147
- Area codes: 430, 903
- FIPS code: 48-45324
- GNIS feature ID: 2412931
- Website: www.cityofmabanktx.org

Mabank (/ˈmeɪbæŋk/ MAY-bank) is a town in Henderson and Kaufman counties in Texas, United States. Its population was 4,050 at the 2020 census.

== History ==
Prior to the existence of Mabank in early 1900, the community of Lawndale was formed in the late 1880s. The community was noted for its agriculture in many areas, including cotton. With the Texas Trunk Railroad missing the community by a mile, though, ranchers Mason and Eubank decided to capitalize on the Texas Trunk and set aside one square mile of land and named it "Mabank".

Mabank is a combination of the names Eubank and Mason, and is located one mile (1.6 km) southwest of the former community of Lawndale. Being only a mile away from Lawndale and located on the railroad, its citizens, churches, and businesses naturally decided to move there, thus attracting, over a brief period of about two years, much of what was Lawndale. This included the Lawndale Courier—the local newspaper that renamed itself the Mabank Courier.

The population, although small, remained relatively stable until the completion of Cedar Creek Reservoir in 1965. The town has since shown increases in population. Many of the descendants from the Masons and Eubanks still have connections to the town.

== Geography ==
Mabank is located in the southeastern corner of Kaufman County. The town limits extend south into Henderson County. U.S. Route 175 runs through the northern side of the town, leading northwest 21 miles (34 km) to Kaufman and southeast 18 miles (29 km) to Athens. Downtown Dallas is 54 miles (87 km) northwest of Mabank.

According to the United States Census Bureau, the town has a total area of 7.2 square miles (18.7 km^{2}), of which 0.04 square miles (0.1 km^{2}), or 0.45%, is covered by water.

== Demographics ==
Historical population
Census	Pop.	Note	%±
1930	963		—
1940	988		2.6%
1950	896		−9.3%
1960	944		5.4%
1970	1,239		31.3%
1980	1,443		16.5%
1990	1,739		20.5%
2000	2,151		23.7%
2010	3,035		41.1%
2020	4,050		33.4%
2023 (est.)	6,396	▲	57.9%
U.S. Decennial Census; 2010 2020

=== 2020 census ===
As of the 2020 census, Mabank had a population of 4,050. The median age was 36.0 years. 26.1% of residents were under the age of 18 and 17.8% of residents were 65 years of age or older. For every 100 females there were 85.2 males, and for every 100 females age 18 and over there were 80.0 males age 18 and over.

Mabank racial composition as of 2020 (NH = Non-Hispanic) (Note: Note: the US Census treats Hispanic/Latino as an ethnic category. This table excludes Latinos from the racial categories and assigns them to a separate category. Hispanics/Latinos can be of any race.)
Race	Number	Percentage
White (NH)	3,209	79.23%
Black or African American (NH)	118	2.91%
Native American or Alaska Native (NH)	29	0.72%
Asian (NH)	92	2.27%
Pacific Islander (NH)	1	0.02%
Some Other Race (NH)	11	0.27%
Mixed/Multi-Racial (NH)	151	3.73%
Hispanic or Latino	439	10.84%
Total	4,050	

83.4% of residents lived in urban areas, while 16.6% lived in rural areas.

There were 1,577 households in Mabank, including 720 families. Of all households, 35.6% had children under the age of 18 living in them, 43.4% were married-couple households, 15.2% were households with a male householder and no spouse or partner present, and 33.9% were households with a female householder and no spouse or partner present. About 30.2% of all households were made up of individuals, and 17.1% had someone living alone who was 65 years of age or older.

There were 1,729 housing units, of which 8.8% were vacant. The homeowner vacancy rate was 1.3% and the rental vacancy rate was 6.7%.

== Education ==
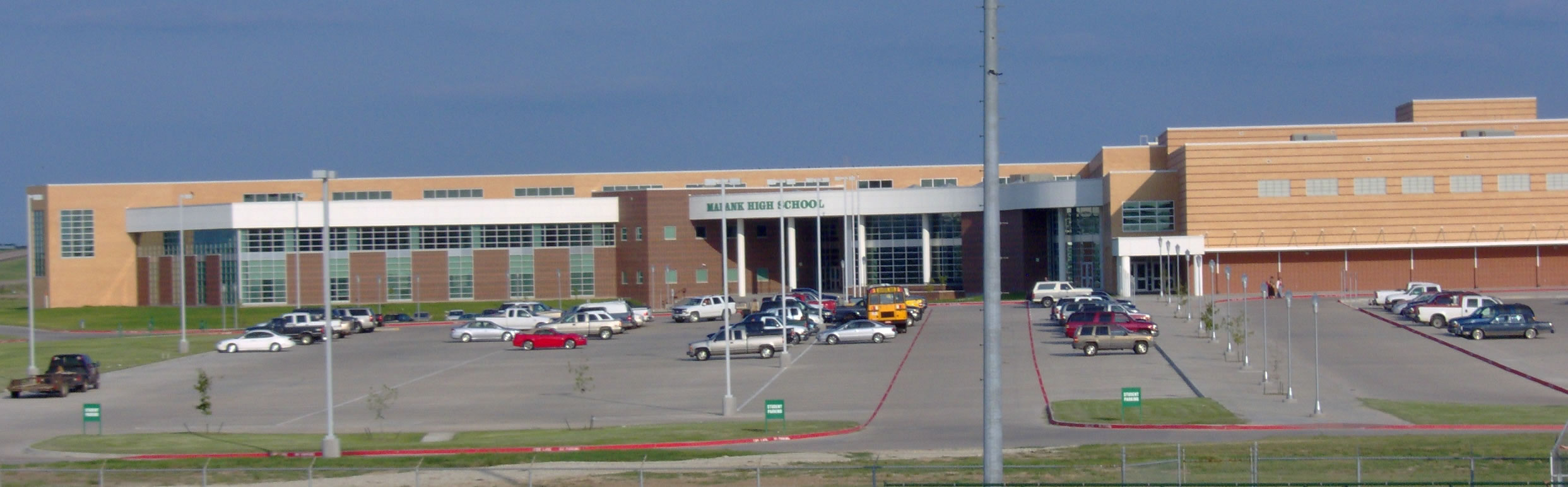
Mabank High School

Mabank is served by the Mabank Independent School District. The schools are Central Elementary, Southside Elementary, Lakeview Elementary, Mabank Intermediate [School, Mabank Jr]. High, and Mabank High School.

== Parks and recreation ==
Mabank is located on the northern and eastern edge of Cedar Creek Reservoir, a popular destination for weekend visitors from the Dallas-Fort Worth Metroplex.

== Notable people ==
- Lindley Beckworth, former U.S. Congressman and judge
- Isiah Robertson, former NFL player who started the " House of Isaiah", a drug treatment program in Mabank
- Randal Tye Thomas, 13th mayor of Gun Barrel City, Texas, (at the age of 21), from 2000 to 2001

== See also ==
- List of municipalities in Texas
