= 2021 Kansas Jayhawks football team =

American college football season

2021 Kansas Jayhawks football
- Conference: Big 12 Conference
- Record: 2–10 (1–8 Big 12)
- Head coach: Lance Leipold (1st season)
- Offensive coordinator: Andy Kotelnicki (1st season)
- Offensive scheme: Spread option
- Defensive coordinator: Brian Borland (1st season)
- Base defense: 4–3
- Home stadium: David Booth Kansas Memorial Stadium

Uniform
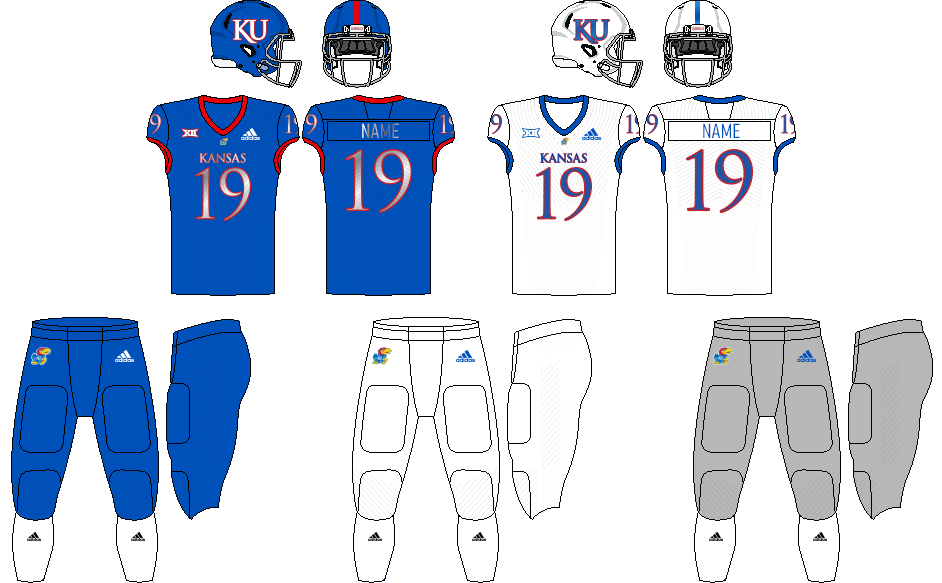

2021 Big 12 Conference football standings
	Conf.			Overall
Team	W		L	W		L
No. 7 Oklahoma State y	8	–	1	12	–	2
No. 5 Baylor y$	7	–	2	12	–	2
No. 10 Oklahoma	7	–	2	11	–	2
Iowa State	5	–	4	7	–	6
Kansas State	4	–	5	8	–	5
West Virginia	4	–	5	6	–	7
Texas	3	–	6	5	–	7
TCU	3	–	6	5	–	7
Texas Tech	3	–	6	7	–	6
Kansas	1	–	8	2	–	10
Championship: Baylor 21, Oklahoma State 16
$ – Conference champion; y – Championship game participant; Rankings from AP Poll

The 2021 Kansas Jayhawks football team represented the University of Kansas in the 2021 NCAA Division I FBS football season. It was the Jayhawks 132nd season. They were members of the Big 12 Conference. They played their home games at David Booth Kansas Memorial Stadium. They were coached by Lance Leipold in his first year as head coach.

The Jayhawks entered the season with multiple losing streaks: 41 games to AP ranked teams, 54 road conference games, twelve conference games, and an overall losing streak of thirteen. Only one of the streaks would still be standing by the end of the season. They would end their thirteen game overall losing streak with their victory over South Dakota on September 3, 2021. Their victory over Texas on November 13 ended several more losing streaks: 8 straight overall losses, 18 straight within the Big 12, 20 straight to FBS opponents, and 56 straight in road conference games. They lost all their games against AP poll ranked teams during the season extending the streak to 44 games. The Jayhawks also failed to qualify for a bowl game for the 13th consecutive season, dating back to the 2008 season. They finished last in the Big 12 for the 7th consecutive season.

== Les Miles departure ==
On March 5, 2021, head coach Les Miles, was placed on administrative leave following allegations of inappropriate comments and actions with female students while the head coach at LSU. Kansas and Miles agreed to mutually part ways on March 8, 2021. Wide receivers coach Emmett Jones served as interim coach from March 11 through the team's spring practices at the end of April. On April 30, Lance Leipold was hired as the head coach.

== Offseason ==
=== Starters lost ===
Overall, the Jayhawks had 17 players run out of eligibility. Below are the starters from 2020 who have run out of eligibility.

Name	Position
Elijah Jones	CB
Logan Klusman	LS

=== Coaching staff changes ===
Including new head coach Lance Leipold, the Jayhawks will have five new coaches on their coaching staff replacing five coaches, which includes filling one position that was officially vacant the previous season.

Name	Position	Replacement
Brent Dearmon	Offensive coordinator	Andy Kotelnicki
Joshua Eargle	Tight ends	Andy Kotelnicki
John Morookian	Offensive line	Scott Fuchs
Chidera Uzo-Diribe	Linebackers	Chris Sampson
Vacant	Special teams coordinator	Jake Schoonover

=== Recruiting ===
The Jayhawks have 22 commitments for their 2021 recruiting class. Below is the breakdown. The only positions KU did not have any recruits for were kicker and punter.

==== Overall class ranking ====
Website	Overall rank	Conference rank	4 star recruits	3 star recruits
Rivals	45	5	1*	21
247 Sports	63	9	0	20

*Rivals still incorrectly lists four-star recruit Quaydarius Davis as being committed to Kansas despite Kansas withdrawing their scholarship offer after he was accused of domestic violence.

==== Positional breakdown ====
Position	Number
WR	3
RB	1
TE	1
QB	2
OL	3
LB	2
DL	3
DB	5
ATH	2

All information above is as of February 2, 2021

=== Transfers ===
Only notable transfers are listed below. Kansas had 27 players transfer out and 13 transfer in.

==== Incoming ====
Player	Position	Old school
Colin Grunhard	C	Notre Dame
Kevin Terry	WR	Texas Tech
Jason Bean	QB	North Texas
Mike Novitsky	C	Buffalo
Jeremy Webb	CB	Missouri State

==== Outgoing ====
Player	Position	New school
Andrew Parchment	WR	Florida State
Kyle Thompson	P	N/A*
Karon Prunty	CB	North Carolina A&T
Marcus Harris	DT	Auburn

*Thompson announced his entry into the transfer portal, but never committed to a new school

=== Entered NFL draft ===
Player	Position
Pooka Williams Jr.	RB

=== Left during season ===
Player	Position
Velton Gardner	RB

== Big 12 media poll ==
The 2021 media poll was released on July 8, 2021. The Jayhawks were picked last for the 11th consecutive season receiving all 39 potential last place votes.

Big 12 media poll
Predicted finish	Team	Votes (1st place)
1	Oklahoma	386 (35)
2	Iowa State	351 (4)
3	Texas	273
4	Oklahoma State	266
5	TCU	255
6	West Virginia	185
7	Kansas State	163
8	Baylor	124
9	Texas Tech	103
10	Kansas	39

== Schedule ==
Date	Time	Opponent	Site	TV	Result	Attendance
September 3	7:00 pm	South Dakota*	David Booth Kansas Memorial Stadium; Lawrence, KS	ESPN+	W 17–14	26,103
September 10	6:30 pm	at No. 17 Coastal Carolina*	Brooks Stadium; Conway, SC	ESPN2	L 22–49	17,697
September 18	2:30 pm	Baylor	David Booth Kansas Memorial Stadium; Lawrence, KS	ESPN+	L 7–45	27,218
September 25	3:00 pm	at Duke*	Wallace Wade Stadium; Durham, NC	ACCN	L 33–52	19,128
October 2	6:00 pm	at Iowa State	Jack Trice Stadium; Ames, IA	FS1	L 7–59	60,446
October 16	3:00 pm	Texas Tech^{†}	David Booth Kansas Memorial Stadium; Lawrence, KS	ESPN+	L 14–41	25,106
October 23	11:00 am	No. 3 Oklahoma	David Booth Kansas Memorial Stadium; Lawrence, KS	ESPN	L 23–35	26,321
October 30	6:00 pm	at No. 15 Oklahoma State	Boone Pickens Stadium; Stillwater, OK	FS1	L 3–55	55,026
November 6	11:00 am	Kansas State	David Booth Kansas Memorial Stadium; Lawrence, KS (Sunflower Showdown)	FS1	L 10–35	30,611
November 13	6:30 pm	at Texas	Darrell K Royal–Texas Memorial Stadium; Austin, TX	ESPNU	W 57–56 ^{OT}	95,202
November 20	3:00 pm	at TCU	Amon G. Carter Stadium; Fort Worth, TX	ESPN+	L 28–31	35,061
November 27	6:00 pm	West Virginia	David Booth Kansas Memorial Stadium; Lawrence, KS	FS1	L 28–34	23,117
*Non-conference game; ^{†}Homecoming; Rankings from AP Poll and CFP Rankings (after November 24) released prior to game; All times are in Central time

== Roster ==
2021 Kansas Jayhawks Football
Quarterback: 3 Miles Kendrick (redshirt) Senior; 6 Jalon Daniels Sophomore; 9 Conrad Hawley Freshman; 13 Jordan Preston (redshirt) Sophomore; 15 Miles Fallin Senior; 16 Ben Easters Freshman; 17 Jason Bean (redshirt) Junior; Running back: 4 Devin Neal Freshman; 20 Daniel Hishaw Jr. Sophomore; 22 Rob Fiorentino Junior; 23 Amauri Pesek-Hickson (redshirt) Freshman; 24 Malik Johnson (redshirt) Freshman; 25 Gayflor Flomo Senior; 26 Jack Codwell Sophomore; 29 Ben Miles FB (redshirt) Senior; 33 Spencer Roe FB (redshirt) Junior; 36 DeAndre Thomas Jr. Freshman; 47 Jared Casey FB Sophomore; Wide receiver: 2 Lawrence Arnold Junior; 5 Majik Rector Freshman; 7 Trevor Wilson (redshirt) Freshman; 8 Kwamie Lassiter II Super Senior; 10 Tristan Golightly Sophomore; 11 Luke Grimm Sophomore; 12 Terry Locklin (redshirt) Sophomore; 14 Jordan Medley (redshirt) Freshman; 18 Jordan Brown (redshirt) Freshman; 19 Steven McBride Sophomore; 27 Kyler Pearson (redshirt) Freshman; 81 Taneka Scott Freshman; 83 Quentin Skinner (redshirt) Freshman; 84 Kevin Terry Junior; 85 Kelan Robinson Freshman; 88 Jamahl Horne Junior; Tight end: 45 Trevor Kardell (redshirt) Freshman; 49 Mack Moeller Freshman; 82 Mason Brotherton Freshman; 86 Mac Copeland (redshirt) Junior; 87 Will Huggins (redshirt) Freshman; 89 Mason Fairchild Junior	Offensive line: 50 Mike Novitsky (redshirt) Junior; 54 Michael Ford Jr. (redshirt) Freshman; 55 Ar'maj Reed-Adams Sophomore; 57 Hank Kelly Freshman; 58 Larson Workman Freshman; 61 Malik Clark Super Senior; 63 Jake Eisenhauer Freshman; 64 Colin Grunhard (redshirt) Junior; 66 Danny Robinson Sophomore; 67 Corey Robinson II Freshman; 68 Earl Bostick Jr. (redshirt) Senior; 69 Joe Krause (redshirt) Sophomore; 70 Nick Williams (redshirt) Junior; 72 Adagio Lopeti Super Senior; 73 Jack Werner (redshirt) Sophomore; 74 De'Kendrick Sterns Freshman; 75 Jackson Satterwhite (redshirt) Freshman; 76 Chris Hughes Super Senior; 77 Bryce Cabeldue (redshirt) Freshman; 78 Nicholas Martinez (redshirt) Freshman; 79 Joseph Gilbertson Senior; Defensive ends: 14 Steven Parker (redshirt) Sophomore; 15 Kyron Johnson Super Senior; 35 Zion DeBose (redshirt) Senior; 37 Hayden Hatcher Senior; 46 D'Marion Hatcher Freshman; 94 Kevin Orange Jr. (redshirt) Sophomore; 96 Cole Petrus Freshman; Defensive line: 11 Eddie Wilson Senior; 52 D. J. Withers Freshman; 53 Caleb Taylor (redshirt) Freshman; 90 Jereme Robinson Sophomore; 91 Jelani Arnold Senior; 92 Tommy Dunn Jr. Freshman; 93 Sam Burt Super Senior; 95 Ronald McGee Senior; 97 Kenean Caldwell Sophomore; 98 Caleb Sampson Senior; 99 Malcolm Lee Senior	Linebackers: 0 Nate Betts Super Senior; 6 Taiwan Berryhill Sophomore; 7 Takulve Williams (redshirt) Senior; 19 Gavin Potter Junior; 20 Donovan Gaines (redshirt) Freshman; 23 Alonso Person (redshirt) Freshman; 30 Rich Miller Junior; 32 Dylan Downing (redshirt) Sophomore; 38 James Wright Freshman; 39 Cole Mondi Freshman; 41 Nick Channel (redshirt) Junior; 43 Jay Dineen (redshirt) Senior; 49 Krishawn Brown (redshirt) Freshman; Defensive back: 1 Kenny Logan Jr. CB Junior; 2 Jacobee Bryant CB Freshman; 3 Ricky Thomas S Super Senior; 4 Johnquai Lewis S (redshirt) Freshman; 5 O. J. Burroughs S Freshman; 9 Jeremy Webb CB Super Senior; 10 Jayson Guillom S Freshman; 13 Ra'Mello Dotson CB Sophomore; 16 Cam'ron Dabney CB Freshman; 17 DeVonte Wilson CB Freshman; 18 Edwin White-Schultz S Freshman; 20 Donovan Gaines CB (redshirt) Freshman; 22 Duece Mayberry CB Sophomore; 26 Cody McNerney S Junior; 28 Kwinton Lassiter CB Junior; 29 Jaden Robinson CB Freshman; 31 Landon Nelson S Freshman; Special teams: 24 Reis Vernon P Sophomore; 34 Owen Piepergerdes K Freshman; 37 Grayson Addison P Freshman; 51 Emory Duggar LS (redshirt) Freshman; 60 Luke Hosford LS (redshirt) Sophomore; 80 Tabor Allen K Sophomore; 83 Jacob Borcila K (redshirt) Sophomore; Roster updated: November 2, 2021

== Coaching staff ==
Name	Position
Lance Leipold	Head coach
Andy Kotelnicki	Offensive coordinator/tight ends
Brian Borland	Defensive coordinator/safeties
Jake Schoonover	Special teams coordinator
Emmett Jones	Wide receivers
Jim Zebrowski	Quarterbacks
Jonathan Wallace	Running backs
Jordan Peterson	Cornerbacks
Taiwo Onatolu	Defensive line
Scott Fuchs	Offensive line
Travis Partridge	Offensive quality control
Chris Sampson	Linebackers

== Game summaries ==
=== Vs. South Dakota ===
South Dakota Coyotes vs. Kansas Jayhawks

Quarter	1	2	3	4	Total
South Dakota	0	0	7	7	14
Kansas	0	7	3	7	17

at David Booth Kansas Memorial Stadium • Lawrence, KS

- Date: Friday, September 3, 2021
- Game time: 7:00 p.m. CDT
- Game weather: sunny • Temperature: 80 °F (27 °C)
- Game attendance: 26,103
- Referee: Derek Anderson
- TV announcers (ESPN+): Mark Neely, Barrett Brooks

Game information

Second Quarter

- (0:24) KU – Lawrence Arnold 8-yard pass from Jason Bean, Jacob Borcila kick good (Drive: 7 plays, 37 yards, 3:18; KU 7–0)

Third Quarter

- (6:57) KU – Jacob Borcila 30 yard field goal (Drive: 13 plays, 50 yards, 6:10; KU 10–0)
- (3:31) SD – Shomari Lawrence 29 yard rush, Mason Lorber kick good (Drive: 9 plays, 75 yards, 3:23, KU 10–7)

Fourth Quarter

- (5:13) SD – Travis Theis 25 yard rush, Mason Lorber kick good (Drive: 3 plays, 46 yards, 1:01; SD 14–10)
- (1:10) KU – Lawrence Arnold 16 yard pass from Jason Bean, Jacob Borcila kick good (Drive: 11 plays, 64 yards, 3:56; KU 17–14)

Statistics	SDU	KU
First downs	14	12
Total yards	262	245
Rush yards	164	82
Passing yards	98	163
Turnovers	0	0
Time of possession	25:52	34:08

Team	Category	Player	Statistics
South Dakota	Passing	Carson Camp	10/22, 98 yards
South Dakota	Rushing	Travis Theis	18 carries, 96 yards
South Dakota	Receiving	Kody Case	2 receptions, 37 yards
Kansas	Passing	Jason Bean	17/26, 163 yards, 2 TD
Kansas	Rushing	Jason Bean	15 carries, 54 yards
Kansas	Receiving	Mason Fairchild	4 receptions, 58 yards

In the first game of the Lance Leipold era, the Jayhawks played South Dakota. The Jayhawks would score a touchdown first in the second quarter with a 8-yard pass by Jason Bean, a transfer from North Texas. After halftime, Kansas would take a 10–0 lead after a 30-yard field goal by Jacob Borcila. South Dakota would score two touchdowns to take their first lead with 5 minutes and 13 seconds left in the game. Kansas would then answer that touchdown with their own touchdown after Bean's second passing touchdown of the game with 1 minute and 3 seconds left. South Dakota would turn the ball over on downs after the kickoff to give the Jayhawks their first win since October 26, 2019, breaking a 13-game losing streak.

=== At No. 17 Coastal Carolina ===
Kansas Jayhawks vs. No. 17 Coastal Carolina Chanticleers

Quarter	1	2	3	4	Total
Kansas	9	6	7	0	22
No. 17 Coastal Carolina	7	21	7	14	49

at Brooks Stadium • Conway, SC

- Date: Friday, September 10, 2021
- Game time: 6:30 p.m. CDT
- Game weather: Sunny • Temperature: 77 °F (25 °C)
- Game attendance: 17,697
- Referee: Kevin Hassell
- TV announcers (ESPN2): Jason Benetti, Andre Ware

Game information

First quarter

- (10:07) KU – Jacob Borcila 46-yard field goal (Drive: 8 plays 36 yards, 04:45; KU 3–0)
- (8:13) CCU – Jaivon Heiligh 33 yard pass from Grayson McCall, Massimo Biscardi kick good (Drive: 5 plays 75 yards, 01:54; 7–3 CCU)
- (1:40) KU – Devin Neal 2 yard run, Jacob Borcila kick blocked (Drive: 11 plays 66 yards, 06:25; KU 9–7)

Second quarter

- (11:02) CCU – Grayson McCall 2 yard run, Massimo Biscardi kick good (Drive: 12 plays 75 yards, 05:38; CCU 14–9)
- (8:23) CCU – Alex Spillum 0 yard return of blocked punt, Massimo Biscardi kick good (CCU 21–9)
- (2:36) CCU – Reese White 2 yard run, Massimo Biscardi kick good (Drive: 4 plays 35 yards, 01:48, CCU 28–9)
- (1:36) KU – Jason Bean 34 yard run, Luke Grimm pass from Jason Bean failed (Drive: 3 plays 65 yards, 01:00; CCU 28–15)

Third quarter

- (11:36) KU – Jason Bean 46 yard run, Jacob Borcila kick good (Drive: 3 plays 65 yards, 01:16; 28–22 CCU)
- (8:37) CCU – Reese White 19 yard run, Massimo Biscardi kick good (Drive: 7 plays 75 yards, 02:59; 35–22 CCU

Fourth quarter

- (14:11) CCU – Reese White 3 yard run, Massimo Biscardi kick good (Drive: 12 plays 72 yards, 05:13; 42–22 CCU)
- (4:49) CCU – Kameron Brown 11 yard pass from Grayson McCall, Massimo Biscardi kick good (Drive: 10 plays 83 yards, 06:32; 49–22 CCU)

Statistics	KU	CCU
First downs	16	27
Total yards	412	460
Rush yards	174	215
Passing yards	238	245
Turnovers	0	1
Time of possession	30:49	29:11

Team	Category	Player	Statistics
Kansas	Passing	Jason Bean	12/24 189 yards
Kansas	Rushing	Jason Bean	13 carries 102 yards 2 TD
Kansas	Receiving	Kwamie Lassiter II	7 receptions 85 yards
Coastal Carolina	Passing	Grayson McCall	17/21 245 yards 2 TD
Coastal Carolina	Rushing	Reese White	14 carries 102 yards 3 TD
Coastal Carolina	Receiving	Jaivon Heiligh	6 receptions 122 yards 1 TD

Kansas would strike first kicking with a 46-yard field goal in their first road game of the season. Coastal Carolina would respond with a touchdown on the following drive to take the lead, only for the Jayhawks to take the lead back 9–7. They would not hold a lead for the rest of the game as Coastal Carolina would outscore the Jayhawks 42–13 the rest of the game. The loss extended the Jayhawks losing streak to teams ranked in the AP poll to 42 games.

=== vs Baylor ===
Baylor Bears vs. Kansas Jayhawks

Quarter	1	2	3	4	Total
Baylor	7	7	14	17	45
Kansas	0	7	0	0	7

at David Booth Kansas Memorial Stadium • Lawrence, KS

- Date: Saturday, September 18, 2021
- Game time: 2:30 p.m. CDT
- Game weather: Sunny • Temperature: 88 °F (31 °C)
- Game attendance: 27,218
- Referee: Michael Vandervelde
- TV announcers (ESPN+): Courtney Lyle, Ryan Leaf

Game information

First quarter

- (10:29) BU – Ben Sims 14-yard pass from Gerry Bohanon, Isaiah Hankins kick good (Drive: 9 plays 75 yards, 4:31; 7–0 BU)

Second quarter

- (13:47) BU – Gavin Yates 2 yard run, Isaiah Hankins kick good (Drive: 4 plays 39 yards, 1:36; 14–0 BU)
- (1:02) KU – Trevor Wilson 5 yard pass from Jason Bean, Jacob Borcila kick good (Drive: 11 plays 76 yards, 5:23; 14–7 BU)

Third quarter

- (12:48) BU – R.J. Sneed 69 yard pass from Gerry Bohanon, Isaiah Hankins kick good (Drive: 1 play 69 yards, 0:16; 21–7 BU)
- (9:09) BU – Abram Smith 4 yard run, Isaiah Hankins kick good (Drive: 8 plays 60 yards, 3:13; 28–7 BU)

Fourth quarter

- (13:40) BU – Gerry Bohanon 9 yard run, Isaiah Hankins kick good (Drive: 6 plays 57 yards, 2:22; 35–7 BU)
- (7:10) BU – Taye McWilliams 20 yard run, Isaiah Hankins kick good (Drive: 9 plays 81 yards, 4:58; 42–7 BU)
- (3:36) BU – Isaiah Hankins 48 yard field goal (Drive: 4 plays 8 yards, 1:30; 45–7 BU)

Statistics	BU	KU
First downs	29	8
Total yards	576	166
Rush yards	307	109
Passing yards	269	57
Turnovers	2	1
Time of possession	33:22	26:38

Team	Category	Player	Statistics
Baylor	Passing	Gerry Bohanon	19/23, 269 yards, 2 TD
Baylor	Rushing	Abram Smith	16 carries, 122 yards, 1 TD
Baylor	Receiving	R.J. Sneed	6 receptions, 128 yards, 1 TD
Kansas	Passing	Jason Bean	8/17, 57 yards, 1 TD
Kansas	Rushing	Jason Bean	12 carries, 62 yards
Kansas	Receiving	Luke Grimm	2 receptions, 25 yards

In the Jayhawks Big 12 opener, they struggled to keep up with Baylor being outgained by Baylor 576–166. Jason Bean also had his fewest passing yards of the season to that point in the game with only 57, but was still the Jayhawks leading rusher. The Jayhawks lost the game after never leading at any point 7–45. The loss was the Jayhawks' 15th consecutive loss to FBS opponents and their 13th consecutive loss in the Big 12.

=== At Duke ===
Kansas Jayhawks vs. Duke Blue Devils

Quarter	1	2	3	4	Total
Kansas	3	21	3	6	33
Duke	7	14	21	10	52

at Wallace Wade Stadium • Durham, NC

- Date: Saturday, September 25, 2021
- Game time: 3:00 p.m. CDT
- Game weather: Sunny • Temperature: 70 °F (21 °C)
- Game attendance: 19,128
- Referee: Kevin Mar
- TV announcers (ACCN): Chris Cotter, Mark Herzlich

Game information

First quarter

- (7:39) DUK – Mataeo Durant 57-yard run, Charlie Ham kick good (Drive: 6 plays 80 yards, 2:00; DUK 7–0)
- (1:05) KU – Jacob Borcila 50 yard field good (Drive: 5 plays 36 yards 2:30; DUK 7–3)

Second quarter

- (14:53) KU – Jason Bean 20 yard pass to Torry Locklin, Jacob Borcila kick good (Drive: 3 plays 18 yards, 1:07; KU 10–7)
- (11:15) DUK – Gunnar Holmberg 4 yard run, Charlie Ham kick good (Drive: 10 plays 75 yards, 3:38; DUK 14–10)
- (9:20) KU – Torry Locklin 36 yard run, Jacob Borcila kick good (Drive: 5 plays 75 yards, 1:55; KU 17–14)
- (6:24) DUK – Gunnar Holmberg pass 26 yards to Jalon Calhoun, Charlie Ham kick good (Drive: 3 plays 64 yards, 0:53; DUK 21–17)
- (1:04) KU – Devin Neal 1 yard run, Jacob Borcila kick good (Drive: 10 plays 75 yards, 5:20; KU 24–21)

Third quarter

- (12:48) KU – Jacob Borcila 29 yard field goal good (Drive: 5 plays 64 yards, 2:08; KU 27–21)
- (10:29) DUK – Jordan Waters 4 yard run, Charlie Ham kick good (Drive: 7 plays 75 yards, 2:19; DUK 28–27)
- (6:37) DUK – Gunnar Holmberg 1 yard run, Charlie Ham kick good (Drive: 5 plays 67 yards, 1:51; DUK 35–27)
- (4:38) DUK – Gunnar Holmberg 3 yard run, Charlie Ham kick good (Drive: 2 plays 8 yards, 0:31; DUK 42–27)

Fourth quarter

- (11:13) DUK – Charlie Ham 30 yard field goal (Drive: 13 plays 44 yards, 5:23; DUK 45–27)
- (8:42) KU – Jason Bean 61 yard pass to Kwamie Lassiter II, Two-point Conversion failed (Drive: 5 plays 75 yards, 2:31; DUK 45–33)
- (5:23) DUK – Gunnar Holmberg 13 yard run, Charlie Ham kick good (Drive: 8 plays 75 yards, 3:19; DUK 52–33)

Statistics	KU	DUK
First downs	21	27
Total yards	530	607
Rush yards	207	279
Passing yards	323	328
Turnovers	2	2
Time of possession	30:43	29:17

Team	Category	Player	Statistics
Kansas	Passing	Jason Bean	19/32, 323 yards, 2 TD, 2 INT
Kansas	Rushing	Devin Neal	17 carries, 107 yards, 1 TD
Kansas	Receiving	Kwamie Lassiter II	4 receptions, 99 yards, 1 TD
Duke	Passing	Gunnar Holmberg	22/29, 328 yards, 1 TD, 1 INT
Duke	Rushing	Mataeo Durant	21 carries, 124 yards, 1 TD
Duke	Receiving	Jake Bobo	7 receptions, 105 yards

The first half featured a back and forth game. The entire second quarter, the teams traded touchdowns. The Jayhawks went into halftime with a 24–21 lead. Duke would begin to pull away in the second half, however. The Blue Devils finished the game on a 31–9 run to win the game 52–33. The game was the Jayhawks most points scored and the most yards they put up in the season to that point. Kansas quarterback Jason Bean set a career high with 323 yards, but also threw two interceptions. His first interception was the first he had thrown in the season. The loss extended the Jayhawks losing streak to FBS teams to 16.

=== At Iowa State ===
Kansas Jayhawks vs. Iowa State Cyclones

Quarter	1	2	3	4	Total
Kansas	0	0	7	0	7
Iowa State	28	10	14	7	59

at Jack Trice Stadium • Ames, IA

- Date: Saturday, October 2, 2021
- Game time: 6:00 p.m. CDT
- Game weather: Cloudy • Temperature: 72 °F (22 °C)
- Game attendance: 60,446
- TV announcers (FS1): Eric Collins, Devin Gardner

Game information

First quarter

- (10:33) ISU - Brock Purdy 36-yard pass to Xavier Hutchinson, Andrew Mevis kick good (Drive: 6 plays 70 yards, 03:07; ISU 7–0)
- (8:51) ISU - Brock Purdy 6 yard pass to Charlie Kolar, Connor Assalley kick good (Drive: 3 plays 24 yards, 01:08; ISU 14–0)
- (6:10) ISU - Brock Purdue 44 yard pass to Joe Scates, Andrew Mevis kick good (Drive: 1 play 44 yards, 00:07; ISU 21–0)
- (0:48) ISU - Brock Purdy 7 yard pass to Jirehl Brock, Connor Assalley kick good (Drive: 4 plays 32 yards, 01:28; ISU 28–0)

Second quarter

- (3:01) ISU - Breece Hall 9-yard rush, Andrew Mevi kick good (Drive: 7 plays 80 yards, 03:53; ISU 35–0)
- (0:00) ISU - Connor Assalley 26 yard field goal (Drive: 11 plays 58 yards, 02:02; ISU 38–0)

Third quarter

- (9:17) KU - Terry Locklin 12 yard rush, Jacob Borcila kick good (Drive: 9 plays 66 yards, 04:03; ISU 38–7)
- (5:27) ISU - Breece Hall 1 yard rush, Connor Assalley kick good (Drive: 7 plays 75 yards, 03:45; ISU 45–7)
- (2:27) ISU - Hunter Dekkers 41 yard rush, Andrew Mevis kick good (Drive: 4 plays 58 yards, 01:33; ISU 52–7)

Fourth quarter

- (3:13) ISU - Deon Silas 16 yard rush, Connor Assalley kick good (Drive: 6 plays 57 yards, 03:26; ISU 59–7)

Statistics	KU	ISU
First downs	18	25
Total yards	302	504
Rush yards	175	290
Passing yards	127	274
Turnovers	2	0
Time of possession	33:15	26:45

Team	Category	Player	Statistics
Kansas	Passing	Jason Bean	10/20 120 yards 1 INT
Kansas	Rushing	Devin Neal	15 carries 83 yards
Kansas	Receiving	Trevor Wilson	3 receptions 55 yards
Iowa State	Passing	Brock Purdy	17/22 245 yards 4 TD
Iowa State	Rushing	Breece Hall	17 carries 123 yards 2 TD
Iowa State	Receiving	Xavier Hutchinson	7 receptions 96 yards 1 TD

The Jayhawks began the game making early mistakes, two costly turnovers and missed field goal. The turnovers were a lost fumble on a run by quarterback Jason Bean and an interception in the redzone. Both turnovers and the missed field goal led to touchdowns from Iowa State. The Jayhawks would go into halftime with a 38–0 deficit. They would score first in the second half, but that would be followed by 21 unanswered points by Iowa State. The loss increased the Jayhawks road conference losing streak to 55 games.

=== vs Texas Tech ===
Texas Tech Red Raiders vs. Kansas Jayhawks

Quarter	1	2	3	4	Total
Texas Tech	7	17	14	3	41
Kansas	0	0	0	14	14

at David Booth Kansas Memorial Stadium • Lawrence, KS

- Date: Saturday, October 16, 2021
- Game time: 3:00 pm CDT
- Game weather: Sunny • Temperature: 69 °F (21 °C)
- Game attendance: 25,106
- Referee: Derek Anderson
- TV announcers (ESPN+): Roy Philpott, Ryan Leaf

Game information

First quarter

- (10:24) TTU – Henry Colombi 1 yard run, Jonathan Garibay kick good (Drive: 10 plays 75 yards, 4:32; TTU 7–0)

Second quarter

- (11:37) TTU – Jonathan Garibay 28 yard field goal (Drive: 8 plays 31 yards, 3:10; TTU 10–0)
- (5:28) TTU – Erik Ezukanma 9 yard run, Jonathan Garibay kick good (Drive: 10 plays 55 yards, 5:28; TTU 17–0)
- (0:32) TTU – Myles Price 7 yard run, Jonathan Garibay kick good (Drive: 7 plays 64 yards, 2:15; TTU 24–0)

Third quarter

- (6:50) TTU – Donovan Smith 5 yard run, Jonathan Garibay kick good (Drive: 11 plays 92 yards, 4:17; TTU 31–0)
- (1:57) TTU – Henry Colombi 2 yard pass to Travis Koontz, Jonathan Garibay kick good (Drive: 5 plays 57 yards, 2:15; TTU 38–0)

Fourth quarter

- (6:29) TTU – Jonathan Garibay 48 yard field goal (Drive: 9 plays 32 yards, 5:09; TTU 41–0)
- (0:52) KU – Miles Kendrick 14 yard pass to Luke Grimm, Jacob Borcila kick good (Drive: 10 plays 75 yards, 5:36; TTU 41–7)
- (0:05) KU – Miles Kendrick 13 yard pass to Lawrence Arnold, Jacob Borcila kick good (Drive: 5 plays 35 yards, 0:36; TTU 41–14)

Statistics	TTU	KU
First downs	22	17
Total yards	438	273
Rush yards	244	145
Passing yards	194	128
Turnovers	2	1
Time of possession	30:14	29:46

Team	Category	Player	Statistics
Texas Tech	Passing	Henry Colombi	14/20 124 yards 1 TD 1 INT
Texas Tech	Rushing	SaRodorick Thompson	13 carries 83 yards
Texas Tech	Receiving	Erik Ezukanma	5 receptions 76 yards
Kansas	Passing	Jason Bean	11/21 80 yards 1 INT
Kansas	Rushing	Devin Neal	15 carries 54 yards
Kansas	Receiving	Luke Grimm	3 receptions 33 yards 1 TD

The Jayhawks were dominated throughout most of the game, including trailing at halftime 24–0. Texas Tech would eventually score 41 unanswered points through 59 minutes of gametime. The Jayhawks wouldn't score until there were 52 seconds left in the game. They would score again with 5 seconds left to make the final score 41–14. The game extended the Jayhawks conference losing streak to 15 games and their losing streak against FBS opponents to 18 games.

=== vs No. 3 Oklahoma ===
No. 3 Oklahoma Sooners vs. Kansas Jayhawks

Quarter	1	2	3	4	Total
No. 3 Oklahoma	0	0	14	21	35
Kansas	7	3	7	6	23

at David Booth Kansas Memorial Stadium • Lawrence, KS

- Date: Saturday, October 23, 2021
- Game time: 11:00 a.m. CDT
- Game weather: Cloudy • Temperature : 54 °F (12 °C)
- Game attendance: 23,321
- Referee: Michael Vndervelde
- TV announcers (ESPN): Mark Jones, Robert Griffin III

Game information

First quarter

- (05:45) KU – Devin Neal 1 yard rush, Jacob Borcila kick good (Drive: 14 plays 80 yards, 9:11; KU 7-0)

Second quarter

- (11:24) KU – Jacob Borcila 28 yard field goal (Drive: 12 plays 69 yards, 6:36; KU 10-0)

Third quarter

- (7:57) OU – Caleb Williams 5 yard pass to Jadon Haselwood, Gabe Brkic kick good (Drive: 14 carries 75 yards, 7:03; KU 10-7)
- (1:30) KU – Devin Neal 1 yard rush, Jacob Borcila kick good (Drive: 10 carries 75 yards, 6:27; KU 17-7)
- (0:14) OU – Caleb Williams 8 yard pass to Jeremiah Hall, Gabe Brkic kick good (Drive: 3 plays 75 yards, 1:16; KU 17-14)

Fourth quarter

- (12:35) OU – Kennedy Brooks 1 yard rush, Gabe Brkic kick good (Drive: 4 plays 48 yards, 1:28; OU 21-17)
- (7:53) OU – Caleb Williams 40 yard rush, Gabe Brkic kick good (Drive: 4 plays 47 yards, 1:29; OU 28-17)
- (5:56) KU – Jason Bean 14 yard pass to Luke Grimm, Kwamie Lassiter II rush failed (Drive: 5 plays 75 yards, 1:57; OU 28-23)
- (0:42) OU – Kennedy Brooks 4 yard rush, Gabe Brkic kick good (Drive: 12 carries 75 yards, 5:14; OU 35-23)

Statistics	OU	KU
First downs	18	23
Total yards	398	412
Rush yards	220	166
Passing yards	178	246
Turnovers	0	1
Time of possession	24:30	35:30

Team	Category	Player	Statistics
Oklahoma	Passing	Caleb Williams	15/20 178 yards 2 TD 1 INT
Oklahoma	Rushing	Kennedy Brooks	24 carries 79 yards
Oklahoma	Receiving	Eric Gray	3 receptions 42 yards
Kansas	Passing	Jason Bean	17/23 246 yards 1 TD
Kansas	Rushing	Devin Neal	23 carries 100 yards 2 TD
Kansas	Receiving	Kwamie Lassiter II	7 receptions 101 yards

Despite a power outage in the stadium in the first quarter, the Jayhawks jumped out to a 10–0, a lead they carried into halftime. Oklahoma wouldn't score until halfway through the 3rd quarter to make the game 10–7. Kansas would respond on the following drive with their own touchdown to get back to a 10-point lead. The Sooners would then score 21 unanswered points, including a touchdown following a controversial 4th down call in the fourth quarter. The Jayhawks would score again with 5:56 left in the game, but OU would put the game away with a touchdown with 42 seconds left. KU lost despite outgaining OU on offense and winning the time of possession battle. The loss extended the Jayhawks losing streak to teams ranked in the AP poll to 43 games. The loss also extended the Jayhawks conference losing streak to 16 games and their losing streak against FBS opponents to 19 games.

=== At No. 15 Oklahoma State ===
Kansas Jayhawks vs. No. 15 Oklahoma State Cowboys

Quarter	1	2	3	4	Total
Kansas	0	0	3	0	3
No. 15 Oklahoma State	17	21	7	10	55

at Boone Pickens Stadium • Stillwater, OK

- Date: Saturday, October 30, 2021
- Game time: 6:00 pm CDT
- Game weather: Sunny • Temperature : 71 °F (22 °C)
- Game attendance: 55,026
- Referee: Brandon Cruse
- TV announcers (FS1): Tim Brando, Spencer Tillman

Game information

First quarter

- (5:49) OSU – Spencer Sanders 4-yard run, Tanner Brown kick good (Drive: 8 plays 68 yards, 2:30; OSU 7–0)
- (3:43) OSU – Tanner Brown 49 yard field goal (Drive: 4 plays 5 yards, 1:59; OSU 10–0)
- (0:26) OSU – Spencer Sanders 4 yard pass to Brennan Presley, Tanner Brown kick good (Drive: 4 plays 19 yards, 1:31; OSU 17–0)

Second quarter

- (11:42) OSU – Spencer Sanders 36 yard pass to Tay Martin, Tanner Brown kick good (Drive: 4 plays 70 yards, 1:53; OSU 24–0)
- (5:58) OSU – Brennan Presley 14 yard run, Tanner Brown kick good (Drive: 6 plays 67 yards, 2:00; OSU 31–0)
- (2:21) OSU – Dominic Richardson 5 yard run, Tanner Brown kick good (Drive: 5 plays 34 yards, 1:12; OSU 38–0)

Third quarter

- (11:15) OSU – Shane Illingworth 12 yard pass to Bryson Green, Tanner Brown kick good (Drive: 9 plays 75 yards, 3:45; OSU 45–0)
- (3:50) KU – Jacob Borcila 45 yard field goal (Drive: 12 plays 48 yards, 7:25; OSU 45–3)

Fourth quarter

- (14:28) OSU – Shane Illingworth 2 yard pass to John Paul Richardson, Tanner Brown kick good (Drive: 10 plays 82 yards, 4:22; OSU 52–3)
- (10:54) OSU – Alex Hale 26 yard field goal (Drive: 4 plays 4 yards, 1:11; OU 55–3)

Statistics	KU	OSU
First downs	7	31
Total yards	143	535
Rush yards	99	292
Passing yards	44	243
Turnovers	3	0
Time of possession	28:52	31:08

Team	Category	Player	Statistics
Kansas	Passing	Miles Kendrick	6/8 35 yards 1 INT
Kansas	Rushing	Miles Kendrick	8 carries 29 yards
Kansas	Receiving	Kwamie Lassiter II	2 receptions 11 yards
Oklahoma State	Passing	Spencer Sanders	12/19 157 yards 2 TD
Oklahoma State	Rushing	Dominic Richardson	11 carries 79 yards 1 TD
Oklahoma State	Receiving	Tay Martin	5 receptions 84 yards 1 TD

The Jayhawks were dominated in the first half. They went into halftime down 38–0. They also failed to earn a first down in the first half, while allowing 21 first downs. They were outgained 331–49. The Cowboys had their backup quarterback in by the end of the first half. The Jayhawks would lose 55–3, tying their worse loss of the season. The loss extended the Jayhawks losing streak to teams ranked in the AP poll to 44 games. The loss also extended the Jayhawks conference losing streak to 17 games and their losing streak against FBS opponents to 20 games. The loss also made the Jayhawks ineligible for a bowl game for the 13th consecutive season.

=== vs Kansas State ===
Kansas State Wildcats vs. Kansas Jayhawks

Quarter	1	2	3	4	Total
Kansas State	14	7	7	7	35
Kansas	3	0	7	0	10

at David Booth Kansas Memorial Stadium • Lawrence, KS

- Date: Saturday, November 6, 2021
- Game time: 11:00 am CDT
- Game weather: Sunny • Temperature : 53 °F (12 °C)
- Game attendance: 30,611
- Referee: Scott Campbell
- TV announcers (FS1): Adam Alexander, Devin Gardner

Game information

First quarter

- (5:35) KSU – Deuce Vaughn run for 1 yd for a TD, Chris Tennant kick good (Drive: 8 plays 72 yards, 4:42; 7–0 KSU)
- (2:49) KU – Jacob Borcila 40 yard field goal (Drive: 6 plays 54 yards, 2:39; 7–3 KSU)
- (1:57) KSU – Skylar Thompson 68 yard pass to Malik Knowles, Chris Tennant kick good (Drive: 2 plays 70 yards, 0:46; KSU 14–3)

Second quarter

- (2:48) KSU – Ben Sinnott 1 yard run, Chris Tennant kick good (Drive: 8 plays, 79 yards, 4:09; KSU 21–3)

Third quarter

- (14:45) KSU – Deuce Vaughn 80 yard run, Chris Tennant kick good (Drive: 1 play 75 yards, 0:15; KSU 28–3)
- (3:02) KU – Jalon Daniels 15 yard pass to Kwamie Lassiter II, Jacob Borcila kick good (Drive: 8 plays 80 yards, 4:26; KSU 28–10)

Fourth quarter

- (10:44) KSU – Deuce Vaughn 1 yard run, Chris Tennant kick good (Drive: 13 plays 75 yards, 7:13; KSU 35–10)

Statistics	KSU	KU
First downs	22	15
Total yards	499	274
Rush yards	242	88
Passing yards	257	186
Turnovers	0	0
Time of possession	31:38	28:22

Team	Category	Player	Statistics
Kansas State	Passing	Skylar Thompson	19/24 244 yards 1 TD
Kansas State	Rushing	Deuce Vaughn	11 carries 162 yards 3 TD
Kansas State	Receiving	Malik Knowles	3 receptions 94 yards 1 TD
Kansas	Passing	Jalon Daniels	13/19 105 yards 1 TD
Kansas	Rushing	Devin Neal	19 carries 62 yards
Kansas	Receiving	Kwamie Lassiter II	6 receptions 82 yards 1 TD

Early in the game, the Jayhawks had their starting quarterback and backup quarterback go down with an injury. K-State would just be too much for the Jayhawks as KU wouldn't score its first touchdown until the 3rd quarter. The 35–10 loss is the Jayhawks 8th straight overall loss, 18th straight within the Big 12, 20th straight to FBS opponents, and their 13th straight loss to their cross state rival K-State.

=== At Texas ===
Kansas Jayhawks vs. Texas Longhorns

Quarter	1	2	3	4	OT	Total
Kansas	14	21	7	7	8	57
Texas	0	14	21	14	7	56

at Darrell K Royal–Texas Memorial Stadium • Austin, TX

- Date: Saturday, November 13, 2021
- Game time: 6:30 pm CDT
- Game weather: Sunny • Temperature: Not provided
- Game attendance: 95,202
- Referee: David Alvarez
- TV announcers (ESPNU): Roy Philpott, Kelly Stouffer

Game information

First quarter

- (7:58) KU – Devin Neal 3 yard run, Jacob Borcila kick good (Drive: 13 plays 75 yards, 7:02; 7–0 KU)
- (0:36) KU – Jalon Daniels 11 yard to Mason Fairchild for 11 yards, Jacob Borcila kick good (Drive: 10 plays 65 yards, 5:04; 14–0 KU)

Second quarter

- (12:14) UT – Casey Thompson 25 yard pass to Marcus Washington, Cameron Dicker good (Drive: 10 plays 75 yards, 3:22; 14–7 KU)
- (8:48) UT – Hudson Card 33 yard pass complete to Xavier Worthy, Cameron Dicker kick good (Drive: 6 plays 68 yards, 2:22; 14–14)
- (2:25) KU – Jalon Daniels 9 yard run, Jacob Borcila kick good (Drive: 11 plays 75 yards, 6:23; 21–14 KU)
- (1:14) KU – Jalon Daniels 19 yard pass to Devin Neal, Jacob Borcila kick good (Drive: 3 plays 23 yards, 0:21; 28–14 KU)
- (1:00) KU – Jacobee Bryant 19 yard interception return, Jacob Borcila kick good (1 play 0 yards, 0:09; 35–14 KU)

Third quarter

- (11:17) UT – Casey Thompson 1 yard run, Cameron Dicker kick good (Drive: 10 plays 65 yards, 3:43; 35–21 KU)
- (8:59) KU – Devin Neal 10 yard run, Jacob Borcila kick good (Drive: 4 plays 75 yards, 2:18; 42–21 KU)
- (3:50) UT – Casey Thompson 25 yard pass to Bijan Robinson, Cameron Dicker kick good (Drive: 8 plays 88 yards, 2:37; 42–28 KU)
- (1:21) UT – Casey Thompson 7 yard pass Xavier Worthy, Cameron Dicker kick good (Drive: 3 plays 17 yards, 0:44; 42–35 KU)

Fourth quarter

- (8:47) KU – Jalon Daniels 2 yard pass to Kwamie Lassiter II, Jacob Borcila kick good (Drive: 9 plays 73 yards, 5:11; 49–35 KU)
- (4:39) UT – Casey Thompson 8 yard pass to Xavier Worthy, Cameron Dicker kick good (Drive: 11 plays 91 yards, 3:57; 49–42 KU)
- (0:22) UT – Casey Thompson 25 yard pass to Cade Brewer, Cameron Dicker kick good (Drive: 3 plays 34 yards, 0:22; 49–49)

Overtime

- UT – Casey Thompson 8 yard pass to M. Washington, Cameron Dicker kick good (Drive: 3 plays; UT 56–49)
- KU – Devin Neal 2 yard run, Jalon Daniels pass to Jared Casey good (Drive: 4 plays; KU 57–56)

Statistics	KU	UT
First downs	22	30
Total yards	420	574
Rush yards	218	164
Passing yards	202	410
Turnovers	0	4
Time of possession	35:18	24:42

Team	Category	Player	Statistics
Kansas	Passing	Jalon Daniels	21/30 202 yards 3 TD
Kansas	Rushing	Devin Neal	24 carries 143 yards 3 TD
Kansas	Receiving	Kwamie Lassiter II	8 receptions 68 yards TD
Texas	Passing	Casey Thompson	30/43 358 yards 6 TD 1 INT
Texas	Rushing	Bijan Robinson	14 carries 70 yards
Texas	Receiving	Xavier Worthy	14 receptions 152 yards 3 TD

The Jayhawks jumped out to a 14–0 lead in the game, only for Texas to score 14 unanswered points to the tie game. Kansas would then score three touchdowns in 1:25 of game time to make the score 35–14 at halftime. Texas would outscore the Jayhawks 35–14 in the second half to send the game into overtime. The Longhorns would score in three plays on their first possession, but a unsportsmanlike conduct penalty would give the Jayhawks a short field to start their possession. A two yard run from Devin Neal made the score 56–55 Texas. Kansas coach Lance Leipold would take the risky play and go for the two point conversion. The risk would prove successful as Jared Casey would catch the pass in the end zone giving KU the win 57–56. The win ended multiple losing streaks for Kansas: 8 straight overall losses, 18 straight within the Big 12, 20 straight to FBS opponents, and 56 straight in road conference games. The win was also the Jayhawks first ever victory in Austin and only their 4th all-time victory against Texas. The Jayhawks last defeated the Longhorns in 2016, however, prior to that, they hadn't defeated Texas since 1938.

=== At TCU ===
Kansas Jayhawks vs. TCU Horned Frogs

Quarter	1	2	3	4	Total
Kansas	7	7	0	14	28
TCU	7	0	14	10	31

at Amon G. Carter Stadium • Fort Worth, TX

- Date: Saturday, November 20, 2021
- Game time: 3:00 pm CDT
- Game weather: Sunny • Temperature: 73 °F (23 °C)
- Game attendance: 35,061
- Referee: Kevin Hassell
- TV announcers (ESPN+): Courtney Lyle, Ryan Leaf

Game information

First quarter

- (10:33) TCU – Derius Davis 43 yard run, Griffin Kell kick good (Drive: 5 plays 83 yards, 2:23; TCU 7–0)
- (5:43) KU – Jalon Daniels 14 yard run, Jacob Borcila kick good (Drive: 9 plays 75 yards, 4:50; 7–7)

Second quarter

- (12:29) KU – Devin Neal 2 yard run, Jacob Borcila kick good (Drive: 8 plays 82 yards, 4:13; KU 14–7)

Third quarter

- (13:32) TCU – Kendre Miller 56 yard run, Griffin Kell kick good (Drive: 3 plays 65 yards, 1:25; 14–14)
- (6:55) TCU – Max Duggan 1 yard run, Griffin Kell kick good (Drive: 10 plays 74 yards, 4:40; TCU 21–14)

Fourth quarter

- (11:43) TCU – Emari Demercado 1 yard run, Griffin Kell kick good (Drive: 12 plays 99 yards, 6:44; TCU 28–14)
- (9:23) KU – Jalon Daniels 23 yard pass to Luke Grimm, Jacob Borcila kick good (Drive: 5 plays 74 yards, 2:14; TCU 28–21)
- (4:46) KU – Jalon Daniels 10 yard pass to Jared Casey, Jacob Borcila kick good (Drive: 8 plays 65 yards; 3:13 28–28)
- (0:06) TCU – Griffin Kell 25 yard field goal (Drive: 14 plays 67 yards, 4:40; TCU 31–28)

Statistics	KU	TCU
First downs	21	19
Total yards	379	492
Rush yards	124	326
Passing yards	255	166
Turnovers	1	2
Time of possession	29:49	30:11

Team	Category	Player	Statistics
Kansas	Passing	Jalon Daniels	22/30 255 yards 2 TD 1 INT
Kansas	Rushing	Devin Neal	14 carries 59 yards 1 TD
Kansas	Receiving	Kwamie Lassiter II	8 receptions 101 yards
TCU	Passing	Max Duggan	10/16 166 yards 1 INT
TCU	Rushing	Kendre Miller	12 carries 112 yards 1 TD
TCU	Receiving	Derius Davis	6 receptions 103 yards

TCU struck first in the 1st quarter. KU would score 14 unanswered point in response to take a 14–7 lead into halftime. TCU would begin the second half with 21 unanswered points to take a 28–14 lead. KU would respond with 14 unanswered points to tie it 28–28 with just under 5 minutes left. TCU would drive down the field and get into field goal position with 1:05 left on the clock, but KU coach Lance Leipold did not call any of his three timeouts until there was 25 seconds left. TCU would kick a field goal with 6 seconds left. The Jayhawks attempted several laterals on the kickoff return, but failed to make the miracle play.

=== vs West Virginia ===
West Virginia vs. Kansas Jayhawks

Quarter	1	2	3	4	Total
West Virginia	7	14	10	3	34
Kansas	6	7	8	7	28

at David Booth Kansas Memorial Stadium • Lawrence, KS

- Date: Saturday, November 27, 2021
- Game time: 6:00 pm CDT
- Game weather: Sunny • Temperature: 52 °F (11 °C)
- Game attendance: 23,117
- Referee: Tuta Salaam
- TV announcers (FS1): Guy Haberman, Charles Arbuckle

Game information

First quarter

- (11:14) KU – Jacob Borcila 46 field goal (Drive: 8 plays 47 yards, 3:37; KU 3–0)
- (5:28) WVU – Jarret Doege 14 yard pass to Winston Wright Jr., Casey Legg kick good (Drive: 6 plays 84 yards, 2:50; WVU 7–3)
- (2:07) KU – Jacob Borcila 35 yard field goal (Drive: 8 plays 61 yards, 3:13; WVU 7–6)

Second quarter

- (10:02) WVU – Jarret Doege 14 yard pass Winston Wright Jr., Casey Legg kick good (Drive: 14 plays 75 yards, 6:59; WVU 14–6)
- (7:24) KU – Jalon Daniels 8 yard pass complete to Jared Casey, Jacob Borcila kick good (Drive: 5 plays 65 yards, 2:41; WVU 14–13)
- (0:17) WVU – Jarret Doege 7 yard pass to Sam James, Casey Legg kick good (Drive: 6 plays 59 yards, 1:23; WVU 21–13)

Third quarter

- (12:33) KU – Gaven Potter 27 yard interception return, Jalon Daniels pass to Earl Bostick Jr. good (Drive: 1 play 0 yards, 0:09; 21–21)
- (8:32) WVU – Leddie Brown 44 yard run, Casey Legg kick good (Drive: 9 plays 75 yards, 3:58; WVU 28–21)
- (0:31) WVU – Casey Legg 38 yard field goal (Drive: 9 plays 30 yards, 4:11; WVU 31–21)

Fourth quarter

- (5:53) WVU – Casey Legg 37 yard field goal (Drive: 9 plays 60 yards, 4:38; WVU 34–21)
- (1:43) KU – Jalon Daniels 3 run, Jacob Borcila kick good (Drive: 5 plays 68 yards, 1:02; WVU 34–28)

Statistics	WVU	KU
First downs	15	23
Total yards	436	336
Rush yards	261	87
Passing yards	175	249
Turnovers	2	2
Time of possession	32:28	26:37

Team	Category	Player	Statistics
West Virginia	Passing	Jarret Doege	16/21 170 yards 3 TD 1 INT
West Virginia	Rushing	Leddie Brown	19 carries 156 yards 1 TD
West Virginia	Receiving	Sean Ryan	5 receptions 87 yards
Kansas	Passing	Jalon Daniels	22/32 249 yards 1 TD 2 INT
Kansas	Rushing	Amauri Pesek-Hickson	12 carries 69 yards
Kansas	Receiving	Luke Grimm	4 receptions 105 yards

The Jayhawks would strike first on senior night with a field goal. However, this would be the only time Kansas would lead in the game. West Virginia scored a touchdown in the first quarter to take the lead. Kansas responded with a field goal. West Virginia and Kansas would trade touchdowns afterwards. The Mountaineers would take a 21–13 lead to halftime. Kansas would score first in the second half with an interception returned for a touchdown. West Virginia would score a touchdown and two field goals to take a 34–21 lead. The Jayhawks would score a late touchdown but it would be too late as they would lose 34–28.

== All-Big 12 selections ==
Second team

- DE Kyron Johnson
- S Kenny Logan Jr.

Honorable mention

- OL Earl Bostick Jr.
- WR Kwamie Lassiter II
- S Kenny Logan Jr.
- LB Rich Miller
- RB Devin Neal
- OL Mike Novitsky
