= Scotty Walden =

American football player and coach (born 1989)

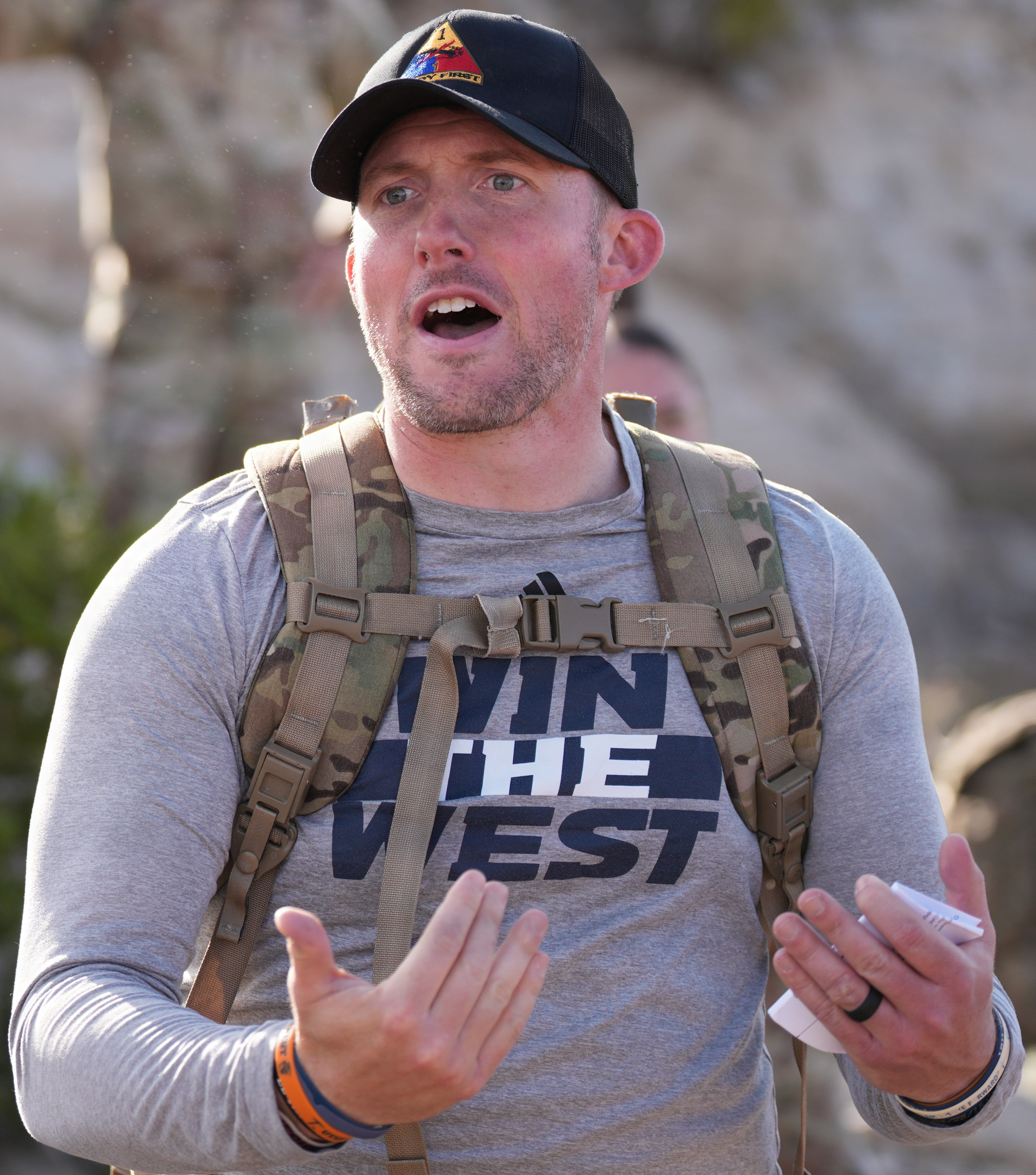
- Walden in 2026

Biographical details
- Born: November 15, 1989 (age 37); Cleburne, Texas, U.S.
- Education: Sul Ross State University; B.A., History

Playing career
- 2008: Dordt
- 2009–2010: Hardin–Simmons
- 2011: Sul Ross
- Positions: Quarterback, safety

Coaching career (HC unless noted)
- 2012: Sul Ross (OC)
- 2013–2015: East Texas Baptist (OC)
- 2016: East Texas Baptist
- 2017–2018: Southern Miss (WR)
- 2019–2020: Southern Miss (co-OC/WR)
- 2020: Southern Miss (interim HC)
- 2020–2023: Austin Peay
- 2024–2026: UTEP

Head coaching record
- Overall: 40–48

Accomplishments and honors

Championships
- 1 ASUN (2022); 1 UAC (2023)

Scotty Walden (born November 15, 1989) is an American college football coach. He last served as the head football coach for the University of Texas at El Paso, a position he had held from 2024–2026. Walden had previously served as the head coach at East Texas Baptist University, Austin Peay State University, and interim head coach at the University of Southern Mississippi.

== Playing career ==
Walden graduated from Cleburne High School in Cleburne, Texas. Following high school he attended three different colleges: Dordt College in Sioux Center, Iowa (2008–2009), Hardin–Simmons University in Abilene, Texas (2009–2011), and finally Sul Ross State University in Alpine, Texas (2011–2012). He played football at all three institutions, and started as quarterback in 2008 and 2011.

== Coaching career ==
Walden's coaching career began in the spring of 2012, while he was still an undergraduate at Sul Ross. He worked as an offensive assistant under offensive coordinator John Tyree; when Tyree stepped down at the end of the academic year head coach Wayne Schroeder named Walden to replace him. Sul Ross's offense flourished in 2012, and at the end of the season Joshua Eargle, the new head coach at conference rival East Texas Baptist University, hired Walden away to become offensive coordinator on his staff.

Eargle resigned from the East Texas Baptist job in January 2016, and the university promoted Walden, then 26, to replace him. At the time of his hiring, the NCAA believed Walden to be the youngest college head football coach in the United States. After one year at East Texas Baptist, during which the team compiled a 7–3 record, Walden departed in 2017 to become the wide receivers coach at the University of Southern Mississippi under head coach Jay Hopson, replacing John Wozniak. Walden gained the title of co-offensive coordinator in 2019.

Southern Miss named Walden interim head coach on September 7, 2020, after Hopson stepped down.

On October 27, 2020, Walden was named the new head coach for Austin Peay.

Walden took over coaching duties after non-conference play in 2020–21 and led Austin Peay to a 4–2 record in the conference while the team finished 4–5 overall.

Walden was hired as UTEP Miners head coach on December 4, 2023. UTEP fired Walden on November 16, 2026, with two games remaining in the 2026 season.

== Head coaching record ==
Year	Team	Overall	Conference	Standing	Bowl/playoffs	Coaches^{#}	STATS^{°}
East Texas Baptist Tigers (American Southwest Conference) (2016)
2016	East Texas Baptist	7–3	3–3	4th			
East Texas Baptist:		7–3	3–3				
Southern Miss Golden Eagles (Conference USA) (2020)
2020	Southern Miss	1–3	1–1				
Southern Miss:		1–3	1–1				
Austin Peay Governors (Ohio Valley Conference) (2020–2021)
2020–21	Austin Peay	4–2	4–2	3rd			21
2021	Austin Peay	6–5	4–2	T–2nd			
Austin Peay Governors (ASUN Conference) (2022)
2022	Austin Peay	7–4	3–2	T–1st			
Austin Peay Governors (United Athletic Conference) (2023)
2023	Austin Peay	9–3	6–0	1st	L NCAA Division I First Round	10	13
Austin Peay:		26–14	17–6				
UTEP Miners (Conference USA) (2024–2025)
2024	UTEP	3–9	3–5	T–6th			
2025	UTEP	2–10	1–7	T–11th			
UTEP Miners (Mountain West Conference) (2026)
2026	UTEP	1–9 (Note: UTEP fired Walden with two games remaining.)	0–6				
UTEP:		6–28	4–18				
Total:		40–48					
National championship Conference title Conference division title or championship game berth
