= Calvin Ruzicka =

American football coach (born c. 1965)

Current position
- Title: Head coach
- Team: East Texas Baptist
- Conference: ASC
- Record: 17–22

Biographical details
- Born: c. 1965 (age 60–61)
- Education: Southwest Texas State University (1988)

Coaching career (HC unless noted)
- 1999–2000: Texas Christian Academy (TX)
- 2001–2017: Cedar Hill HS (TX) (ST/DB)
- 2018–2022: East Texas Baptist (AHC/DC)
- 2023–present: East Texas Baptist

Head coaching record
- Overall: 17–22 (college); 18–4 (high school)

Calvin Ruzicka (born c. 1965) is an American college football coach. He is the head football coach for East Texas Baptist University, a position he has held since 2023. He was the head football coach for Texas Christian Academy from 1999 to 2000. He also coached for Cedar Hill High School.

== Head coaching record ==
=== College ===
Year	Team	Overall	Conference	Standing	Bowl/playoffs
East Texas Baptist Tigers (American Southwest Conference) (2023–present)
2023	East Texas Baptist	5–5	3–3	T–3rd	
2024	East Texas Baptist	5–4	2–4	3rd	
2025	East Texas Baptist	4–6	0–6	4th	
2026	East Texas Baptist	3–7	1–4	5th	
East Texas Baptist:		17–22	6–17		
Total:		17–22			
