= Mark Sartain =

American football coach

Biographical details
- Born: c. 1959

Playing career
- 1981: Austin

Coaching career (HC unless noted)
- 1983–1985: Athens HS (TX) (assistant)
- 1986–1988: Cross Roads (TX)
- 1989–1990: Eustace (TX)
- 1991–1994: Trinity Valley (OC)
- 1995–2002: White Oak HS (TX)
- 2003–2006: Trinity Valley
- 2007–2012: East Texas Baptist
- 2013–2014: Spring Hill HS (TX)
- 2015–2016: Marshall HS (TX) (STC)
- 2017–2018: Lindale HS (TX) (assistant)
- 2019–2021: Tatum HS (TX) (STC/OL)

Administrative career (AD unless noted)
- 1995–2002: White Oak HS (TX)

Head coaching record
- Overall: 26–34 (college); 17–23 (junior college)
- Bowls: 1–0 (junior college)
- Tournaments: 2–1 (SWJCFC playoffs)

Accomplishments and honors

Championships
- 1 SWJCFC (2005)

Mark Sartain (born c. 1959) is an American former football coach and athletics administrator. He served as the head football coach at Trinity Valley Community College (TVCC) in Athens, Texas from 2003 to 2006 and East Texas Baptist University from 2007 to 2012.

Sartain is a native of Van Alstyne, Texas. He graduated from Austin College in Sherman, Texas, where he played college football and was a member of the 1981 Austin Kangaroos football team, which won an NAIA Division II championship. Sartain was the head football coach at White Oak High School in White Oak, Texas from 1995 to 2002, compiling a record of 43–41 in eight season and led his teams to three playoff appearances. He succeeded Chuck Langston as head football coach at Trinity Valley in 2003. In 2004, Sartain led Trinity Valley to a 9–3, a Southwest Junior College Football Conference (SWJCFC) title, and a win in the Pilgrim's Pride Bowl.

== Head coaching record ==
=== College ===
Year	Team	Overall	Conference	Standing	Bowl/playoffs
East Texas Baptist Tigers (American Southwest Conference) (2007–2012)
2007	East Texas Baptist	5–5	5–3	4th	
2008	East Texas Baptist	5–5	5–3	T–3rd	
2009	East Texas Baptist	3–7	3–5	6th	
2010	East Texas Baptist	5–5	4–4	T–4th	
2011	East Texas Baptist	5–5	4–4	T–4th	
2012	East Texas Baptist	3–7	2–5	T–5th	
East Texas Baptist:		26–34	23–24		
Total:		26–34			

=== Junior college ===
Year	Team	Overall	Conference	Standing	Bowl/playoffs
Trinity Valley Cardinals (Southwest Junior College Football Conference) (2003–2006)
2003	Trinity Valley	3–6	1–5	T–5th	
2004	Trinity Valley	3–7	2–4	T–4th	L SWJCFC semifinal
2005	Trinity Valley	9–3	4–2	T–1st	W SWJCFC championship, W Pilgrim's Pride Bowl
2006	Trinity Valley	2–7	2–4	T–5th	
Trinity Valley:		17–23	9–15		
Total:		17–23			
National championship Conference title Conference division title or championship game berth
