= Scott Highsmith =

American football coach

Coaching career (HC unless noted)
- 1999–2000: Kentucky (WR/RB)
- 2001–2002: Belhaven (OC/QB)
- 2003–2005: Belhaven
- 2006: Southeastern Louisiana (OC/QB)
- 2011–2012: McMurry (RB/RC)
- 2013–2014: Southeastern Oklahoma State (QB/RC)
- 2015–2016: East Texas Baptist (PCG/WR)
- 2017: East Texas Baptist (HC/OC)

Head coaching record
- Overall: 20–23

Scott Highsmith is an American college football coach. He was the head football coach at East Texas Baptist University for the 2017 season. Highsmith was the third head football coach at Belhaven College in Jackson, Mississippi and he held that position for three seasons, from 2003 until 2005. His record at Belhaven was 13–20. He resigned in 2005 to take an assistant coaching position at Southeastern Louisiana University under his previous mentor Dennis Roland.

Highsmith had spent 27 years in coaching as an assistant coach for various colleges and universities before taking the head coach position at Belhaven. He earned a bachelor of science from Howard Payne University and a MS degree from East Texas State University.

== Head coaching record ==
Year	Team	Overall	Conference	Standing	Bowl/playoffs
Belhaven Blazers (Mid-South Conference) (2003–2005)
2003	Belhaven	4–7	2–7	T–8th	
2004	Belhaven	4–7	3–7	T–9th	
2005	Belhaven	5–6	4–4 / 3–2 (West)	T–2nd (West)	
Belhaven:		13–20	9–18		
East Texas Baptist Tigers (American Southwest Conference) (2017–present)
2017	East Texas Baptist	7–3	6–3	T–3rd	
East Texas Baptist:		7–3	6–3		
Total:		20–23			
