= Kwamie Lassiter =

American football player (1969–2019)

No. 42
- Position: Defensive back

Personal information
- Born: December 3, 1969; Hampton, Virginia, U.S.
- Died: January 6, 2019 (aged 49); Chandler, Arizona, U.S.
- Listed height: 6 ft 0 in (1.83 m)
- Listed weight: 207 lb (94 kg)

Career information
- High school: Menchville (Newport News, Virginia)
- College: Butler County (1989–1990); Kansas (1991–1994)
- NFL draft: 1995: undrafted

Career history
- Arizona Cardinals (1995–2002); San Diego Chargers (2003); St. Louis Rams (2004)

Awards and highlights
- Second-team All-Big 8 (1994); NFL record: Most passes intercepted in a single game: 4 (tied)

Career NFL statistics
- Total tackles: 609
- Interceptions: 25
- Defensive touchdowns: 2
- Stats at Pro Football Reference

Kwamie Lassiter (December 3, 1969 – January 6, 2019) was an American professional football player who was a safety in the National Football League (NFL). He was signed by the Arizona Cardinals as an undrafted free agent in 1995. He played college football for the Kansas Jayhawks.

== Early life ==
Born in Hampton, Virginia, Lassiter graduated from Menchville High School in Newport News, Virginia in 1989.

== College career ==
Lassiter played his first two years of college football at Butler County Community College in 1989 and 1990 before transferring to the University of Kansas in 1991. He sat out the 1991 season, played at Kansas from 1992 to 1994, and graduated with a degree in communications. After Lassiter suffered a broken collarbone by the third game of the 1993 season, the NCAA granted Lassiter a sixth year of eligibility.

== Professional career ==
Lassiter played for the Arizona Cardinals from 1995 to 2002, San Diego Chargers in 2003 and St. Louis Rams in 2004. He finished his career with 609 tackles (437 solo tackles), 25 interceptions, and four sacks.

In the Cardinals' final regular season game of the 1998 season, a 16-13 victory over the San Diego Chargers that clinched the Cardinals' first playoff berth in 15 years, Lassiter intercepted Chargers quarterback Craig Whelihan four times.

After the 2001 season, Lassiter was selected as an alternate for the 2002 Pro Bowl after reaching career highs with 112 tackles and 9 interceptions.

Lassiter spent the 2003 season with the Chargers, but he was cut during the 2004 preseason. The St. Louis Rams signed Lassiter on September 21, 2004.

=== NFL statistics ===
Year	Team	Games	Comb.	Tack.	Asst.	Sacks	FF	FR	INT	TDs	Def
1995	ARI	5	7	5	2	0.0	0	0	0	0	0
1996	ARI	14	16	13	3	0.0	0	0	1	0	2
1997	ARI	16	39	24	15	3.0	0	0	1	0	2
1998	ARI	16	55	40	15	0.0	2	1	8	0	12
1999	ARI	16	114	80	34	0.0	0	2	2	1	7
2000	ARI	16	101	67	34	0.0	1	1	1	0	2
2001	ARI	16	113	84	29	1.0	1	0	9	0	15
2002	ARI	16	96	65	31	0.0	0	1	2	0	9
2003	SD	10	59	51	8	0.0	1	0	1	1	1
2004	STL	4	9	8	1	0.0	0	0	0	0	0
Career		129	609	437	172	4.0	5	5	25	2	49

== Post-playing career ==
From 2006 to 2008, Lassiter was a pregame and postgame host for the Arizona Cardinals Radio Network.

From 2009 until his death, Lassiter hosted Kwamie Lassiter's Sports Talk on the VoiceAmerica Internet radio network.

From 2010 until his death, Lassiter was president of the NFL Alumni chapter in Arizona.

From 2009 to 2010, Lassiter was defensive backs coach at Mesa Community College. In 2012, Lassiter became defensive backs coach for the Las Vegas Locomotives of the UFL.

== Personal life ==
Three of Lassiter's sons, Kwamie II, Darius and Kwinton, have played college football or in the NFL. Kwamie II played for the Cincinnati Bengals, having played college football at his father's alma mater Kansas. Kwinton also plays at Kansas, while Darius plays for BYU

Lassiter's daughter, Darian, is a professional dancer who was on the Arizona Cardinals cheerleaders, the Phoenix Suns dance team, and ultimately a member of the Dallas Cowboys Cheerleaders, appearing on season 15 of their reality television show Dallas Cowboys Cheerleaders: Making the Team.

=== Death ===
On January 6, 2019, Lassiter died unexpectedly at the age of 49. He had a heart attack while he was exercising.
