= Kwamie Lassiter II =

American football player (born 1998)

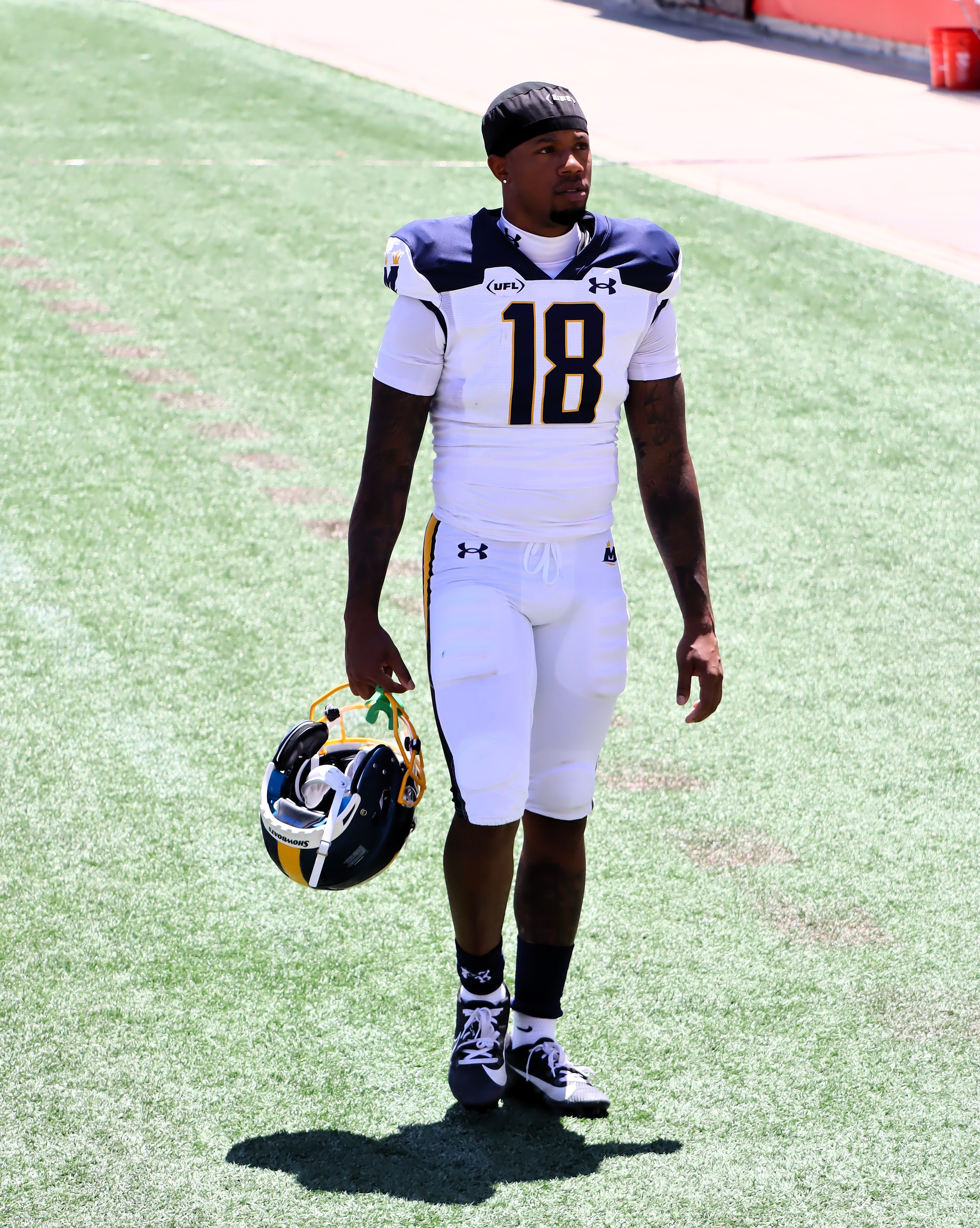
- Lassiter with the Memphis Showboats in 2025

Profile
- Position: Wide receiver

Personal information
- Born: January 21, 1998 (age 28); Chandler, Arizona, U.S.
- Listed height: 5 ft 11 in (1.80 m)
- Listed weight: 185 lb (84 kg)

Career information
- High school: Hamilton (Chandler)
- College: Kansas (2016–2021)
- NFL draft: 2022: undrafted

Career history
- Cincinnati Bengals (2022–2023); Memphis Showboats (2025); Kansas City Chiefs (2025)*; Louisville Kings (2026)*
- * Offseason or practice squad member only

Career NFL statistics
- Receptions: 1
- Receiving yards: 2
- Stats at Pro Football Reference

Kwamie Lassiter II (born January 21, 1998) is an American professional football wide receiver. He played college football for the Kansas Jayhawks and was signed as an undrafted free agent in 2022 by the Cincinnati Bengals.

== College career ==
Lassiter caught 148 passes for 1,550 yards and seven touchdowns in five seasons at Kansas, earning two All-Big 12 honorable mentions.

=== College statistics ===
Season	Team	Games		Receiving			
Season	Team	GP	GS	Rec	Yds	Avg	TD
2016	Kansas	Redshirted (redshirt)					
2017	Kansas	5	0	0	0	0.0	0
2018	Kansas	11	3	12	87	7.9	1
2019	Kansas	11	3	34	352	10.4	1
2020	Kansas	9	8	43	458	10.7	2
2021	Kansas	12	12	59	653	11.1	3
Career		48	26	148	1,550	10.5	7

== Professional career ==
Pre-draft measurables
Height	Weight	Arm length	Hand span	40-yard dash	10-yard split	20-yard split	20-yard shuttle	Three-cone drill	Vertical jump	Broad jump	Bench press
5 ft 10 7/8 in (1.80 m)	185 lb (84 kg)	31 1/2 in (0.80 m)	9 in (0.23 m)	4.52 s	1.62 s	2.51 s	4.23 s	7.32 s	33.5 in (0.85 m)	10 ft 0 in (3.05 m)	13 reps
All values from Pro Day

=== Cincinnati Bengals ===
Lassiter went undrafted in the 2022 NFL draft. He signed with the Cincinnati Bengals on May 13, 2022. He was released during final roster cuts on August 30, but re–signed to the team's practice squad the following day. He was elevated to the active roster on November 26, 2022 for the Week 12 game against the Tennessee Titans.

Lassiter signed a reserve/future contract with the Bengals on January 31, 2023. He was waived on August 29, 2023, and signed to the practice squad the following day. He was activated via a standard elevation on October 7, 2023 for the Bengals Week 5 game against the Arizona Cardinals. The game was his only his second career NFL game, coming against the team that his father, Kwamie Lassiter, played 8 seasons for. In the game he recorded his first career reception, which was a 2-yard catch. He reverted back to the practice squad the day after the game.

The Bengals signed Lassiter to a reserve/future contract on January 8, 2024. On August 23, Lassiter was released by the Bengals.

=== Memphis Showboats ===
On December 5, 2024, Lassiter signed with the Memphis Showboats of the United Football League (UFL).

=== Kansas City Chiefs ===
On July 30, 2025, Lassiter signed with the Kansas City Chiefs.

=== Louisville Kings ===
On January 13, 2026, Lassiter was selected by the Louisville Kings in the 2026 UFL Draft. He was released on March 19.

== Personal life ==
Lassiter is named after his father Kwamie, who also played at Kansas, and played 10 seasons in the NFL, primarily for the Cardinals. He has two younger brothers in college football: Kwinton (Kansas) and Darius (BYU). His sister Darian was a member of the Dallas Cowboys Cheerleaders.
