= Cross Roads, Henderson County, Texas =

- Unincorporated community
- Location within Texas Location within the United States
- Coordinates: 32°02′57″N 95°58′03″W
- Country: United States
- State: Texas
- County: Henderson
- Time zone: UTC-6 (Central (CST))
  - Summer (DST): UTC-5 (CDT)
- Area codes: 903, 430

Cross Roads is an unincorporated community in southwestern Henderson County, Texas, United States.

== History ==
Cross Roads is at the junction of Farm roads 59 and 3441 in southwestern Henderson County. The town was founded in 1846 by the Reverend Hezekiah Mitcham and his wife Mary Clarke Mitcham, who had come from Marengo County, Alabama, according to that county's 1830 Census. The earliest settlement was called Science Hill. In 1885, the Wildcat post office was opened at the site with George B. Thompson as postmaster. By 1892, the community had three cotton gins, a general store, and several other establishments, but the Wildcat post office closed in 1905. The community was also referred to as Thompson's Mill because of a water-powered mill built in 1871 by D. M. Thompson on Wildcat Creek. Cross Roads, as a named community, traces its origins to the early 1890s. A brush-arbor camp meeting of Baptists was held at the point where the road from Athens to Wildcat Ferry and the road from Malakoff to Palestine intersected, and gave the location the name "Cross Roads." The first permanent building in the area was a church, which was erected after the Union-Center school moved from Thompson's Mill to the Cross Roads location. In 1908, a one-room school was erected; it was taught by Sam Holland, who later became district judge of Henderson County. In the early part of the twentieth century numerous gins, gristmills, and other businesses supportive of an agricultural community thrived at Cross Roads. There was a post office there until World War I, and a courthouse was built to house the justice of the peace court.

In the mid-1920s, as a result of the merger of various smaller schools in the area, the Cross Roads Consolidated School was established. From the 1920s through the end of World War II, the school was expanded and upgraded. The WPA made several improvements to the school facility, and in the late 1940s the Cross Roads Independent School District was formed as the consolidation of eight common school districts in the general vicinity. After a disastrous fire in 1953, much of the school plant was rebuilt, except for the high school which was closed, with students sent to nearby districts for high school education. In the late 1970s, the district began adding high school grades, culminating in 1980 with the district's first high school graduating class since 1953.

Cotton and ranching were the most important agricultural activities in the district, particularly in the Trinity River bottom, but other areas produced various truck crops and fruit. Discoveries of oil and gas in the 1940s and 1950s contributed to a brief resurgence. A population of 135 was reported in 1988, 1990, and 2000.
