= East Texas Baptist Tigers football =

College football team

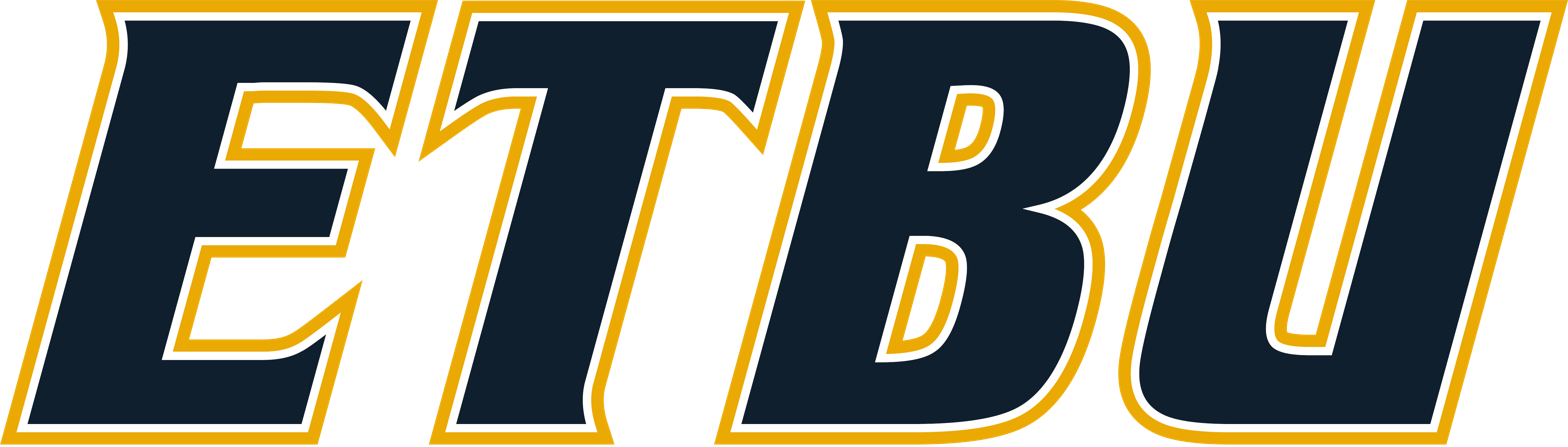
- First season: 1924; 102 years ago
- Athletic director: Ryan Erwin
- Head coach: Calvin Ruzicka; 3rd season, 14–15 (.483)
- Location: Marshall, Texas
- Stadium: Ornelas Stadium (capacity: 2,046)
- NCAA division: Division III
- Conference: ASC
- Colors: Navy blue and gold
- All-time record: 151–169–6 (.472)

Conference championships
- 2
- Rivalries: Louisiana Christian (Battle for the Border Claw)
- Mascot: Tigers
- Website: goetbutigers.com

The East Texas Baptist Tigers football team represents East Texas Baptist University in college football at the NCAA Division III level. The Tigers are members of the American Southwest Conference (ASC), fielding its team in the ASC since 2000. The Tigers play their home games at Ornelas Stadium in Marshall, Texas.

Their head coach is Calvin Ruzicka, who took over the position for the 2023 season.

== Conference affiliations ==
- Independent (1924; 1926; 1934–1938; 1947–1950)
- American Southwest Conference (2000–present)

== Championships ==
=== Conference championships ===
East Texas Baptist claims 2 conference titles, the most recent of which came in 2015.

Year	Conference	Overall Record	Conference Record	Coach
2003†	American Southwest Conference	9–3	8–1	Ralph Harris
2015†	American Southwest Conference	7–3	4–1	Joshua Eargle

† Co-champions

== NCAA Division III playoff games ==
The Tigers have appeared in the Division III playoffs one time with an overall record of 1–1.

Season	Coach	Playoff	Opponent	Result
2003	Ralph Harris	First round Second round	Trinity (TX); Lycoming	W 42–41; L 7–13

== List of head coaches ==
=== Key ===
Key to symbols in coaches list
General		Overall		Conference		Postseason (Note: Although the first Rose Bowl Game was played in 1902, it has been continuously played since the 1916 game, and is recognized as the oldest bowl game by the NCAA. "—" indicates any season prior to 1916 when postseason games were not played.)	
No.	Order of coaches (Note: A running total of the number of head coaches, with coaches who served separate tenures being counted only once. Interim head coaches are represented with "Int" and are not counted in the running total. "—" indicates the team played but either without a coach or no coach is on record. "X" indicates an interim year without play.)	GC	Games coached	CW	Conference wins	PW	Postseason wins
DC	Division championships	OW	Overall wins	CL	Conference losses	PL	Postseason losses
CC	Conference championships	OL	Overall losses	CT	Conference ties	PT	Postseason ties
NC	National championships	OT	Overall ties (Note: Overtime rules in college football were introduced in 1996, making ties impossible in the period since.)	C%	Conference winning percentage		
†	Elected to the College Football Hall of Fame	O%	Overall winning percentage (Note: When computing the win–loss percentage, a tie counts as half a win and half a loss.)				

=== Coaches ===
List of head football coaches showing season(s) coached, overall records, conference records, postseason records, championships and selected awards
No.	Name	Season(s)	GC	OW	OL	OT	O%	CW	CL	CT	C%	PW	PL	PT	DC	CC	NC	Awards
1	unknown	1924; 1926; 1934–1938; 1947–1950	93	33	54	6	0.387	–	–	–	–	–	–	–	–	–	–	–
2	Ralph Harris	2000–2006	72	35	37	0	0.486	32	30	0	0.516	1	1	0	–	1	–	–
3	Mark Sartain	2007–2012	60	26	34	0	0.433	23	24	0	0.489	–	–	–	–	–	–	–
4	Joshua Eargle	2013–2015	30	14	16	0	0.467	6	10	0	0.375	–	–	–	–	1	–	ASC Coach of the Year (2015)
5	Scotty Walden	2016	10	7	3	0	0.700	3	3	0	0.500	–	–	–	–	–	–	–
6	Scott Highsmith	2017	10	7	3	0	0.700	6	3	0	0.667	–	–	–	–	–	–	–
7	Brian Mayper	2018–2022	45	25	20	0	0.556	23	16	0	0.590	–	–	–	–	–	–	–
8	Calvin Ruzicka	2023–present	29	14	15	0	0.483	5	13	0	0.278	–	–	–	–	–	–	–

== Year-by-year results ==
National champions	Conference champions	Bowl game berth	Playoff berth

Season	Year	Head coach	Association	Division	Conference	Record							Postseason	Final ranking
Season	Year	Head coach	Association	Division	Conference	Overall			Conference				Postseason	Final ranking
Season	Year	Head coach	Association	Division	Conference	Win	Loss	Tie	Finish	Win	Loss	Tie	Postseason	Final ranking
East Texas Baptist Tigers
1924	1924	unknown	NCAA	—	—	3	2	0					—	—
No team in 1925
1926	1926	unknown	NCAA	—	—	3	4	0					—	—
No team from 1927–1933
1934	1934	unknown	NCAA	—	—	4	4	1					—	—
1935	1935	unknown	NCAA	—	—	8	2	2					—	—
1936	1936	unknown	NCAA	—	—	1	4	0					—	—
1937	1937	unknown	NCAA	—	—	3	6	0					—	—
1938	1938	unknown	NCAA	—	—	2	5	0					—	—
No team from 1939–1946
1947	1947	unknown	NCAA	—	—	0	8	2					—	—
1948	1948	unknown	NCAA	—	—	3	7	0					—	—
1949	1949	unknown	NCAA	—	—	4	5	1					—	—
1950	1950	unknown	NCAA	—	—	2	7	0					—	—
No team from 1951–1999
2000	2000	Ralph Harris	NCAA	Division III	ASC	2	8	0	T–9th	1	8	0	—	—
2001	2001	Ralph Harris	NCAA	Division III	ASC	5	5	0	5th	4	5	0	—	—
2002	2002	Ralph Harris	NCAA	Division III	ASC	6	4	0	4th	6	3	0	—	—
2003	2003	Ralph Harris	NCAA	Division III	ASC	9	3	0	1st	8	1	0	L NCAA Division III Second Round	14
2004	2004	Ralph Harris	NCAA	Division III	ASC	4	6	0	T–5th	4	5	0	—	—
2005	2005	Ralph Harris	NCAA	Division III	ASC	6	4	0	4th	6	3	0	—	—
2006	2006	Ralph Harris	NCAA	Division III	ASC	3	7	0	T–5th	3	5	0	—	—
2007	2007	Mark Sartain	NCAA	Division III	ASC	5	5	0	4th	5	3	0	—	—
2008	2008	Mark Sartain	NCAA	Division III	ASC	5	5	0	T–3rd	5	3	0	—	—
2009	2009	Mark Sartain	NCAA	Division III	ASC	3	7	0	6th	3	5	0	—	—
2010	2010	Mark Sartain	NCAA	Division III	ASC	5	5	0	T–4th	4	4	0	—	—
2011	2011	Mark Sartain	NCAA	Division III	ASC	5	5	0	T–4th	4	4	0	—	—
2012	2012	Mark Sartain	NCAA	Division III	ASC	3	7	0	T–5th	2	5	0	—	—
2013	2013	Joshua Eargle	NCAA	Division III	ASC	3	7	0	T–6th	1	5	0	—	—
2014	2014	Joshua Eargle	NCAA	Division III	ASC	4	6	0	T–4th	1	4	0	—	—
2015	2015	Joshua Eargle	NCAA	Division III	ASC	7	3	0	1st	4	1	0	ASC tri-champion	—
2016	2016	Scotty Walden	NCAA	Division III	ASC	7	3	0	4th	3	3	0	—	—
2017	2017	Scott Highsmith	NCAA	Division III	ASC	7	3	0	3rd	6	3	0	—	—
2018	2018	Brian Mayper	NCAA	Division III	ASC	6	4	0	T–3rd	6	3	0	—	—
2019	2019	Brian Mayper	NCAA	Division III	ASC	6	4	0	4th	6	3	0	—	—
2020–21	2020–21	Brian Mayper	NCAA	Division III	ASC	3	2	0	3rd	3	1	0	—	—
2021	2021	Brian Mayper	NCAA	Division III	ASC	5	5	0	T–5th	4	5	0	—	—
2022	2022	Brian Mayper	NCAA	Division III	ASC	5	5	0	T–4th	4	4	0	—	—
2023	2023	Calvin Ruzicka	NCAA	Division III	ASC	5	5	0	T–3rd	3	3	0	—	—
2024	2024	Calvin Ruzicka	NCAA	Division III	ASC	5	4	0	3rd	2	4	0	—	—
2025	2025	Calvin Ruzicka	NCAA	Division III	ASC	4	6	0	4th	0	6	0	—	—
