= Cross Roads Independent School District =

School district in Texas

Location
- Cross Roads, TX ESC Region 7 USA

District information
- Type: Public
- Motto: Dedicated to Youth
- Grades: Pre-K through 12
- Superintendent: Richard Tedder

Students and staff
- Athletic conference: UIL Class AA
- Colors: Green and White

Other information
- Mascot: Bobcat
- Website: Cross Roads ISD

Cross Roads Independent School District is a public school district based in the community of Cross Roads, Texas (USA) that serves students in southwest Henderson County.

In 2009, the school district was rated "academically acceptable" by the Texas Education Agency.

During the 2017-2018 school year, there were 545 students enrolled at Cross Roads ISD.

== History ==
Cross Roads ISD started in 1908 as a one-room schoolhouse. The district continued to serve all students in the area until 1953, when a fire destroyed the main building. At that time, the district elected to serve only students through 8th grade, while high school students transferred to schools in either Athens, Cayuga, or Malakoff.

The arrangement continued until 1978-1979, when over this period Cross Roads ISD began to add the high school grades, making the class of 1980 the first to graduate from the district since 1953.

== Schools ==
- Cross Roads High School (Grades 9-12)
- Cross Roads Junior High (Grades 6-8)
- Cross Roads Elementary (Grades PK-5)
