= Emmett Jones =

American football coach

Current position
- Title: Wide receivers coach & passing game coordinator
- Team: Oklahoma
- Conference: SEC
- Annual salary: $664,000

Playing career
- 1993–1994: Texas Tech
- 1995-1996: North Texas
- Position: Wide receiver

Coaching career (HC unless noted)
- 2001–2004: Seagoville HS (TX) (assistant)
- 2005: Dallas Lincoln HS (TX) (assistant)
- 2006–2011: Skyline HS (TX) (OC)
- 2012–2014: South Oak Cliff HS (TX)
- 2015: Texas Tech (player dev.)
- 2016–2018: Texas Tech (WR)
- 2019: Kansas (WR)
- 2020–2021: Kansas (WR/PGC)
- 2022: Texas Tech (WR/PGC)
- 2023–present: Oklahoma (WR/PGC)

Head coaching record
- Overall: 30–8

Emmett Jones is an American football coach who is the wide receivers coach and passing game coordinator at the University of Oklahoma. He was previously the wide receivers coach for the Kansas Jayhawks football and Texas Tech football. Jones was named wide receivers coach on December 6, 2021, joining Joey McGuire in his first season as head coach. Jones left Texas Tech football and joined the Oklahoma Sooners football on January 10, 2023.

== Coaching career ==
=== High school ===
Jones began his coaching career at his alma mater, Seagoville High School in 2001 where he stayed until 2004. In 2005 he became a part of the staff at Dallas's Lincoln High School. In 2006 Jones went to work at Dallas's Skyline High School, where he stayed for seven seasons. He began his tenure there as the team's wide receivers coach before being promoted to offensive coordinator. He then had his first head coaching opportunity at South Oak Cliff High School. He spent three seasons as the team’s head coach. Under his tutelage the Golden Bears had the record of 30–8, advancing deep in the Class 4A and 5A playoffs in each of his three seasons.

=== Texas Tech (first stint) ===
Jones joined the college coaching ranks at Texas Tech in 2015 as the Director of Player Development. Kliff Kingsbury promoted him to wide receivers coach in 2016 a position he held until 2018.

=== Kansas ===
From 2019 Jones was the wide receivers coach at Kansas before getting promoted to passing game coordinator for the 2020 and 2021 season. After Les Miles resigned, Jones served as Kansas's interim head coach throughout its 2021 spring practices up until Lance Leipold was hired.

=== Texas Tech (second stint) ===
In December 2021 Jones was hired at Texas Tech as the team’s passing game coordinator and wide receivers coach.

== Personal life ==
He and his wife, Marlo, are the parents of a daughter, Emily, and a son, Emmett III Sisters are Crystal Jones, Audrey Jones.
