= Kyron Johnson =

American football player (born 1998)

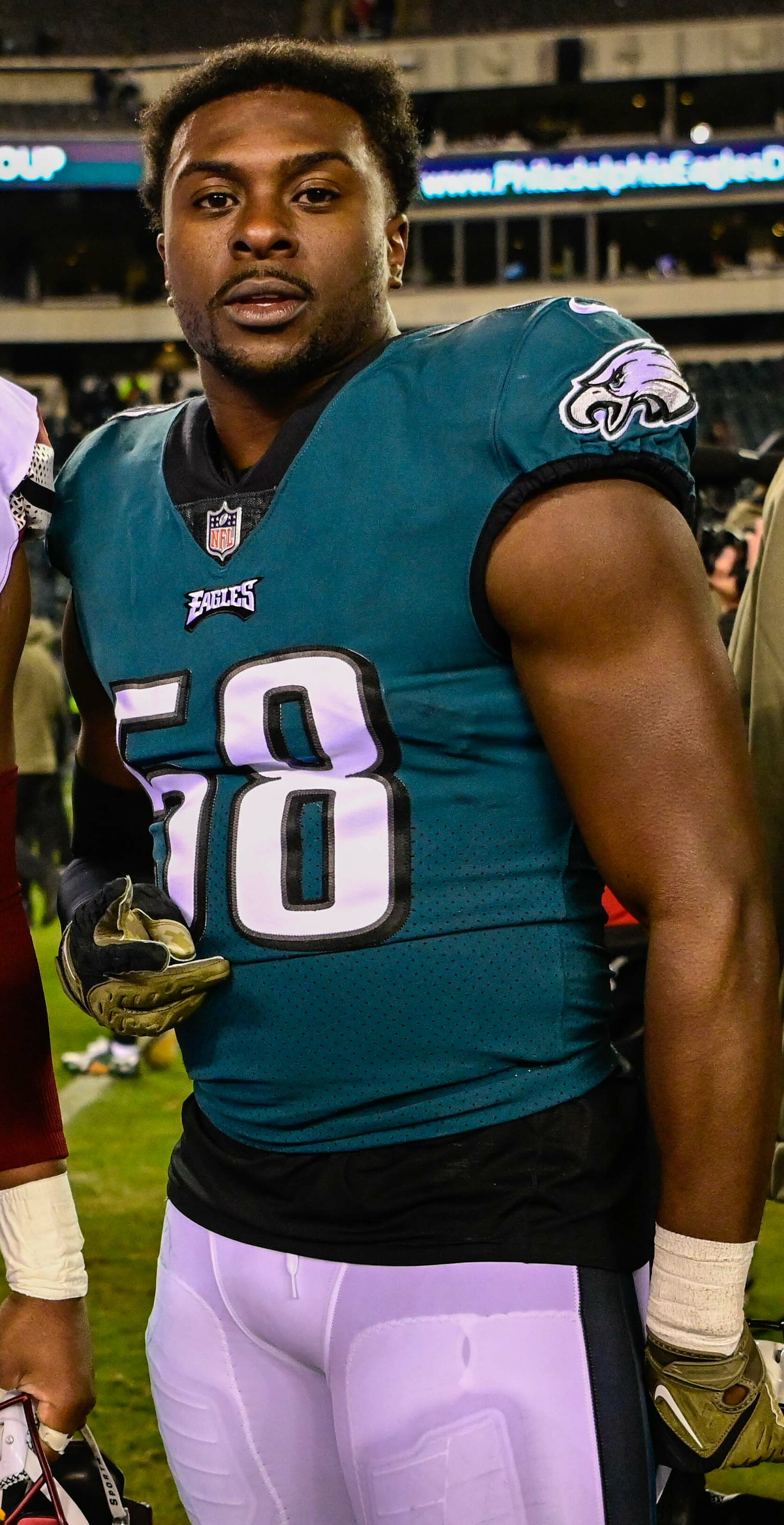
- Johnson with the Philadelphia Eagles in 2022

Ottawa Redblacks
- Position: Linebacker
- Roster status: Practice roster

Personal information
- Born: July 24, 1998 (age 28); Arlington, Texas, U.S.
- Listed height: 6 ft 0 in (1.83 m)
- Listed weight: 235 lb (107 kg)

Career information
- High school: Lamar (Arlington)
- College: Kansas (2017–2021)
- NFL draft: 2022: 6th round, 181st overall pick

Career history
- Philadelphia Eagles (2022–2023); Pittsburgh Steelers (2023); Tennessee Titans (2024); DC Defenders (2026); Ottawa Redblacks (2026–present)*
- * Offseason or practice squad member only

Awards and highlights
- Second-team All-Big 12 (2021)

Career NFL statistics as of 2023
- Total tackles: 8
- Stats at Pro Football Reference

Kyron Johnson (born July 24, 1998) is an American professional football linebacker for the Ottawa Redblacks of the Canadian Football League (CFL).. He played college football for the Kansas Jayhawks and was selected by the Philadelphia Eagles in the sixth round of the 2022 NFL draft.

== Early life ==
Johnson attended Lamar High School in Arlington, Texas. In a game against North Crowley his senior year, he was taken off the field on a stretcher. Johnson received offers from Kansas and SMU. He committed to Kansas on June 2, 2016.

== College career ==
As a freshman, Johnson primarily played special teams, recording 17 tackles playing in 8 games. As a sophomore, he became a starter and made his first career start against Nicholls. Following the COVID-19 pandemic shortened 2020 season, Johnson returned for a 5th season due to the NCAA granting an extra year of eligibility. He was named second-team All-Big 12 his super-senior year in 2021.

=== College statistics ===
Year	Team	GP	Sacks	Solo	Total	TFL
2017	Kansas	8	0	12	15	0
2018	Kansas	10	2	12	18	4
2019	Kansas	12	1	36	55	5.5
2020	Kansas	9	3	27	42	4.5
2021	Kansas	12	6.5	41	63	8.5
Total		51	12.5	128	193	22.5

== Professional career ==
Pre-draft measurables
Height	Weight	Arm length	Hand span	40-yard dash	10-yard split	20-yard split	20-yard shuttle	Three-cone drill	Vertical jump	Broad jump	Bench press
6 ft 0 3/8 in (1.84 m)	231 lb (105 kg)	32 1/2 in (0.83 m)	9 in (0.23 m)	4.40 s	1.50 s	2.41 s	4.38 s	6.98 s	39 1/2 in (1.00 m)	10 ft 0 in (3.05 m)	16 reps
All values from Kansas Pro Day

=== Philadelphia Eagles ===
Johnson was drafted by the Philadelphia Eagles in the sixth round (181st overall) of the 2022 NFL draft.

On August 29, 2023, Johnson was waived by the Eagles and re-signed to the practice squad. On October 3, 2023, the Eagles released Johnson.

=== Pittsburgh Steelers ===
On October 10, 2023, Johnson was signed to the practice squad of the Pittsburgh Steelers. He was signed to the active roster on December 22. He was waived on August 27, 2024.

=== Tennessee Titans ===
On September 11, 2024, Johnson was signed to the Tennessee Titans practice squad. He signed a reserve/future contract on January 6, 2025.

On May 7, 2025, Johnson was waived/injured by the Titans and reverted to the injured reserve the following day. He was then released with an injury settlement on May 13.

=== DC Defenders ===
On January 14, 2026, Johnson was selected by the DC Defenders of the United Football League (UFL). He was released on March 19. He re-signed on April 28. He was released again on June 2.

=== Ottawa Redblacks ===
On September 16, 2026, Johnson signed with the Ottawa Redblacks practice roster of the Canadian Football League (CFL).
