= Kody Case =

American gridiron football player (born 1998)

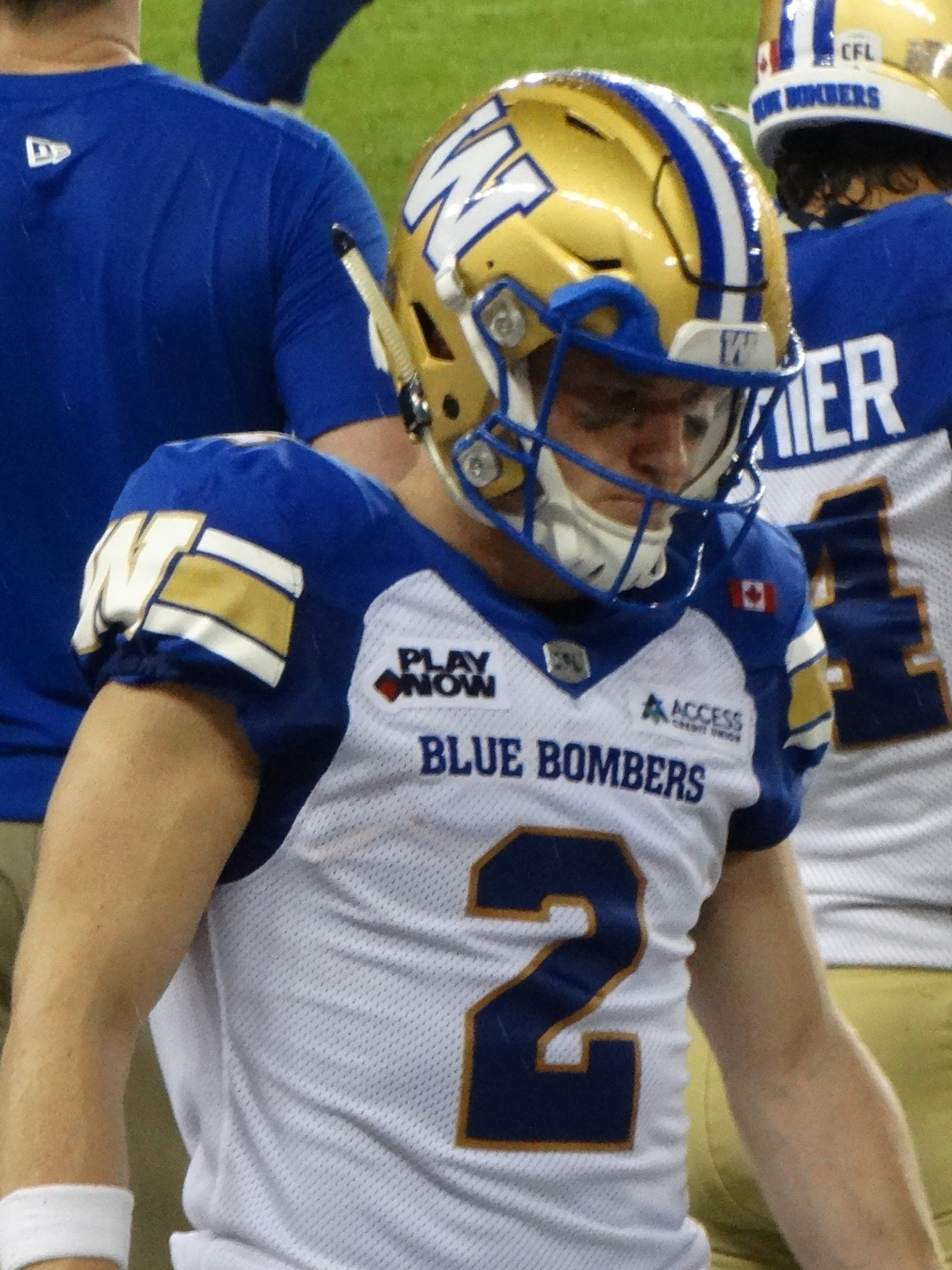
- Case with the Winnipeg Blue Bombers in 2025

Profile
- Positions: Wide receiver, return specialist

Personal information
- Born: September 11, 1998 (age 28); Lake City, Iowa, U.S.
- Listed height: 5 ft 10 in (1.78 m)
- Listed weight: 182 lb (83 kg)

Career information
- High school: South Central Calhoun (Lake City)
- College: South Dakota (2017–2021); Illinois (2022)
- NFL draft: 2023: undrafted

Career history
- 2023: Indianapolis Colts*
- 2024–2025: Winnipeg Blue Bombers
- * Offseason or practice squad member only
- Stats at CFL.ca

Kody Case (born September 11, 1998) is an American professional football wide receiver and return specialist. He most recently played for the Winnipeg Blue Bombers of the Canadian Football League (CFL). He played college football at South Dakota and Illinois. He has also been a member of the Indianapolis Colts of the National Football League (NFL).

== Early life ==
Case played high school football at South Central Calhoun High School in Lake City, Iowa as a wide receiver, running back, and defensive back. He recorded high school totals of 120 receptions for 2,205 yards and 32 touchdowns, and 142 carries for 1,432 yards and 18 touchdowns. He also totaled 147 tackles and 13 interceptions on defense. Case was a two-time all-state selection. He participated in basketball and track in high school as well.

== College career ==
=== South Dakota ===
Case first played college football for the South Dakota Coyotes from 2017 to 2021. He set a South Dakota freshman record with five receiving touchdowns in 2017. In the 2019 season opener, he tied the South Dakota single-game record for receptions with 11 receptions for 144 yards and two touchdowns. Overall, Case caught 82 passes for 1,157 yards and nine touchdowns during his tenure at South Dakota. He was medically redshirted in 2018 and the 2020 season was shortened due to the COVID-19 pandemic. He played with future Blue Bombers teammate Chris Streveler while at South Dakota.

=== Illinois ===
Case transferred to play for the Illinois Fighting Illini in 2022. He played in four games during the 2022 season, primary on specials teams, and did not record any receptions.

== Professional career ==
Pre-draft measurables
Height	Weight	Arm length	Hand span	40-yard dash	10-yard split	20-yard split	20-yard shuttle	Three-cone drill	Vertical jump	Broad jump	Bench press
5 ft 9 3/5 in (1.77 m)	182 lb (83 kg)	29 1/2 in (0.75 m)	9 1/4 in (0.23 m)	4.44 s	1.58 s	2.62 s	4.18 s	6.91 s	35.5 in (0.90 m)	10 ft 7 in (3.23 m)	16 reps
All values from Pro Day

=== Indianapolis Colts ===
Case signed with the Indianapolis Colts of the National Football League (NFL) on May 8, 2023 after going undrafted in the 2023 NFL draft. He was waived on August 27, 2023.

=== Winnipeg Blue Bombers ===
Case signed with the Winnipeg Blue Bombers of the Canadian Football League (CFL) on January 18, 2024. He was released on May 27, and later signed to the team's practice roster on June 30. He was promoted to the active roster on July 15, 2024, mainly to serve as a return specialist. He played in three games in his rookie year where he had one catch for five yards, 24 punt returns for 252 yards, and six kickoff returns for 151 yards. Case became a free agent when his contract expired on February 10, 2026.
