= Cross Roads High School =

Coordinates: 32.051967°N 95.966647°W

Location
- 14434 Hwy 59; Malakoff, Texas 75148-9801; United States

Information
- School type: Public high school
- School district: Cross Roads Independent School District
- Principal: Thomas Flinchum
- Teaching staff: 19.94 (on an FTE basis)
- Grades: 9-12
- Enrollment: 194 (2023-24)
- Student to teacher ratio: 9.73
- Colors: Green & White
- Athletics conference: UIL Class 2A
- Mascot: Bobcat
- Website: Cross Roads High School

Cross Roads High School is a 2A public high school located in unincorporated Cross Roads about eight miles south of Malakoff, Texas, United States. The school is often referred to as Malakoff Cross Roads. It is part of the Cross Roads Independent School District located in southern Henderson County. In 2011, the school was rated "Academically Acceptable" by the Texas Education Agency.

== Athletics ==
The Cross Roads Bobcats compete in the following sports:

Cross Country, Volleyball, Football, Basketball, Golf, Track, Softball & Baseball
