= Texas Christian Academy =

Location
- 4600 Sanger Avenue; Waco, Texas 76710; United States
- Coordinates: 31.533480°N 97.175922°W

Information
- Type: Private school
- Established: 2000
- Closed: 2017
- Principal: Gary Bender
- Faculty: 19
- Grades: K-12
- Enrollment: 96 (2013-2014)
- Color
- Team name: Stars
- Website: Official Website

Texas Christian Academy (TCA) was a private college preparatory school in Waco, Texas. The school mascot was the Star.

== History ==
TCA was created in 2000 from the merger of Waco Christian School and Waco Covenant Academy.

In 2012, TCA merged with Parkview Christian Academy in Waco, moving from 4600 Sanger Ave. to the Parkview campus at 1100 Lake Shore Drive, but retaining the TCA name. The combined school's total enrollment was approximately 230. In 2013, the TCA-Parkview merger dissolved and the two schools became separate organizations again.

Texas Christian Academy closed in 2017.

== Curriculum ==
The student-teacher ratio at TCA was 12:1 with the class size range from 6-22. Honors and Advanced Placement classes were available as well as dual credit classes offered through McLennan Community College in Waco. TCA had been accredited by the Association of Christian Schools International and TABS/ACTABS.
