= Joshua Eargle =

American football player and coach (born 1979)

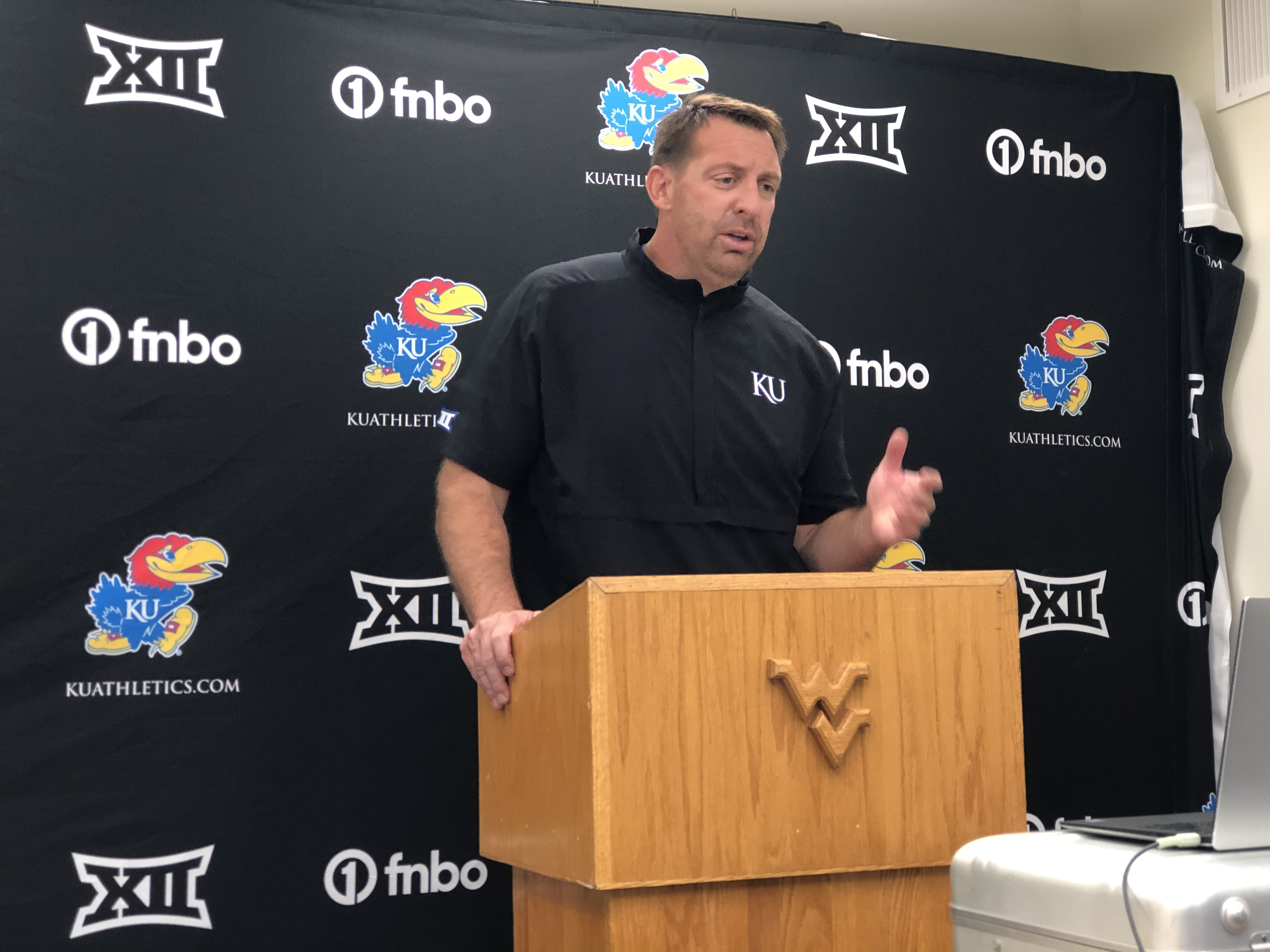
- Eargle as interim head coach for Kansas, October 17, 2020

Current position
- Title: Head coach
- Team: Texas A&M–Texarkana
- Conference: LSC
- Record: 0–0

Biographical details
- Born: January 6, 1979 (age 47); Waco, Texas, U.S.

Playing career
- 1997–2001: Memphis
- Positions: Defensive lineman, offensive guard

Coaching career (HC unless noted)
- 2003–2004: Southern Miss (GA)
- 2005: Ouachita Baptist (OL/RC)
- 2006: Southern Miss (QC)
- 2007–2008: Nicholls State (OL/RC)
- 2009: LSU (QC)
- 2010: Arkansas–Monticello (OC)
- 2011: Hallsville HS (TX) (DC)
- 2012: Southeastern Oklahoma State (DC)
- 2013–2015: East Texas Baptist
- 2016–2018: Austin Peay (OC)
- 2019: Kansas (senior analyst)
- 2020: Kansas (TE/RC)
- 2021: Memphis (consultant)
- 2022: FIU (TE)
- 2023–2024: FIU (deputy HC / OL)
- 2025: UTEP (RGC/TE)
- 2027–present: Texas A&M–Texarkana

Head coaching record
- Overall: 14–16

Accomplishments and honors

Championships
- 1 ASC (2015)

Awards
- ASC Coach of the Year (2015)

Joshua King Eargle (born January 6, 1979) is an American football coach and former player. He is the head football coach at Texas A&M University–Texarkana. The Texas A&M–Texarkana Eagles football will begin play in 2027. Eargle served as the head football coach at East Texas Baptist University (ETBU) from 2013 to 2015, compiling a record of 14–16. In 2015, he led his East Texas Baptist team to an American Southwest Conference (ASC) championship, and was named ASC Coach of the Year.

== Early life and playing career ==
Eargle was born in Waco, Texas and grew up in Brownwood, Texas. He played football at Brownwood High School before transferring to Sulphur Springs High School in Sulphur Springs, Texas for his senior year in 1996. During his senior year he played both offensive guard and defensive tackle and was named to the Texas Sportswriters 4A All-State team, Defensive Player of the Year in District 15-4A and All-District in district 15-4A as a defensive tackle. He was credited with 69 total tackles and two pass interceptions for touchdowns during his senior year.

Eargle was recruited by Rip Scherer, then head football coach at the University of Memphis and signed with the Tigers after offers from Arkansas and Texas. As a Memphis Tiger, Eargle played on the defensive line before being moved to offensive guard. At Memphis, Eargle won the inaugural Top Tiger Award given by head coach Tommy West to the player who battled back from adversity or overcame difficult circumstances to return to the field.

== Coaching career ==
Eargle started his coaching career as a graduate assistant at the University of Southern Mississippi under head coach Jeff Bower. In his first year as a graduate assistant in 2003, he was part of Southern Miss' 2003 Conference USA championship and the team's bowl bid to the 2003 Liberty Bowl. In 2005, Eargle became the offensive line coach at Ouachita Baptist University before returning to Southern Mississippi as an assistant offensive line coach in 2006. From 2007 to 2008, Eargle was offensive line coach and recruiting coordinator at Nicholls State University.

In 2009, Eargle took a quality control position at LSU under head coach Les Miles, while working directly under offensive line coach, Greg Studrawa. Eargle was hired for his first coordinator position when he was named offensive coordinator at the University of Arkansas at Monticello in 2010. In 2011, he took a position as defensive coordinator at Hallsville High School in East Texas. In 2012, Eargle became defensive coordinator at Southeastern Oklahoma State University. The Savage Storm's defense finished the season ranked 11th in pass defense and 29th overall in Division II.

Eargle was named head football coach at East Texas Baptist University on January 22, 2013. At East Texas Baptist, he won the American Southwest Conference championship in 2015 and was named the ASC Coach of the Year. He led his 2015 team to a 7–3 overall record, a 4–1 record in the ASC and the team received their first national ranking (#23 D3football.com poll) since 2004. At ETBU, Eargle coached 5 All-Americans and 20 All-Conference players. In total, ETBU established 50+ combined individual or team season records during Eargle's three seasons as head coach.

In 2016, Eargle became the run game coordinator and offensive line coach at Austin Peay State University. In 2017, he helped lead one of the biggest turnarounds in college football. Prior to the 2017 season, the Austin Peay Governors had just one win in four seasons. In 2017, the Governors finished 8–1 in Division I FCS play, 8–4 overall and finished with seven Ohio Valley Conference (OVC) wins. The running attack headed by Eargle ranked sixth in Division I FCS, averaging 258.8 rushing yards a game.

Prior to the Austin Peay vs. Morehead State game on September 15, 2018, Eargle was named offensive coordinator. In his first game as offensive coordinator for Austin Peay, Eargle's offense set the OVC record for most points scored against a Division I FCS opponent in the school's 78–40 victory over Morehead State. During the remainder of the 2018 season, Austin Peay continued to break offensive records. For the season, the Governors set school records in yards per game (419), points scored (340), touchdowns scored (47), points per game (30.9), yards per play (6.19) and yards per rush (5.39). The Governors finished as the No. 16 rushing offense in Division I FCS and No. 17 in the nation in rushing yards per carry (5.39), averaging 237.5 yards per game. Under Eargle, Austin Peay also finished No. 13 nationally in passing yards per completion (15.1). Under his tutelage, Kentell Williams earned First-Team All-OVC recognition and Third Team All-America honors, and offensive linemen Byron Glass and Ethan Self were named Second-Team All-OVC. Two of Eargle’s pupils, left tackle Kyle Anderton and left guard Ryan Rockensuess, were named Second-Team All-OVC at the end of the 2017 season for their work in paving the top rushing attack in school history. Eargle coached three consensus All-America honorees – Kordell Jackson (2020), DeAngelo Wilson (2020), Johnathon Edwards (2021). Bucky Williams was an American Football Coaches Association Second Team All-American and a HERO Sports Sophomore All-American in 2020. Williams signed with the L.A. Chargers as an undrafted free agent in 2024. In 2018, Eargle also served as interim head coach at Austin Peay after the departure of head coach Will Healy.

For the 2019 season, Eargle served as senior analyst at the University of Kansas. On February 2, 2020, Kansas head football coach Les Miles announced that Eargle was promoted to tight ends coach and will also serve as the Jayhawks recruiting coordinator. He served as interim head coach for the Kansas at West Virginia game during the 2020 season after Miles tested positive for COVID-19.

Following Miles' firing, he spent the 2021 season as a senior offensive consultant on Ryan Silverfield's staff at Memphis.

In January 2022, it was reported that Eargle would follow Mike MacIntyre to FIU as the tight ends coach. Following the 2022 season, Eargle was elevated to Deputy Head Coach and took over coaching the Offensive Line. In Conference USA, the Panthers ranked no. 1 in the least sacks allowed (17) and sacks allowed per game (1.4). The Panthers' scoring offense ranked third in CUSA at 26.3 points per game. Prior to being elevated, he also directed the tight ends in 2022 including tight end Rivaldo Fairweather, who signed with the Dallas Cowboys in April 2025.

Eargle returned back to the state of Texas in 2025 after taking the tight ends and run game coordinator role at the University of Texas at El Paso (UTEP). In December 2025, he was hired the first head coach of the newly-formed football program at Texas A&M University–Texarkana, which will begin play in 2027.

== Personal life ==
Eargle met his wife, Kristen, while in college at the University of Memphis. After completing her journalism degree at Memphis, Kristen got her start in TV sports journalism as a sports producer and fill-in reporter at WVUE Fox 8 in New Orleans. She later became a sports reporter and anchor for WBRZ in Baton Rouge, Louisiana while also working as a sideline reporter for WHNO and Cox Sports Television in New Orleans. During Joshua's tenure at ETBU in Texas, Kristen was hired by KLTV to be a morning show anchor and launched Good Morning East Texas Weekend.

Following his 2018 season at Austin Peay, Eargle won a national online public vote for his work in raising awareness for his young daughter Landrey's fight against the life-threatening illnesses that she's been battling her entire life. The Rare Disease Champion award is presented by Uplifting Athletes to "a leader in the world of college football who has realized his or her potential to make a positive and lasting impact on the rare disease community."

== Head coaching record ==
| Year | Team | Overall | Conference | Standing | Bowl/playoffs |
|---|---|---|---|---|---|
East Texas Baptist Tigers (American Southwest Conference) (2013–2015)
| 2013 | East Texas Baptist | 3–7 | 1–5 | T–5th | |
| 2014 | East Texas Baptist | 4–6 | 1–4 | T–4th | |
| 2015 | East Texas Baptist | 7–3 | 4–1 | T–1st | |
| East Texas Baptist: | | 14–16 | 6–10 | | |
| Total: | | 14–16 | | | |
National championship Conference title Conference division title or championship game berth
