= 1960 United States presidential election in Texas =

- November 8, 1960

Nominee	John F. Kennedy	Richard Nixon
Party	Democratic	Republican
Home state	Massachusetts	California
Running mate	Lyndon B. Johnson	Henry Cabot Lodge Jr.
Electoral vote	24	0
Popular vote	1,167,567	1,121,310
Percentage	50.52%	48.52%

Kennedy
40–50%
50–60%
60–70%
70–80%
80–90%
90–100%
Nixon
40–50%
50–60%
60–70%
70–80%
President before election
Dwight D. Eisenhower
Republican
Elected President
John F. Kennedy
Democratic

The 1960 United States presidential election in Texas was held on November 8, 1960, as part of the 1960 United States presidential election. The Democratic Party candidate John F. Kennedy, narrowly won the state of Texas with 50.52 percent of the vote to the Republican candidate Vice President Richard Nixon's 48.52%, a margin of two percent, giving him the state's 24 electoral votes. Despite the presence of U.S. Senator Lyndon B. Johnson on the Democratic ticket (as well as Johnson winning in a landslide in the concurrent Senate election), the result made Texas the tenth closest state in the election. Nixon's strong performance in the Dallas–Fort Worth Metroplex, Harris County, the Panhandle, and the Hill Country kept the race close.

== Background ==
The weakening of the Democratic control over the Solid South allowed Republicans to win Texas in the 1952 and 1956 presidential elections. The state legislature passed legislation requested by Lyndon B. Johnson that allowed him to run in both the presidential election and the concurrent senatorial election.

== Campaign ==
Fears of anti-Catholic voting in West Texas, which had given Herbert Hoover a narrow win over Al Smith in 1928, were not entirely realized. It is notable that the sparsely populated rural Plains counties of Armstrong, Bailey, Childress, Collingsworth, Dallam, Dawson, Donley, Floyd, Gaines, Hale, Hardeman, Hartley, Moore, Motley, Parmer, Wheeler, Willbarger and Yoakum switched from Stevenson to Nixon, as did Wise County north of Fort Worth, while a further thirty-eight counties saw Kennedy fail to reach Stevenson's vote percentage. However, this was more than offset by Kennedy's gains in heavily Hispanic Catholic South Texas, where few Mexicans had voted in 1928. Anti-Catholic voting was also lessened by appeals from former President Harry Truman, who campaigned for Kennedy and Johnson. As of the 2024 presidential election, this is the last time Glasscock County voted for a Democratic presidential candidate.

Nixon himself later commented "we lost Texas...because of that asshole Congressman", referring to Bruce Alger. The only Republican congressman in Texas at the time, Alger had led protestors, many of them well-heeled conservative women, against Johnson's visit to Dallas on November 4. One woman pulled Johnson's wife's gloves out of her hand, and her hat was knocked off by a protestor's placard. Nicknamed the "mink coat mob", the resulting press coverage was a humiliation for Texas Republicans and was blamed for damaging the party's electoral results in the South generally at a time when wives were regarded as sacrosanct.

Johnson won in the concurrent senatorial election against Republican nominee John Tower, but Tower won in the special election to fill the vacancy created by Johnson's election to the vice-presidency. This was the first time since 1920 that Texas voted differently than neighboring Oklahoma, and the second of only four such elections overall.

== Results ==
1960 United States presidential election in Texas
Party	Candidate	Votes	Percentage	Electoral votes
Democratic	John F. Kennedy	1,167,567	50.52%	24
Republican	Richard Nixon	1,121,301	48.52%	0
Constitution	Charles L. Sullivan	18,162	0.79%	0
Prohibition	Rutherford Decker	3,870	0.17%	0
Write-ins	Write-ins	175	0.01%	0
Totals		2,311,084	100.00%	24

=== Results by county ===
County	John F. Kennedy Democratic		Richard Nixon Republican		Various candidates Other parties		Margin		Total votes cast
County	#	%	#	%	#	%	#	%	Total votes cast
Anderson	3,296	47.21%	3,642	52.16%	44	0.63%	-346	-4.95%	6,982
Andrews	1,821	53.42%	1,550	45.47%	38	1.11%	271	7.95%	3,409
Angelina	7,046	56.32%	5,169	41.32%	295	2.36%	1,877	15.00%	12,510
Aransas	948	54.23%	792	45.31%	8	0.46%	156	8.92%	1,748
Archer	1,341	66.29%	680	33.61%	2	0.10%	661	32.68%	2,023
Armstrong	365	42.44%	488	56.74%	7	0.81%	-123	-14.30%	860
Atascosa	2,544	58.34%	1,812	41.55%	5	0.11%	732	16.79%	4,361
Austin	1,725	46.15%	1,978	52.92%	35	0.94%	-253	-6.77%	3,738
Bailey	1,064	46.85%	1,180	51.96%	27	1.19%	-116	-5.11%	2,271
Bandera	539	36.32%	942	63.48%	3	0.20%	-403	-27.16%	1,484
Bastrop	2,866	70.25%	1,208	29.61%	6	0.15%	1,658	40.64%	4,080
Baylor	1,199	62.68%	713	37.27%	1	0.05%	486	25.41%	1,913
Bee	2,557	53.42%	2,220	46.38%	10	0.21%	337	7.04%	4,787
Bell	10,651	69.67%	4,606	30.13%	31	0.20%	6,045	39.54%	15,288
Bexar	75,373	53.74%	63,934	45.59%	938	0.67%	11,439	8.15%	140,245
Blanco	830	59.54%	557	39.96%	7	0.50%	273	19.58%	1,394
Borden	230	55.96%	166	40.39%	15	3.65%	64	15.57%	411
Bosque	1,852	52.54%	1,653	46.89%	20	0.57%	199	5.65%	3,525
Bowie	9,198	60.54%	5,927	39.01%	68	0.45%	3,271	21.53%	15,193
Brazoria	10,561	48.66%	10,880	50.13%	264	1.22%	-319	-1.47%	21,705
Brazos	5,907	56.38%	4,553	43.46%	17	0.16%	1,354	12.92%	10,477
Brewster	716	49.14%	736	50.51%	5	0.34%	-20	-1.37%	1,457
Briscoe	570	51.26%	533	47.93%	9	0.81%	37	3.33%	1,112
Brooks	1,934	77.02%	567	22.58%	10	0.40%	1,367	54.44%	2,511
Brown	3,720	51.11%	3,512	48.26%	46	0.63%	208	2.85%	7,278
Burleson	2,466	78.46%	672	21.38%	5	0.16%	1,794	57.08%	3,143
Burnet	1,770	59.48%	1,189	39.95%	17	0.57%	581	19.53%	2,976
Caldwell	2,729	64.64%	1,482	35.10%	11	0.26%	1,247	29.54%	4,222
Calhoun	1,961	54.56%	1,599	44.49%	34	0.95%	362	10.07%	3,594
Callahan	1,559	54.93%	1,261	44.43%	18	0.63%	298	10.50%	2,838
Cameron	12,416	54.84%	10,190	45.01%	34	0.15%	2,226	9.83%	22,640
Camp	1,307	59.41%	873	39.68%	20	0.91%	434	19.73%	2,200
Carson	1,009	41.92%	1,387	57.62%	11	0.46%	-378	-15.70%	2,407
Cass	2,934	55.46%	2,322	43.89%	34	0.64%	612	11.57%	5,290
Castro	1,544	64.82%	810	34.01%	28	1.18%	734	30.81%	2,382
Chambers	1,524	54.12%	1,260	44.74%	32	1.14%	264	9.38%	2,816
Cherokee	4,544	57.65%	3,233	41.02%	105	1.33%	1,311	16.63%	7,882
Childress	1,189	42.97%	1,571	56.78%	7	0.25%	-382	-13.81%	2,767
Clay	1,692	62.25%	1,019	37.49%	7	0.26%	673	24.76%	2,718
Cochran	1,028	61.41%	646	38.59%	0	0.00%	382	22.82%	1,674
Coke	799	57.56%	575	41.43%	14	1.01%	224	16.13%	1,388
Coleman	1,835	46.14%	2,127	53.48%	15	0.38%	-292	-7.34%	3,977
Collin	5,229	57.10%	3,865	42.20%	64	0.70%	1,364	14.90%	9,158
Collingsworth	691	38.78%	1,084	60.83%	7	0.39%	-393	-22.05%	1,782
Colorado	2,299	54.13%	1,909	44.95%	39	0.92%	390	9.18%	4,247
Comal	1,845	37.34%	3,082	62.38%	14	0.28%	-1,237	-25.04%	4,941
Comanche	1,979	51.67%	1,828	47.73%	23	0.60%	151	3.94%	3,830
Concho	718	57.81%	522	42.03%	2	0.16%	196	15.78%	1,242
Cooke	3,168	44.15%	3,983	55.50%	25	0.35%	-815	-11.35%	7,176
Coryell	2,700	64.41%	1,477	35.23%	15	0.36%	1,223	29.18%	4,192
Cottle	986	72.45%	370	27.19%	5	0.37%	616	45.26%	1,361
Crane	848	54.08%	678	43.24%	42	2.68%	170	10.84%	1,568
Crockett	517	44.72%	635	54.93%	4	0.35%	-118	-10.21%	1,156
Crosby	1,783	66.46%	889	33.13%	11	0.41%	894	33.33%	2,683
Culberson	343	52.77%	300	46.15%	7	1.08%	43	6.62%	650
Dallam	835	46.18%	961	53.15%	12	0.66%	-126	-6.97%	1,808
Dallas	88,876	36.99%	149,369	62.16%	2,054	0.85%	-60,493	-25.17%	240,299
Dawson	2,063	48.59%	2,161	50.89%	22	0.52%	-98	-2.30%	4,246
Deaf Smith	1,299	38.79%	2,024	60.44%	26	0.78%	-725	-21.65%	3,349
Delta	1,360	74.24%	460	25.11%	12	0.66%	900	49.13%	1,832
Denton	5,366	48.26%	5,724	51.48%	29	0.26%	-358	-3.22%	11,119
DeWitt	2,253	44.80%	2,763	54.94%	13	0.26%	-510	-10.14%	5,029
Dickens	1,075	66.89%	521	32.42%	11	0.68%	554	34.47%	1,607
Dimmit	886	57.64%	648	42.16%	3	0.20%	238	15.48%	1,537
Donley	764	44.42%	951	55.29%	5	0.29%	-187	-10.87%	1,720
Duval	3,803	82.42%	809	17.53%	2	0.04%	2,994	64.89%	4,614
Eastland	3,058	47.42%	3,359	52.09%	32	0.50%	-301	-4.67%	6,449
Ector	8,996	43.52%	11,145	53.91%	531	2.57%	-2,149	-10.39%	20,672
Edwards	168	26.29%	463	72.46%	8	1.25%	-295	-46.17%	639
Ellis	5,841	61.21%	3,666	38.42%	36	0.38%	2,175	22.79%	9,543
El Paso	26,027	54.59%	21,551	45.20%	99	0.21%	4,476	9.39%	47,677
Erath	2,490	47.74%	2,696	51.69%	30	0.58%	-206	-3.95%	5,216
Falls	3,399	68.46%	1,559	31.40%	7	0.14%	1,840	37.06%	4,965
Fannin	4,282	69.76%	1,844	30.04%	12	0.20%	2,438	39.72%	6,138
Fayette	3,462	60.75%	2,213	38.83%	24	0.42%	1,249	21.92%	5,699
Fisher	1,966	74.05%	679	25.57%	10	0.38%	1,287	48.48%	2,655
Floyd	1,437	47.24%	1,580	51.94%	25	0.82%	-143	-4.70%	3,042
Foard	723	72.66%	270	27.14%	2	0.20%	453	45.52%	995
Fort Bend	4,339	56.27%	3,301	42.81%	71	0.92%	1,038	13.46%	7,711
Franklin	1,148	64.71%	620	34.95%	6	0.34%	528	29.76%	1,774
Freestone	1,997	54.71%	1,629	44.63%	24	0.66%	368	10.08%	3,650
Frio	1,068	59.66%	713	39.83%	9	0.50%	355	19.83%	1,790
Gaines	1,498	49.26%	1,520	49.98%	23	0.76%	-22	-0.72%	3,041
Galveston	23,940	58.64%	16,373	40.10%	515	1.26%	7,567	18.54%	40,828
Garza	829	52.60%	737	46.76%	10	0.63%	92	5.84%	1,576
Gillespie	816	23.27%	2,687	76.62%	4	0.11%	-1,871	-53.35%	3,507
Glasscock	207	56.56%	152	41.53%	7	1.91%	55	15.03%	366
Goliad	711	48.87%	741	50.93%	3	0.21%	-30	-2.06%	1,455
Gonzales	2,730	63.62%	1,554	36.22%	7	0.16%	1,176	27.40%	4,291
Gray	2,802	31.09%	6,197	68.76%	14	0.16%	-3,395	-37.67%	9,013
Grayson	9,866	57.26%	7,312	42.44%	53	0.31%	2,554	14.82%	17,231
Gregg	7,765	41.44%	10,679	56.99%	293	1.56%	-2,914	-15.55%	18,737
Grimes	1,713	61.66%	1,053	37.90%	12	0.43%	660	23.76%	2,778
Guadalupe	3,116	45.91%	3,657	53.88%	14	0.21%	-541	-7.97%	6,787
Hale	3,695	43.31%	4,784	56.07%	53	0.62%	-1,089	-12.76%	8,532
Hall	1,192	55.88%	939	44.02%	2	0.09%	253	11.86%	2,133
Hamilton	1,136	41.51%	1,592	58.17%	9	0.33%	-456	-16.66%	2,737
Hansford	512	27.84%	1,322	71.89%	5	0.27%	-810	-44.05%	1,839
Hardeman	1,182	44.52%	1,472	55.44%	1	0.04%	-290	-10.92%	2,655
Hardin	4,315	66.89%	2,115	32.79%	21	0.33%	2,200	34.10%	6,451
Harris	148,275	45.57%	168,170	51.68%	8,954	2.75%	-19,895	-6.11%	325,399
Harrison	5,108	51.36%	4,613	46.39%	224	2.25%	495	4.97%	9,945
Hartley	397	48.71%	413	50.67%	5	0.61%	-16	-1.96%	815
Haskell	2,776	76.05%	866	23.73%	8	0.22%	1,910	52.32%	3,650
Hays	2,916	64.39%	1,606	35.46%	7	0.15%	1,310	28.93%	4,529
Hemphill	333	28.20%	847	71.72%	1	0.08%	-514	-43.52%	1,181
Henderson	3,411	57.14%	2,521	42.23%	38	0.64%	890	14.91%	5,970
Hidalgo	18,663	57.59%	13,628	42.05%	115	0.35%	5,035	15.54%	32,406
Hill	4,340	65.83%	2,226	33.76%	27	0.41%	2,114	32.07%	6,593
Hockley	3,169	59.15%	2,159	40.29%	30	0.56%	1,010	18.86%	5,358
Hood	1,238	56.61%	943	43.12%	6	0.27%	295	13.49%	2,187
Hopkins	3,228	60.26%	2,117	39.52%	12	0.22%	1,111	20.74%	5,357
Houston	2,703	61.67%	1,591	36.30%	89	2.03%	1,112	25.37%	4,383
Howard	4,844	58.12%	3,403	40.83%	88	1.06%	1,441	17.29%	8,335
Hudspeth	409	59.71%	267	38.98%	9	1.31%	142	20.73%	685
Hunt	4,116	49.94%	4,084	49.55%	42	0.51%	32	0.39%	8,242
Hutchinson	3,295	33.81%	6,432	65.99%	20	0.21%	-3,137	-32.18%	9,747
Irion	246	50.51%	238	48.87%	3	0.62%	8	1.64%	487
Jack	1,079	44.37%	1,342	55.18%	11	0.45%	-263	-10.81%	2,432
Jackson	2,268	57.10%	1,670	42.04%	34	0.86%	598	15.06%	3,972
Jasper	3,004	58.64%	2,102	41.03%	17	0.33%	902	17.61%	5,123
Jeff Davis	195	51.18%	182	47.77%	4	1.05%	13	3.41%	381
Jefferson	40,533	57.63%	29,395	41.80%	403	0.57%	11,138	15.83%	70,331
Jim Hogg	1,255	84.85%	224	15.15%	0	0.00%	1,031	69.70%	1,479
Jim Wells	5,330	65.71%	2,773	34.18%	9	0.11%	2,557	31.53%	8,112
Johnson	3,844	45.59%	4,510	53.49%	77	0.91%	-666	-7.90%	8,431
Jones	2,772	55.60%	2,196	44.04%	18	0.36%	576	11.56%	4,986
Karnes	2,556	62.57%	1,526	37.36%	3	0.07%	1,030	25.21%	4,085
Kaufman	3,008	52.15%	2,717	47.10%	43	0.75%	291	5.05%	5,768
Kendall	549	26.14%	1,544	73.52%	7	0.33%	-995	-47.38%	2,100
Kenedy	78	51.32%	74	48.68%	0	0.00%	4	2.64%	152
Kent	491	70.34%	205	29.37%	2	0.29%	286	40.97%	698
Kerr	1,323	28.79%	3,252	70.76%	21	0.46%	-1,929	-41.97%	4,596
Kimble	550	43.89%	699	55.79%	4	0.32%	-149	-11.90%	1,253
King	133	76.88%	39	22.54%	1	0.58%	94	54.34%	173
Kinney	358	62.92%	211	37.08%	0	0.00%	147	25.84%	569
Kleberg	3,773	64.32%	2,092	35.66%	1	0.02%	1,681	28.66%	5,866
Knox	1,365	65.06%	729	34.75%	4	0.19%	636	30.31%	2,098
Lamar	5,084	56.02%	3,964	43.68%	28	0.31%	1,120	12.34%	9,076
Lamb	3,089	51.42%	2,764	46.01%	154	2.56%	325	5.41%	6,007
Lampasas	1,372	52.59%	1,222	46.84%	15	0.57%	150	5.75%	2,609
La Salle	718	68.64%	326	31.17%	2	0.19%	392	37.47%	1,046
Lavaca	4,002	72.47%	1,507	27.29%	13	0.24%	2,495	45.18%	5,522
Lee	1,369	55.85%	1,048	42.76%	34	1.39%	321	13.09%	2,451
Leon	1,803	67.18%	868	32.34%	13	0.48%	935	34.84%	2,684
Liberty	3,902	53.12%	3,361	45.76%	82	1.12%	541	7.36%	7,345
Limestone	3,472	63.00%	2,023	36.71%	16	0.29%	1,449	26.29%	5,511
Lipscomb	267	22.08%	939	77.67%	3	0.25%	-672	-55.59%	1,209
Live Oak	770	42.26%	1,048	57.52%	4	0.22%	-278	-15.26%	1,822
Llano	1,131	61.47%	704	38.26%	5	0.27%	427	23.21%	1,840
Loving	46	48.42%	42	44.21%	7	7.37%	4	4.21%	95
Lubbock	15,340	43.08%	20,065	56.35%	202	0.57%	-4,725	-13.27%	35,607
Lynn	1,872	65.85%	953	33.52%	18	0.63%	919	32.33%	2,843
McCulloch	1,579	57.46%	1,165	42.39%	4	0.15%	414	15.07%	2,748
McLennan	20,100	57.17%	14,926	42.46%	130	0.37%	5,174	14.71%	35,156
McMullen	240	49.90%	241	50.10%	0	0.00%	-1	-0.20%	481
Madison	909	58.57%	607	39.11%	36	2.32%	302	19.46%	1,552
Marion	904	53.46%	742	43.88%	45	2.66%	162	9.58%	1,691
Martin	831	69.08%	350	29.09%	22	1.83%	481	39.99%	1,203
Mason	575	40.58%	833	58.79%	9	0.64%	-258	-18.21%	1,417
Matagorda	2,971	49.53%	2,975	49.60%	52	0.87%	-4	-0.07%	5,998
Maverick	1,498	70.03%	639	29.87%	2	0.09%	859	40.16%	2,139
Medina	2,325	53.23%	2,028	46.43%	15	0.34%	297	6.80%	4,368
Menard	491	44.68%	608	55.32%	0	0.00%	-117	-10.64%	1,099
Midland	5,842	33.11%	11,343	64.28%	460	2.61%	-5,501	-31.17%	17,645
Milam	3,640	65.51%	1,898	34.16%	18	0.32%	1,742	31.35%	5,556
Mills	869	46.05%	1,012	53.63%	6	0.32%	-143	-7.58%	1,887
Mitchell	2,131	63.61%	1,208	36.06%	11	0.33%	923	27.55%	3,350
Montague	2,346	52.54%	2,101	47.05%	18	0.40%	245	5.49%	4,465
Montgomery	3,510	50.60%	3,309	47.70%	118	1.70%	201	2.90%	6,937
Moore	1,547	38.43%	2,463	61.19%	15	0.37%	-916	-22.76%	4,025
Morris	1,952	55.08%	1,569	44.27%	23	0.65%	383	10.81%	3,544
Motley	439	47.10%	480	51.50%	13	1.39%	-41	-4.40%	932
Nacogdoches	3,522	52.32%	3,042	45.19%	168	2.50%	480	7.13%	6,732
Navarro	5,540	62.24%	3,361	37.76%	0	0.00%	2,179	24.48%	8,901
Newton	1,815	70.08%	756	29.19%	19	0.73%	1,059	40.89%	2,590
Nolan	3,247	57.22%	2,421	42.66%	7	0.12%	826	14.56%	5,675
Nueces	29,361	60.70%	18,907	39.09%	100	0.21%	10,454	21.61%	48,368
Ochiltree	521	21.76%	1,870	78.11%	3	0.13%	-1,349	-56.35%	2,394
Oldham	326	50.70%	313	48.68%	4	0.62%	13	2.02%	643
Orange	9,078	62.02%	5,483	37.46%	76	0.52%	3,595	24.56%	14,637
Palo Pinto	3,022	52.63%	2,695	46.93%	25	0.44%	327	5.70%	5,742
Panola	2,187	48.41%	2,264	50.11%	67	1.48%	-77	-1.70%	4,518
Parker	3,629	50.77%	3,467	48.50%	52	0.73%	162	2.27%	7,148
Parmer	1,090	39.12%	1,674	60.09%	22	0.79%	-584	-20.97%	2,786
Pecos	1,724	54.44%	1,412	44.58%	31	0.98%	312	9.86%	3,167
Polk	2,037	60.63%	1,268	37.74%	55	1.64%	769	22.89%	3,360
Potter	8,989	38.70%	14,202	61.14%	38	0.16%	-5,213	-22.44%	23,229
Presidio	866	69.39%	376	30.13%	6	0.48%	490	39.26%	1,248
Rains	680	62.90%	401	37.10%	0	0.00%	279	25.80%	1,081
Randall	3,282	31.96%	6,958	67.76%	29	0.28%	-3,676	-35.80%	10,269
Reagan	621	54.91%	489	43.24%	21	1.86%	132	11.67%	1,131
Real	273	41.81%	377	57.73%	3	0.46%	-104	-15.92%	653
Red River	2,850	64.94%	1,527	34.79%	12	0.27%	1,323	30.15%	4,389
Reeves	2,235	58.48%	1,549	40.53%	38	0.99%	686	17.95%	3,822
Refugio	1,777	62.53%	1,062	37.37%	3	0.11%	715	25.16%	2,842
Roberts	104	23.37%	339	76.18%	2	0.45%	-235	-52.81%	445
Robertson	2,669	73.81%	935	25.86%	12	0.33%	1,734	47.95%	3,616
Rockwall	917	57.93%	652	41.19%	14	0.88%	265	16.74%	1,583
Runnels	1,938	47.56%	2,128	52.22%	9	0.22%	-190	-4.66%	4,075
Rusk	4,390	40.50%	6,001	55.36%	449	4.14%	-1,611	-14.86%	10,840
Sabine	1,208	65.55%	619	33.59%	16	0.87%	589	31.96%	1,843
San Augustine	1,269	64.68%	638	32.52%	55	2.80%	631	32.16%	1,962
San Jacinto	1,115	71.02%	448	28.54%	7	0.45%	667	42.48%	1,570
San Patricio	5,246	62.52%	3,129	37.29%	16	0.19%	2,117	25.23%	8,391
San Saba	1,251	59.35%	849	40.28%	8	0.38%	402	19.07%	2,108
Schleicher	351	43.39%	455	56.24%	3	0.37%	-104	-12.85%	809
Scurry	3,020	57.09%	2,235	42.25%	35	0.66%	785	14.84%	5,290
Shackelford	713	51.04%	684	48.96%	0	0.00%	29	2.08%	1,397
Shelby	3,266	65.41%	1,679	33.63%	48	0.96%	1,587	31.78%	4,993
Sherman	305	30.72%	686	69.08%	2	0.20%	-381	-38.36%	993
Smith	8,494	40.80%	12,042	57.84%	285	1.37%	-3,548	-17.04%	20,821
Somervell	345	43.13%	441	55.13%	14	1.75%	-96	-12.00%	800
Starr	4,051	93.49%	280	6.46%	2	0.05%	3,771	87.03%	4,333
Stephens	1,357	44.80%	1,664	54.94%	8	0.26%	-307	-10.14%	3,029
Sterling	193	51.47%	182	48.53%	0	0.00%	11	2.94%	375
Stonewall	864	73.66%	306	26.09%	3	0.26%	558	47.57%	1,173
Sutton	474	52.03%	437	47.97%	0	0.00%	37	4.06%	911
Swisher	1,777	57.27%	1,310	42.22%	16	0.52%	467	15.05%	3,103
Tarrant	59,385	44.66%	72,813	54.75%	788	0.59%	-13,428	-10.09%	132,986
Taylor	9,347	43.17%	12,258	56.62%	45	0.21%	-2,911	-13.45%	21,650
Terrell	352	54.49%	291	45.05%	3	0.46%	61	9.44%	646
Terry	2,237	53.75%	1,908	45.84%	17	0.41%	329	7.91%	4,162
Throckmorton	689	60.76%	442	38.98%	3	0.26%	247	21.78%	1,134
Titus	2,701	54.61%	2,216	44.80%	29	0.59%	485	9.81%	4,946
Tom Green	7,031	46.12%	8,176	53.63%	39	0.26%	-1,145	-7.51%	15,246
Travis	27,022	54.85%	22,107	44.87%	135	0.27%	4,915	9.98%	49,264
Trinity	1,521	67.18%	707	31.23%	36	1.59%	814	35.95%	2,264
Tyler	1,242	46.76%	1,401	52.75%	13	0.49%	-159	-5.99%	2,656
Upshur	3,248	58.48%	2,262	40.73%	44	0.79%	986	17.75%	5,554
Upton	930	52.84%	798	45.34%	32	1.82%	132	7.50%	1,760
Uvalde	1,324	37.27%	2,214	62.33%	14	0.39%	-890	-25.06%	3,552
Val Verde	2,049	56.87%	1,551	43.05%	3	0.08%	498	13.82%	3,603
Van Zandt	2,825	56.88%	2,120	42.68%	22	0.44%	705	14.20%	4,967
Victoria	5,779	55.58%	4,591	44.16%	27	0.26%	1,188	11.42%	10,397
Walker	1,832	50.85%	1,750	48.57%	21	0.58%	82	2.28%	3,603
Waller	1,101	48.57%	1,115	49.18%	51	2.25%	-14	-0.61%	2,267
Ward	2,018	52.39%	1,763	45.77%	71	1.84%	255	6.62%	3,852
Washington	1,864	41.52%	2,613	58.21%	12	0.27%	-749	-16.69%	4,489
Webb	10,059	84.78%	1,802	15.19%	4	0.03%	8,257	69.59%	11,865
Wharton	5,004	59.16%	3,387	40.04%	67	0.79%	1,617	19.12%	8,458
Wheeler	1,011	41.37%	1,428	58.43%	5	0.20%	-417	-17.06%	2,444
Wichita	14,587	53.60%	12,587	46.25%	39	0.14%	2,000	7.35%	27,213
Wilbarger	2,319	45.21%	2,796	54.51%	14	0.27%	-477	-9.30%	5,129
Willacy	2,109	60.48%	1,367	39.20%	11	0.32%	742	21.28%	3,487
Williamson	5,410	68.74%	2,429	30.86%	31	0.39%	2,981	37.88%	7,870
Wilson	2,905	69.88%	1,248	30.02%	4	0.10%	1,657	39.86%	4,157
Winkler	1,642	50.48%	1,562	48.02%	49	1.51%	80	2.46%	3,253
Wise	2,470	48.90%	2,562	50.72%	19	0.38%	-92	-1.82%	5,051
Wood	2,633	51.51%	2,400	46.95%	79	1.55%	233	4.56%	5,112
Yoakum	994	44.88%	1,207	54.49%	14	0.63%	-213	-9.61%	2,215
Young	2,419	53.65%	2,067	45.84%	23	0.51%	352	7.81%	4,509
Zapata	675	72.19%	260	27.81%	0	0.00%	415	44.38%	935
Zavala	706	47.86%	761	51.59%	8	0.54%	-55	-3.73%	1,475
Totals	1,167,567	50.52%	1,121,310	48.52%	22,207	0.96%	46,257	2.00%	2,311,084

==== Counties that flipped from Republican to Democratic ====
- Andrews
- Angelina
- Aransas
- Atascosa
- Bee
- Bexar
- Blanco
- Brazos
- Brown
- Calhoun
- Cameron
- Cass
- Chambers
- Cherokee
- Colorado
- Concho
- Culberson
- Dimmit
- El Paso
- Fayette
- Fort Bend
- Galveston
- Glasscock
- Grimes
- Hartley
- Hale
- Hardeman
- Hidalgo
- Hunt
- Irion
- Jackson
- Jasper
- Jefferson
- Jeff Davis
- Jim Wells
- Karnes
- Kenedy
- Kinney
- Lampasas
- Lavaca
- Lee
- Liberty
- Loving
- McCulloch
- Marion
- Madison
- Medina
- Montgomery
- Nacogdoches
- Nueces
- Palo Pinto
- Parker
- Pecos
- Polk
- Reagan
- Reeves
- Refugio
- Shackelford
- Travis
- Upshur
- Upton
- Val Verde
- Victoria
- Walker
- Ward
- Wharton
- Wood
- Willacy
- Winkler

==== Counties that flipped from Democratic to Republican ====
- Armstrong
- Bailey
- Childress
- Collingsworth
- Dallam
- Dawson
- Donley
- Floyd
- Gaines
- Moore
- Motley
- Parmer
- Sterling
- Sutton
- Terrell
- Wheeler
- Wilbarger
- Wise
- Young
- Yoakum

== See also ==
- United States presidential elections in Texas
- 1960 United States presidential election
- John F. Kennedy 1960 presidential campaign
- Richard Nixon 1960 presidential campaign

== Works cited ==
- Moreland, Laurence; Steed, Robert; Baker, Tod, eds. (1991). The 1988 Presidential Election in the South: Continuity Amidst Change in Southern Party Politics. Praeger Publishers. ISBN 0275931455.
