= Squaw Lake =

Squaw Lake may refer to:

- Squaw Lake, Minnesota, USA; a city in Itasca County
- Nüümü Hu Hupi, USA; a lake in John Muir Wilderness, Sierra Nevada, Fresno County. Formerly known as "Squaw Lake"
- East Indian Lake, USA; a lake in Kalkaska County, Michigan formerly known as "Squaw Lake"
- Muskrat Lake (New York), USA; a lake in Hamilton County formerly known as "Squaw Lake"
- Eight lakes in Wisconsin; all formerly known as some variation of "Squaw Lake"
- Schefferville/Squaw Lake Water Aerodrome (Transport Canada id: CSZ9) a.k.a. "Squaw Lake" (airport)

== See also ==
- Comanche Creek Reservoir, Texas, USA
- Granite Mountain Reservoir, Nevada, USA
- Squaw Humper Dam, South Dakota, USA
- Squaw (disambiguation)
- Lake (disambiguation)
