= Squaw Creek =

Squaw Creek may refer to:

== Places ==
- Dollis Creek (formerly known as "Squaw Creek"), a tributary of the Tatshenshini River that traverses the British Columbia-Yukon border in western Canada
- Loess Bluffs National Wildlife Refuge, formerly known as "Squaw Creek National Wildlife Refuge", in northwestern Missouri
- Squaw Creek (Pit River), a tributary of the Pit River in northern California, United States
- Chief Eagle Eye Creek (formerly Squaw Creek), a tributary of the Payette River in western Idaho, United States
- Ioway Creek (Ames, Iowa), formerly known as "Squaw Creek", a tributary of the South Skunk River in central Iowa, United States
  - Squaw Creek Bridge 1 (1917) Harrison Township, Boone County, Iowa, USA; an NRHP bridge
  - Squaw Creek Bridge 2 (1918) Harrison Township, Boone County, Iowa, USA; an NRHP bridge
- Granite Mountain Reservoir, in Nevada, United States, formerly known as "Squaw Valley Reservoir" and "Squaw Creek Reservoir"
- Comanche Creek Reservoir in Texas, which provides cooling water for Comanche Peak Nuclear Generating Station. Formerly known as "Squaw Creek Reservoir."
- Washeshu Creek (formerly known as "Squaw Creek"), a tributary of the Truckee River in the U.S. states of California and Nevada.
  - Comanche Creek (Paluxy River), inflow and outflow of the Reservoir in Hood and Somervell Counties, Texas
- Whychus Creek (formerly known as "Squaw Creek"), a tributary of the Deschutes River in central Oregon, United States
- Squeatah Creek (formerly known as "Squaw Creek"), stream in Kootenai County, Idaho
- Iskwao Creek (formerly known as "Squaw Creek"), a river in Saskatchewan, Canada

== Other uses ==
- Squaw Creek Southern Railroad, a rail company operating in Georgia and Indiana

== See also ==
- Squaw Run (Allegheny River tributary), Allegheny County, Pennsylvania, USA
- Tahc'a Okute Wakpa, Oglala Lakota County, South Dakota, USA; a stream formerly known as "Squaw-Humper Creek"
- Squaw (disambiguation)
- Creek (disambiguation)
