= Squaw Island =

Squaw Island may refer to:

- Skenoh Island, (formerly known as Squaw Island) New York
- Susquehanna River Island, (formerly known as Squaw island) New York
- Ojibwa Island (formerly Squaw Island) in the Beaver Island group
  - Squaw Island Light, a lighthouse on Ojibwa Island in Lake Michigan
- Unity Island, an island in the Niagara River in Buffalo, New York, formerly known as Squaw Island
- Halls Island, a strip of land near Hyanis Port, Massachusetts. Formerly known as Squaw Island

== See also ==
- Old Squaw Islands, Nunavut
