= Squaw Valley =

Squaw Valley may refer to:

Communities

- Yokuts Valley, California, formerly known as Squaw Valley, a census-designated place in Fresno County
- Olympic Valley, California, formerly known as Squaw Valley, an unincorporated community in Placer County

Landmarks

- Palisades Tahoe, formerly known as Squaw Valley Ski Resort, in Placer County, California
- Lake Tahoe Preparatory School, formerly known as Squaw Valley Academy, in Placer County, California
- Cedar Valley (Oregon), formerly known as Squaw Valley, in Oregon
- Granite Mountain Reservoir, formerly known as Squaw Valley Reservoir, in Nevada

Other

- 1960 Winter Olympics, also called the Squaw Valley Olympics, which took place in Placer County, California

== See also ==
- Squaw Canyon Oil Field, Utah, USA
- Valley (disambiguation)
- Squaw (disambiguation)
