= Squaw (disambiguation) =

Squaw is an ethnic and sexual slur, historically used for Indigenous North American women.

Squaw may also refer to:

== Places ==
- Squaw Township, Warren County, Iowa, USA
- Squaw Creek (disambiguation)
- Squaw Island (disambiguation)
- Squaw Lake (disambiguation)
- Squaw Peak (disambiguation)
- Squaw Point, a point of land on Gull Lake in Minnesota, U.S.
- Squaw Rock, another name for Frog Woman Rock, a volcanic monolith in Mendocino County, California
- Squaw Valley (disambiguation)

== Plants ==
- Squaw grass, Xerophyllum tenax
- Squaw root, Conopholis americana
- Squaw weed, Senecio aureus
- Squaw tea, the herb Ephedra nevadensis or an herbal tea containing ephedra

== Other uses ==
- Squaw Sachem of Mistick (c. 1590-1650 or 1667), a leader of a Massachusett tribe who deeded large tracts of land in eastern Massachusetts to early colonial settlers
- McGill Squaws, former name of the women's collegiate sports teams of McGill University, now McGill Martlets
- "The Squaw", 1893 short story by Bram Stoker

== See also ==
- Oldsquaw, a former common name in America for the Long-tailed duck
- Squawfish, a common name for Ptychocheilus
