= 1972 United States Senate election in Texas =

- November 7, 1972
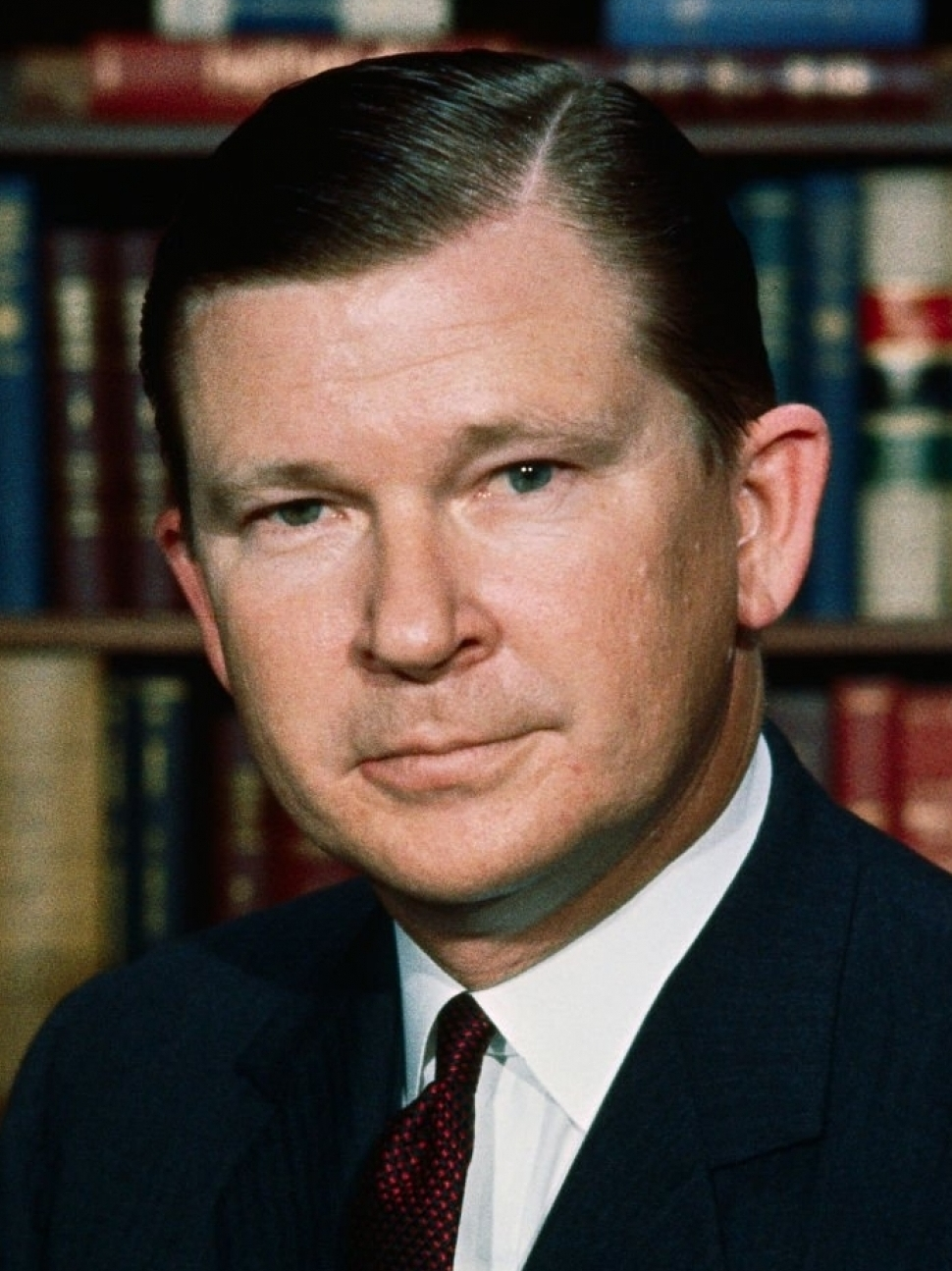

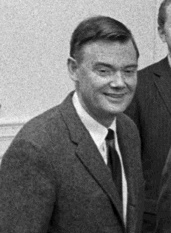
Nominee	John Tower	Barefoot Sanders
Party	Republican	Democratic
Popular vote	1,822,877	1,511,985
Percentage	53.41%	44.30%
- County results Tower: 40–50% 50–60% 60–70% 70–80% Sanders: 30–40% 40–50% 50–60% 60–70% 70–80% 80–90% Amaya: 30–40%
U.S. senator before election
John Tower
Republican
Elected U.S. Senator
John Tower
Republican

The 1972 United States Senate election in Texas was held on November 7, 1972. Incumbent Republican U.S. Senator John Tower won re-election to a third term.

== Democratic primary ==
=== Candidates ===
- Thomas M. Cartlidge
- Barefoot Sanders, former state representative and Johnson administration official
- Alfonso Veloz, candidate for governor in 1968
- Hugh Wilson, candidate for Senate in 1957 and 1961
- Ralph Yarborough, former U.S. senator (1957–1971)

=== Results ===
1972 Democratic U.S. Senate primary
Party	Candidate	Votes	%
Democratic	Ralph Yarborough	1,032,606	49.99%
Democratic	Barefoot Sanders	787,504	38.12%
Democratic	Hugh Wilson	125,460	6.07%
Democratic	Thomas M. Cartlidge	66,240	3.21%
Democratic	Alfonso Veloz	53,938	2.61%
Total votes		2,065,748	100.00%

Although he received over one million votes, Yarborough was 269 short of a majority. He and Sanders advanced to a runoff election held on June 3.

=== Runoff campaign ===
1972 Democratic U.S. Senate runoff
Party	Candidate	Votes	%	±%
Democratic	Barefoot Sanders	1,008,499	52.08%	▲13.96
Democratic	Ralph Yarborough	928,132	47.93%	▼2.06
Total votes		1,936,631	100.00%	

== Republican primary ==
=== Candidates ===
- John G. Tower, incumbent U.S. senator since 1961

== Results ==
General election results
Party	Candidate	Votes	%	±%
Republican	John Tower (incumbent)	1,822,877	53.41%	−2.98%
Democratic	Barefoot Sanders	1,511,985	44.30%	+1.15%
Raza Unida	Flores Amaya	63,543	1.86%	N/A
Socialist Workers	Tom Leonard	14,464	0.42%	N/A
Total votes		3,412,869	100.0%	
