= The Squaw Man =

The Squaw Man or A Squaw Man may refer to:

- The Squaw Man (play) (1905), by Edwin Milton Royle
- The Squaw Man (novel) (1907), adapted by Julie Opp Faversham from the play
- A Squaw Man, a 1912 silent movie
- The Squaw Man (1914 film), a silent movie version of the play
- The Squaw Man (1918 film), a silent movie remake
- The Squaw Man (1931 film), a sound movie version
- The Squawman (1973 episode), second season of Kung Fu (1972 TV series)

== See also ==
- The Squaw Man's Son (1917 film) American Western silent film
- Squaw (disambiguation)
- Man (disambiguation)
