= Comanche Peak Nuclear Power Plant =

Nuclear power station in Texas

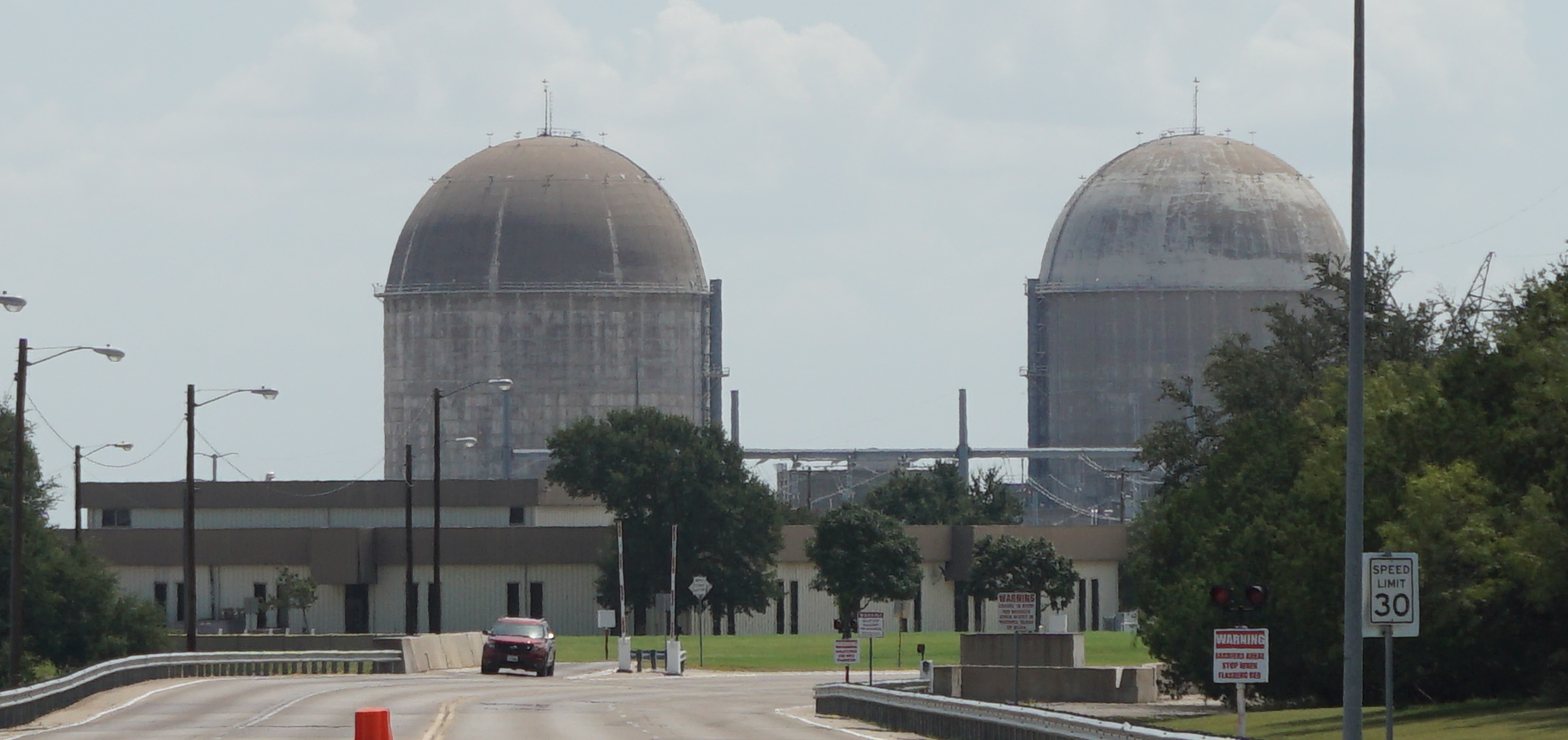
- Comanche Peak's twin containment domes in August 2017
- Country: United States
- Location: Somervell County, near Glen Rose, Texas
- Coordinates: 32°17′54″N 97°47′6″W
- Status: Operational
- Construction began: December 19, 1974
- Commission date: Unit 1: August 13, 1990; Unit 2: August 3, 1993
- Owner: Luminant
- Operator: Luminant Generation Company LLC (Note: Technically it's unclear if the operator is Luminant Generation Company LLC or Vistra Operations Company LLC, as the NRC lists the plant's operator as TEX Operations Company LLC, which was the former name of Vistra Operations Company LLC, yet PRIS lists Luminant Generation Company LLC. However since Luminant is indirectly owned by Vistra, it seems to be a moot point, so the operator listed is the one from PRIS (which is more likely to be up to date).)

Nuclear power station
- Reactor type: PWR
- Reactor supplier: Westinghouse
- Cooling source: Squaw Creek Reservoir
- Thermal capacity: 2 × 3612 MW_{th}

Power generation
- Units operational: 1 × 1218 MW; 1 × 1207 MW
- Make and model: WH 4-loop (DRYAMB)
- Units planned: 2 × 1700 MW
- Nameplate capacity: 2425 MW
- Capacity factor: 95.1% (2018); 88.40% (lifetime)
- Annual net output: 19,356 GWh (2021)

External links
- Commons: Related media on Commons

Comanche Peak Nuclear Power Plant is located in Somervell County, Texas. The nuclear power plant is located 40 miles (64 km) southwest of Ft. Worth and about 60 miles (97 km) southwest of Dallas. It relies on nearby Comanche Creek Reservoir for cooling water. The plant has about 1,300 employees and is operated by Luminant Generation, a subsidiary of Vistra Corp.

The Engineer of Record is Gibbs & Hill, Inc. of New York, New York.

Construction of the two Westinghouse pressurized water reactors began in 1974. Unit 1, originally rated at 1,084 MWe, came online on April 17, 1990. In July 2024, the 40-year operating license, which was valid until February 8, 2030, received an early extension for another 20 years, until 2050. Unit 2, 1,124 MWe, followed on April 6, 1993 and is licensed to operate until 2053. Of the nuclear plants to begin construction prior to 1979, Unit 2 was among the last power reactors to come online in the United States, followed only by Units 1 and 2 at Watts Bar. Vogtle Units 3 & 4 were brought online in 2023 and 2024, respectively.

In June 2008, the U.S. Nuclear Regulatory Commission (NRC) approved a request to increase the generating capacity of Units 1 and 2 by approximately 4.5% each. Luminant Generation Co. implemented the changes during refueling outages. Unit 1 was uprated in autumn 2008 with a capacity increase of approximately 1,210 to 1,259 MWe and Unit 2, the capacity of which rose from an estimated 1,208 to 1,245 MWe, was uprated in autumn 2009.

== Proposed units 3 and 4 ==
On September 19, 2008, Luminant filed an application with the NRC for a Combined Construction and Operating License (COL) for two new reactors. The reactor design selected is the US version of the 1,700 MWe Advanced Pressurized Water Reactor (US-APWR), developed by Mitsubishi Heavy Industries (MHI). The project is a joint venture, with Luminant owning 88 percent and 12 percent owned by MHI. Luminant did not release an estimate of the project's cost, but CEO David Campbell said Luminant would try to build its new reactors at the low end of current industry estimates, which he said range from $2,500 to $6,000 a kilowatt — $8.5 billion to $20.4 billion for a 3,400 MW plant.

Some environmental and anti-nuclear organizations and individuals opposed the plant expansion, citing environmental, public safety and cost concerns. These included the Sustainable Energy and Economic Development Coalition, Public Citizen and state representative Lon Burnam.

As of November 2013, expansion had been suspended due a natural gas boom dramatically lowering power prices in Texas, and Mitsubishi Heavy Industries suspending development of its reactor design to focus on restarting its reactors in Japan. The Texas power generation company did not withdraw its application to the NRC entirely, leaving open the possibility that it might eventually expand.

== Electricity production ==
Generation (MWh) of Comanche Peak Nuclear Power Plant
Year	Jan	Feb	Mar	Apr	May	Jun	Jul	Aug	Sep	Oct	Nov	Dec	Annual (Total)
2001	1,658,989	1,512,259	1,438,872	974,914	1,670,269	1,601,768	1,597,727	1,313,115	1,599,085	1,667,805	1,614,299	1,673,163	18,322,265
2002	1,677,259	1,516,267	1,626,072	793,729	1,467,893	1,554,584	1,627,411	1,637,057	1,514,897	838,125	955,466	1,359,642	16,568,402
2003	1,704,206	1,539,389	1,495,109	1,643,055	1,156,176	1,623,908	1,185,893	1,654,502	1,620,510	943,762	1,608,609	1,573,824	17,748,943
2004	1,703,426	1,593,931	1,574,855	822,909	1,546,968	1,654,375	1,699,286	1,702,337	1,649,910	1,714,801	1,668,615	1,731,992	19,063,405
2005	1,731,092	1,510,072	1,570,916	860,084	1,725,904	1,677,833	1,722,316	1,723,075	1,671,502	1,076,389	1,415,196	1,758,821	18,443,200
2006	1,756,267	1,588,082	1,758,417	1,692,314	1,747,556	1,681,885	1,730,175	1,730,668	1,678,575	1,081,662	1,692,415	1,757,993	19,896,009
2007	1,752,326	1,445,856	875,777	1,083,462	1,741,074	1,676,951	1,723,691	1,719,211	1,667,647	1,734,026	1,690,907	1,734,819	18,845,747
2008	1,750,639	1,553,738	1,619,642	1,123,261	1,738,880	1,674,303	1,722,328	1,720,897	1,554,964	1,260,943	1,726,017	1,789,009	19,234,621
2009	1,790,046	1,616,782	1,785,753	1,729,079	1,671,072	1,712,524	1,759,341	1,761,586	1,712,466	1,079,817	1,699,598	1,823,405	20,141,469
2010	1,551,018	1,644,660	1,816,745	1,010,264	1,808,951	1,707,449	1,788,500	1,780,318	1,733,104	1,794,245	1,755,326	1,817,887	20,208,467
2011	1,767,217	1,641,021	1,797,420	999,644	1,657,829	1,726,564	1,488,527	1,730,579	1,737,580	1,164,244	1,752,151	1,819,785	19,282,561
2012	1,820,124	1,703,204	1,814,364	1,615,468	1,805,610	1,737,793	1,788,366	1,787,343	1,699,952	1,055,012	1,250,656	1,819,032	19,896,924
2013	1,821,067	1,642,479	1,767,174	1,111,407	1,812,029	1,742,454	1,753,829	1,787,719	1,731,612	1,806,926	1,687,767	1,822,677	20,487,140
2014	1,688,483	1,635,263	1,742,010	947,757	1,812,716	1,744,554	1,793,530	1,791,097	1,737,669	993,239	930,297	1,819,161	18,635,776
2015	1,821,718	1,644,082	1,816,908	1,752,625	1,791,649	1,694,367	1,790,555	1,785,184	1,733,435	963,894	1,340,670	1,819,037	19,954,124
2016	1,818,923	1,701,488	1,801,394	1,750,570	905,232	1,717,508	1,788,999	1,787,685	1,740,747	1,802,486	1,752,429	1,817,681	20,385,142
2017	1,831,666	1,651,441	1,791,628	910,067	1,605,288	952,824	905,519	1,439,095	1,629,164	1,095,468	1,381,945	1,805,820	16,999,925
2018	1,817,674	1,640,480	1,821,539	1,764,711	1,808,860	1,741,512	1,777,737	1,729,234	1,724,699	1,798,587	1,752,275	1,120,799	20,498,107
2019	1,239,484	1,635,692	1,742,775	1,343,660	980,849	1,735,124	1,779,949	1,773,839	1,719,884	1,795,730	1,750,631	1,807,093	19,304,710
2020	1,730,736	1,693,116	1,799,675	1,405,355	1,420,587	1,725,499	1,774,420	1,771,967	1,723,689	1,139,493	1,489,785	1,805,626	19,479,948
2021	1,807,655	1,633,289	1,769,116	1,716,490	1,793,889	1,368,501	1,734,877	1,768,640	1,714,437	962,602	1,284,678	1,802,079	19,356,253
2022	1,805,139	1,631,747	1,786,508	1,132,844	1,282,368	1,721,181	1,763,998	1,765,942	1,479,250	1,774,815	1,740,840	1,802,438	19,687,070
2023	1,803,160	1,630,123	1,793,431	1,512,237	965,395	1,556,353	1,749,193	1,755,280	1,705,830	1,282,731	1,340,581	1,798,412	18,892,726
2024	1,803,183	1,665,976	1,538,775	1,734,746	1,589,827	1,727,067	1,755,980	1,754,109	1,707,017	1,440,684	1,168,361	1,800,930	19,686,655
2025	1,597,498	1,628,588	1,796,800	1,421,598	1,351,167	1,716,862	1,762,820	1,757,499	1,505,142	1,772,931	1,737,762	1,800,867	19,849,534
2026	1,801,563	1,627,973	1,801,387	1,729,657	1,009,313	1,717,461	1,762,771	1,732,175					--

== Surrounding population ==
The Nuclear Regulatory Commission defines two emergency planning zones around nuclear power plants: a plume exposure pathway zone with a radius of 10 miles (16 km), concerned primarily with exposure to, and inhalation of, airborne radioactive contamination, and an ingestion pathway zone of about 50 miles (80 km), concerned primarily with ingestion of food and liquid contaminated by radioactivity.

The 2010 U.S. population within 10 miles (16 km) of Comanche Peak was 30,653, an increase of 44.1 percent in a decade, according to an analysis of U.S. Census data for msnbc.com. The 2010 U.S. population within 50 miles (80 km) was 1,755,528, an increase of 22.9 percent since 2000. Cities within 50 miles include Fort Worth (41 miles to city center).

== Seismic risk ==
The Nuclear Regulatory Commission's estimate of the risk each year of an earthquake intense enough to cause core damage to the reactor at Comanche Peak was 1 in 250,000, according to an NRC study published in August 2010.

== Reactor data ==
The Comanche Peak Nuclear Power Plant consists of two operational reactors, two additional units are planned.

Reactor unit	Reactor type	Capacity(MW)		Construction started	Electricity grid connection	Commercial operation	Shutdown
Reactor unit	Reactor type	Net	Gross	Construction started	Electricity grid connection	Commercial operation	Shutdown
Comanche Peak-1	Westinghouse 4-loop	1209	1259	19.12.1974	24.04.1990	13.08.1990	(2050)
Comanche Peak-2	Westinghouse 4-loop	1197	1250	19.12.1974	09.04.1993	03.08.1993	(2053)
Comanche Peak-3 (planned)	US-APWR	1700	?				
Comanche Peak-4 (planned)	US-APWR	1700	?				

== See also ==
- List of largest power stations in the United States
