= Juana Josefina Cavasos Barnard =

Mexican-American Indian captive, slaveowner, and pioneer

Juana Josefina Cavasos Barnard (c. 1822–1906) was a Mexican-American Indian captive, slaveowner, and pioneer around present-day Somervell County, Texas. Cavasos was born to María Josefina Cavasos in Matamoros, Tamaulipas, Mexico. On August 15, 1844 Cavasos along with a friend she was visiting were both abducted by Comanche near the Rio Grande river. There are several conflicting reports regarding the duration of her captivity, but her own personal account implies that it was less than a month in total. In 1900 Cavasos gave an oral testimony of her story titled "My life with the Indians" to her granddaughter Verdie Barnard Alison. Cavasos died of a stroke in 1906.

== Family ==
Her family was from Matamoros, Tamaulipas, Mexico. In 1848 she married Charles E. Barnard and they had fourteen children, six of whom survived into adulthood. Based on her oral testimony she "had twenty-five grandchildren and thirteen great-grandchildren."

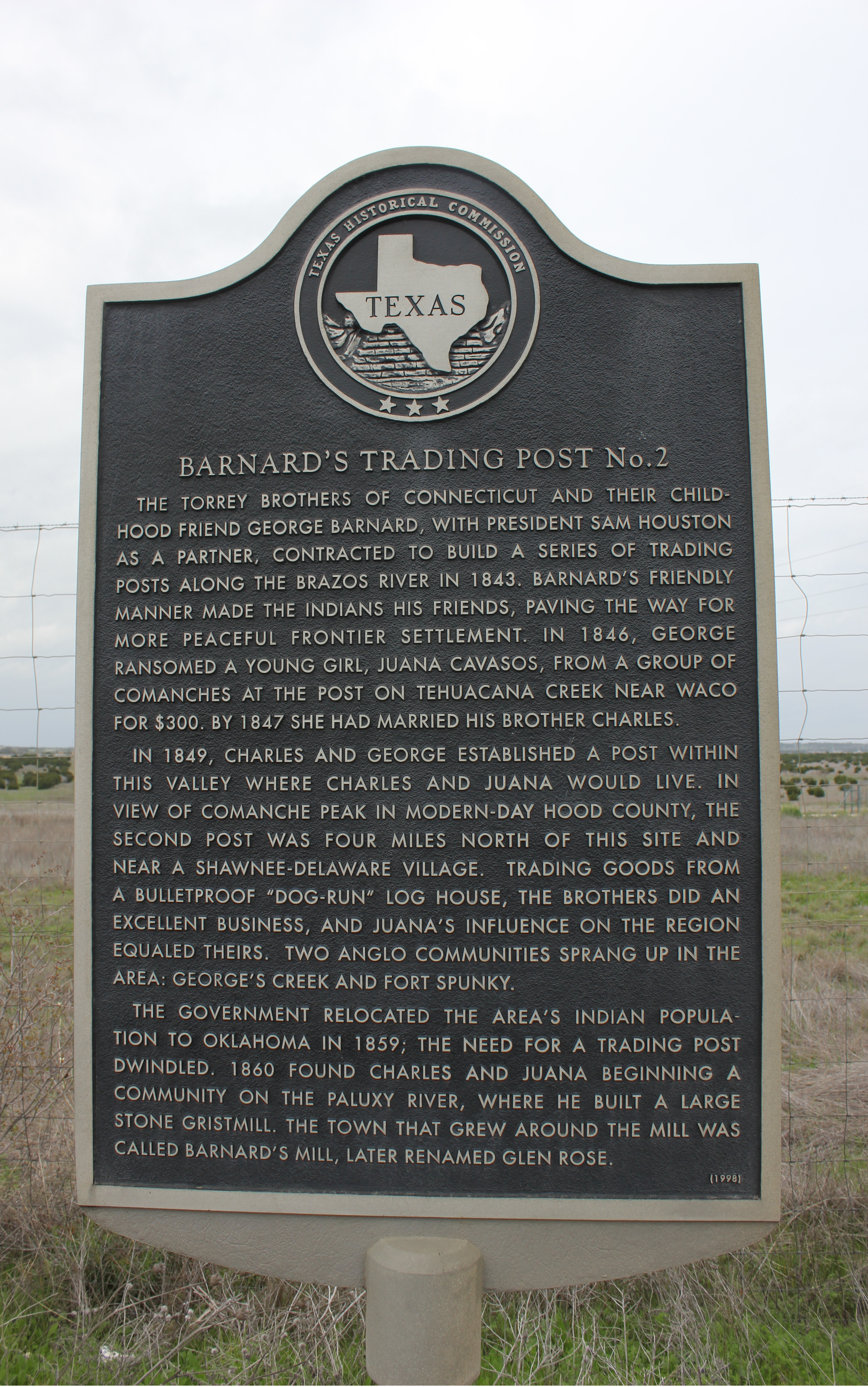
Barnard's Trading Post No. 2

== Capture ==
On 15 August 1844 Cavasos was visiting her friend on the Texas side of the Rio Grande when she and her friend were both taken captive to be used for trade. After about a month the Comanches visited the Tehuacana Creek Trading House operated by George Barnard in north central Texas and traded Cavasos for about $300 in horses and merchandise. Shortly afterwards she married George's brother Charles.

== Later years ==
For the next 15 years Cavasos worked alongside her husband and his brother running the day-to-day operations of the Comanche Peak trading house. Business was reportedly quite good until the native American customers were removed by the United States Government and sent to the Fort Belknap Indian Reservation in Oklahoma.

In 1859 Cavasos and her husband used slave labor to construct the first building, a mill, in present-day Glen Rose, Texas. In the early 1870s they sold the mill for $65,000.

== Legacy ==
There are several plaques and historical markers throughout Texas detailing the accomplishments of Juana and her husband Charles. In Glen Rose, Texas, a statue of them was erected.
