= Squaw Peak =

Squaw Peak may refer to:

== Mountains ==
- Ch-paa-qn Peak, a mountain (formerly known as Squaw Peak) in Missoula County, Montana, United States
- Piestewa Peak, a mountain (formerly known as Squaw Peak) in the Phoenix Mountains range in Phoenix, Arizona, United States
- Beaver Mountain (New York) (formerly known as Squaw Mountain}, a mountain located in the Adirondack Mountains range of New York, United States
- Kyhv Peak (formerly known as Squaw Mountain [official] or Squaw Peak}, a mountain in the Wasatch Range in Provo, Utah, United States
- Washeshu Peak, (formerly known as Squaw Peak), a mountain located in the Sierra Nevada range of California, United States

== Other uses ==
- Squaw Peak Inn, Piestewa Peak, Phoenix, Arizona, USA

== See also ==
- Squaw Cap, New Brunswick, Canada; a mountain and unincorporated community
- Isanaklesh Peaks, Maricopa County, Arizona, USA; a mountain peak formerly known as Squaw Tits
- Anûkathâ Îpa, a mountain peak formerly known as Squaw's Tit in Alberta, Canada
- Squaw (disambiguation)
