= Somervell County, Texas =

County in Texas, United States

- County
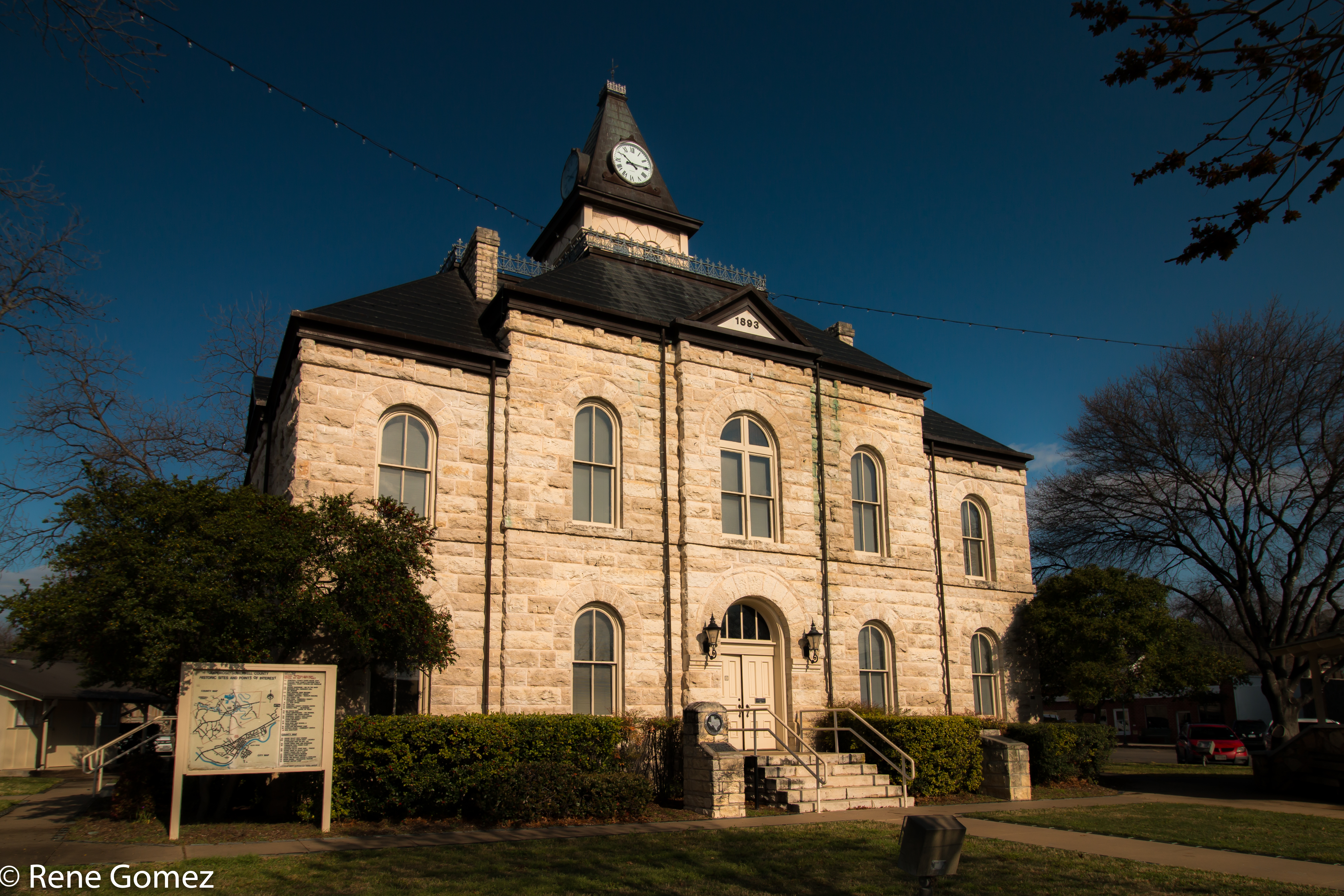
- The Somervell County Courthouse in Glen Rose

- Location within the U.S. state of Texas
- Coordinates: 32°13′N 97°46′W
- Country: United States
- State: Texas
- Founded: 1875
- Named for: Alexander Somervell
- Seat: Glen Rose
- Largest city: Glen Rose

Area
  - Total: 192 sq mi (500 km^{2})
  - Land: 186 sq mi (480 km^{2})
  - Water: 5.5 sq mi (14 km^{2}) 2.9%

Population (2020)
  - Total: 9,205
  - Estimate (2025): 10,261 ▲
  - Density: 49.5/sq mi (19.1/km^{2})
- Time zone: UTC−6 (Central)
  - Summer (DST): UTC−5 (CDT)
- ZIP Codes: 76043
- Area code: 254
- Congressional district: 25th
- Website: www.somervell.co

Somervell County is a county on the Edwards Plateau in the U.S. state of Texas. As of the 2020 census, its population was 9,205. Its county seat is Glen Rose. The county is named for Alexander Somervell, secretary of war for the Republic of Texas.

Somervell County is included in the Granbury micropolitan area.

The county contains the Comanche Peak Nuclear Generating Station, one of two nuclear power plants in Texas.

== History ==
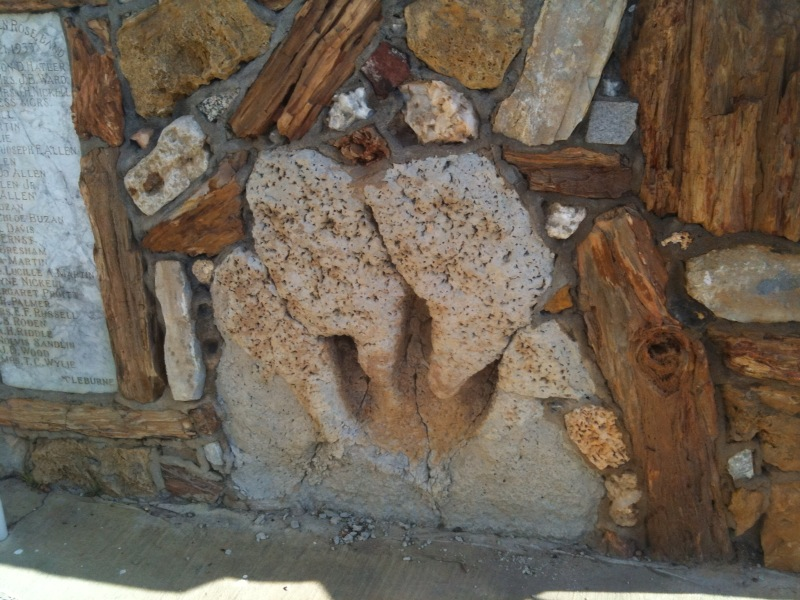
Fossil footprint of a dinosaur displayed on the lawn of the Somervell County Courthouse, Glen Rose, Texas, April 1, 2010

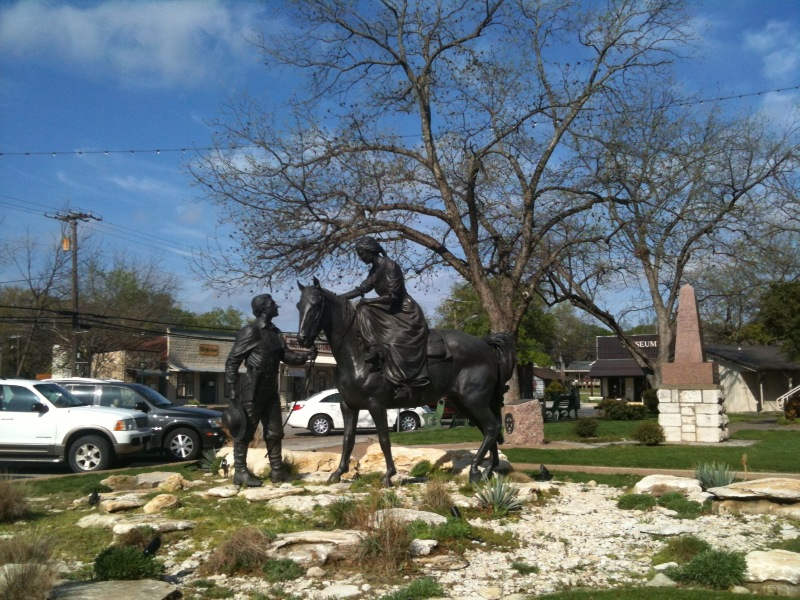
Settlers Memorial bronze work on lawn of the Somervell County Courthouse, April 1, 2010

=== Native Americans ===
Caddo tribe Anadarko villages were scattered along Trinity and Brazos Rivers. The Caddo tribe of Wichita also inhabited the area. By 1860, these tribes had moved to Oklahoma.

The Tonkawa were hunter-gatherers of the area, and often traded with their allies the Caddo and Karankawa. Like the Wichita, Karankawa and Jumano, the Tonkawa tattooed their bodies and faces. Some Tonkawa men were employed as scouts for the Texas Rangers and United States Army. As they were pushed out by the Comanche, they moved to the Brazos Indian Reservation, and later to Oklahoma.

Comanche bands continued depredations on settlers until their removal to Oklahoma after 1875.

=== County established ===
The county was formed and organized in 1875 from Hood County. The town of Glen Rose became the county seat.

Torrey Trading Houses opened as a part of the Sam Houston peace policy to develop friendly relationships with native tribes. They bought from, and sold to, the Indians on a banking and credit system, enabling them to also recover stolen horses and human captives. The Torreys sold their business to George Barnard in 1848, who with his brother Charles moved the Tehuacana store in Limestone County to near Comanche Peak. Juana Josefina Cavasos Barnard had been captured by Comanches as a teenager. She was daughter of Maria Josefa Cavazos, and granddaughter of Don José Narciso Cavazos Gonzalez-Hildago who in 1792 received the largest land grant in Texas. George ransomed Juana from the tribe, but his brother Charles married her in 1848.

Somervell County got its first courthouse in Glen Rose in 1882, but the courthouse and all county records burned in 1893. The second and current courthouse was built in 1894 by architect John McCormick. The roof and clock tower were damaged in the 1902 Glen Rose tornado. County funds at the time limited the repair, which eliminated the clock tower. In 1986, work was done to restore the structure to its original design.

Glen Rose Collegiate Institute, or Glen Rose College, operated as a private, faith-based educational facility from 1889 to 1910. Educational competition from the public-school system caused enrollment to taper off until the institution was shut down.

Under the New Deal Works Progress Administration (WPA), Glen Rose built a new water and sewage system in the 1930s, as well as school buildings, a canning plant, and low-water dams.

The Comanche Peak Nuclear Power Plant went online in the mid-1970s and employs over 1,000 people. Squaw Creek Reservoir, which provides cooling water for the power plant, also has become a popular recreation site.

=== Dinosaurs ===
The tragic Paluxy River flood in 1908 uncovered three-toed prints from the Cretaceous period, possibly Acrocanthosaurus, and were discovered by high school student George Adams in the limestone river bed. The teenager relayed the discovery to his principal, Robert McDonald. Adams later ended up selling self-manufactured fake "giant man tracks" to tourists sometime during the 1930s, sparking a debate about whether humans existed alongside dinosaurs. In 1934, resident Charlie Moss discovered footprints of four-toed sauropods. Resident Jim Ryals dug out the actual dinosaur prints and sold them to tourists. Paleontologist Roland T. Bird of the American Museum of Natural History in New York City spotted the Adams "giant man tracks" in a tourist shop in Gallup, New Mexico, and, while recognizing them as fakes, was still intrigued enough to travel to Somervell County to see the Glen Rose area for himself. Bird's visit resulted in a 2-year WPA project to uncover the dinosaur prints. The American Museum of Natural History, the University of Texas at Austin, the Smithsonian Institution, and several local museums retain samples of what are said to be the best-preserved tracks in the United States.

The land along the Paluxy River for Dinosaur Valley State Park was purchased by the State of Texas in 1968, and the park opened to the public in 1972.

== Geography ==
According to the U.S. Census Bureau, the county has a total area of 192 square miles (500 km^{2}), of which 5.5 square miles (14 km^{2}) (2.9%) are covered by water. It is the second-smallest county by area in Texas, larger than only Rockwall County, and slightly smaller than Camp County.

=== Major highways ===
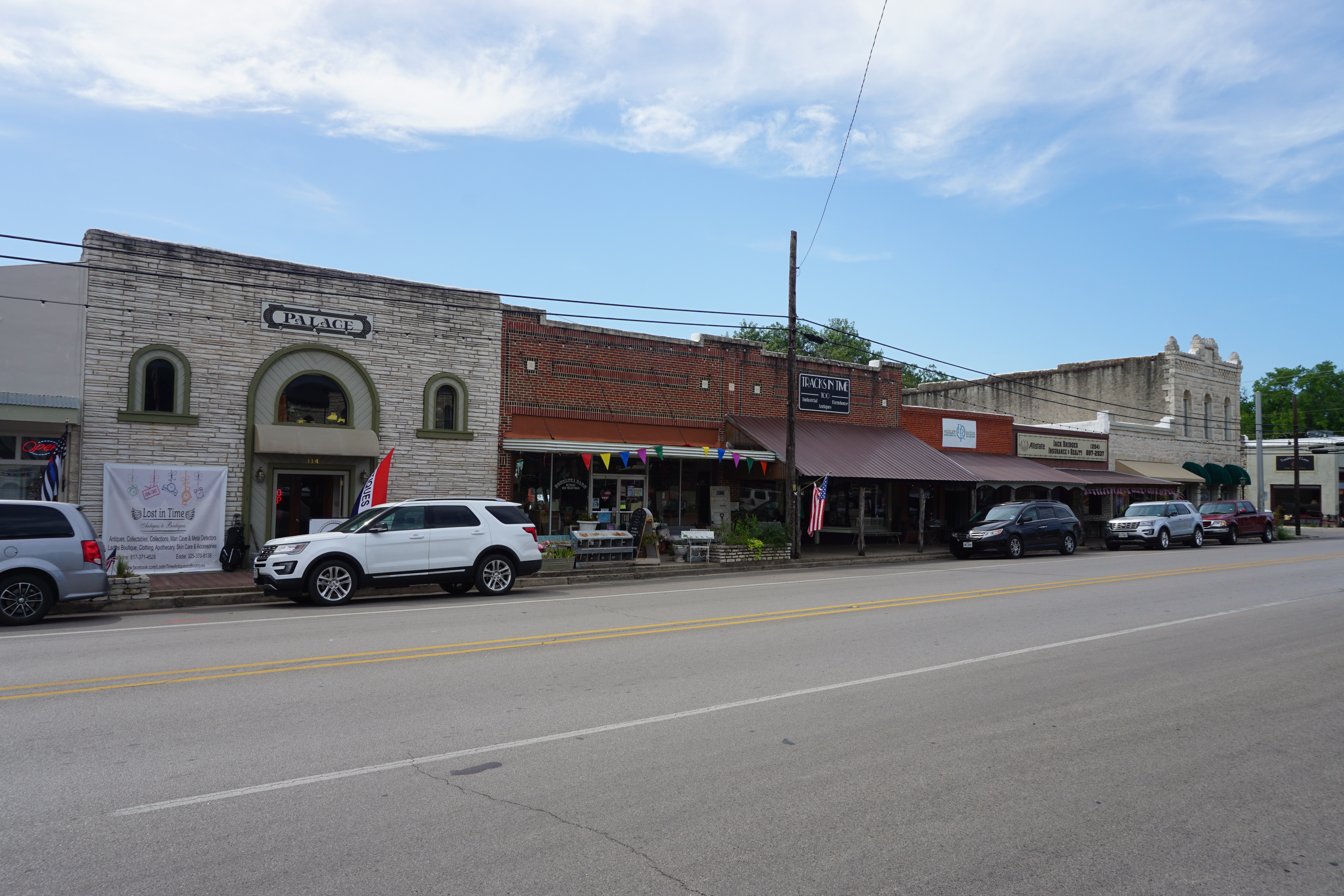
State Highway 144 as NE Barnard Street in Glen Rose

- U.S. Highway 67
- State Highway 144

=== Adjacent counties ===
- Hood County (north)
- Johnson County (east)
- Bosque County (south)
- Erath County (west)

== Demographics ==
Historical population
Census	Pop.	Note	%±
1880	2,649		—
1890	3,419		29.1%
1900	3,498		2.3%
1910	3,931		12.4%
1920	3,563		−9.4%
1930	3,016		−15.4%
1940	3,071		1.8%
1950	2,542		−17.2%
1960	2,577		1.4%
1970	2,793		8.4%
1980	4,154		48.7%
1990	5,360		29.0%
2000	6,809		27.0%
2010	8,490		24.7%
2020	9,205		8.4%
2025 (est.)	10,261	▲	11.5%
U.S. Decennial Census; 1850–2010 2010 2020

=== Racial and ethnic composition ===
Somervell County, Texas – Racial and ethnic composition Note: the US Census treats Hispanic/Latino as an ethnic category. This table excludes Latinos from the racial categories and assigns them to a separate category. Hispanics/Latinos may be of any race.
Race / Ethnicity (NH = Non-Hispanic)	Pop 1980	Pop 1990	Pop 2000	Pop 2010	Pop 2020	% 1980	% 1990	% 2000	% 2010	% 2020
White alone (NH)	3,821	4,547	5,763	6,595	7,011	91.98%	84.83%	84.64%	77.68%	76.17%
Black or African American alone (NH)	3	10	13	54	39	0.07%	0.19%	0.19%	0.64%	0.42%
Native American or Alaska Native alone (NH)	26	34	39	45	49	0.63%	0.63%	0.57%	0.53%	0.53%
Asian alone (NH)	10	18	17	40	55	0.24%	0.34%	0.25%	0.47%	0.60%
Native Hawaiian or Pacific Islander alone (NH)	x	x	0	1	0	x	x	0.00%	0.01%	0.00%
Other race alone (NH)	7	2	4	24	33	0.17%	0.04%	0.06%	0.28%	0.36%
Mixed race or Multiracial (NH)	x	x	58	105	331	x	x	0.85%	1.24%	3.60%
Hispanic or Latino (any race)	287	749	915	1,626	1,687	6.91%	13.97%	13.44%	19.15%	18.33%
Total	4,154	5,360	6,809	8,490	9,205	100.00%	100.00%	100.00%	100.00%	100.00%

=== 2020 census ===
As of the 2020 census, the county had a population of 9,205 and the median age was 43.3 years; 24.3% of residents were under 18 and 20.5% were 65 or older. For every 100 females, there were 94.9 males, and for every 100 females 18 and over, there were 93.7 males 18 and over.

The racial makeup of the county was 80.1% White, 0.5% Black or African American, 0.8% American Indian and Alaska Native, 0.6% Asian, <0.1% Native Hawaiian and Pacific Islander, 5.8% from some other race, and 12.1% from two or more races. Hispanic or Latino residents of any race comprised 18.3% of the population.

About 0.1% of residents lived in urban areas, while the rest lived in rural areas.

Of the 3,411 households in the county, 33.9% had children under 18 living in them, 60.0% were married-couple households, 14.9% were households with a male householder and no spouse or partner present, and 21.5% were households with a female householder and no spouse or partner present. About 21.5% of all households were made up of individuals, and 10.5% had someone living alone who was 65 or older.

The county had 3,928 housing units, of which 13.2% were vacant. Among occupied housing units, 77.9% were owner-occupied and 22.1% were renter-occupied. The homeowner vacancy rate was 1.7% and the rental vacancy rate was 10.4%.

=== 2010 census ===
As of the 2010 census, about 1.3 same-sex couples per 1,000 households were in the county.

=== 2000 census ===
As of the census of 2000, 6,809 people, 2,438 households, and 1,840 families were residing in the county. The population density was 36 people/mi^{2} (14 people/km^{2}). The 2,750 housing units had an average density of 15 units per square mile (5.8 units/km^{2}). The racial makeup of the county was 92.19% White, 0.28% African American, 0.69% Native American, 0.26% Asian, 5.12% from other races, and 1.45% from two or more races. About 13.44% of the population were Hispanics or Latinos of any race.

Of the 2,438 households, 37.4% had children under 18 living with them, 61.7% were married couples living together, 9.6% had a female householder with no husband present, and 24.5% were not families. About 21.3% of all households were made up of individuals, and 9.2% had someone living alone who was 65 or older. The average household size was 2.73, and the average family size was 3.17.

In the county, the age distribution was 28.4% under 18, 7.7% from 18 to 24, 26.8% from 25 to 44, 23.7% from 45 to 64, and 13.3% who were 65 or older. The median age was 37 years. For every 100 females, there were 99.6 males. For every 100 females 18 and over, there were 95.9 males.

The median income in the county for a household was $39,404 and for a family was $46,458. Males had a median income of $32,463 versus $23,381 for females. The per capita income for the county was $18,367. About 6.10% of families and 8.60% of the population were below the poverty line, including 10.30% of those under 18 and 9.10% of those 65 or over.

== Media ==
One newspaper has an office located in Somervell County, the Glen Rose Reporter. Local television stations that provide coverage for the area broadcast from the Dallas-Fort Worth and the Waco/Temple/Killeen (Central Texas) metropolitan areas.

== Communities ==
=== City ===
- Glen Rose (county seat)

=== Unincorporated communities ===
- Glass
- Nemo
- Rainbow

== Politics ==
Somervell County has voted for the Republican Party in all presidential elections since 1984, except in 1992, when it was one of the few counties nationwide to vote for the independent candidate Ross Perot who beat George H. W. Bush by a mere 42 votes.

United States presidential election results for Somervell County, Texas
Year	Republican		Democratic		Third party(ies)	
Year	No.	%	No.	%	No.	%
1912	12	3.16%	241	63.42%	127	33.42%
1916	20	5.24%	278	72.77%	84	21.99%
1920	92	24.60%	198	52.94%	84	22.46%
1924	42	8.96%	403	85.93%	24	5.12%
1928	241	63.93%	136	36.07%	0	0.00%
1932	43	6.89%	561	89.90%	20	3.21%
1936	57	15.08%	317	83.86%	4	1.06%
1940	138	20.60%	532	79.40%	0	0.00%
1944	87	14.01%	406	65.38%	128	20.61%
1948	91	15.61%	446	76.50%	46	7.89%
1952	494	51.84%	450	47.22%	9	0.94%
1956	467	59.80%	309	39.56%	5	0.64%
1960	441	55.13%	345	43.13%	14	1.75%
1964	210	24.59%	641	75.06%	3	0.35%
1968	313	34.74%	384	42.62%	204	22.64%
1972	703	71.23%	284	28.77%	0	0.00%
1976	332	23.87%	1,054	75.77%	5	0.36%
1980	792	42.76%	1,015	54.81%	45	2.43%
1984	1,422	69.00%	635	30.81%	4	0.19%
1988	1,304	56.79%	983	42.81%	9	0.39%
1992	872	33.96%	782	30.45%	914	35.59%
1996	1,099	46.23%	993	41.78%	285	11.99%
2000	2,120	72.65%	752	25.77%	46	1.58%
2004	2,701	76.06%	831	23.40%	19	0.54%
2008	2,677	75.77%	799	22.62%	57	1.61%
2012	2,871	81.15%	613	17.33%	54	1.53%
2016	3,206	82.27%	541	13.88%	150	3.85%
2020	4,105	82.81%	768	15.49%	84	1.69%
2024	4,493	84.87%	751	14.19%	50	0.94%

United States Senate election results for Somervell County, Texas1
Year	Republican		Democratic		Third party(ies)	
Year	No.	%	No.	%	No.	%
2024	4,298	81.46%	859	16.28%	119	2.26%

United States Senate election results for Somervell County, Texas2
Year	Republican		Democratic		Third party(ies)	
Year	No.	%	No.	%	No.	%
2020	4,103	83.38%	712	14.47%	106	2.15%

Texas Gubernatorial election results for Somervell County
Year	Republican		Democratic		Third party(ies)	
Year	No.	%	No.	%	No.	%
2022	3,430	84.90%	553	13.69%	57	1.41%

== See also ==
- National Register of Historic Places listings in Somervell County, Texas
- Recorded Texas Historic Landmarks in Somervell County
