= 1960 United States Senate election in Texas =

- November 8, 1960
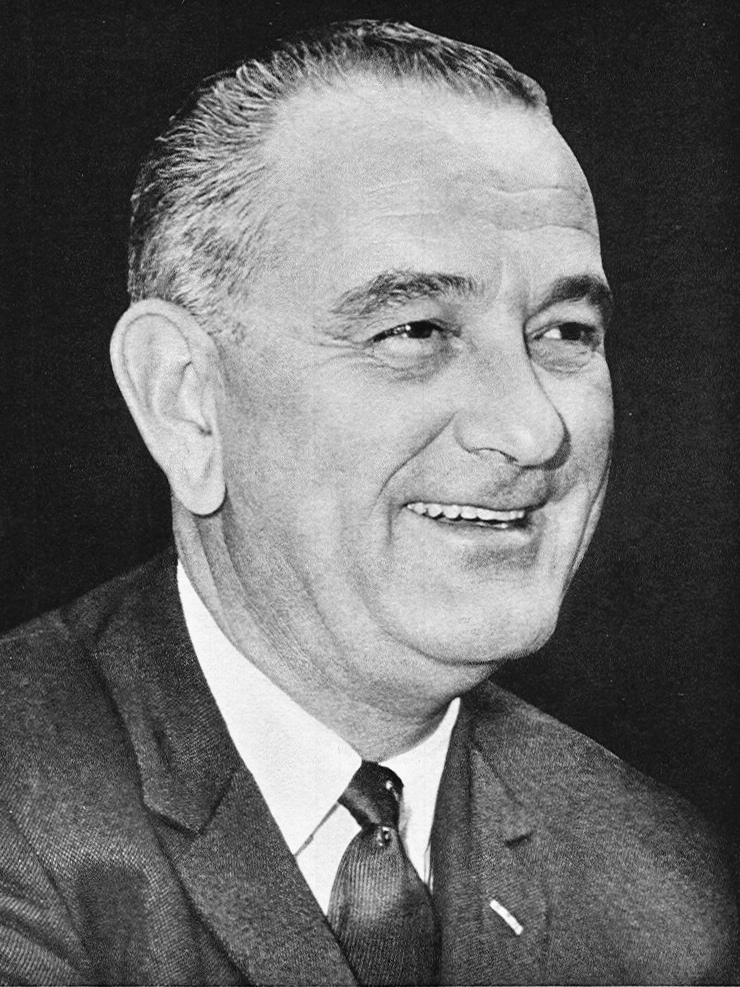

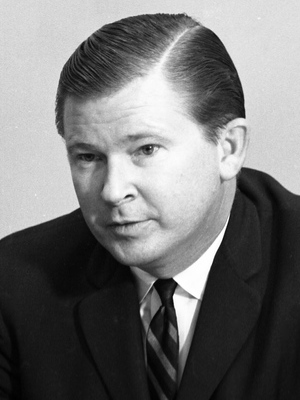
| Nominee | Lyndon B. Johnson | John Tower |
| Party | Democratic | Republican |
| Popular vote | 1,306,625 | 926,653 |
| Percentage | 57.98% | 41.12% |
- Johnson: 50–60% 60–70% 70–80% 80–90% >90% Tower: 50–60% 60–70%
U.S. senator before election
Lyndon B. Johnson
Democratic
Elected U.S. Senator
Lyndon B. Johnson
(did not take office)
Democratic

The 1960 United States Senate election in Texas was held on November 8, 1960. Incumbent Democratic U.S. Senator Lyndon B. Johnson, who was simultaneously running for Vice President of the United States, was re-elected to a third term in office. Johnson had Texas law changed to allow him to run for both offices at once. This was the last time the Democrats won the Class 2 Senate seat in Texas until 2026.

Johnson spent much of the year focused on his other campaigns. First, his unsuccessful campaign for the Democratic nomination for President ended in defeat at the hands of John F. Kennedy at the July Democratic National Convention. At the convention, Kennedy chose Johnson as his running mate.

== General election ==
=== Results ===
1960 United States Senate election in Texas
| Party | Candidate | Votes | % |
|---|---|---|---|
| Democratic | Lyndon B. Johnson (incumbent) | 1,306,625 | 57.98% |
| Republican | John Tower | 926,653 | 41.12% |
| Constitution | Bard A. Logan | 20,506 | 0.91% |
| Total votes | | 2,253,784 | 100.00% |
| Democratic hold | | | |

Johnson carried his Senate seat quite easily, although in the presidential race, the Kennedy-Johnson ticket won the state over the Republican Nixon-Lodge ticket by only two percentage points.

Because the Kennedy-Johnson ticket was victorious in the presidential race, Johnson never took office for his third term. Instead, William Blakley was appointed to fill the vacancy and a special election was scheduled for May 1961. Johnson's opponent in this race, John Tower, went on to win the special election over Blakley.

== See also ==
- 1960 United States Senate elections
