= Tahc'a Okute Wakpa =

Stream in Oglala Lakota County, South Dakota, U.S.

Coordinates: 43.6138°N 102.9574°W

Tahc'a Okute Wakpa is a stream in Oglala Lakota County, South Dakota, in the United States.

In the Lakota language, tahc'a okute means "deer-hunting grounds" and wakpa means a stream or river.

The stream was previously known as Squaw-Humper Creek, reputedly named for a local white man who had a live-in Native American girlfriend (squaw). The term "squaw-humper" was cited as "contemptuous" as early as 1940, and was removed from federal usage by a decision of the Board on Geographic Names in 2015.

== See also ==
- Squaw Humper Dam
- List of rivers of South Dakota
