= John Tower =

American politician and veteran (1925–1991)

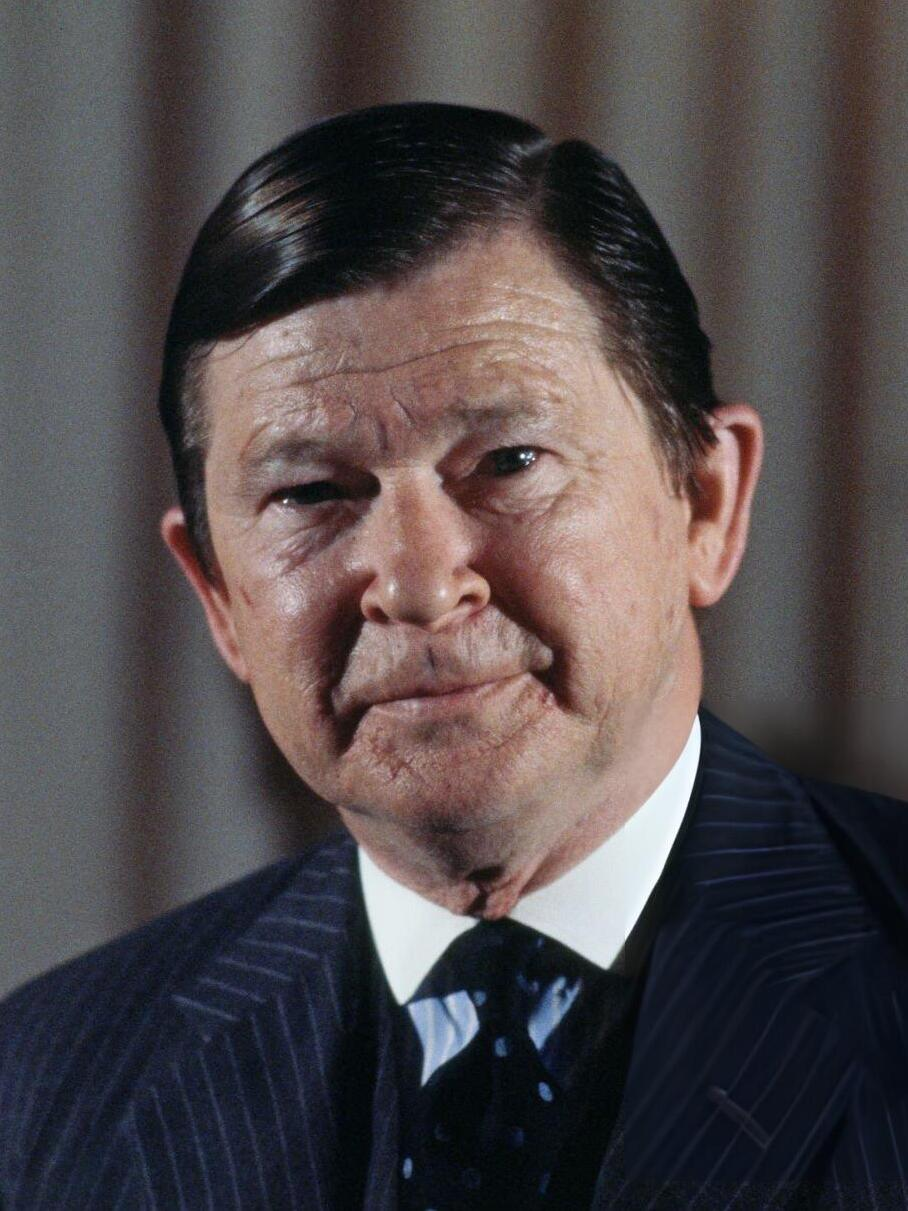
- Tower in 1978

Chair of the President's Intelligence Advisory Board
- In office July 17, 1990 – April 5, 1991
- President: George H. W. Bush
- Preceded by: Anne Armstrong
- Succeeded by: Bobby Inman (acting)

United States Senator from Texas
- In office June 15, 1961 – January 3, 1985
- Preceded by: Bill Blakley
- Succeeded by: Phil Gramm
Senate positions
Chair of the Senate Armed Services Committee
In office January 3, 1981 – January 3, 1985
Preceded by	John C. Stennis
Succeeded by	Barry Goldwater
Chair of the Senate Republican Policy Committee
In office January 3, 1973 – January 3, 1985
Leader	Hugh Scott; Howard Baker; Ted Stevens (acting); Howard Baker
Preceded by	Gordon Allott
Succeeded by	William L. Armstrong
Chair of the National Republican Senatorial Committee
In office January 3, 1969 – January 3, 1971
Leader	Everett Dirksen; Hugh Scott
Preceded by	George Murphy
Succeeded by	Peter H. Dominick

Personal details
- Born: John Goodwin Tower; September 29, 1925 Houston, Texas, U.S.
- Died: April 5, 1991 (aged 65) Brunswick, Georgia, U.S.
- Party: Republican (1951–1991)
- Other political affiliations: Democratic (before 1951)
- Spouses: Lou Bullington (m. 1952; div. 1976) Lilla Cummings (m. 1977; div. 1987)
- Children: 3
- Education: Southwestern University (BA); Southern Methodist University (MA); London School of Economics

Military service
- Allegiance: United States
- Branch/service: United States Navy; Navy Reserve
- Years of service: 1943–1946 (active); 1946-1989 (reserve)
- Rank: Master Chief Petty Officer
- Battles/wars: World War II; Pacific Theater

John Goodwin Tower (September 29, 1925 – April 5, 1991) was an American politician and military veteran who represented Texas in the United States Senate from 1961 to 1985. He was the first Republican elected to the U.S. Senate from Texas since Reconstruction. Tower is known for leading the Tower Commission, which investigated the Iran-Contra Affair in the Reagan administration.

Born in Houston, Texas, Tower served in the Pacific Theater of World War II. After the war, he worked as a radio announcer and taught at Midwestern University (now Midwestern State University) in Wichita Falls. He switched from the Democratic Party to the Republican Party in the early 1950s and worked on the 1956 presidential campaign of Dwight D. Eisenhower. Tower lost Texas's 1960 Senate election to Democratic senator Lyndon B. Johnson, but performed relatively well compared to his Republican predecessors. With the Democratic victory in the 1960 presidential election, Johnson vacated his Senate seat to become Vice President of the United States. In the 1961 special election, Tower defeated Johnson's appointed successor, Bill Blakley. He won re-election in 1966, 1972, and 1978.

Upon joining the Senate in 1961, Tower became the first Republican senator to represent Texas in over 80 years. He was the only Southern Republican in the Senate until Strom Thurmond switched parties in 1964. A political conservative earlier in his career, Tower staunchly opposed the Civil Rights Act of 1964 and the Voting Rights Act of 1965. Starting in 1976 with his support of Gerald Ford rather than Ronald Reagan in the 1976 Republican primaries, Tower began to alienate many fellow conservatives. He became less conservative over time, later voicing support for legal abortion and opposing Reagan's Strategic Defense Initiative in 1983.

Tower retired from the Senate in 1985. After leaving Congress, he served as chief negotiator of the Strategic Arms Reduction Talks with the Soviet Union and led the Tower Commission. The commission's report was highly critical of the Reagan administration's relations with Iran and the Contras. In 1989, incoming president George H. W. Bush chose Tower as his nominee for United States Secretary of Defense, but his nomination was rejected by the Senate. After the defeat, Tower chaired the President's Intelligence Advisory Board. Tower died in the 1991 Atlantic Southeast Airlines Flight 2311 crash.

== Early life, education, and military service ==
Tower was born in Houston, the son of Joe Z. Tower (1898–1970) and Beryl Goodwin Tower (1898–1990). The family often moved throughout East Texas due to Joe's career as a Methodist minister.

Having attended public schools in Houston and Beaumont, Texas, Tower graduated from Beaumont High School in 1942. After high school, he enrolled at Southwestern University in fall 1942. In June 1943, Tower paused his college studies to serve in the United States Navy during the Pacific Theater of World War II on an LCS(L) amphibious gunboat.

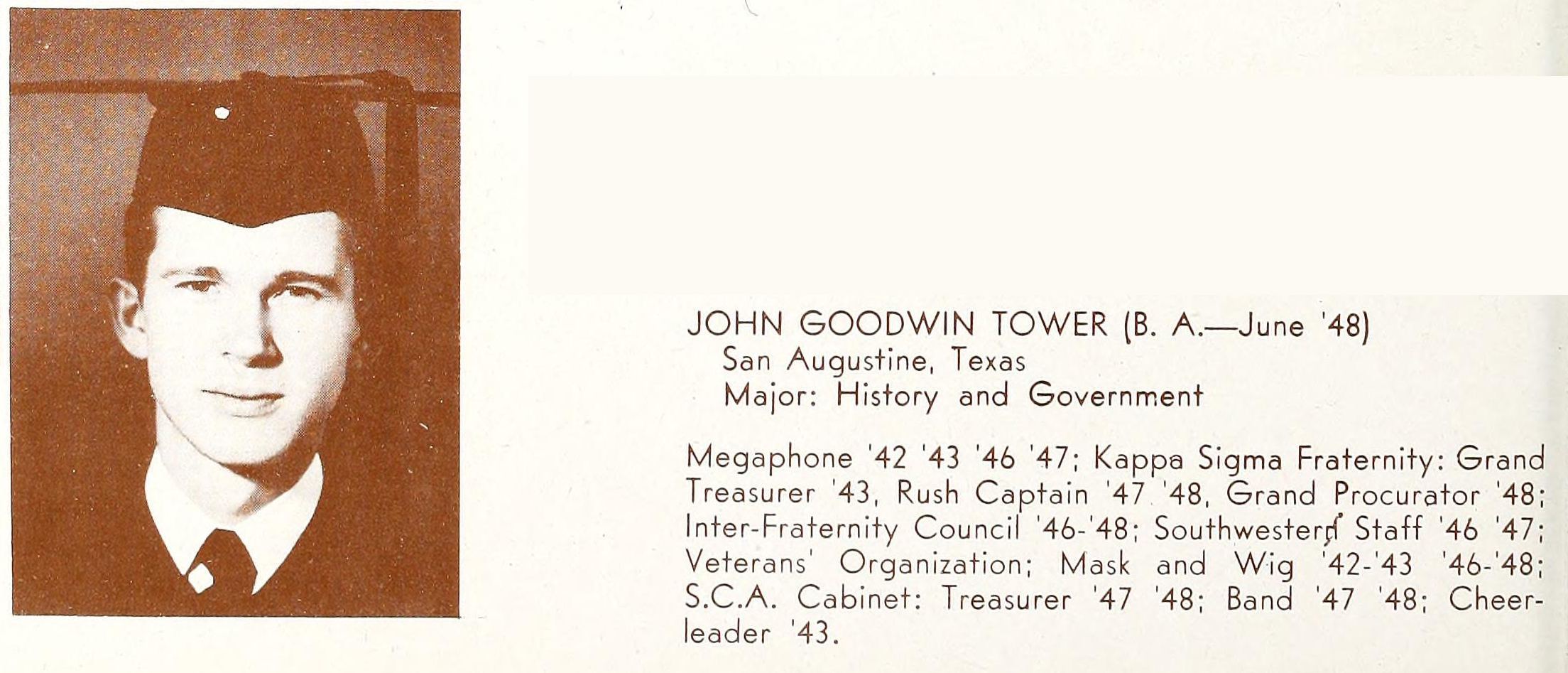
Tower in the Southwestern University yearbook, 1948

In March 1946, Tower was discharged from the Navy ranked seaman first class and resumed his studies at Southwestern. He graduated in 1948 with a Bachelor of Arts degree in political science. While at Southwestern, Tower was a member of the Iota chapter of Kappa Sigma fraternity, and would later serve the organization in significant alumnus volunteer roles.

Tower worked as a radio announcer for country music station KTAE in Taylor, northeast of Austin, during college and for some time afterward. Tower continued his military service in the United States Naval Reserve until retiring in 1989 with the rank of master chief's boatswain mate.

In 1949, he began graduate studies in political science at Southern Methodist University and worked part time as an insurance agent. Then in 1951, Tower became an assistant professor of political science at Midwestern University (now Midwestern State University), a job he held until 1960. In 1952 and 1953, he pursued graduate coursework at the London School of Economics and conducted field research on the organization of the Conservative Party of the United Kingdom. His research was presented in his thesis, The Conservative Worker in Britain. He received his Master of Arts degree from SMU in 1953.

== Early political career ==
Although raised as a Southern Democrat, Tower became a Republican in college about 1951. He rose quickly through the ranks of the Texas Republican Party; he was an unsuccessful candidate for representative to the Texas House of Representatives for the 18th district in 1954. He was a delegate to the 1956 Republican National Convention. In the 1956 presidential election, he was the campaign manager for Dwight D. Eisenhower in the 23rd Senatorial District.

=== 1960 Senate election ===
In 1960, he was chosen by the state convention held in McAllen in Hidalgo County in south Texas, as the Republican candidate for the United States Senate against Lyndon Johnson. Two other Republicans mentioned for the senatorial nomination, Thad Hutcheson, who had sought Texas's other Senate seat in a special election in 1957, and Bruce Alger, the only Republican congressman from Texas at the time, were both uninterested.

Johnson, the incumbent senator and famous nationwide as the Senate Majority Leader, won the election against Tower. As John F. Kennedy's running mate, Johnson was also seeking the vice presidency in the same election. Tower's campaign slogan was "double your pleasure, double your fun — vote against Johnson two times, not one."

=== 1961 Senate election ===
After Johnson became vice president, Tower ran in the special election held to determine who would fill Johnson's seat in the Senate. Tower came first in the initial round of voting with 30.93% of the vote, and subsequently won the run-off election against Democrat William A. Blakley, who had been appointed as interim senator, with 50.6% of the vote to Blakley's 49.4%. Tower became the first Republican elected to the Senate from Texas since 1870.

== United States Senate ==
=== Committee assignments ===
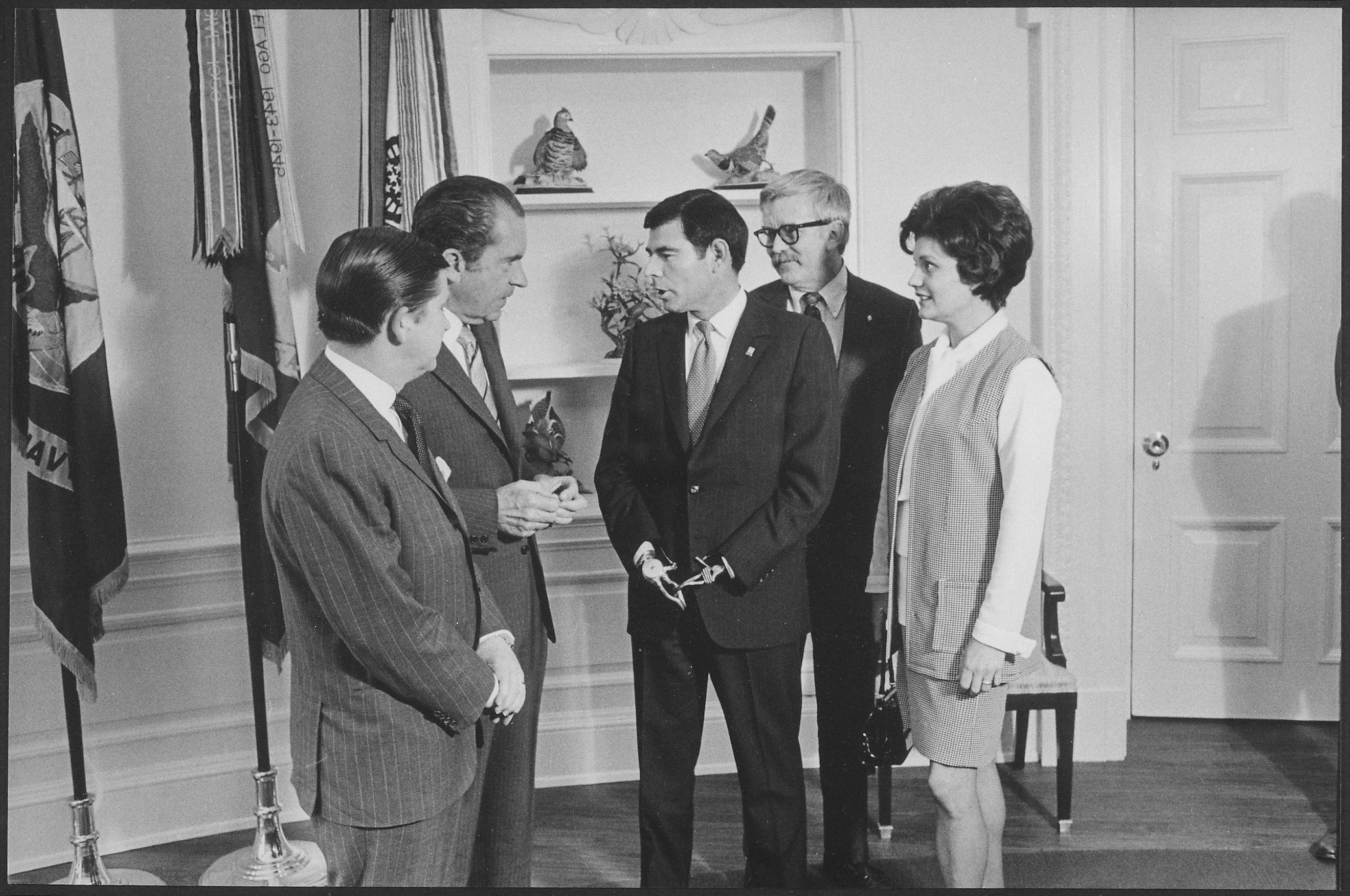
Tower with President Richard Nixon on May 5, 1971.

In the Senate, Tower was assigned to two major committees: the Labor and Public Welfare Committee and the Committee on Banking, Housing, and Urban Affairs. Tower left the Labor and Public Welfare Committee in 1964, although in 1965 he was named to the Senate Armed Services Committee, in which he served until his retirement. He was chairman of the Armed Services Committee from 1981 to 1984. Tower also served on the Joint Committee on Defense Production from 1963 until 1977 and on the Senate Republican Policy Committee in 1962 and from 1969 until 1984. Tower served as chairman of the latter from 1973 until his retirement from the Senate. As a member and later chairman of the Armed Services Committee, Tower was a strong proponent of modernizing the armed forces. In the Banking and Currency Committee, he was a champion of small businesses and worked to improve the national infrastructure and financial institutions. Tower supported Texas economic interests, working to improve the business environment of the energy, agricultural, and fishing and maritime sectors.

=== Civil rights ===
Tower was a leading opponent of the Civil Rights Act of 1964 and the Voting Rights Act of 1965 and voted against both bills, as well as the 24th Amendment to the U.S. Constitution, but he did not vote on the Civil Rights Act of 1968 and voted in favor of the confirmation of Thurgood Marshall to the U.S. Supreme Court.

Although opposing the final passage of the Civil Rights Act of 1964, Tower also voted against an amendment by Albert Gore Sr. that sought to weaken the legislation. He stated:

Mr. President, the motion is merely another assault on title VI, which I believe is a good provision of the bill. I think that if we had enacted a separate measure containing the provisions in title VI some time ago, we would not be asked to enact some of the other measures which we are asked to enact today. I believe that if people in the States and localities are going to accept Federal money and Federal support, they must not engage in any kind of discrimination which is contrary to Federal policy. Therefore I intend to vote against the motion of the Senator from Tennessee.

Later in the 1970's, Tower co-sponsored legislation honoring African-American civil rights leaders Roy Wilkins and Clarence Mitchell Jr., and supported gay rights legislation.

== Post-Senate career ==
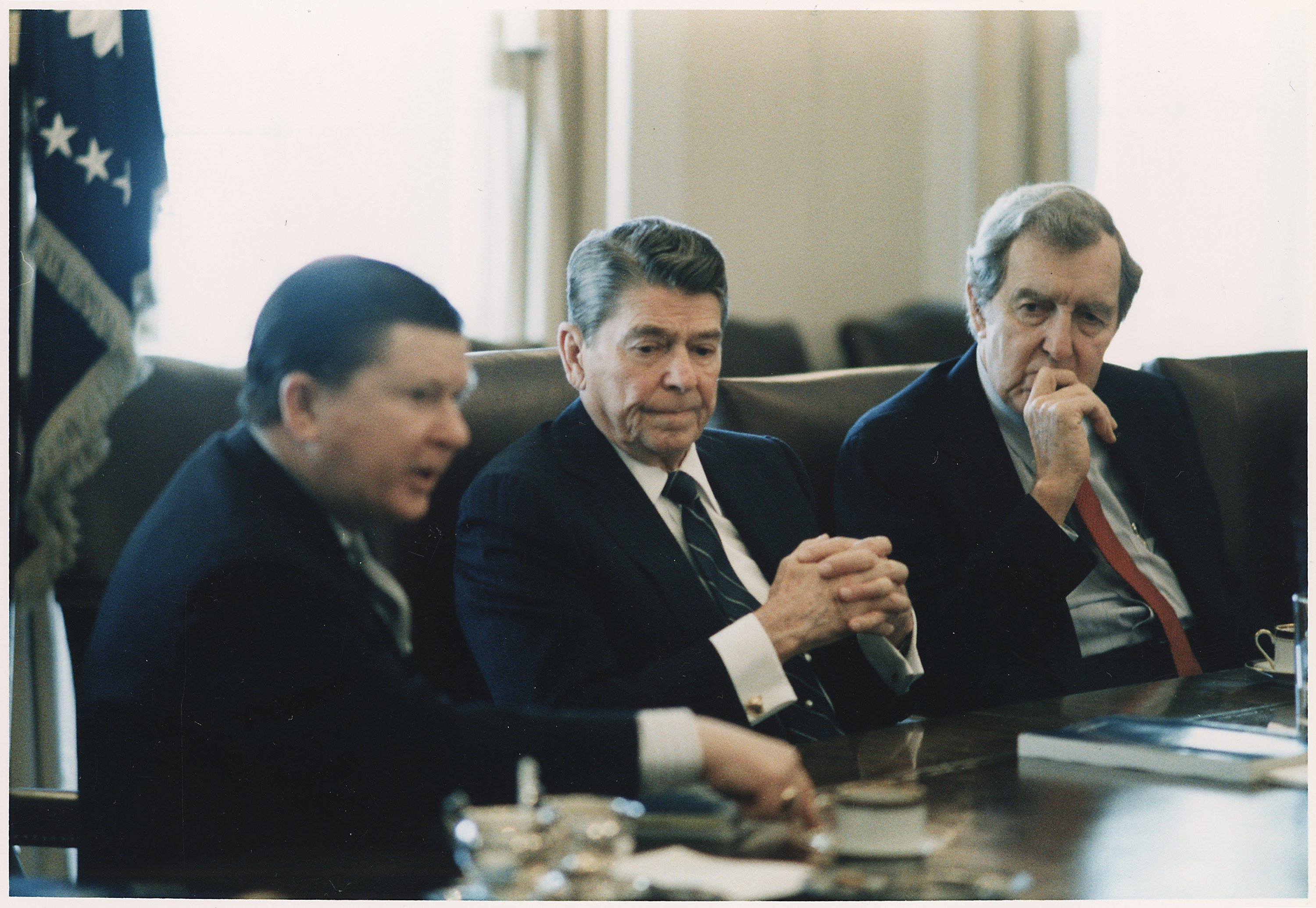
Tower delivers the Tower Report to President Reagan in the White House Cabinet Room, Edmund Muskie at right, 1987.

According to The Assassination of Robert Maxwell: Israel's Superspy by Gordon Thomas and Martin Dillon, Tower became the liaison for Robert Maxwell, a British publishing mogul and super-agent for Mossad, to the White House and to US government operations. The relationship began in 1984, and the soon-to-be retired Tower "told Maxwell that his fee as Maxwell's personal consultant would be $200,000." Tower received his fee in four separate payments of $50,000 into a Swiss bank account. Tower arranged for Maxwell to meet with leadership of Sandia National Laboratories, a US nuclear lab. Maxwell sold to Sandia a copy of PROMIS software that had a backdoor which was accessible by Israeli intelligence, giving nuclear details to Israel. Shortly after retirement from the Senate, in 1985, Tower took Maxwell's request for American help in arming Iran, and relayed it to President Reagan as a means to trade for American hostages held in Lebanon. "Two days later the former Senator reported to Maxwell that his meeting with President Reagan had produced a positive response."

Tower retired from the Senate in 1985 after nearly twenty-four years in office. He continued to be involved in national politics, advising the campaigns of Ronald Reagan and George H. W. Bush. Two weeks after his leaving office, Tower was named chief United States negotiator at the Strategic Arms Reduction Talks in Geneva, Switzerland. Tower resigned from this office in 1987, and for a time was a professor at Southern Methodist University. He became a consultant with Tower, Eggers, and Greene Consulting from 1987 until his death in 1991.

In November 1986, President Reagan asked Tower to chair the President's Special Review Board to study the action of the National Security Council and its staff during the Iran–Contra affair. The board, which became known as the Tower Commission, issued its report on February 26, 1987. The report was highly critical of the Reagan administration and of the National Security Council's dealings with both Iran and the Nicaraguan Contras.

=== Rejected by the Senate for Secretary of Defense, 1989 ===
In 1989, Tower was President George H. W. Bush's choice to become Secretary of Defense. In a stunning move, particularly since Tower was himself a former Senate colleague, the Senate rejected his nomination. The largest factors were concern about possible conflicts of interest and Tower's personal life, in particular allegations of alcohol abuse and womanizing. The Senate vote was 47–53, and it marked the first time that the Senate had rejected a Cabinet nominee of a newly elected president.

As The New York Times reported in his obituary, "Mr. Tower's repudiation by his former colleagues, who rejected him as Bush's nominee for Secretary of Defense after public allegations of womanizing and heavy drinking, left a bitterness that could not be assuaged. In the normally clubby Senate, Mr. Tower was regarded by some colleagues as a gut fighter who did not suffer fools gladly, and some lawmakers indicated that they were only too pleased to rebuke him."

In response to the alcohol allegations, Tower told The New York Times in 1990: "Have I ever drunk to excess? Yes. Am I alcohol-dependent? No. Have I always been a good boy? Of course not. But I've never done anything disqualifying. That's the point." The FBI background check indicated that Tower was not an alcoholic but had abused alcohol, albeit with much diminished, sporadic consumption beginning in 1983.

After Tower's defeat, he was named chairman of the President's Foreign Intelligence Advisory Board. Future vice president Dick Cheney, then a representative from Wyoming and the House Minority Whip, was later confirmed as Secretary of Defense.

== Personal life ==
While a professor at Midwestern State University, Tower met Joza Lou Bullington, whom he married in 1952. A native of San Diego, California, Lou was reared in Wichita Falls and was the organist at the Towers' church.

John and Lou Tower had three children during their years in Wichita Falls born in three consecutive years: Penny (1954), Marian (1955–1991), and Jeanne (1956). The couple divorced in 1976. Following his divorce from Lou, Tower married Lilla Burt Cummings in 1977. The couple separated in 1985 and divorced on July 2, 1986.

== Death and legacy ==
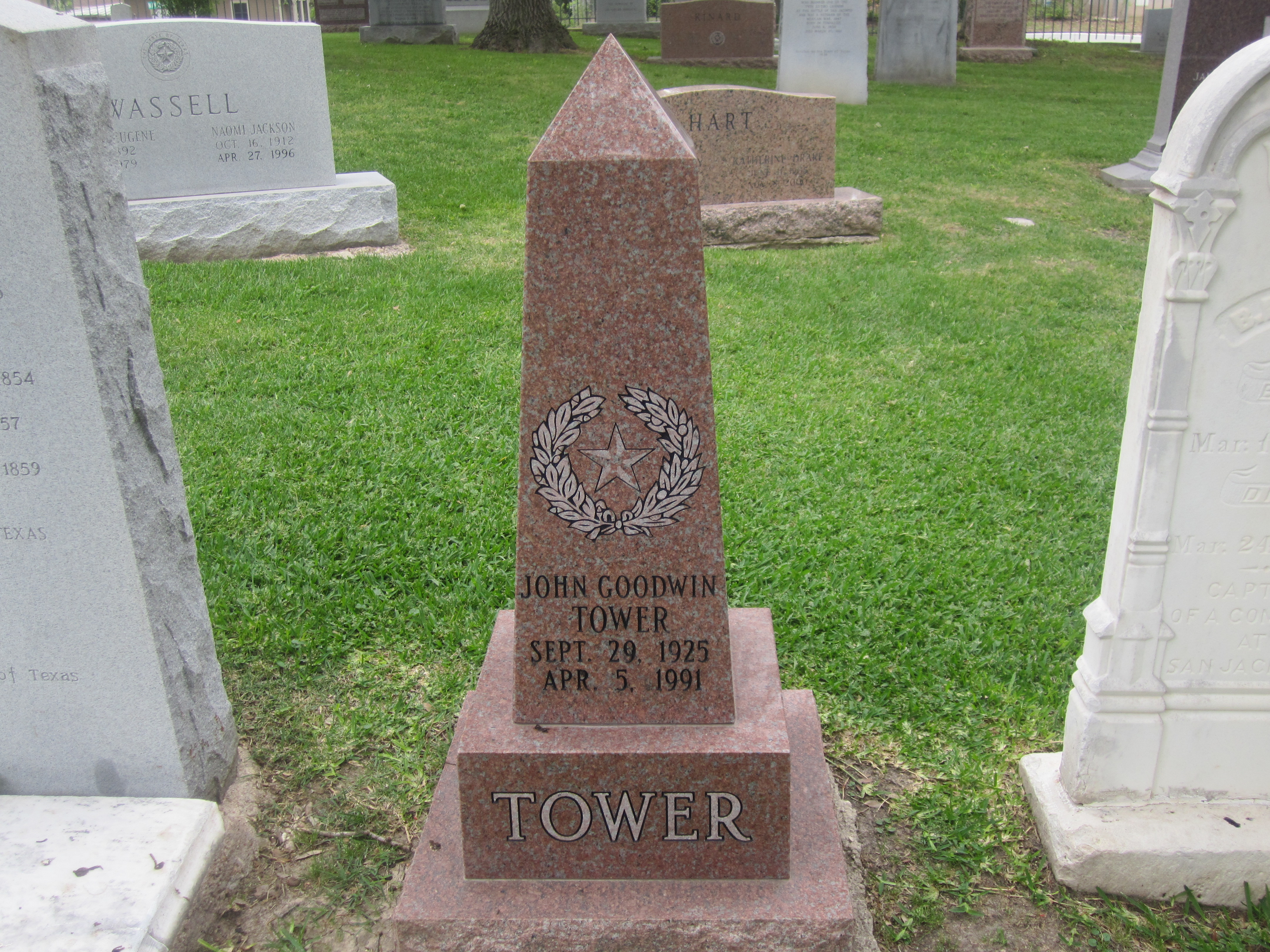
John Tower cenotaph at the Texas State Cemetery in Austin, Texas

On April 5, 1991, Tower was aboard Atlantic Southeast Airlines Flight 2311 when it crashed while on approach for landing at Brunswick, Georgia. The crash instantly killed everyone on board, including Tower and his middle daughter, Marian, astronaut Sonny Carter, and twenty others. An investigation determined that the crash resulted from failure of the plane's propeller control unit.

Tower and his daughter are buried together at the family plot of the Sparkman-Hillcrest Memorial Park Cemetery in Dallas. A cenotaph in Tower's honor was erected at the Texas State Cemetery in Austin. Tower's life is chronicled in his autobiography, Consequences: A Personal and Political Memoir, published a few months before his death. He donated his papers to his alma mater, Southwestern University.

== See also ==
- Tower Amendment
- Unsuccessful nominations to the Cabinet of the United States
- List of members of the American Legion

Party political offices
Preceded by Carlos Watson	Republican nominee for U.S. Senator from Texas (Class 2); 1960, 1961, 1966, 1972, 1978	Succeeded by Phil Gramm
Preceded by Everett Dirksen; Gerald Ford	Response to the State of the Union address 1968; Served alongside: Howard Baker, George H. W. Bush, Peter Dominick, Gerald Ford, Robert Griffin, Thomas Kuchel, Mel Laird, Bob Mathias, George Murphy, Dick Poff, Chuck Percy, Al Quie, Charlotte Reid, Hugh Scott, Bill Steiger	Vacant Title next held by Donald Fraser, Scoop Jackson, Mike Mansfield, John McCormack, Patsy Mink, Ed Muskie, Bill Proxmire
Preceded by George Murphy	Chair of the National Republican Senatorial Committee; 1969–1971	Succeeded by Peter Dominick
Preceded by Gordon Allott	Chair of the Senate Republican Policy Committee; 1973–1985	Succeeded by Bill Armstrong
U.S. Senate
Preceded by Bill Blakley	U.S. Senator (Class 2) from Texas; 1961–1985; Served alongside: Ralph Yarborough, Lloyd Bentsen	Succeeded by Phil Gramm
Preceded by Wallace F. Bennett	Ranking Member of the Senate Banking Committee; 1971–1977	Succeeded by Edward Brooke
Preceded by Strom Thurmond	Ranking Member of the Senate Armed Services Committee; 1977–1981	Succeeded by John C. Stennis
Preceded by John C. Stennis	Chair of the Senate Armed Services Committee; 1981–1985	Succeeded by Barry Goldwater
Honorary titles
Preceded by Frank Church	Baby of the Senate; 1961–1962	Succeeded by Maurice Murphy
Government offices
Preceded by Anne Armstrong	Chair of the President's Intelligence Advisory Board; 1990–1991	Succeeded by Bobby Inman; Acting
