= Ojibwa Island =

Island in Lake Michigan

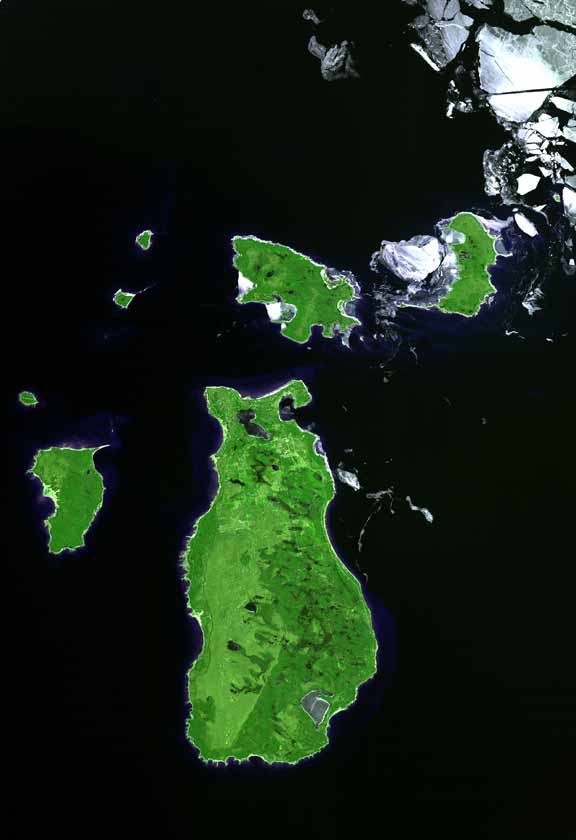
- Ojibwa Island is the small island in the north west corner.

- Location within Michigan Location within the United States

Geography
- Location: Lake Michigan
- Coordinates: 45.8369401°N 85.5867590°W
- Area: 75 acres (30 ha)
- Highest elevation: 594 ft (181.1 m)

Administration
- United States
- State: Michigan
- County: Charlevoix County
- Township: St. James Township

Ojibwa Island (formerly known as Squaw Island) is an island in Lake Michigan and is part of the Beaver Island archipelago. The island is about 75 acres in size, and is privately owned. Ojibwa Island is located a little under two miles north east of Whiskey Island, and a little over three miles west of Garden Island.

The historic Squaw Island Light is located on the north point of the Island.

== Climate ==
Ojibwa Island

Climate chart (precipitation, max. and min. temperature)
| J | F | M | A | M | J | J | A | S | O | N | D |
| 72 −4 −10 | 55 −10 −15 | 48 −3 −8 | 114 2 −3 | 84 7 5 | 79 11 8 | 107 17 14 | 96 16 12 | 103 16 13 | 127 9 6 | 83 6 5 | 66 1 −5 |
- █ Average max. and min. temperatures in °C
- █ Precipitation totals in mm
Imperial conversion
| J | F | M | A | M | J | J | A | S | O | N | D |
| 2.8 25 14 | 2.2 14 5 | 1.9 27 18 | 4.5 36 27 | 3.3 45 41 | 3.1 52 46 | 4.2 63 57 | 3.8 61 54 | 4.1 61 55 | 5 48 43 | 3.3 43 41 | 2.6 34 23 |
- █ Average max. and min. temperatures in °F
- █ Precipitation totals in inches
