= Squaw Island Light =

Lighthouse in Michigan, United States

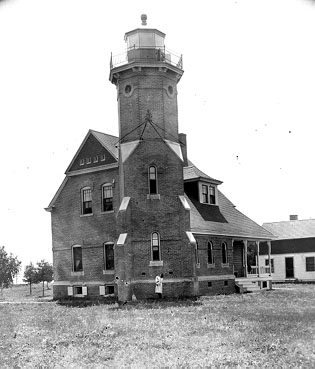
- Location: Ojibwa Island, Charlevoix County, United States
- Coordinates: 45°50′26″N 85°35′13″W

Tower
- Constructed: 1892
- Height: 15 m (49 ft)

Light
- Deactivated: 1928

Squaw Island Light is a privately owned lighthouse located on Ojibwa Island (formerly Squaw Island) in Lake Michigan, about six miles (10 km) north of Beaver Island. The island is part of St. James Township in Charlevoix County of the U.S. state of Michigan. There are 0.30406 square kilometres (75.13 acres) of land on the island. Ojibwa Island and the lighthouse are privately owned and views of the lighthouse from the water are limited due to vegetation.

The U.S. Congress appropriated $25,000 to construct the light on March 3, 1891. Construction began the following spring. Work was completed on September 16, 1892. William H. Shields was appointed as the station's head keeper, and entered the structure for the first time on the evening of October 10, 1892. The original dwelling, which was too small for both the head keeper, the assistant keeper and their families, was expanded in 1894.

Waters approaching the island become very shallow, less than six feet deep even though far out.

Construction of the Lansing Shoals Light Station offshore in 1928 made the Squaw Island light obsolete, and the station was abandoned. The lighthouse deteriorated over many years of neglect until Squaw Island passed into private ownership. Restoration of the station is being done by Bernie Hellstrom of Boyne City, Michigan. There is also a functioning unmanned light on another, much smaller Squaw Island in the St. Mary's River.
