= Squaw weed =

Squaw weed, squaw-weed or squawweed is a common name for several plants in the family Asteraceae native to North America and may refer to:

- Eupatorium rugosum
- Packera aurea
- Senecio ampullaceus
- Senecio flaccidus
- Senecio obovatus
- Senecio vulgaris
- Symphyotrichum puniceum
