= Squaw Humper Dam =

Coordinates: 43.486653°N 102.942132°W

Squaw Humper Dam is a dam on Tahc'a Okute Wakpa (formerly Squaw-Humper Creek) in Oglala Lakota County, South Dakota, in the United States. It is located within Pine Ridge Indian Reservation, the lands of the Oglala Lakota Nation.

The name has generated a degree of controversy for containing the term squaw, which is often held to be pejorative. While the Oglala Lakota successfully changed the name of the stream in federal usage, a proposal to rename the dam to Tahc'a Okute Mni Onaktake did not succeed. At the time, there were concerns expressed that the proposed name would be difficult for the general public to pronounce.
