= Old Squaw Islands =

Island group in Nunavut, Canada

- Location within Nunavut Location within Canada

Geography
- Location: Northern Canada
- Coordinates: 63°30′N 67°56′W
- Archipelago: Arctic Archipelago

Administration
- Canada
- Nunavut: Nunavut
- Region: Qikiqtaaluk

Demographics
- Population: Uninhabited
- Source: Old Squaw Islands at Atlas of Canada

Part of the Baffin Island offshore islands located in Wayne Bay, west of Becher Peninsula, the Old Squaw Islands are part of the Arctic Archipelago and the Qikiqtaaluk Region, in the Canadian territory of Nunavut.
