= Comanche Creek Reservoir =

- Location within Texas Location within the United States
- Location: Somervell and Hood counties, Texas, United States
- Coordinates: 32°17′19″N 97°45′37″W
- Type: Reservoir
- Primary inflows: Comanche Creek
- Primary outflows: Comanche Creek
- Basin countries: United States
- Surface area: 3,275 acres (1,325 ha)
- Average depth: 46 ft (14 m)
- Max. depth: 125 ft (38 m)
- Water volume: 151,418 acre⋅ft (0.186771 km^{3})
- Surface elevation: 775 ft (236 m)

Comanche Creek Reservoir (formerly Squaw Creek Reservoir) is a 3,275-acre (13.3 km^{2}) impoundment located between Glen Rose, Texas and Granbury, Texas. The primary purpose is cooling for Comanche Peak Nuclear Generating Station. During full operation of both units of Comanche Peak, 2.2 million US gallons (8,300 m^{3}) of water are pumped through the plant's main condensers from Comanche Creek Reservoir.

The water is relatively clear and provides good bass fishing. The shoreline is rocky. Situated about 45 miles southwest of the Dallas-Fort Worth metroplex in Hood and Somerville county this reservoir was built in 1979 by the Texas Utilities Generating Company (now Luminant Power), and has an average depth of 46 ft. This reservoir is used to cool down the nuclear power plant in Somerville county. There are several fish species such as Largemouth and Smallmouth bass, Channel catfish and Sunfish. Luminant Power also has a park that can be used for recreational purposes. The park was closed and scheduled to be reopened sometime in January 2022.

== History ==
The reservoir was built by TXU for cooling for Comanche Peak in the 1970s. It was impounded in 1979 and took 2 years to fill. The reservoir was man made when it was impounded in 1979 and the primary use was cooling of the nuclear power plant. Secondary uses for the impoundment is for recreational fishing. During COVID-19 Luminant Power shut down the public access to the park on Comanche Creek. The reservoir was first opened to the public in 2005 and has a conservational pool elevation of 775 feet.

Due to the offensive nature of the word "squaw" the name of the reservoir was changed to Comanche Creek Reservoir by the United States Board of Geographic Names on September 8, 2022.

== Fish populations ==
In various years the lake has been stocked with channel catfish, largemouth bass, smallmouth bass, shad and talapia. There are several species of fish that live in this reservoir. These species include Largemouth and smallmouth Bass, Channel Catfish, Tilapia, and Sunfish. These species of fish are well managed as there are events to catch certain species of fish to manage populations.

== Recreational use ==
Fishing is the primary recreational activity. There are camping and fishing facilities at the 475 acre (1.9 km^{2}) Squaw Creek Park across from the nuclear plant. While fishing is the main recreation use there is also swimming as the water in the reservoir is warmer than normal Texas water as the water that cools the power plant heats up and gets dumped back into the reservoir.

== Location and access ==
Comanche Creek Reservoir is located at 32°17′19″N 97°45′37″W (32.2884749, -97.7603064) near Glen Rose. It is accessed off State Highway 144.

The reservoir is managed by TXU and has been closed to the public since the attacks on September 11, 2001. Access to the reservoir was previously allowed via Squaw Creek Park. The Squaw Creek Park is now managed by Luminant Power. They allow bank fishing from Thursday-Sunday, and boat fishing from Friday-Sunday by reservation only. The park's hours are currently 7 a.m. to 4 p.m.

A smaller reservoir, Wheeler Branch Reservoir is situated to the south.

== Controversy over public access ==
There have been several attempts in recent years to get the lake re-opened to the public by anglers as well as recreational boaters. On February 26, 2007, TXU agreed to an estimated $45 billion buyout by a group of private equity firms led by KKR and Texas Pacific Group. This buyout has made it opened to the public.
