= 1961 United States Senate special election in Texas =

- April 4, 1961 (first round); May 27, 1961 (runoff)
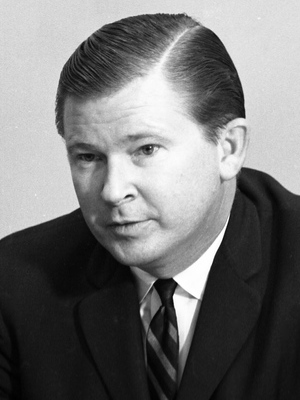

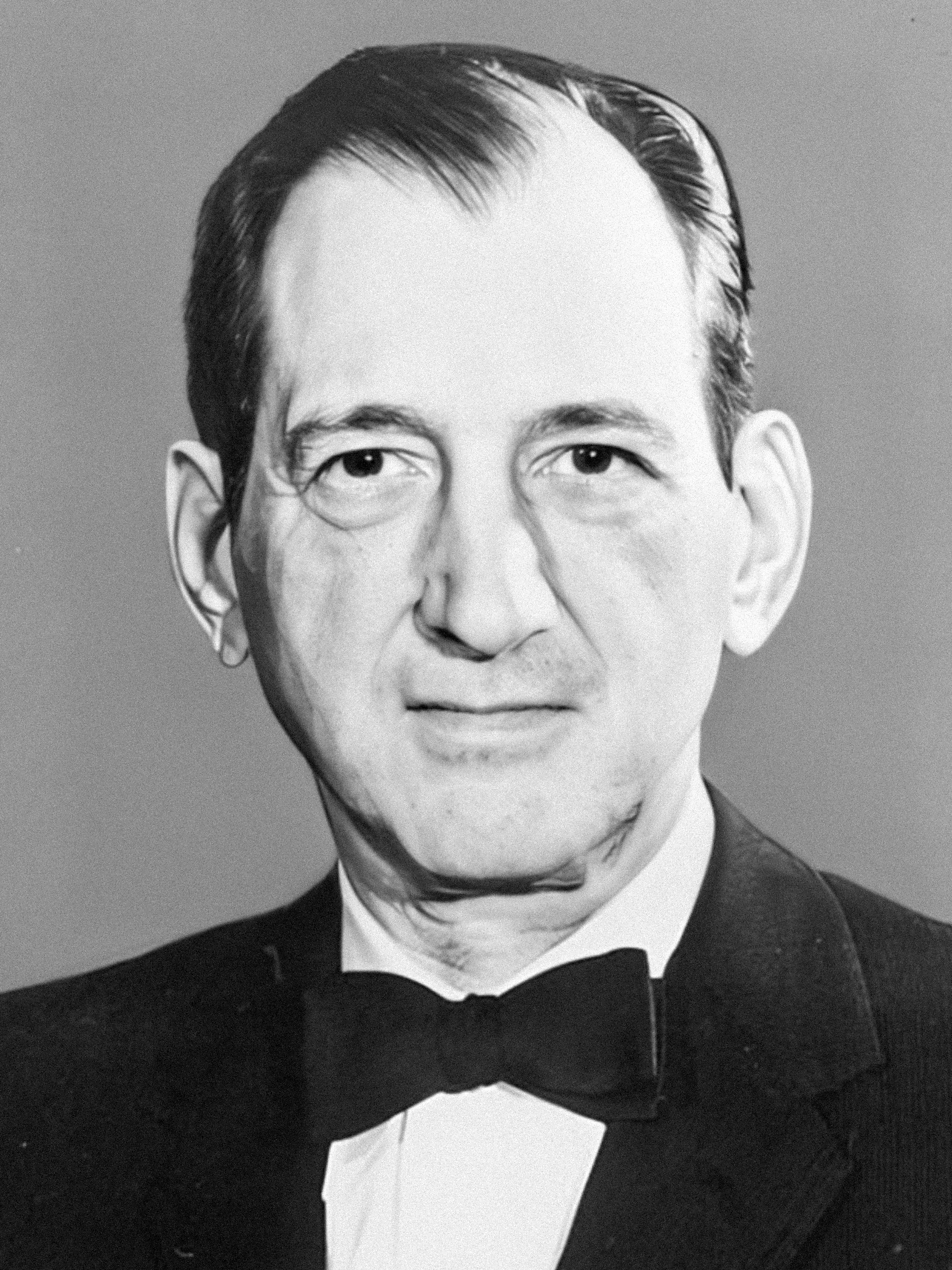

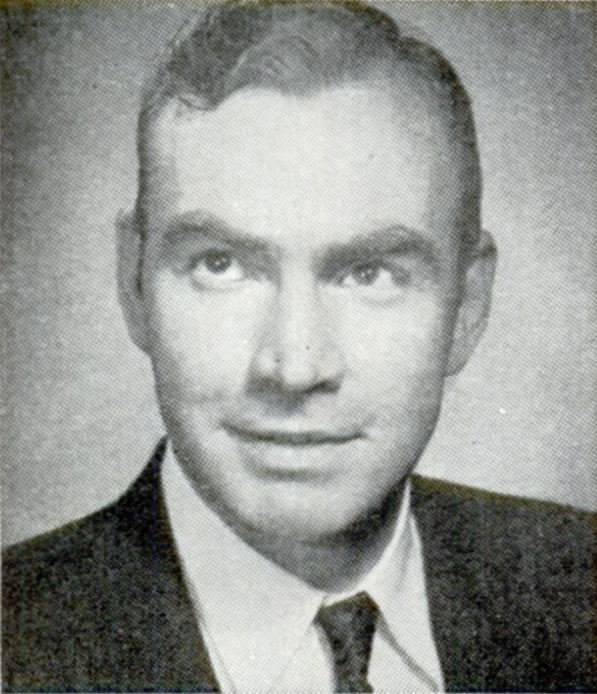

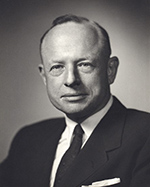

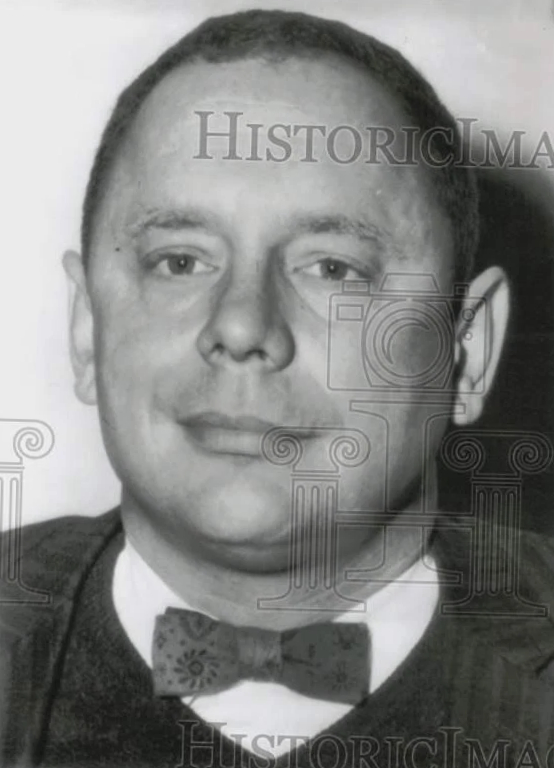

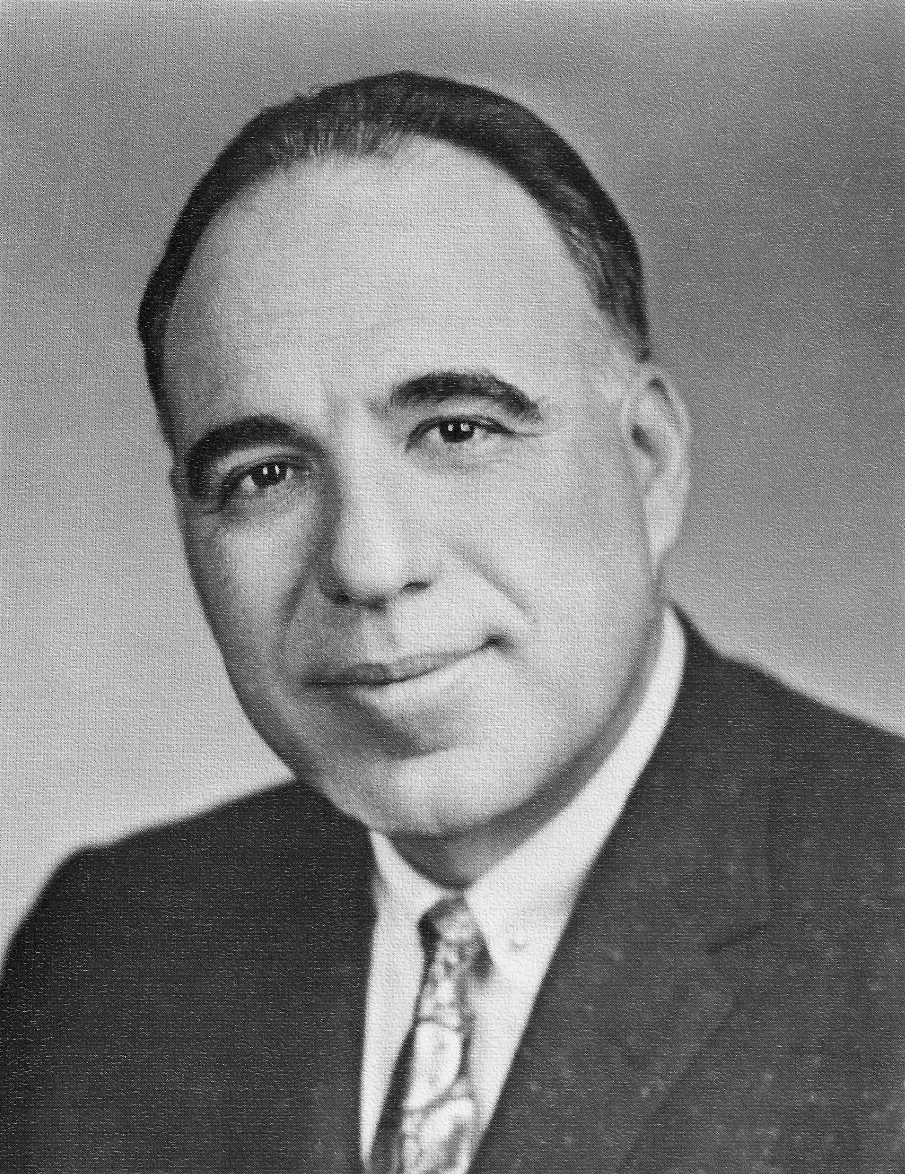
Candidate	John Tower	William A. Blakley	Jim Wright
Party	Republican	Democratic	Democratic
First round	327,308; 30.93%	190,818; 18.03%	171,328; 16.19%
Runoff	448,217; 50.58%	437,874; 49.42%	Eliminated
Candidate	Will Wilson	Maury Maverick Jr.	Henry B. González
Party	Democratic	Democratic	Democratic
First round	121,961; 11.53%	104,992; 9.92%	97,659; 9.23%
Runoff	Eliminated	Eliminated	Eliminated
- Tower: 20–30% 30–40% 40–50% 50–60% 60–70% 70–80% Blakley: 20–30% 30–40% 40–50% 50–60% 60–70% Wright: 20–30% 30–40% 40–50% 50–60% 60–70% 70–80% Wilson: 20–30% 30–40% 40–50% 60–70% 70–80% 80–90% Maverick: 20–30% 30–40% Gonzalez: 20–30% 30–40% 40–50% 50–60% 80–90% >90% Tower: 50–60% 60–70% 70–80% 80–90% Blakley: 50–60% 60–70% 70–80% 80–90% >90% Tie: 50% Tower: 50–60% 60–70% 70–80% 80–90% Blakley: 50–60% 60–70% 70–80% 80–90% >90% Tie: 50%
U.S. senator before election
William A. Blakley
Democratic
Elected U.S. Senator
John Tower
Republican

The 1961 United States Senate special election in Texas was held on May 27, 1961. The election was held to replace outgoing Senator Lyndon B. Johnson, who had been elected Vice President of the United States.

Republican John Tower, who had been the nominee for the regularly scheduled election in 1960, defeated appointed Democratic senator William Blakley in a runoff after neither received a majority of the vote in a crowded first round, which included over 70 candidates. He became the first Republican to represent Texas in the Senate since Reconstruction in 1877. Tower was also the first Republican to be popularly elected to the Senate in any former Confederate state.

Because Texas had been a Solid South state, the loss of Johnson's Senate seat would be seen as a stinging defeat for the Kennedy administration and the Democratic Party, given that the Civil Rights Movement was getting off the ground and the increasing sympathy for it amongst increasingly influential liberal Democrats. The seat stayed in Republican hands for the next 65 years, until James Talarico defeated Ken Paxton in the 2026 election.

One of the Democrats who were defeated in the first round was congressman Jim Wright, who went on to briefly serve as Speaker of the United States House of Representatives in the late 1980s.

== Primary election ==
=== Candidates ===
Seventy-one candidates were on the ballot for the primary election. At the time, the filing fee for ballot access was only $50 ($528 in 2024 when adjusted for inflation).

The primary was held on April 4.

==== Major candidates ====
- William A. Blakley (Democrat), incumbent appointee senator
- Henry B. Gonzalez (Democrat), state senator from San Antonio
- Maury Maverick Jr. (Democrat), attorney and former state representative
- John Tower (Republican), political science professor at Midwestern State University and nominee for U.S. Senate in 1960
- Will Wilson (Democrat), Attorney General of Texas
- Jim Wright (Democrat), U.S. Representative from Fort Worth

==== Minor candidates ====
None of these candidates received more than 0.5% of the popular vote.

- G. H. Allen
- Jim W. Amos
- Dale Baker
- Mali Barraco
- Tom E. Barton
- R. G. Becker
- Jacob Bergolofsky
- Ted Bisland
- G. E. Blewett
- Joyce Bradshaw
- Chester D. Brooks
- William L. Burlison
- Ronald J. Byers
- Joseph M. Carter
- George A. Davisson
- Winnie K. Derrick
- Harry R. Diehl
- Harvill O. Eaton
- Jonnie Mae Eckman
- Paul F. Eix
- Ben H. Faber
- H. E. Fanning
- Charles O. Foerster Jr.
- Harold Franklin
- George N. Gallagher Jr.
- Richard J. Gay
- Van T. George Jr.
- Arthur Glover
- Delbert E. Granstaff
- Curtis E. Hill
- Willard Park Holland
- John N. Hopkins
- Mary Hazel Houston
- Ben M. Johnson
- Guy Johnson
- Morgan H. Johnson
- C. B. Kennedy
- H. Springer Knoblauch
- Lloyd Layne
- Hugh O. Lea
- V. C. Logan
- Frank A. Matera
- Brown McCallum
- James E. McKeen
- Steve Nemecek
- George E. Noyes
- Cecil D. Perkins
- William H. Posey
- George Red
- Wesley Roberts
- D. T. Sampson
- Eristus Sams
- A. Dale Savage
- Carl Schrade
- Albert Roy Smith
- Homer H. Stalarow
- Frank Stanford
- John B. Sypert
- Martha Tredway
- S. S. Vela
- Bill Whitten
- Hugh Wilson
- Hoyt G. Wilson
- Marcos Zertuche

1961 U.S. Senate special election primary
Party	Candidate	Votes	%
Republican	John Tower	327,308	30.93%
Democratic	William Blakley (incumbent)	190,818	18.03%
Democratic	Jim Wright	171,328	16.19%
Democratic	Will Wilson	121,961	11.53%
Democratic	Maury Maverick Jr.	104,992	9.92%
Democratic	Henry B. Gonzalez	97,659	9.23%
Various	Minor candidates	44,058	4.16%
Total votes		1,058,124	100.00%

== Runoff election ==
=== Results ===
1961 U.S. Senate special election
Party	Candidate	Votes	%	±%
Republican	John Tower	448,217	50.58%	▲9.46
Democratic	William A. Blakley (incumbent)	437,874	49.42%	▼8.56
Total votes		886,091	100.00%	
