= Granite Mountain Reservoir =

- Location within Nevada Location within the United States
- Location: Washoe County, Nevada
- Coordinates: 40°49′30″N 119°32′12″W
- Type: Reservoir
- Basin countries: United States
- Max. depth: 45 ft (14 m)
- Surface elevation: 4,439 ft (1,353 m)

The Granite Mountain Reservoir (formerly Squaw Valley Reservoir) is a lake managed by the Bureau of Land Management in Washoe County, Nevada. The reservoir is a fishing destination stocked with several species of fish, including trout, bass and catfish.

== Description ==
The Granite Mountain Reservoir is primarily fed by a large spring located less than a mile north. The lake's approximate surface area is 47.5 acres (19 ha) and its max depth is 45 feet (14 m). The lake has been stocked with fish by the Nevada Department of Wildlife.

== Name Change ==
Due to the offensive nature of the word "squaw," the name of Granite Mountain Reservoir was changed on September 8, 2022 by the United States Board on Geographic Names.

== Ownership ==
The reservoir and the valley below is private land, though public access is allowed to the east side of the reservoir only. The dam serves as a bridge to travel between the two, however public travel across is not allowed.
