= Glen Rose High School (Texas) =

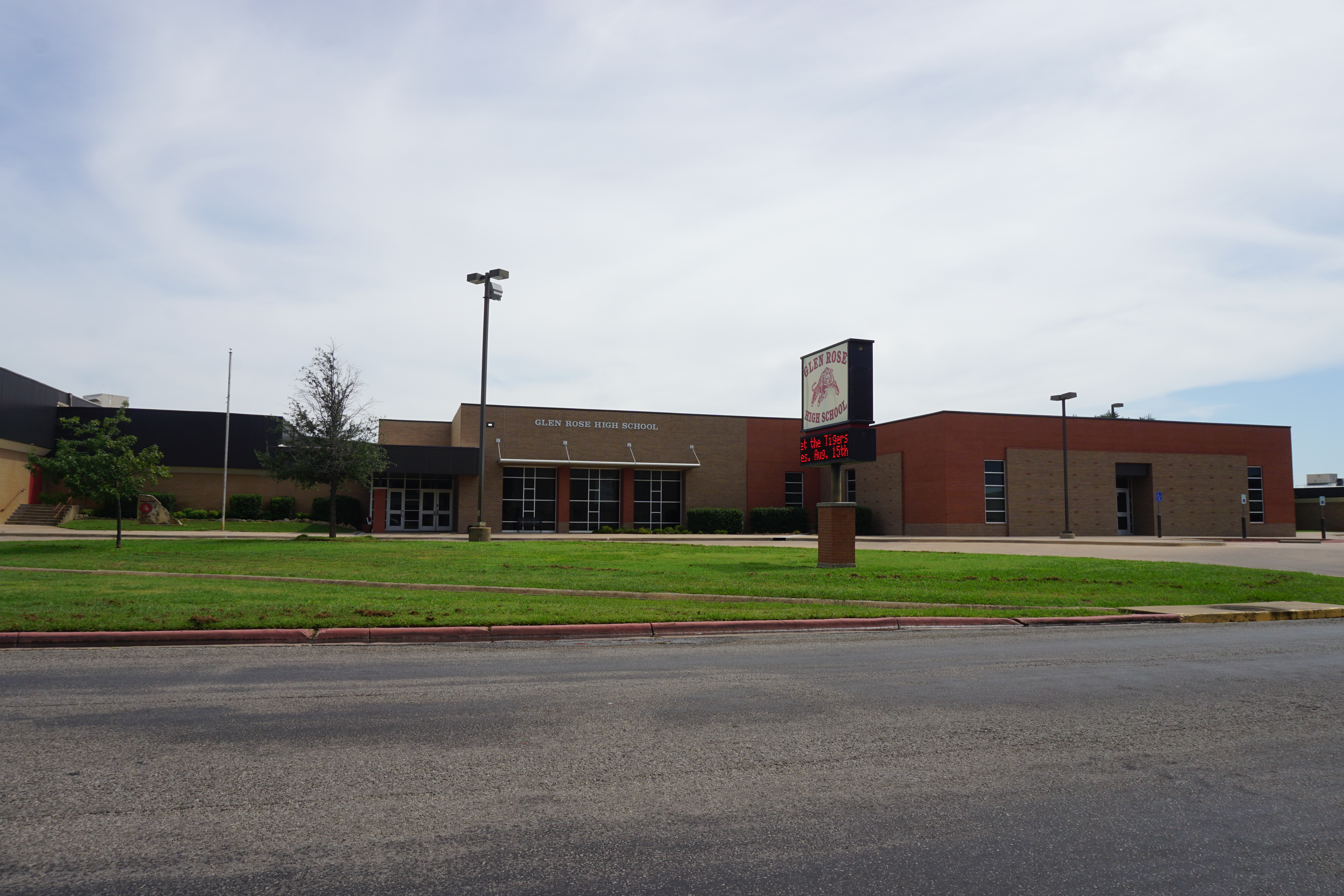
- Glen Rose High School entrance

Location
- 900 Stadium Drive; Glen Rose, Texas 76043; United States; 32.231513°N 97.765918°W

Information
- School type: Public high school
- School district: Glen Rose Independent School District
- Principal: Kelly Shackelford
- Teaching staff: 46.64 (FTE)
- Grades: 9–12
- Enrollment: 617 (2023–2024)
- Student to teacher ratio: 13.23
- Colors: Red and White
- Athletics conference: UIL Class 4A
- Nickname: Tigers
- Website: www.grisd.net/o/grhs

Glen Rose High School is a public high school serving students grades 9–12 located in the city of Glen Rose, Somervell County, Texas, and is zoned to the city of Glen Rose and the unincorporated communities of Glass, Rainbow and Nemo It is the only high school in the serving Glen Rose ISD and is in UIL region 4A, In 2022, the school received an "A" rating from the Texas Education Agency.

== Athletics ==
In 2018 the Glen Rose Tigers Volleyball team reached the State 4A Volleyball Semifinals.

In 2023, the Glen Rose Tigers Girls Basketball team reached the State 4A Basketball Semifinals.

As of 2023, the Glen Rose Tigers participate in the following sports:

- Baseball
- Basketball
- Cross country
- Football
- Powerlifting
- Softball
- Soccer
- Swimming
- Tennis
- Track and field
- Volleyball

== Notable alumni ==
- Dan Campbell, American football coach
- Brooke Rollins, United States Secretary of Agriculture
