= Barnard's Mill =

- U.S. National Register of Historic Places
- Texas State Antiquities Landmark
- Recorded Texas Historic Landmark
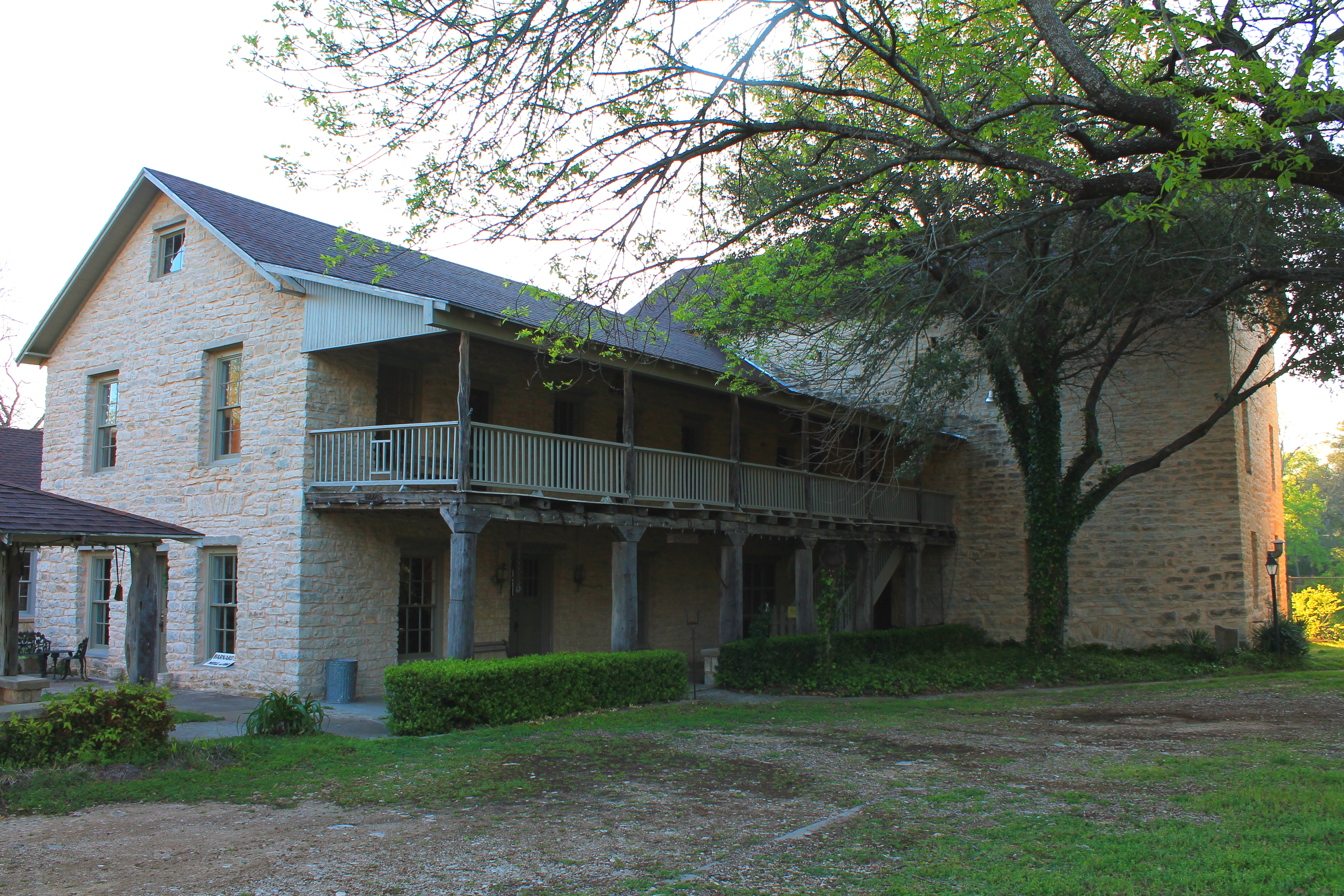
- Barnard's Mill in 2012

- Location within Texas Location within the United States
- Location: 307 SW Barnard Street, Glen Rose, Texas
- Coordinates: 32°13′54″N 97°45′23″W
- Area: 2.5 acres (1.0 ha)
- Built: 1860
- Built by: Charles E. Barnard
- NRHP reference No.: 82004523
- TSAL No.: 3174
- RTHL No.: 304

Significant dates
- Added to NRHP: September 9, 1982
- Designated TSAL: April 22, 2010
- Designated RTHL: 1962

Barnard's Mill is located in Glen Rose, Texas. It was added to the National Register of Historic Places on September 9, 1982.

The building is owned by the Somervell History Foundation, and operated as Barnard's Mill Art Museum. The museum's collection include works from Jewell Miears Fielder, Amy Miears Jackson, Robert Summers, Jack Bryant, R. Kleinfelder, Morris Henry Hobbs, Asian and Native American art and artifacts.

== History ==
The mill was originally a water-powered gristmill and then a steam powered burr mill. It was sold by Charles E. Barnard to Major T.C. Jordan in 1874. Jordan sold the mill to Dr. J. J. Hannah in 1943 where it became a health spa with mineral water. Dr. Hannah added a wing to the building. In 1949 it became a hospital and clinic with the arrival of Dr. Roger Marks. The building was sold to Dr. Marks and Dr. Robert English in 1955, and it became the Marks-English Hospital and Clinic. The building was sold to Richard H. Moore in 1979. Mr. Moore gifted the mill to the Somervell History Foundation in 2005.

== See also ==
- National Register of Historic Places listings in Somervell County, Texas
- Recorded Texas Historic Landmarks in Somervell County
