= List of Farm to Market Roads in Texas (200–299) =

- Texas Farm to Market Road and Ranch to Market Road markers

Highway names
- Interstates: Interstate Highway X (IH-X, I-X)
- US Highways: U.S. Highway X (US X)
- State: State Highway X (SH X)
- Loops: Loop X
- Spurs: Spur X
- Recreational: Recreational Road X (RE X)
- Farm or Ranch to Market Roads: Farm to Market Road X (FM X); Ranch to Market Road X (RM X)
- Park Roads: Park Road X (PR X)

System links
- Highways in Texas; Interstate; US; State; Former; Toll; Loops; Spurs; FM/RM; Park; Rec

Farm to Market Roads in Texas are owned and maintained by the Texas Department of Transportation (TxDOT).

== FM 200 ==
Farm to Market Road 200
- Location: Somervell and Johnson counties
- Length: 13.971 mi (22.484 km)
- Existed: June 12, 1945–present

Farm to Market Road 200 (FM 200) is located in Somervell and Johnson counties. Its eastern terminus is at FM 1434 southeast of Nemo, and its western terminus is at SH 144 near Rainbow.

FM 200 was designated on June 12, 1945, from SH 144 to Rainbow. On November 28, 1945, the description was changed so that FM 200 was extended to US 67. On September 28, 1949, FM 200 was extended east to FM 199 at Nemo. On June 28, 1963, FM 200 was extended southeast 4.1 miles (6.6 km). On September 5, 1973, FM 200 was extended to FM 1434.

== FM 201 ==
Farm to Market Road 201
- Location: Sabine County
- Length: 7.422 mi (11.945 km)
- Existed: May 25, 1995–present

Farm to Market Road 201 (FM 201) is located in Sabine County, mainly within the Sabine National Forest. It runs east from an intersection with US 96. State maintenance ends just past its intersection with FM 2343; an unimproved roadway continues under U.S. Forest Service jurisdiction.

FM 201 was designated on May 25, 1995, from US 96, 2.6 miles (4.2 km) southeast of Spur 414, east 4.3 miles (6.9 km). On March 30, 2000, the road was extended 4.1 miles (6.6 km) eastward.

=== FM 201 (1945) ===
Farm to Market Road 201
- Location: Somervell and Hood counties
- Length: 23.2 mi (37.3 km)
- Existed: June 12, 1945–December 20, 1984

A previous route numbered FM 201 was designated in Somervell County on June 12, 1945, from Glen Rose via Post Oak School to the Hood County line. On September 6, 1949, the section from old US 67 to SH 144 was added. On May 23, 1951, the road was extended southwest and northwest to another point on the Hood County line. On July 5, 1951, the road was extended to US 377 in Tolar, replacing FM 915. On December 17, 1952, the designation was extended northwest another 6.0 miles (9.7 km). FM 201 was cancelled on December 20, 1984, and its mileage was transferred to FM 56.

== FM 202 ==
Farm to Market Road 202
- Location: Somervell County
- Length: 2.533 mi (4.076 km)
- Existed: June 12, 1945–present

Farm to Market Road 202 (FM 202) is located in Somervell County. It runs from SH 144 north to FM 56.

FM 202 was designated on June 12, 1945, from Glen Rose via Rock Creek School to SH 144. On December 23, 1959, the section from FM 1992 to Glen Rose (along with the entirety of FM 1992) was transferred to FM 56.

== FM 203 ==
Farm to Market Road 203
- Location: Somervell and Bosque counties
- Length: 11.338 mi (18.247 km)
- Existed: June 12, 1945–present

Farm to Market Road 203 (FM 203) is located in Somervell and Bosque counties. It runs from US 67 in Glass to SH 144 north of Walnut Springs. FM 203 was designated on June 12, 1945, from US 67 in Glass southward 2.3 miles (3.7 km). On October 31, 1958, FM 203 was extended to SH 144, replacing FM 2318.

== FM 204 ==
Farm to Market Road 204
- Location: Taylor County
- Length: 3.05 mi (4.91 km)
- Existed: February 27, 1997–present

Farm to Market Road 204 (FM 204) is located in Taylor County. It runs from US 83/US 84 east and north to FM 1750.

FM 204 was designated on February 27, 1997, along the current route.

=== FM 204 (1945) ===
Farm to Market Road 204
- Location: Hood and Somervell counties
- Existed: June 12, 1945–December 20, 1984

A previous route numbered FM 204 was designated on June 12, 1945, from US 67 3.2 miles (5.1 km) via Cottonwood School to Rough Creek School. On July 14, 1949, the road was extended 2.0 miles (3.2 km) northeast of Rough Creek School to a road intersection. On October 25, 1954, the road was extended northeast to FM 201 (now FM 56), replacing FM 2223 (the connecting section was designated on October 13). FM 204 was cancelled by district request on December 20, 1984, and transferred to FM 51.

== FM 205 ==
Farm to Market Road 205
- Location: Erath, Hood, and Somervell counties
- Length: 28.427 mi (45.749 km)
- Existed: June 12, 1945–present

Farm to Market Road 205 (FM 205) is located in Erath, Hood, and Somervell counties. It runs from US 281 in Stephenville east to SH 144 in Glen Rose. FM 205 was designated from US 67 in Glen Rose westward 4.0 miles (6.4 km) to Lanham Mill. On October 31, 1958, FM 205 was extended east to FM 201 (now FM 56). On May 5, 1966, FM 205 was extended westward 3.6 miles (5.8 km). On May 5, 1974, FM 205 was extended west to FM 204 (now FM 51). On December 20, 1984, FM 205 was extended to US 281, replacing FM 2157.

== FM 206 ==
Farm to Market Road 206
- Location: Tyler
- Length: 0.899 mi (1,447 m)
- Existed: April 26, 1989–present

Farm to Market Road 206 (FM 206) is a 0.899-mile (1.447 km) state road in western Tyler, that connects Spur 364 with SH 3.

FM 206 was designated on April 26, 1989, from SH 31 west of Tyler southwest to a railroad crossing. On December 13, 1990, the road was extended to Spur 364. On June 27, 1995, the entire route was redesignated Urban Road 206 (UR 206). The designation reverted to FM 206 with the elimination of the Urban Road system on November 15, 2018. The city limits of Tyler were eventually expanded to include the entire route.

=== FM 206 (1945) ===
Farm to Market Road 206
- Location: Palo Pinto and Jack counties
- Existed: June 11, 1945–December 20, 1984

A previous route numbered FM 206 was designated on June 11, 1945, from Graford in Palo Pinto County north to the Jack County line. On July 10, 1945, the road was extended north to SH 24 (now US 380). FM 206 was cancelled on December 20, 1984, and transferred to FM 4.

== FM 207 ==
Farm to Market Road 207
- Location: Stephens and Palo Pinto counties
- Length: 29.087 mi (46.811 km)
- Existed: June 11, 1945–present

Farm to Market Road 207 (FM 207) is located in Stephens and Palo Pinto counties. It runs from US 180 near Breckenridge to SH 16 near Strawn.

FM 207 was designated on June 11, 1945, from Strawn northwest to the Stephens–Palo Pinto county line. On December 10, 1946, it was shortened to end 1.0 mile (1.6 km) southeast of that county line. On October 13, 1954, FM 207 was extended to the Stephens–Palo Pinto county line. On November 3, 1954, the road was extended to FM 717, replacing FM 2232. On March 27, 1957, FM 207 was extended northwest to US 180, replacing FM 577.

== FM 208 ==
Farm to Market Road 208
- Location: Hood and Johnson counties
- Existed: June 6, 1945–February 25, 1985

Farm to Market Road 208 (FM 208) was located in Hood and Johnson counties. No highway currently uses the FM 208 designation.

FM 208 was designated on June 6, 1945, from a point on US 377 east of Granbury to Acton to another point on US 377 east of Granbury, forming a partial loop. On December 20, 1984, the section from US 377 south to the junction in Acton was transferred to FM 167. FM 208 was then rerouted to Cleburne, replacing FM 1192. FM 208 was cancelled on February 25, 1985, by district request and transferred to FM 4.

== FM 209 ==
Farm to Market Road 209
- Location: Throckmorton and Young counties
- Length: 37.448 mi (60.267 km)
- Existed: June 18, 1945–present

Farm to Market Road 209 (FM 209) is located in Throckmorton and Young counties. It runs from US 283 near Woodson to SH 67 near Graham. FM 209 was designated on June 16, 1945, from SH 67 near Graham westward 6.0 miles (9.7 km). On November 23, 1948, it was extended west to 9.9 miles (15.9 km) west of Graham. On July 14, 1949, FM 209 was extended west to Murray. On November 20, 1951, FM 209 was extended west to the Throckmorton County line. On January 3, 1952, the road was extended west to SH 6 (now US 183), replacing FM 1204. On February 6, 1953, FM 209 was extended west to its current terminus, replacing FM 375.

== FM 210 ==
Farm to Market Road 210
- Location: Archer and Young counties
- Length: 37.874 mi (60.952 km)
- Existed: June 18, 1945–present

Farm to Market Road 210 (FM 210) is located in Archer and Young counties. It runs from SH 25 west of Archer City to SH 79 in Olney.

FM 210 was designated on June 18, 1945, from Spur 132 in Olney westward 10.6 miles (17.1 km). On December 17, 1952, it was extended east 0.7 miles (1.1 km) to SH 79. On October 29, 1953, it was extended northeastward to the Archer County line. On December 10, 1953, the road was extended northeastward and eastward to SH 25, replacing FM 374.

== FM 211 ==
Farm to Market Road 211
- Location: Terry, Lynn, and Garza counties
- Length: 60.643 mi (97.595 km)
- Existed: June 11, 1945–present

Farm to Market Road 211 (FM 211) is located in Terry, Lynn, and Garza counties. It runs from FM 303 in Terry County to SH 207 north of Post.

FM 211 was designated on June 11, 1945, from Wilson across US 87 to New Home. On June 25, 1945, a section from US 62 1 mile (1.6 km) south of Meadow to the Lynn–Terry county line was added. On January 27, 1948, the sections were connected. On July 20, 1948, FM 211 was extended west to SH 51 (now US 385). On March 19, 1949, a section from the Garza–Lynn county line to US 84 was added, replacing FM 1068. On July 25, 1951, the sections were connected. On February 24, 1953, it was extended west to its current terminus, replacing part of FM 300. On October 31, 1958, FM 211 was extended east to FM 122 (now SH 207).

== FM 212 ==
Farm to Market Road 212
- Location: Lynn County
- Length: 17.692 mi (28.473 km)
- Existed: June 11, 1945–present

Farm to Market Road 212 (FM 212) is located in Lynn County. It runs from US 84 to FM 1313 in Grassland.

FM 212 was designated on June 11, 1945, from US 380 south 2 miles (3.2 km) to Grassland (current junction with FM 1313). On January 18, 1952, FM 212 was extended west to FM 1054. However, this extension was transferred to FM 1313 on February 25 of that same year. On November 24, 1959, FM 212 was extended north to FM 211. On February 3, 1960, FM 212 was extended north to US 84, replacing FM 1703.

== FM 213 ==
Farm to Market Road 213
- Location: Yoakum, Terry, and Lynn counties
- Length: 68.533 mi (110.293 km)
- Existed: June 11, 1945–present

Farm to Market Road 213 (FM 213) is located in Yoakum, Terry, and Lynn counties. It runs from SH 214 north of Denver City to FM 1054 in Draw.

FM 213 was designated on June 11, 1945, from US 87 east to Draw (then named Drew). Later that day, FM 213 was extended west to Wells. On January 27, 1948, FM 213 was extended west to New Moore. On July 14, 1949, FM 213 was extended west to SH 137 in Union. On November 20, 1951, FM 213 was extended west to FM 403. On May 23, 1958, FM 213 was extended west to FM 1312. On February 10, 1966, FM 213 was extended west to SH 214, replacing FM 396. That same day, FM 303 was extended south replacing FM 1312, and a concurrency with FM 303 was created.

== FM 214 ==
Farm to Market Road 214
- Location: Swisher County
- Length: 6.101 mi (9.819 km)
- Existed: June 11, 1945–present

Farm to Market Road 214 (FM 214) is located in Swisher County. It runs from US 87 in Kaffir Switch west to FM 1424 at a point north of Tulia.

FM 214 was designated on June 11, 1945, along the current route.

== FM 215 ==
Farm to Market Road 215
- Location: Coryell and Bosque counties
- Length: 13.978 mi (22.495 km)
- Existed: August 1, 1963–present

Farm to Market Road 215 (FM 215) is located in Coryell and Bosque counties. It runs from SH 36 north of Gatesville to FM 217 in Mosheim.

FM 215 was designated on August 1, 1963, from SH 36 northward 0.2 miles (0.32 km) to the Gatesvile State School for Boys. On June 2, 1967, FM 215 was extended northward to White Hall. On September 5, 1973, FM 215 was extended to FM 217.

=== FM 215 (1945) ===
Farm to Market Road 215
- Location: Hamilton and Bosque counties
- Existed: June 11, 1945–December 10, 1959

A previous route numbered FM 215 was designated on June 11, 1945, from Clifton to Womack. On October 25, 1947, sections from the Hamilton County line to SH 22 and from SH 22 to Clifton were added, creating a concurrency with SH 22. On June 1, 1948, the road was extended to SH 22. On October 26, 1954, the road was extended 7.7 miles (12.4 km) northwest to a county road 3.0 miles (4.8 km) east of Fairy, and west to FM 1602 on July 28, 1955. FM 215 was cancelled on December 10, 1959, and transferred to FM 219, although the road was still signed as FM 215 until 1960.

== FM 216 ==
Farm to Market Road 216
- Location: Bosque County
- Length: 7.317 mi (11.776 km)
- Existed: June 11, 1945–present

Farm to Market Road 216 (FM 216) is located in Bosque County. It runs from FM 927 in Iredell to the Bosque–Erath county line.

FM 216 was designated on June 11, 1945, from Iredell to Flag Creek, 0.5 miles (0.80 km) south of the Bosque–Erath county line. However, FM 216 was programmed and constructed to the Bosque–Erath county line, so the description changed to match this. On October 19, 1955, 0.1 miles (0.16 km) were eliminated because of the relocation of FM 927.

== FM 217 ==
Farm to Market Road 217
- Location: Coryell and Bosque counties
- Length: 25.835 mi (41.577 km)
- Existed: June 11, 1945–present

Farm to Market Road 217 (FM 217) is located in Coryell and Bosque counties. It runs from SH 36 in Jonesboro to SH 6 near Valley Mills.

FM 217 was designated on November 20, 1951, from SH 6 in Valley Mills to Mosheim. On November 20, 1951, FM 217 was extended to the Coryell–Bosque county line. On July 28, 1955, FM 217 was extended to FM 182. On March 21, 1958, FM 217 was extended to SH 36, replacing FM 2280.

== FM 218 ==
Farm to Market Road 218
- Location: Brown, Mills, and Hamilton counties
- Length: 41.178 mi (66.270 km)
- Existed: June 16, 1945–present

Farm to Market Road 218 (FM 218) is located in Brown, Mills, and Hamilton counties. It runs from US 84 in Zephyr to SH 36 in Hamilton.

FM 218 was designated on June 16, 1945, from SH 36 in Hamilton via Pottsville to the Hamilton–Mills county line. On July 14, 1949, FM 218 was extended to SH 16 in Priddy. On November 12, 1953, FM 218 was extended to US 84 in Zephyr, replacing FM 1642.

== FM 219 ==
Farm to Market Road 219
- Location: Erath, Hamilton, and Bosque counties
- Length: 91.923 mi (147.936 km)
- Existed: June 16, 1945–present

Farm to Market Road 219 (FM 219) is located in Erath, Hamilton, and Bosque counties. It runs 91.9 miles (147.9 km) from SH 108 in Huckabay to SH 22 (west of Laguna Park).

FM 219 was designated on June 16, 1945, from US 281 in Olin via Carlton to the Hamilton–Erath county line. On July 9, 1945, FM 219 was extended to Dublin. On February 6, 1953, it was extended to FM 8, replacing FM 912. On October 25, 1954, it was extended north to SH 108 at Huckabay, replacing FM 1716. On November 24, 1959, FM 219 was extended southeast to FM 1602. On December 10, 1959, the highway was extended southeast to SH 22, replacing FM 215 and creating a concurrency with FM 1602.

== FM 220 ==
Farm to Market Road 220
- Location: Cherokee County
- Length: 4.074 mi (6.556 km)
- Existed: July 23, 2026–present

Farm to Market Road 220 (FM 220) is located in Cherokee County. It runs from SH 21, 3 miles (4.8 km) south of Alto, south approximately 4 miles (6.4 km) to a county road.

FM 220 was designated on May 23, 1951, along the current route.

=== FM 220 (1945) ===
Farm to Market Road 220
- Location: Hamilton County
- Existed: June 18, 2020–October 30, 2025

FM 220 was previously designated in Hamilton County on June 18, 1945, from Lanham to Fairy. On November 23, 1948, it was extended north to US 281 at Hico. On July 14, 1949, the designation was extended south 4.7 miles (7.6 km) to a road intersection. On October 30, 1950, FM 220 was renumbered FM 1602 to avoid conflict with nearby SH 220.

== FM 221 ==
Farm to Market Road 221
- Location: Hamilton County
- Length: 13.496 mi (21.720 km)
- Existed: June 18, 1945–present

Farm to Market Road 221 (FM 221) is located in Hamilton County. It runs from US 281 northwest via Shive to FM 218.

FM 221 was designated on June 18, 1945, from US 281, 7 miles (11 km) south of Hamilton west to Shive. On November 20, 1951, the road was extended 2.9 miles (4.7 km). On January 15, 1952, the road was extended to FM 218, replacing FM 1743. A spur connection at Shive was also added. This spur connection was removed from the state highway system on April 25, 1997, and returned to Hamilton County (along with the FM 1241 spur connection) in exchange for the creation of FM 3302.

== FM 222 ==
Farm to Market Road 222
- Location: San Jacinto County
- Length: 12.083 mi (19.446 km)
- Existed: June 11, 1945–present

Farm to Market Road 222 (FM 222) is located in San Jacinto County. It runs from SH 150 near Coldspring northeast to Camilla and southeast to SH 150 in Shepherd.

FM 222 was designated on June 11, 1945, from SH 150, 1.5 miles (2.4 km) southeast of Coldspring to Camilla. On May 6, 1964, the road was extended south 1.9 miles (3.1 km). On December 12, 1969, the road was extended southeast 6.7 miles (10.8 km) to SH 150 at Shepherd, replacing FM 2972 (the connecting section was designated on November 26).

== FM 223 ==
Farm to Market Road 223
- Location: San Jacinto and Liberty counties
- Length: 9.308 mi (14.980 km)
- Existed: June 11, 1945–present

Farm to Market Road 223 (FM 223) is located in San Jacinto and Liberty counties. It runs from Loop 424 in Shepherd to FM 787 near Cleveland.

FM 223 was designated on June 11, 1945, from US 59 (now Loop 424) southeast 4.1 miles (6.6 km) to Cross Roads. On October 31, 1957, the road was extended southeast 2.3 miles (3.7 km) to the San Jacinto–Liberty county line. On November 24, 1959, the road was extended to 3.6 miles (5.8 km) to SH 105T (now FM 787).

== FM 224 ==
Farm to Market Road 224
- Location: San Jacinto County
- Length: 7.743 mi (12.461 km)
- Existed: June 11, 1945–present

Farm to Market Road 224 (FM 224) is located in San Jacinto County. It runs from SH 156 in unincorporated Stephen Creek to SH 156 near Coldspring.

FM 224 was designated on June 11, 1945, along the current route. On November 24, 1959, the road was extended west 3.5 miles (5.6 km) from near Coldspring, but this extension was transferred to FM 945 on June 28, 1963.

== FM 225 ==
Farm to Market Road 225
- Location: Nacogdoches and Rusk counties
- Length: 53.114 mi (85.479 km)
- Existed: June 11, 1945–present

Farm to Market Road 225 (FM 225) is located in Nacogdoches and Rusk counties. FM 225 runs from Texas State Highway 21 (SH 21) and County Road 780 in Douglass with U.S. Route 79 (US 79) in Henderson.

FM 225 was designated on June 11, 1945, from US 79 in Henderson southward 39.4 miles (63.4 km) to the community of Legg's Store. On September 30, 1955, FM 225 was extended east to SH 21, replacing FM 2111.

== FM 226 ==
Farm to Market Road 226
- Location: Nacogdoches County
- Length: 22.430 mi (36.098 km)
- Existed: June 11, 1945–present

Farm to Market Road 226 (FM 226) is located in Nacogdoches County. FM 226 runs from SH 21 in Oak Ridge to Shirley Creek Park.

FM 226 was designated on June 11, 1945, from SH 21 in Oak Ridge southward 9.3 miles (15.0 km) to south of Woden. On December 10, 1946, the section south of Woden was eliminated, shortening the length to 6.0 miles (9.7 km). On November 23, 1948, the road was extended southeast 11.0 miles (17.7 km) to Etoile. On August 24, 1955, the road was extended south to SH 103. On August 31, 1967, the road was extended south to Shirley Creek Park, its current terminus.

== FM 227 ==
Farm to Market Road 227
- Location: Houston County
- Length: 38.597 mi (62.116 km)
- Existed: June 8, 1945–present

Farm to Market Road 227 (FM 227) is located in Houston County. FM 227 runs from CR 2210 eastward to SH 7 north of Kennard.

FM 227 was designated on June 8, 1945, from SH 21 westward to Augusta. On May 23, 1951, the road was extended west to US 287 (later Loop 531, now Bus US 287-V) in Grapeland. On October 14, 1954, FM 227 was extended west to CR 2225 west of Grapeland, replacing part of FM 228, and southeast to SH 7, replacing FM 1949. On September 21, 1955, the road was extended west to CR 2210. On November 24, 1959, the road was extended west 3.4 miles (5.5 km), but this extension was cancelled on January 25, 1962, because mileage was used for the new FM 2544.

== FM 228 ==
Farm to Market Road 228
- Location: Houston and Anderson counties
- Length: 13.265 mi (21.348 km)
- Existed: June 8, 1945–present

Farm to Market Road 228 (FM 228) is located in Houston and Anderson counties. FM 228 runs from Bus. US 287 in Grapeland to SH 294.

FM 228 was designated on June 8, 1945, from US 287 (now Bus. US 287) westward 3.4 miles (5.5 km). On August 1, 1947, the road was extended northeast 5.7 miles (9.2 km) to Percilla. On November 23, 1948, the road was extended northeast to SH 294. On December 17, 1952, the road was extended west 5.4 miles (8.7 km) to CR 2225. On October 14, 1954, the section west of US 287 (now Bus. US 287) in Grapeland became part of FM 227.

== FM 229 ==
Farm to Market Road 229
- Location: Houston County
- Length: 14.165 mi (22.796 km)
- Existed: June 8, 1945–present

Farm to Market Road 229 (FM 229) is located in Houston County. FM 229 runs from SH 7 in Crockett to FM 2544. FM 229 was designated on June 8, 1945, from SH 7 in Crockett northwestward 2.8 miles (4.5 km). On August 1, 1967, the road was extended northwest 2.8 miles (4.5 km). On November 5, 1971, the road was extended northwest 2.4 miles (3.9 km). On November 25, 1975, the road was extended northwest 1.0 mile (1.6 km). On October 21, 1981, the road was extended northwest 1.7 miles (2.7 km) to near Lake Houston Dam. On August 29, 1989, the road was extended northwest to FM 2544, its current terminus.

== FM 230 ==
Farm to Market Road 230
- Location: Houston, Walker, and Trinity counties
- Length: 29.688 mi (47.778 km)
- Existed: June 8, 1945–present

== FM 231 ==
Farm to Market Road 231
- Location: Houston County
- Length: 3.830 mi (6.164 km)
- Existed: June 8, 1945–present

Farm to Market Road 231 (FM 231) is located in Houston County. It runs from SH 19, about 5 miles (8 km) from Lovelady, to Lone Pine Road, a local county road.

FM 231 was designated on June 8, 1945, along the current route.

== FM 232 ==
Farm to Market Road 232
- Location: Houston County
- Length: 8.148 mi (13.113 km)
- Existed: June 8, 1945–present

Farm to Market Road 232 (FM 232) is a highway in Houston County. It runs from US 287 southeast of Crockett to SH 7.

FM 232 was designated on June 8, 1945, from US 287 southeast of Crockett northward 4.1 miles (6.6 km). On September 21, 1955, the road was extended north to SH 7, its current terminus.

== FM 233 ==
Farm to Market Road 233
- Location: Trinity County
- Length: 4.949 mi (7.965 km)
- Existed: June 8, 1945–present

Farm to Market Road 233 (FM 233) is located in Trinity County. It runs from FM 357 west of Centralia to FM 358.

FM 233 was designated on June 8, 1945, from SH 7 in Kennard southeastward 3.1 miles (5.0 km). On October 25, 1955, the road was extended southeast 3.7 miles (6.0 km). On May 22, 1956, the road was extended southeast to FM 357. On May 5, 1966, an extension southeast 2.6 miles (4.2 km) to the end of FM 2976 was designated, but was unnumbered at the time. On May 23, 1966, FM 233 became part of FM 357, and FM 233 was reassigned to the previously unnumbered extension and all of FM 2976, but this did not take effect until January 1, 1967.

== FM 234 ==
Farm to Market Road 234
- Location: Jackson County
- Length: 22.021 mi (35.439 km)
- Existed: June 12, 1945–present

Farm to Market Road 234 (FM 234) is located in Jackson County. It runs from US 59 west of El Toro to FM 616 in Vanderbilt.

FM 234 was designated on June 12, 1945, from US 59 in El Toro southeast to Vanderbilt and southwest to La Salle, with another section from SH 35 in Port Lavaca to the Victoria County line, creating a gap. On May 23, 1951, the road was extended northwest 3.4 miles (5.5 km) to a road intersection. On November 20, 1951, the road was extended northwest and southwest 3.1 miles (5.0 km) to another road intersection. On October 18, 1954, the section from Vanderbilt to La Salle became part of FM 616. On May 23, 1955, the section from SH 35 in Port Lavaca to the Victoria County line was renumbered FM 1090, eliminating the gap. On May 2, 1962, the road was extended southeast to US 59 2 miles (3.2 km) west of El Toro.

== FM 235 ==
Farm to Market Road 235
- Location: Cherokee County
- Length: 10.577 mi (17.022 km)
- Existed: May 23, 1951–present

Farm to Market Road 235 (FM 235) is located in Cherokee County. It runs from SH 110 in New Summerfield to SH 204 near Reklaw.

FM 235 was designated on May 23, 1951, running 4.7 miles (7.6 km) from SH 110 eastward. The route was extended on November 20, 1951, to its current length.

=== FM 235 (1945) ===
Farm to Market Road 235
- Location: Jackson County
- Existed: June 12, 1945–June 1, 1948

A previous route numbered FM 235 was designated on June 12, 1945, from SH 111 east 1 mile (1.6 km) and west 2 miles (3.2 km) to the Navidad/Edna Road. FM 235 was cancelled on June 1, 1948, because mileage was used for the newly designated FM 822.

== FM 236 ==
Farm to Market Road 236
- Location: DeWitt and Victoria counties
- Length: 28.185 mi (45.359 km)
- Existed: June 11, 1945–present

Farm to Market Road 236 (FM 236) is located in DeWitt and Victoria counties. It runs from US 87 in Cuero to US 59 west of Victoria.

FM 236 was designated on June 11, 1945, from US 87 in Cuero southeast 3.2 miles (5.1 km) to the Guadalupe River. On November 20, 1951, the road was extended south 4.4 miles (7.1 km) to Arneckeville, resulting in the cancellation of FM 1721. On December 18, 1951, the road was extended southward 3.9 miles (6.3 km). On December 17, 1952, the road was extended to the Victoria County line. On January 16, 1953, the road was extended to US 59 west of Victoria, replacing FM 1515.

== FM 237 ==
Farm to Market Road 237
- Location: DeWitt and Victoria counties
- Length: 20.785 mi (33.450 km)
- Existed: June 11, 1945–present

Farm to Market Road 237 (FM 237) is located in DeWitt and Victoria counties. It runs from SH 72 in Yorktown to FM 236.

FM 237 was designated on June 11, 1945, from SH 72 in Yorktown southeast 3.0 miles (4.8 km). On November 23, 1948, the road was extended southeast 3.7 miles (6.0 km). On July 21, 1949, the road was extended southeast to SH 29. On October 28, 1953, the road was extended southeast to the Victoria County line, replacing FM 2034. One day later the road was extended to FM 236.

== FM 238 ==
Farm to Market Road 238
- Location: DeWitt County
- Length: 4.151 mi (6.680 km)
- Existed: June 11, 1945–present

Farm to Market Road 238 (FM 238) is located in DeWitt County. It runs from FM 240 southwestward in direction of Nopal.

FM 238 was designated on June 11, 1945, from US 87 at Westhoff southwest 6.5 miles (10.5 km) in the direction of Nopal. On January 16, 1953, 2.1 miles (3.4 km) were transferred to FM 240.

== FM 239 ==
Farm to Market Road 239
- Location: DeWitt County
- Length: 3.432 mi (5.523 km)
- Existed: June 11, 1945–present

Farm to Market Road 239 (FM 239) is located in DeWitt County. It runs from SH 72 at Nordheim southeast 3.5 miles (5.6 km).

FM 239 was designated on June 11, 1945, along the current route.

== FM 240 ==
Farm to Market Road 240
- Location: DeWitt County
- Length: 16.547 mi (26.630 km)
- Existed: June 11, 1945–present

Farm to Market Road 240 (FM 240) is located in DeWitt County. It runs from US 87 at Westhoff southward to SH 72 in Yorktown.

FM 240 was designated on June 11, 1945, from SH 119 north of Yorktown northward 4.0 miles (6.4 km). On March 29, 1949, the road was extended north 0.8 miles (1.3 km) to Kubla Store. On December 17, 1952, the road was extended north to FM 238. On January 16, 1953, the road was extended north to US 87, replacing a section of FM 238. On December 18, 1953, the road was extended south along the old route of SH 119 to SH 72. On November 13, 2025, the north end was temporarily cut back to the then-proposed Carter Avenue extension in Westhoff. On June 24, 2026, the road was re-extended to US 87 via the new Carter Avenue extension.

== FM 241 ==
Farm to Market Road 241
- Location: Cherokee County
- Length: 12.827 mi (20.643 km)
- Existed: May 23, 1951–present

Farm to Market Road 241 (FM 241) is located in Cherokee County. It runs from FM 752 south of Rusk, southeastward to SH 21 at Linwood.

FM 241 was designated on May 23, 1951, from FM 752, southeastward to US 69. On December 17, 1952, the road was extended to SH 21.

=== FM 241 (1945) ===
Farm to Market Road 241
- Location: DeWitt County
- Existed: June 11, 1945–April 16, 1946

A previous route numbered FM 241 was designated on June 11, 1945, from SH 29, 10 miles (16 km) north of Cuero, to US 77 near Yoakum. On April 16, 1946, FM 241's designation was cancelled as mileage was used by the newly created FM 682.

== FM 242 ==
Farm to Market Road 242
- Location: Sabine County
- Length: 1.714 mi (2.758 km)
- Existed: May 23, 1951–present

Farm to Market Road 242 (FM 242) is located in Sabine County. It runs from SH 21 to Toledo Bend Reservoir.

FM 242 was designated on May 23, 1951, from SH 21 southeastward 4.3 miles (6.9 km) to a road intersection. On January 31, 1969, the length was shortened to 2.1 miles (3.4 km) as the eastern section was inundated by Toledo Bend Reservoir. On August 26, 1969, the road was shortened to its current length.

=== FM 242 (1945) ===
Farm to Market Road 242
- Location: DeWitt County
- Existed: June 11, 1945–April 16, 1946

A previous route numbered FM 242 was designated on June 11, 1945, from SH 29, 1 mile (1.6 km) south of a junction with SH 111, to the Concrete/Yoakum Road. On April 16, 1946, FM 242's designation was cancelled as mileage was used by the newly created FM 682.

== RM 243 ==
Ranch to Market Road 243
- Location: Williamson and Burnet counties
- Length: 20.484 mi (32.966 km)
- Existed: June 11, 1945 (Note: RM 243 was previously designated as FM 243 from 1945 to 1957.)–present

Ranch to Market Road 243 (RM 243) is located in Williamson and Burnet counties.

RM 243 was designated on June 11, 1945, as Farm to Market Road 243 (FM 243). The designation was changed to RM 243 on October 31, 1957.

== FM 244 ==
Farm to Market Road 244
- Location: Grimes County
- Length: 21.260 mi (34.215 km)
- Existed: June 6, 1945–present

Farm to Market Road 244 (FM 244) is located in Grimes County. It runs from FM 39 at Iola to SH 90 at Anderson.

FM 244 was designated on June 6, 1945, from Navasota to Piedmont. On January 27, 1949, a section from Keith to Piedmont was added. On October 28, 1953, the road was extended north to FM 39. On October 8, 1970, the section from FM 3090 to SH 6 was transferred to FM 3090, while FM 244 was rerouted over the former route of FM 3090.

== FM 245 ==
Farm to Market Road 245
- Location: Potter and Carson counties
- Length: 2.569 mi (4.134 km)
- Existed: December 17, 1956–present

Farm to Market Road 245 (FM 245) is a designation that has been used three times. The current use is in Potter and Carson counties, from SH 136 to FM 683 as a replacement of a portion of FM 683 (which was rerouted over FM 293 spur).

=== FM 245 (1945–1954) ===
Farm to Market Road 245
- Location: Grimes County
- Existed: June 12, 1945–March 24, 1954

The first use of FM 245 was in Grimes County, on June 6, 1945, from SH 6 to Wallace Prairie. On October 25, 1947, the road was extended 3.0 miles (4.8 km) to Retreat. FM 245's designation was cancelled on June 25, 1954; 9.2 miles (14.8 km) of the road were combined with FM 362. One portion was transferred to FM 2988 later.

=== FM 245 (1954–1955) ===
Farm to Market Road 245
- Location: Palo Pinto County
- Existed: November 13, 1954–October 7, 1955

The second use of FM 245 was in Palo Pinto County, from US 281 to the Parker County line. FM 245's designation was cancelled on October 7, 1955, and transferred to FM 1885.

== FM 246 ==
Farm to Market Road 246
- Location: Navarro and Freestone counties
- Length: 8.895 mi (14.315 km)
- Existed: June 11, 1945–present

Farm to Market Road 246 (FM 246) is located in Navarro and Freestone counties. It runs from US 75 northwest of Streetman southwest to FM 27 east of Wortham.

FM 246 was designated on June 11, 1945, from Wortham to Streetman. On June 26, 1946, the eastern terminus was revised to Birdsten Cemetery northeast of Streetman, replacing FM 640 which started at the Navarro County line. On January 27, 1948, the route was modified to show a concurrency with US 75. On July 25, 1951, the road was extended northeast 3.0 miles (4.8 km) to a road intersection. On October 26, 1954, the road was extended to Winkler. On November 22, 1954, the road was extended to FM 488, replacing FM 1695. On September 10, 1968, the section from US 75 to FM 488 was renumbered as FM 416.

== FM 247 ==
Farm to Market Road 247
- Location: Madison County and Walker counties
- Length: 25.525 mi (41.079 km)
- Existed: June 11, 1945–present

Farm to Market Road 247 (FM 247) is located in Madison and Walker counties. It runs from SH 21 in Midway to SH 30 in Huntsville.

FM 247 was designated on June 11, 1945, from Huntsville to the Madison County line. Four days later, the road was extended to Midway.

== FM 248 ==
Farm to Market Road 248
- Location: Cass and Marion counties
- Length: 18.473 mi (29.729 km)
- Existed: June 11, 1945–present

Farm to Market Road 248 (FM 248) is located in Cass County. It runs from SH 43 in Bivins to SH 49 northeast of Jefferson.

FM 248 was designated on June 11, 1945, from SH 49 northeast of Jefferson to Lodi. On November 20, 1951, the road was extended northeast FM 125 at Kildare. On May 6, 1952, the road was extended to SH 43 at Bivins, replacing FM 996.

== FM 249 ==
Farm to Market Road 249
- Location: Cass County
- Length: 9.990 mi (16.077 km)
- Existed: June 11, 1945–present

Farm to Market Road 249 (FM 249) is located in Cass County. It runs from US 59 in Atlanta to the Arkansas state line.

FM 249 was designated on June 11, 1945, from SH 77 east to Bloomburg. On September 12, 1946, FM 249 was extended east to the Arkansas state line. In 1963, a new route of SH 77 was under construction, and FM 249 would be extended west over the old route of SH 77. It was completed by early 1967, when FM 249 was extended west to Downtown Atlanta replacing part of the old route of SH 77, and FM 1635 was created as a redesignation of the remainder of the old route of SH 77.

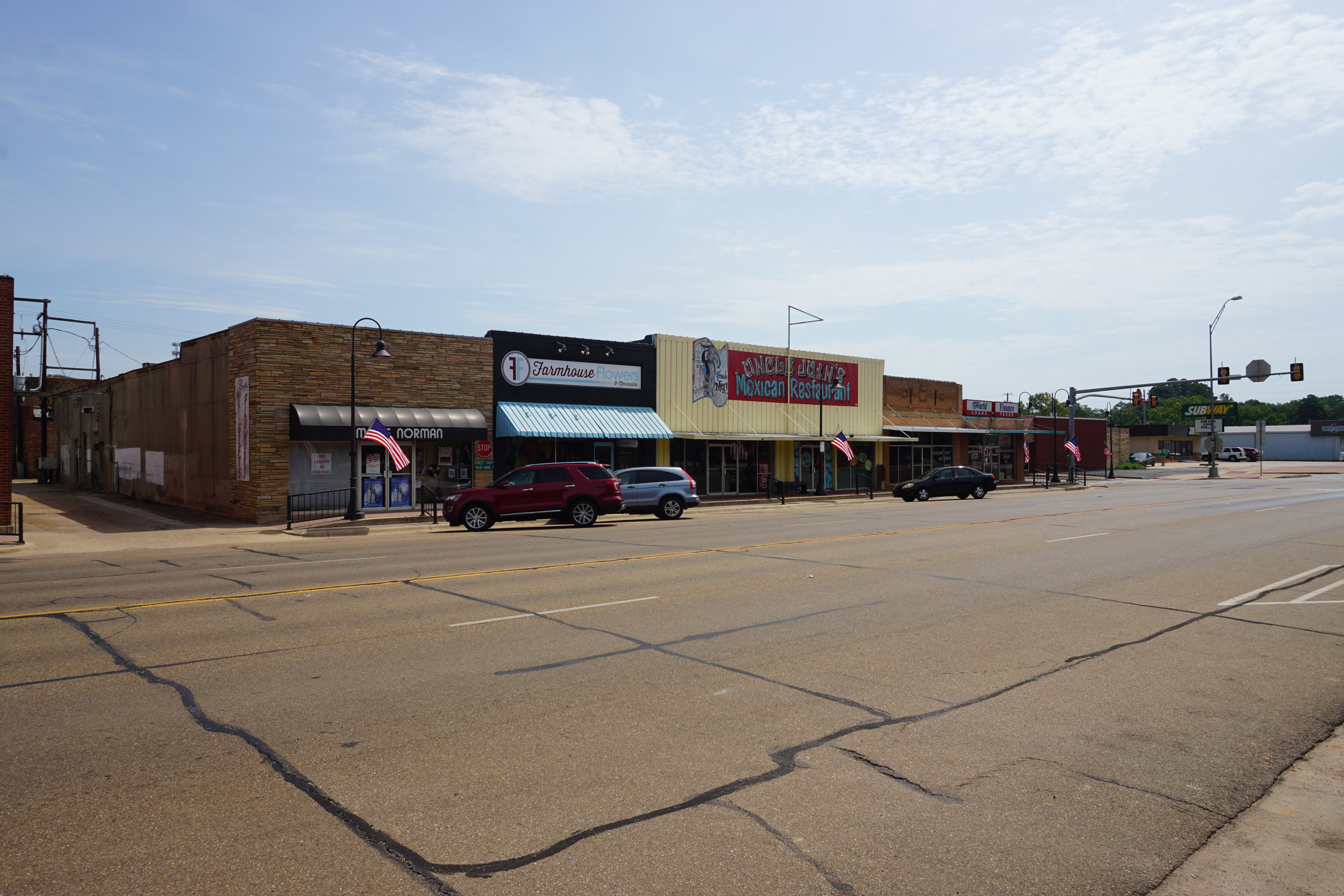
FM 249 in Atlanta

== FM 250 ==
Farm to Market Road 250
- Location: Cass and Morris counties
- Length: 23.004 mi (37.021 km)
- Existed: June 11, 1945–present

Farm to Market Road 250 (FM 250) is located in Cass and Morris counties. It runs from SH 77 near Marietta through Marietta and Hughes Springs to SH 26.

FM 250 was designated on June 11, 1945, from Marietta to Hughes Springs. On September 26, 1945, the road was extended north to SH 77 (this portion was formerly Spur 97 which replaced SH 245). On May 22, 1947, FM 250 was extended to SH 26 at or near the Lone Star Steel Plant, bringing the road to its current length.

== FM 251 ==
Farm to Market Road 251
- Location: Cass County
- Length: 24.957 mi (40.164 km)
- Existed: June 11, 1945–present

Farm to Market Road 251 (FM 251) is located in Cass County. It runs from FM 125 near McLeod to the Arkansas state line.

FM 251 was designated on June 11, 1945, to run from Atlanta southeast to a point near McLeod. On August 25, 1949, the road was extended northeast to the Arkansas state line.

== FM 252 ==
Farm to Market Road 252
- Location: Jasper County
- Length: 19.239 mi (30.962 km)
- Existed: June 12, 1945–present

Farm to Market Road 252 (FM 252) is located in Jasper County. It runs from US 190 southwest of Jasper to FM 1013 in Kirbyville.

FM 252 was designated on June 12, 1945, from Loop 7 in Jasper southwest 6.4 miles (10.3 km) toward Erin, and from Eclipse to Kirbyville. On January 18, 1946, the section from Loop 7 in Jasper southwest was shortened to 4.0 miles (6.4 km). On February 5, 1946, the section from Eclipse to Kirbyville was cancelled. On August 27, 1959, the 1.1-mile (1.8 km) section from US 190 to Loop 7 (now Curtis Street) in Jasper was cancelled. On November 26, 1969, the road was extended south 1.0 mile (1.6 km). On May 7, 1970, the road was extended southwest 2.0 miles (3.2 km). On June 12, 1974 (connecting section designated May 7), the road extended 3.6 miles (5.8 km) to FM 1005, and replaced FM 2831 south of there.

== FM 253 ==
Farm to Market Road 253
- Location: Jasper and Newton counties
- Length: 11.028 mi (17.748 km)
- Existed: June 12, 1945–present

Farm to Market Road 253 (FM 253) is located in Jasper and Newton counties. It runs from SH 62 in Buna east 11.0 miles (17.7 km).

FM 253 was designated on June 12, 1945, from SH 62 in Buna eastward 4.0 miles (6.4 km). On November 23, 1948, the road was extended east 5.3 miles (8.5 km) to SH 87 at Bingham's Store. On June 28, 1963, the road was extended east 1.1 miles (1.8 km) from SH 87.

== FM 254 ==
Farm to Market Road 254
- Location: Jasper County
- Length: 2.695 mi (4.337 km)
- Existed: June 12, 1945–present

Farm to Market Road 254 (FM 254) is located in Jasper County. It runs from FM 2799 to Graham Church.

FM 254 was designated on June 12, 1945, from SH 63 8.0 miles (12.9 km) northwest of Jasper northwest to Graham Church. On August 1, 1947, the beginning point was changed to SH 63 6.0 miles (9.7 km) west of Jasper, though SH 63 was rerouted on November 20, 1958; the intersecting road was redesignated as FM 2799.

== FM 255 ==
Farm to Market Road 255 (FM 255) is a designation that has been used twice. No highway currently uses the FM 255 designation.

=== FM 255 (1945) ===
Farm to Market Road 255
- Location: Tyler, Jasper and Newton counties
- Existed: June 12, 1945–August 21, 1978

The first route numbered FM 255 was designated on June 12, 1945. The route is now part of RE 255.

=== FM 255 (1989) ===
Farm to Market Road 255
- Location: Webb County
- Existed: January 30, 1989–June 30, 2005

The second route numbered FM 255 was designated on January 30, 1989. An August 29, 1990 minute order updated the route. This route is now part of SH 255.

== FM 256 ==
Farm to Market Road 256
- Location: Tyler County
- Length: 30.656 mi (49.336 km)
- Existed: June 13, 1945–present

Farm to Market Road 256 (FM 256) is located in Tyler County. It runs from US 190 northwestward to US 69 at Colmesneil and southwestward and southward to US 190; and from another point on US 190, southward.

FM 256 was designated on June 13, 1945, from US 69 in Colmesneil southwest via Dies to US 287. On January 19, 1953, the road was extended southeast to US 190, replacing FM 1417. On October 19, 1960, the road was extended southwest and south to a point south of US 190, replacing FM 257.

== FM 257 ==
Farm to Market Road 257
- Location: Nueces County
- Length: 0.828 mi (1,333 m)
- Existed: June 2, 1967–present

Farm to Market Road 257 (FM 257) is located in Nueces County. It runs from I-69E/US 77 to Bus. US 77 (formerly Loop 428) in Bishop.

FM 257 was designated on June 2, 1967, along the current route.

=== FM 257 (1945) ===
Farm to Market Road 257
- Location: Tyler County
- Existed: June 12, 1945–October 19, 1960

A previous route numbered FM 257 was designated on June 12, 1945, from US 190 near Woodville south 4.3 miles (6.9 km) to Harmony. On November 21, 1956, the road was extended north 2.6 miles (4.2 km), creating a concurrency with US 190. On September 21, 1960, FM 257 was extended north to US 287. FM 257 was cancelled on October 19, 1960, and transferred to FM 256.

== FM 258 ==
Farm to Market Road 258
- Location: El Paso County
- Length: 16.61 mi (26.73 km)
- Existed: June 11, 1945–present

Farm to Market Road 258 (FM 258) is located in El Paso County. Its western terminus is at SH 20 in the Ysleta section of El Paso. Its eastern terminus is at FM 1110 near Fabens.

FM 258 was designated on June 11, 1945, from US 80 (now SH 20) near Ysleta, south 17 miles (27 km) along the south side of US 80, to another point on US 80 near Fabens. On June 27, 1995, the section from SH 20 in Ysleta southeast to FM 1110 was redesignated Urban Road 258 (UR 258). On July 28, 2016, the western section along Old Pueblo Road from SH 20 south to Socorro Road was cancelled and returned to El Paso, while FM 258 was rerouted along Socorro Road to Zaragoza Road and SH 20. The designation of the extant section reverted to FM 258 with the elimination of the Urban Road system on November 15, 2018.

== FM 259 ==
Farm to Market Road 259
- Location: El Paso County
- Length: 1.163 mi (1.872 km)
- Existed: June 11, 1945–present

Farm to Market Road 259 (FM 259) is located in El Paso County. It runs from the New Mexico state line to SH 20.

FM 259 was designated on June 11, 1945, from US 80 (present-day SH 20) at Canutillo west to the state line at NM 28. On October 31, 1958, the designation was extended 0.9 miles (1.4 km) east to I-10. On February 1, 1962, a break in the route was added at US 80. On September 1, 1965, the extension to I-10 was transferred to Loop 375. On June 27, 1995, the entire route was redesignated Urban Road 259 (UR 259). The designation reverted to FM 259 with the elimination of the Urban Road system on November 15, 2018.

== FM 260 ==
Farm to Market Road 260
- Location: El Paso County
- Existed: June 11, 1945–August 28, 2003

Farm to Market Road 260 (FM 260) was located in El Paso County. The route ran along Country Club Road, as it provided primary access to the El Paso Country Club. No highway currently uses the FM 260 designation.

FM 260 was designated on June 11, 1945, from US 80 (now SH 20) at White's Spur west to the New Mexico state line. On December 16, 1948, the road was extended north to FM 259. On October 13, 1954, two sections totaling 0.7 miles (1.1 km) were added; these sections were removed on April 15, 1976. On June 26, 1991, SH 178 was designated, and FM 260's section south of SH 178 was to be cancelled upon its completion. On June 27, 1995, the entire route was transferred to Urban Road 260 (UR 260). On May 28, 1998, the section from the then-future intersection of SH 178 to SH 20 was removed from the highway system. The remainder of the route was cancelled on August 28, 2003.

== FM 261 ==
Farm to Market Road 261
- Location: Crosby and Dickens counties
- Length: 23.912 mi (38.483 km)
- Existed: June 11, 1945–present

Farm to Market Road 261 (FM 261) is located in Crosby and Dickens counties. It runs from FM 651 to Spur 21 in Spur.

FM 261 was designated on June 11, 1945, from Spur 21 south and west 5.5 miles (8.9 km). On December 10, 1946, the road was extended west 1.0 mile (1.6 km). On December 18, 1953, the road was extended west 7.8 miles (12.6 km) to the Crosby County line. On September 1, 1954, the road was extended west to FM 651, replacing FM 2082 (connecting section designated July 1).

== FM 262 ==
Farm to Market Road 262
- Location: Foard County
- Length: 8.275 mi (13.317 km)
- Existed: June 11, 1945–present

Farm to Market Road 262 (FM 262) is located in Foard County. It runs from FM 98 southward to a road intersection south of Thalia.

FM 262 was designated on June 11, 1945, from US 70 in Thalia north 2.0 miles (3.2 km). On April 20, 1949, the road was extended south 3.8 miles (6.1 km), replacing FM 1040. On May 6, 1964, the road was extended north to FM 98, its current terminus.

== FM 263 ==
Farm to Market Road 263
- Location: Foard County
- Length: 4.989 mi (8.029 km)
- Existed: June 11, 1945–present

Farm to Market Road 263 (FM 263) is located in Foard County. It runs from SH 283 west 5 miles (8.0 km) through Foard City.

FM 263 was designated on June 11, 1945, along the current route.

== FM 264 ==
Farm to Market Road 264
- Location: Dickens County
- Length: 3.648 mi (5.871 km)
- Existed: June 11, 1945–present

Farm to Market Road 264 (FM 264) is located in Dickens County. It runs from US 82 to FM 193 in McAdoo.

FM 264 was designated on June 11, 1945, along the current route.

== FM 265 ==
Farm to Market Road 265
- Location: Dickens County
- Length: 9.662 mi (15.549 km)
- Existed: June 11, 1945–present

Farm to Market Road 265 (FM 265) is located in Dickens County. It runs from FM 193 east of Afton to US 82.

FM 265 was designated on June 11, 1945, to run from US 62 (now SH 70) east to 1 mile (1.6 km) east of Afton. On December 10, 1946, the section east of Afton was cancelled, shortening the distance to 2.5 miles (4.0 km). On July 15, 1949, the road was extended east and south 5.3 miles (8.5 km) to a road intersection. On May 23, 1951, the road was extended south 5.0 miles (8.0 km) to Croton (current junction with FM 2470). On December 17, 1952, the road was extended south to US 82. On November 21, 1960, the section from FM 193 to SH 70 became part of FM 193.

== FM 266 ==
Farm to Market Road 266
- Location: Knox and Haskell counties
- Length: 32.397 mi (52.138 km)
- Existed: June 4, 1945–present

Farm to Market Road 266 (FM 266) is located in Knox and Haskell counties. It runs from US 82 via Hefner and Goree to SH 222.

FM 266 was designated on June 4, 1945, from Goree north 3.0 miles (4.8 km) towards Hefner. On September 9, 1947, the route description was revised as FM 266 was extended 1.5 miles (2.4 km) using mileage taken from FM 143. On November 16, 1953, the road was extended east and north 8.4 miles (13.5 km) miles to US 82, 1.5 miles (2.4 km) west of the Baylor County line, replacing FM 1044 (connecting section designated October 28). On November 1, 1956, the road was extended south 5.8 miles (9.3 km) to FM 1587. On May 2, 1962, the road was extended southwest 8 miles (13 km) from FM 1720 to FM 1080, creating a gap. On May 24, 1962, the gap was closed, replacing a section of FM 1587, and the road was extended south 10.3 miles (16.6 km) to SH 24 (now US 380), replacing a section of FM 1080. On September 5, 1973, the section from FM 1587 to FM 1720 was signed (but not designated) as SH 222. On August 29, 1990, this section (along with all of FM 143 and FM 1587 and the section of FM 1720 east of FM 266; FM 143 was later reassigned to another highway) was cancelled as the SH 222 designation became official.

== FM 267 ==
Farm to Market Road 267
- Location: Foard and Knox counties
- Length: 43.199 mi (69.522 km)
- Existed: June 4, 1945–present

Farm to Market Road 267 (FM 267) is located in Foard and Knox counties. It runs from US 70 east of Crowell to US 82, and from another point on US 82 to US 277 south of Munday.

FM 267 was designated on June 4, 1945, to run from US 82 north and west 10.5 miles (16.9 km) to Gilliland. On January 7, 1948, the road was extended south to SH 222 west of Munday, replacing a portion of SH 222 that was previously SH 252 (and SH 201 for a short time before that). On November 23, 1948, the road was extended west 3.0 miles (4.8 km). On May 23, 1951, the road was extended west to SH 283 (now SH 6). On November 30, 1954, the section from SH 283 east to 1 mile (1.6 km) east of Gilliland was transferred to FM 1756, and the road was rerouted on new construction to end at US 70 east of Crowell. On April 30, 1987, the road was extended south and east to US 277.

== FM 268 ==
Farm to Market Road 268
- Location: Childress and Hardeman counties
- Length: 20.870 mi (33.587 km)
- Existed: June 11, 1945–present

Farm to Market Road 268 (FM 268) is located in Childress and Hardeman counties in northern Texas.

FM 268 begins at an intersection with US 287 in the town of Childress. The highway runs through the town along NE 3rd Street and leaves the town near Fair Park. FM 268 runs in a northeast direction before turning to the east near FM 2530. It intersects FM 2884 and FM 1033. FM 268 enters Hardeman County before turning to the south at Howeth Road/Newton Road. The highway continues to run south and intersects US 287 again before ending at an intersection with Roberts Road.

FM 268 was designated on June 11, 1945, running from the northeast corner of Childress eastward 3.0 miles (4.8 km) to near the Childress Community Center. On April 16, 1946, the highway was extended another mile to US 287 in Childress. FM 268 was extended eastward and northward another 6.0 miles (9.7 km) on July 15, 1949, to a point in Childress County. On October 28, 1953, the highway was extended northward another 5.0 miles (8.0 km) to a road intersection. On October 9, 1961, the section from FM 1033 northward was transferred to FM 1033, and FM 268 was instead extended east and south over 6.0 miles (9.7 km) along a new route (designated on September 20, 1961) and 5.9 miles (9.5 km) over FM 2567.

Junction list

County	Location	mi	km	Destinations	Notes
Childress	Childress	0.0	0.0	US 287 (Avenue F NE)	
Childress		1.2	1.9	FM 2530	
Childress		4.0	6.4	FM 2884 north	
Childress		9.0	14.5	FM 1033 – Kirkland	
Hardeman		19.2	30.9	US 287 – Quanah, Childress	
Hardeman		20.9	33.6	Roberts Road	
1.000 mi = 1.609 km; 1.000 km = 0.621 mi

== FM 269 ==
Farm to Market Road 269
- Location: Hopkins County
- Length: 16.646 mi (26.789 km)
- Existed: June 11, 1945–present

Farm to Market Road 269 (FM 269) is located in Hopkins County. It runs from US 67 at Weaver to SH 11 at Pickton, and from another point on SH 11 to FM 69 at Black Oak Church.

FM 269 was designated on June 11, 1945, to run from US 67 to SH 11. On December 31, 1959, the road was extended to FM 69, replacing a section of FM 270 (which was cancelled as the remainder became part of FM 69).

== FM 270 ==
Farm to Market Road 270
- Location: Galveston and Harris counties
- Length: 5.064 mi (8.150 km)
- Existed: October 30, 1970–present

Farm to Market Road 270 (FM 270) is located in Galveston and Harris counties. It runs from FM 646 in League City to NASA Road 1 in Houston.

=== FM 270 (1945) ===
Farm to Market Road 270
- Location: Hopkins County
- Existed: June 11, 1945–December 21, 1959

A previous route numbered FM 270 was designated in Hopkins County on June 11, 1945, on a route from US 67, 5.2 miles (8.4 km) miles east of Sulphur Bluff, to Dike. On November 23, 1948, the road was extended south 4.1 miles (6.6 km) miles to a road intersection, creating a concurrency with US 67. On September 28, 1949, the road was extended south 3.7 miles (6.0 km) miles to SH 11 in Como. On August 8, 1951, the road was extended south 5.5 miles (8.9 km) to a road intersection, replacing FM 1698. On December 17, 1952, the road was extended northeastward 5.8 miles (9.3 km) from Dike to a road intersection. On August 24, 1955, the road was extended east and north to Pickton, creating a concurrency with SH 11. On October 31, 1957, the road was extended north 5.4 miles (8.7 km) to FM 71. On October 31, 1958, the road was extended north 2.0 miles (3.2 km) miles from FM 71. FM 270's designation was cancelled on December 21, 1959; the section from north of FM 71 south to FM 2476 became part of FM 69, and the section from FM 2476 to SH 11 was transferred to FM 269.

== FM 271 ==
Farm to Market Road 271
- Location: Fannin County
- Length: 9.060 mi (14.581 km)
- Existed: June 11, 1945–present

Farm to Market Road 271 (FM 271) is located in Fannin County. It runs SH 78 south of Bonham to FM 68 in Gober.

FM 271 was designated on June 11, 1945, to run from SH 78 southeast 5.3 miles (8.5 km) toward Gober, with sections replacing part of Park Road 24. On February 25, 1949, the road was extended southeast to FM 68 in Gober.

== FM 272 ==
Farm to Market Road 272
- Location: Fannin and Hunt counties
- Length: 11.767 mi (18.937 km)
- Existed: June 11, 1945–present

Farm to Market Road 272 (FM 272) is located in Fannin and Hunt counties. It runs from US 69 in Leonard east and south to US 69 in Celeste.

FM 272 was designated on June 11, 1945, to run from US 69 in Leonard east to the Fannin–Hunt county line near Hickory Creek. On June 25, 1945, another section from Hickory Creek southward to Celeste was created, creating a gap. On February 14, 1947, the road was extended east from the Fannin–Hunt county line to Hickory Creek, closing the gap.

== FM 273 ==
Farm to Market Road 273
- Location: Fannin County
- Length: 23.427 mi (37.702 km)
- Existed: June 11, 1945–present

Farm to Market Road 273 (FM 273) is located in Fannin County. It runs from SH 78 in Bonham to FM 100 in Monkstown.

FM 273 was designated on June 11, 1945, to run from SH 78 7.0 miles (11.3 km) north of Bonham to FM 100 in Monkstown. On January 29, 2004, the road was rerouted to end in SH 78 in Bonham, replacing a portion of FM 898 (which had a section west of there obliterated due to runway extension at Jones Field); the old route became an extension of FM 1396.

== FM 274 ==
Farm to Market Road 274
- Location: Fannin County
- Length: 13.875 mi (22.330 km)
- Existed: June 11, 1945–present

Farm to Market Road 274 (FM 274) is located in Fannin County. It runs from FM 898 northward to FM 1753 at Ravenna, and from another point on FM 1753, northwestward and eastward to SH 78.

FM 274 was designated on June 11, 1945, to run from SH 78 5.5 miles (8.9 km) north of Bonham to Ravenna. On October 26, 1946, the road was extended northwest to Mulberry. On December 17, 1952, the road was extended east from Mulberry to SH 78, with a section of the old route becoming a spur connection. On January 16, 1953, the section from SH 78 to Ravenna became part of an extended FM 1753. On June 1, 1965, the road was extended south to FM 898. On December 29, 1975, the spur connection in Mulberry was transferred to FM 3321.

== FM 275 ==
Farm to Market Road 275
- Location: Hopkins and Rains counties
- Length: 24.228 mi (38.991 km)
- Existed: June 11, 1945–present

Farm to Market Road 275 (FM 275) is located in Hopkins and Rains counties. It runs from SH 11 near the Hopkins–Hunt county line to FM 499, and from another point on FM 499 to US 67, and from another point on US 67 to SH 19.

FM 275 was designated on June 11, 1945, to run from SH 11 southward via Cumby to Miller Grove. On November 23, 1948, the road was extended southeast to SH 19. On December 31, 1959, the section from FM 514 to SH 19 was transferred to FM 514, and the road was rerouted over FM 2299 (which was cancelled) from FM 514 to SH 19.

== FM 276 ==
Farm to Market Road 276
- Location: Sabine County
- Length: 4.878 mi (7.850 km)
- Existed: May 23, 1951–present

Farm to Market Road 276 (FM 276) is located in Sabine County. It runs from SH 87 eastward 4.9 miles (7.9 km).

FM 276 was designated on May 23, 1951, to run from SH 87 eastward 3.6 miles (5.8 km). The road was extended east to its current terminus on September 27, 1960.

=== FM 276 (1945) ===
Farm to Market Road 276
- Location: Hopkins County
- Existed: June 11, 1945–November 23, 1948

A previous route numbered FM 276 was designated on June 11, 1945, from SH 154 near Birthright to Peerless. On November 23, 1948, the road was planned to be extended to Emblem, with the old route to Peerless becoming a spur connection, but FM 276 was cancelled and the road became a portion of FM 71.

== FM 277 ==
Farm to Market Road 277
- Location: Hemphill and Wheeler counties
- Length: 20.338 mi (32.731 km)
- Existed: June 11, 1945–present

Farm to Market Road 277 (FM 277) is located in Hemphill and Wheeler counties. It runs from US 83 16 miles (26 km) south of Canadian east and south to FM 1046 at Allison.

FM 277 was designated on June 11, 1945, to run from US 83 eastward 12.5 miles (20.1 km). On December 16, 1948, the road was extended east and south 7.0 miles (11.3 km) to a road intersection. On November 20, 1951, the road was extended southeast to FM 1046.

== FM 278 ==
Farm to Market Road 278
- Location: Hansford County
- Length: 2.943 mi (4.736 km)
- Existed: June 11, 1945–present

Farm to Market Road 278 (FM 278) is located in Hansford County. It runs from SH 15 and 136 in Gruver to SH 207.

FM 278 was designated on June 11, 1945, to run from SH 117 (later SH 15, now SH 207) north of Stinnett north and west to Morse. On March 31, 1948, the road was rerouted to bypass Morse and go north and east to SH 282 (now SH 207) east of Gruver, while the old route to Morse became a spur connection. On September 14, 1951, the spur connection to Morse was redesignated as FM 1775. On November 21, 1963, the section from SH 15 (now SH 207) to FM 289 was transferred to SH 136, shortening the road to its current routing.

== FM 279 ==
Farm to Market Road 279
- Location: Van Zandt and Smith counties
- Length: 19.522 mi (31.418 km)
- Existed: January 7, 1954–present

Farm to Market 279 is located in Van Zandt and Smith counties. It runs from SH 64 near Ben Wheeler to SH 64 near the Nueces River.

FM 279 was designated on January 7, 1954, along the current route. The route was formerly a section of SH 64.

=== FM 279 (1945) ===
Farm to Market Road 279
- Location: Hutchinson County
- Existed: June 11, 1945–December 7, 1953

A previous route numbered FM 279 was designated on June 11, 1945, from SH 117 east 6.0 miles (9.7 km) miles toward Adobe Walls. On October 29, 1948, the road was extended north to FM 759, replacing FM 760 which ended at the Hansford County line. On July 14, 1949, the road was rerouted northeast to the Hutchinson/Roberts County Line, replacing the short-lived FM 1264 (planned earlier that day), and the section from FM 279 north to FM 759 was cancelled and renumbered FM 760. On May 30, 1950, the section east of FM 760 was cancelled in exchange for the creation of FM 1598. The remainder of FM 279's designation was cancelled on December 7, 1953, and transferred to FM 281.

== FM 280 ==
Farm to Market Road 280
- Location: Hutchinson County
- Length: 9.194 mi (14.796 km)
- Existed: June 11, 1945–present

Farm to Market Road 280 (FM 280) is located in Hutchinson County. It runs from SH 152 northward 9.4 miles (15.1 km).

FM 280 was designated on June 11, 1945, to run from SH 152 northward 5.0 miles (8.0 km). On June 4, 1946, the road was extended north 2.4 miles (3.9 km) with a spur connection to Spring Creek School. On December 7, 1953, the spur connection was transferred to FM 2171. On November 24, 1959, the road was extended north 2.0 miles (3.2 km) to its current terminus.

== FM 281 ==
Farm to Market Road 281
- Location: Hartley, Moore, Hutchinson, Hansford, and Ochiltree counties
- Length: 116.849 mi (188.050 km)
- Existed: June 11, 1945–present

Farm to Market Road 281 (FM 281) is located in the Texas Panhandle. It runs from Bus. US in Dalhart to US 83. There is a concurrency with FM 119 in Sunray.

FM 281 was designated on June 11, 1945, from FM 119 at Sunray east 5.0 miles (8.0 km). On January 18, 1946, the road was extended 4.8 miles (7.7 km) east. On June 4, 1946, the section from the Moore County line to FM 278 was added, creating a gap. This gap was closed on April 30, 1947. On December 17, 1952, the road was extended east to SH 117 (now SH 15) and FM 279. On December 7, 1953, the road was extended west to US 87 and east to FM 760, replacing a section of FM 1712 and all of FM 279, FM 1266, and FM 1899. The remainder of FM 1712 was transferred to FM 807 on December 18, 1959. On October 31, 1958, the road was extended to Spur 276 (now Bus. US 87) in Dalhart. On February 16, 1960, the road was extended east, north, and east to US 83, replacing a section of FM 760 and all of FM 2017 and FM 2389 (connecting section designated on February 5).

== FM 282 ==
Farm to Market Road 282
- Location: Roberts and Gray counties
- Length: 31.431 mi (50.583 km)
- Existed: June 11, 1945–present

Farm to Market Road 282 (FM 282) is located in Roberts and Gray counties. It runs from US 60 in Miami to FM 750.

FM 282 was designated on June 11, 1945, to run from US 60 in Miami westward 9.0 miles (14.5 km). On December 17, 1947, the road was extended west to SH 70. On October 31, 1958, the road was extended west and south to SH 152 and FM 750 and replaced a section of FM 750 (which was rerouted over the FM Spur 750 connection).

== FM 283 ==
Farm to Market Road 283
- Location: Roberts County
- Length: 20.908 mi (33.648 km)
- Existed: June 11, 1945–present

Farm to Market Road 283 (FM 283) is located in Roberts County. It runs from FM 282 west of Miami northwest to SH 70.

FM 283 was designated on June 11, 1945, to run from FM 282 north 6 miles (9.7 km). On January 18, 1946 (agreed February 11, 1946), the road was shortened so that it went north 3.8 miles (6.1 km) from FM 282. On December 17, 1947, the road was extended northwest 3.3 miles (5.3 km). On October 29, 1953, the road was extended northwest 6.0 miles (9.7 km). On October 26, 1954, the road was extended northwest to SH 70.

== FM 284 ==
Farm to Market Road 284
- Location: Briscoe County
- Length: 8.994 mi (14.474 km)
- Existed: May 7, 1970–present

Farm to Market Road 284 (FM 284) is located in Briscoe County. It runs from SH 86 and SH 207 west of Silverton to a road intersection.

FM 284 was designated on June 11, 1945, from US 287 at Claude south 9.7 miles (15.6 km). On December 17, 1952, the road was extended 7.3 miles (11.7 km) south and east to a road intersection. On April 23, 1953, it was extended east 3.0 miles (4.8 km) to a road intersection. On October 16, 1957, a section of FM 284 from FM 2272 eastward was transferred to FM 2272, while FM 284 was rerouted over the old route of FM 2272; a section of FM 146 from FM 2272 south to SH 86 was transferred to FM 284. The southernmost section was previously FM 1304. On October 31, 1958, FM 284 was extended south 5.0 miles (8.0 km) to what later became part of FM 145. On September 1, 1965, the section of FM 284 north of SH 86 was redesignated as SH 207. On May 7, 1970, FM 284 was extended south 4.0 miles (6.4 km) from FM 145.

== FM 285 ==
Farm to Market Road 285
- Location: Randall and Armstrong counties
- Length: 27.746 mi (44.653 km)
- Existed: June 11, 1945–present

Farm to Market Road 285 (FM 285) is located in Randall and Armstrong counties. It runs from US 87 to SH 207.

FM 285 was designated on June 11, 1945, from Wayside west to the Randall County line. The same day the road was extended to US 87. On October 31, 1957, the road was extended south and east to FM 284 (now SH 207), bringing the highway to its current length.

== FM 286 ==
Farm to Market Road 286 (FM 286) is a designation that has been used twice. No highway currently uses the FM 286 designation.

=== FM 286 (1945) ===
Farm to Market Road 286
- Location: Potter and Randall counties
- Existed: June 7, 1945–June 27, 1963

The first route numbered FM 286 was designated on June 7, 1945, from Amarillo to the Randall County line along an extension of Georgia Street. On February 21, 1946, the road was extended south to US 87, replacing FM 680. FM 286 was agreed to be maintained by the city of Amarillo (but remain on the system) on December 17, 1952; this took effect on August 29, 1953. On June 27, 1963, FM 286 was cancelled as the road was no longer needed for state highway purposes.

=== FM 286 (1963) ===
Farm to Market Road 286
- Location: Hill County
- Length: 2.027 mi (3.262 km)
- Existed: June 28, 1963–December 17, 2009

The second route numbered FM 286 was designated on June 28, 1963, from 0.7 miles (1.1 km) miles west of I-35 at Hillsboro east 1.2 miles (1.9 km) miles to a county road 0.5 miles (0.80 km) east of I-35 (at what is now known as Hill College). On June 2, 1967, the road was extended east 1.4 miles (2.3 km) miles to SH 22. On May 29, 2003, by district request, the section from I-35 west to Country Club Road was removed from the highway system and returned to the city of Hillsboro. The remainder of FM 286 was cancelled on December 17, 2009, and returned to the city of Hillsboro.

== FM 287 ==
Farm to Market Road 287
- Location: Stephens County
- Length: 1.741 mi (2.802 km)
- Existed: June 30, 1966–present

Farm to Market Road 287 (FM 287) is a designation that has been used three times. The current use is in Stephens County, from US 183 near Breckenridge to US 180.

=== FM 287 (1945–1948) ===
Farm to Market Road 287
- Location: Oldham County
- Existed: June 11, 1945–August 24, 1948

The first use of the FM 287 designation was from US 66 (now I-40) south to the Deaf Smith County line in Oldham County. FM 287 was cancelled and reassigned as FM 809 to avoid confusion with nearby US 287.

=== FM 287 (1951–1960) ===
Farm to Market Road 287
- Location: Trinity County
- Existed: May 23, 1951–October 14, 1960

The second use of the FM 287 designation was in Trinity County, from SH 45 (now SH 19) west to the Walker County line. FM 287 was cancelled and transferred to FM 230.

== FM 288 ==
Farm to Market Road 288
- Location: Wood County
- Length: 2.202 mi (3.544 km)
- Existed: October 22, 1979–present

Farm to Market Road 288 (FM 288) is located in Wood County. It runs from SH 154, 5 miles (8.0 km) northwest of Quitman, south to SH 182.

FM 288 was designated on October 22, 1979, along the current route.

=== FM 288 (1945) ===
Farm to Market Road 288
- Location: Potter and Randall counties
- Existed: June 7, 1945–June 1, 1960

A previous route numbered FM 288 was designated on June 11, 1945, from Amarillo along an extension of Western Avenue to the Randall County line. On July 2, 1945, the road was extended south to US 87. FM 288 was cancelled on June 1, 1960, and removed from the state highway system as it was in Amarillo city limits and Amariilo would have had to maintain the road.

== FM 289 ==
Farm to Market Road 289
- Location: Kendall County
- Length: 6.921 mi (11.138 km)
- Existed: October 26, 1983–present

Farm to Market Road 289 (FM 289) is located in Kendall County. It runs from I-10, 2.5 miles (4.0 km) southeast of Comfort, southeast 5.2 miles (8.4 km).

FM 289 was designated on October 26, 1983, along the current route.

=== FM 289 (1945) ===
Farm to Market Road 289
- Location: Sherman and Hansford counties
- Length: 43.600 mi (70.167 km)
- Existed: June 11, 1945–September 1, 1965

A previous route numbered FM 289 was designated on June 11, 1945, from Gruver west to the Sherman County line. The same day the section from Stratford east 10 miles (16 km) was added, creating a gap. On September 26, 1945, the eastern section was extended east to SH 282 (now SH 207), replacing Spur 84. On July 31, 1946, the western section was changed to go from Stratford east 8.5 miles (13.7 km). The eastern section's length was changed to 10.8 miles (17.4 km). On December 16, 1948, the road was extended west 6.3 miles (10.1 km) to a road intersection and east from 8 miles (13 km) east of Stratford 9.0 miles (14.5 km). On July 14, 1949, the road was extended 4.0 miles (6.4 km) east from Stratford, closing the gap. On January 1, 1964, the FM 2216-FM 278 section was transferred to SH 136. The remainder of FM 289 was cancelled on September 1, 1965, and transferred to SH 15.

== FM 290 ==
Farm to Market Road 290
- Location: Oldham and Deaf Smith counties
- Existed: June 11, 1945–December 18, 1990

Farm to Market Road 290 (FM 290) was located in Oldham and Deaf Smith counties.

FM 290 was designated on June 11, 1945, from US 66 (now I-40), 1 mile (1.6 km) east of Adrian, south to the Deaf Smith County line. On October 18, 1954, the road was extended south to FM 1412, replacing FM 1956. On December 13, 1956, FM 290 was signed (but not designated) as SH 214. On August 28, 1990, FM 290 was cancelled and officially redesignated as part of SH 214.

== FM 291 ==
Farm to Market Road 291
- Location: Gray and Donley counties
- Length: 21.961 mi (35.343 km)
- Existed: June 11, 1945–present

Farm to Market Road 291 (FM 291) is located in Gray and Donley counties. It runs from SH 273 southeast of Lefors southward to Loop 271 in Alanreed, and from another point on Loop 271, southward to a road intersection.

FM 291 was designated on June 11, 1945, from US 66 (now Loop 271) in Alanreed north 7.6 miles (12.2 km), and from SH 273 south 2.7 miles (4.3 km). On December 29, 1949, the sections were connected. On October 31, 1957, the road was extended south 5.9 miles (9.5 km) to its current terminus.

== FM 292 ==
Farm to Market Road 292
- Location: Parmer County
- Length: 1.998 mi (3.215 km)
- Existed: October 31, 1957–present

Farm to Market Road 292 (FM 292) is located in Farwell in Parmer County. The southern terminus is at New Mexico State Road 348 at the New Mexico state line. It runs east and then north to US 70/US 84. It then continues north to its northern terminus at US 60.

FM 292 was designated on October 31, 1957, from its current southern terminus to US 84. It was extended to US 60 on August 5, 1966.

=== FM 292 (1945) ===
Farm to Market Road 292
- Location: Gray and Carson counties
- Existed: June 11, 1945–October 22, 1955

A previous route numbered FM 292 was designated in Gray County on June 11, 1945, from SH 18 (now SH 70), 16 miles (26 km) south of Pampa, west 2.5 miles (4.0 km) to a rural school. On October 26, 1954, the road was extended north and west into Carson County to FM 295. FM 292 was cancelled on October 22, 1955, and transferred to FM 293.

== FM 293 ==
Farm to Market Road 293
- Location: Potter, Carson, and Gray counties
- Length: 40.315 mi (64.881 km)
- Existed: June 11, 1945–present

Farm to Market Road 293 (FM 293) is located in Potter, Carson, and Gray counties. It runs from SH 136 east to SH 207 in Panhandle, and from US 60 in Panhandle east to SH 70. There is a spur connection north to US 60 east of Panhandle.

FM 293 was designated on June 11, 1945, to go from 5.0 miles (8.0 km) west of Panhandle east through Panhandle to 4.0 miles (6.4 km) east and south of FM Spur 293 (then part of US 60). On March 23, 1949, the road was extended east 8.0 miles (12.9 km) to a road intersection; the intersection road would become part of FM 294 on July 14 on that year. On May 23, 1951, the road was extended west 7.0 miles (11.3 km) to a road intersection. On February 27, 1952, the section east of Panhandle was extended west over the old route of US 60, while the remainder of the old route of US 60 became a spur connection. On December 17, 1952, the road was extended west and south 3.4 miles (5.5 km) to FM 683. On October 28, 1953, the road was rerouted to end at the county line, while the old route became a spur connection. The next day, the road was extended west to SH 136. On September 22, 1955, the road was extended east to SH 70, replacing FM 292 (connecting section designated the day before). On December 17, 1956, the spur connection to FM 683 became part of rerouted FM 683, and the old route of FM 683 was redesignated as FM 245.

== FM 294 ==
Farm to Market Road 294
- Location: Carson and Armstrong counties
- Length: 38.193 mi (61.466 km)
- Existed: June 11, 1945–present

Farm to Market Road 294 (FM 294) is located in Carson and Armstrong counties. It runs SH 152 in Skellytown southward via White Deer to US 287 at Goodnight.

FM 294 was designated on June 11, 1945, to run from US 60 in White Deer southward 5.0 miles (8.0 km). On February 27, 1948, the road was extended north to SH 152 in Skellytown. On July 14, 1949, the road was extended south 6.0 miles (9.7 km). On December 18, 1951, the road was extended south to US 66 (now I-40). On January 27, 1953, the road was extended south to US 287, replacing FM 1929 (connecting section designated on December 17, 1952).

== FM 295 ==
Farm to Market Road 295
- Location: Carson County
- Length: 8.702 mi (14.005 km)
- Existed: June 11, 1945–present

Farm to Market Road 295 (FM 295) is located in Carson County. It runs from Bus. I-40 at Groom northward to FM 293.

FM 295 was designated on June 11, 1945, from US 66 (now Bus. I-40) at Groom northward 2.5 miles (4.0 km). On October 26, 1954, the road was extended north to FM 292 (now FM 293).

== FM 296 ==
Farm to Market Road 296
- Location: Dallam County
- Length: 48.834 mi (78.591 km)
- Existed: June 11, 1945–present

Farm to Market Road 296 (FM 296) is located in Dallam County. It runs from US 385 west and south to SH 102.

FM 296 was designated on June 11, 1945, to run from US 87 at Texline east 10 miles (16 km). On January 18, 1946 (date of agreement May 11, 1946), the road was shortened to end at 7.6 miles (12.2 km) east of Texline. On July 20, 1948, the road was extended south 4.9 miles (7.9 km) to the New Mexico state line and east 5.5 miles (8.9 km), and a section from SH 51 (now US 385) west 7.0 miles (11.3 km) was added. On December 18, 1951, the sections were connected, and the road was extended south 6.0 miles (9.7 km) along the New Mexico state line. On December 1, 1953, the road was extended south to FM 808 (now SH 102).

== FM 297 ==
Farm to Market Road 297
- Location: Dallam and Sherman counties
- Length: 28.740 mi (46.253 km)
- Existed: June 11, 1945–present

Farm to Market Road 297 (FM 297) is located in Dallam and Sherman counties. It runs US 87 in Dalhart eastward to US 287.

FM 297 was designated on June 11, 1945, to run from US 87 in Dalhart east 8.0 miles (12.9 km). On July 20, 1948, the road was extended east 3.0 miles (4.8 km). On May 23, 1951, the road was extended east 4.0 miles (6.4 km) to a road intersection 0.3 miles (0.48 km) east of FM 807. On December 18, 1959, the section from FM 2029 to FM 807 (along with FM 2029 itself) became part of FM 807, and the section east of FM 807 became a spur connection of FM 807. On May 6, 1964, the road was extended east over the spur connection and further east 4.3 miles (6.9 km) to the Dallam–Sherman county line. On June 2, 1967, the road was extended east to US 287.

== FM 298 ==
Farm to Market Road 298
- Location: Bailey and Lamb counties
- Length: 32.560 mi (52.400 km)
- Existed: June 16, 1945–present

Farm to Market Road 298 (FM 298) is located in Bailey and Lamb counties. It runs from the New Mexico state line to FM 303.

FM 298 was designated on June 16, 1945, to run from Baileyboro across SH 214 to Circle Back. On December 16, 1948, the road was extended east 3.5 miles (5.6 km) to a road intersection. On November 20, 1951, the road was extended west 14.0 miles (22.5 km) to the New Mexico state line. On December 17, 1952, the road was extended east 6.0 miles (9.7 km) to FM 303.

== FM 299 ==
Farm to Market Road 299
- Location: Orange County
- Length: 6.200 mi (9.978 km)
- Existed: July 16, 1998–present

Farm to Market Road 299 (FM 299) is a designation that has been used three times. The current designation dates to July 16, 1998, for a proposed loop around Vidor in Orange County. As of 2022, the route is unconstructed and faces opposition.

=== FM 299 (1945–1966) ===
Farm to Market Road 299
- Location: Bailey and Parmer counties
- Existed: June 16, 1945–July 1, 1966

The first FM 299 was designated in Bailey County on June 16, 1945, from Muleshoe north to the Parmer County line, as a replacement of a section of SH 214. On June 24, 1946, the section from Friona south to 4.0 miles (6.4 km) south of Hub was added, creating a gap in the route. On May 22, 1948, the road was extended to US 60, replacing Spur 165. On July 14, 1949, the section from 4 miles (6.4 km) south of Hub to the Bailey County line was added, closing the gap. On December 13, 1956, FM 299 was signed (but not designated) as SH 214. FM 299 was cancelled on January 10, 1966, and officially redesignated as part of SH 214.

=== FM 299 (1967–1968) ===
Farm to Market Road 299
- Location: Bee County
- Existed: June 2, 1967–August 2, 1968

The second FM 299 designation was designated in Bee County on June 2, 1967, from US 59, 0.3 miles (0.48 km) west of the Beeville city limits, northwest and northeast 3.3 miles (5.3 km) to US 181. FM 299 was cancelled on August 2, 1968, and became a portion of FM 351.
