= National Register of Historic Places listings in Somervell County, Texas =

Location of Somervell County in Texas

This is a list of the National Register of Historic Places listings in Somervell County, Texas.

This is intended to be a complete list of properties and districts listed on the National Register of Historic Places in Somervell County, Texas. There are one district and three individual properties listed on the National Register in the county. Two individually listed properties, one of which is part of the district, are designated as both State Antiquities Landmarks and Recorded Texas Historic Landmarks. The district includes additional Recorded Texas Historic Landmarks.

This National Park Service list is complete through NPS recent listings posted March 21, 2025.

== Current listings ==
The locations of National Register properties and districts may be seen in a mapping service provided.

	Name on the Register	Image	Date listed	Location	City or town	Description
1	Barnard's Mill	Barnard's Mill	September 9, 1982 (#82004523)	307 SW Barnard St. 32°13′54″N 97°45′23″W	Glen Rose	State Antiquities Landmark, Recorded Texas Historic Landmarks
2	Glen Rose Downtown Historic District	Glen Rose Downtown Historic District	September 30, 2014 (#14000820)	Around courthouse square bounded by Vernon, Walnut, Bernard, Elm & 100 block, 201, 205 SW Bernard Streets; 32°14′06″N 97°45′20″W	Glen Rose	Includes several Recorded Texas Historic Landmarks
3	Oakdale Park	Oakdale Park	June 15, 2012 (#12000352)	1019 NE. Barnard Street; 32°14′27″N 97°44′38″W	Glen Rose	
4	Somervell County Courthouse	Somervell County Courthouse	August 1, 1979 (#79003008)	Off TX 144; 32°14′06″N 97°45′20″W	Glen Rose	Part of Glen Rose Downtown Historic District; State Antiquities Landmark, Recorded Texas Historic Landmark

== See also ==
- National Register of Historic Places listings in Texas
- Recorded Texas Historic Landmarks in Somervell County
