= Dan Campbell =

American football player and coach (born 1976)

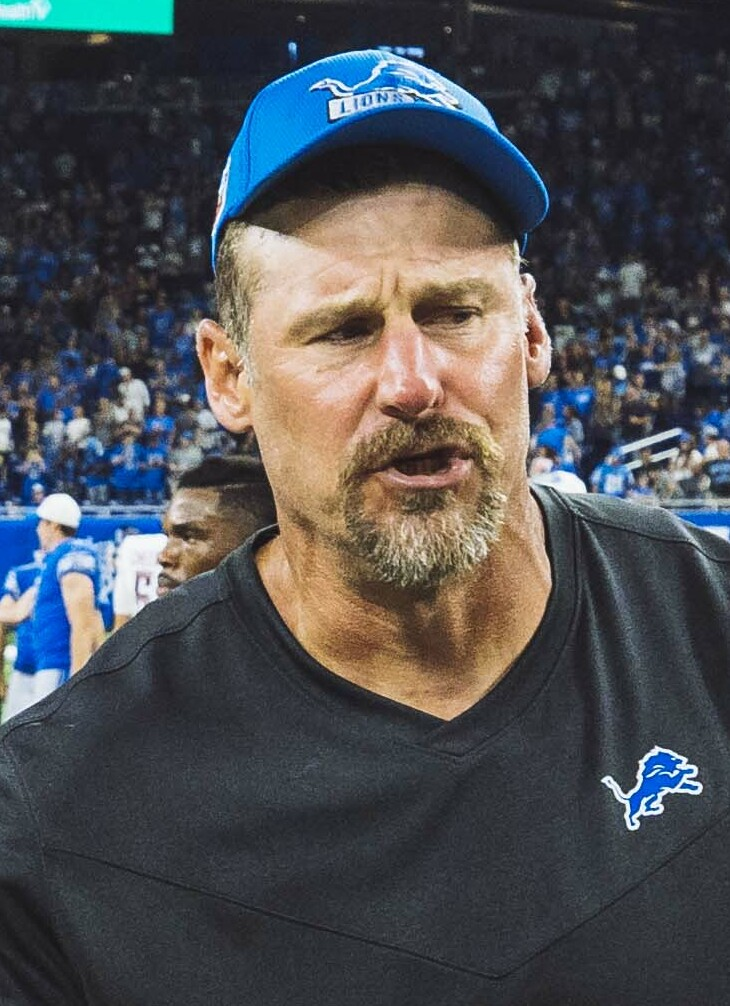
- Campbell as Detroit Lions head coach, 2022

Detroit Lions
- Title: Head coach

Personal information
- Born: April 13, 1976 (age 50); Clifton, Texas, U.S.
- Listed height: 6 ft 5 in (1.96 m)
- Listed weight: 265 lb (120 kg)

Career information
- Position: Tight end (No. 86, 89)
- High school: Glen Rose (Glen Rose, Texas)
- College: Texas A&M (1995–1998)
- NFL draft: 1999: 3rd round, 79th overall pick

Career history

Playing
- New York Giants (1999–2002); Dallas Cowboys (2003–2005); Detroit Lions (2006–2008); New Orleans Saints (2009)

Coaching
- Miami Dolphins (2010–2015); Coaching intern (2010); Tight ends coach (2011–2015); Interim head coach (2015); New Orleans Saints (2016–2020) Assistant head coach & tight ends coach; Detroit Lions (2021–present) Head coach

Awards and highlights
- As a player: Super Bowl champion (XLIV); As a head coach: Greasy Neale Award (2023); The Sporting News NFL Coach of the Year (2023)

Career NFL statistics
- Receptions: 91
- Receiving yards: 934
- Receiving touchdowns: 11
- Stats at Pro Football Reference

Head coaching record
- Regular season: 57–45–1 (.558)
- Postseason: 2–2 (.500)
- Career: 59–47–1 (.556)
- Coaching profile at Pro Football Reference

Daniel Allen Campbell (born April 13, 1976) is an American professional football coach and former tight end who is the head coach for the Detroit Lions of the National Football League (NFL). He previously played in the NFL for 11 seasons. Campbell played college football for the Texas A&M Aggies and was selected by the New York Giants in the third round of the 1999 NFL draft. He was also a member of the Dallas Cowboys, New Orleans Saints, and Detroit Lions.

After retiring as a player, Campbell pursued a coaching career and held his first head coaching position as the interim head coach of the Miami Dolphins in 2015. He was named the head coach of the Lions in 2021. In 2023, Campbell led the Lions to their first division title since 1993, their first playoff win since 1991, and their second-ever NFC Championship Game appearance. The following year, under Campbell, the Lions clinched the No. 1 seed in the NFC for the first time in their history.

== Early life ==
Campbell was born in Meridian, Texas, and attended Glen Rose High School, where he was a tailback and tight end.

== College career ==
Campbell accepted a football scholarship from Texas A&M University. In his last two seasons, he shared the tight end position with Derrick Spiller. As a junior, he posted 12 receptions for 143 yards (11.9-yard average) and two touchdowns. He recorded 7 receptions for 68 yards, one touchdown and 3 special teams tackles.

During his time at Texas A&M, Campbell was roommates with future NFL All-Pro punter Shane Lechler and future TexAgs co-owner Billy Liucci.

== Professional career ==
Pre-draft measurables
Height	Weight	Arm length	Hand span	40-yard dash	10-yard split	20-yard split	20-yard shuttle	Three-cone drill	Vertical jump	Broad jump	Bench press
6 ft 5 1/4 in (1.96 m)	263 lb (119 kg)	31 in (0.79 m)	9 1/4 in (0.23 m)	4.83 s	1.63 s	2.76 s	4.07 s	7.00 s	36.0 in (0.91 m)	10 ft 1 in (3.07 m)	25 reps
All values from NFL Combine

=== New York Giants ===
Campbell was selected by the New York Giants in the third round (79th overall) of the 1999 NFL draft. In 2000, he started four games and was a part of the team that appeared in Super Bowl XXXV. In 2001, he became the team's regular starting tight end after passing Howard Cross on the depth chart and was mainly used as a blocking tight end.

=== Dallas Cowboys ===
Campbell was one of the first free agents to sign with the Dallas Cowboys after Bill Parcells was named the head coach in 2003. He quickly became a team leader and although Jason Witten emerged as the main tight end, Campbell still served as a mentor and remained a key blocker on the offensive line.

In 2004, he only played in three games because of torn ligaments in his foot and was placed on the injured reserve list on September 30.

In 2005, he recovered from an appendectomy on July 27, missing only 10 days of practice and returned to start all four preseason games. The team employed two-tight end sets, which allowed him to start 12 games alongside Witten.

=== Detroit Lions ===
On March 14, 2006, Campbell was signed as a free agent by the Detroit Lions. Known mostly as a blocking tight end, he posted career-highs in receiving yards (308), average per reception (14.7 avg), long reception (30 yards), and touchdowns (four), the most by a Lions tight end since 2001.

On September 22, 2007, he was placed on injured reserve with an elbow injury. On September 9, 2008, he was again placed on injured reserve with a hamstring injury. He was released on February 9, 2009.

=== New Orleans Saints ===
On February 26, 2009, Campbell signed as a free agent with the New Orleans Saints, reuniting with head coach Sean Payton, who was his offensive coordinator with the Cowboys and the Giants. On August 10, he was placed on injured reserve with an MCL injury he suffered in training camp. He spent the entire season on injured reserve and chose to spend his rehab at his home in Texas. He was absent from all Saints games, practices, and team activities for the 2009 season after being injured, and was therefore not granted a Super Bowl ring by the team when they won Super Bowl XLIV.

== NFL career statistics ==
Year	Team	Games		Receiving					Fumbles	
Year	Team	GP	GS	Rec	Yds	Avg	Lng	TD	Fum	Lost
1999	NYG	12	1	—	—	—	—	—	0	0
2000	NYG	16	5	8	46	5.8	13	3	1	1
2001	NYG	16	12	13	148	11.4	25	1	0	0
2002	NYG	16	16	22	175	8.0	27	1	0	0
2003	DAL	16	15	20	195	9.8	23	1	0	0
2004	DAL	3	2	2	16	8.0	9	0	0	0
2005	DAL	16	12	3	24	8.0	18	1	0	0
2006	DET	16	11	21	308	14.7	30	4	0	0
2007	DET	2	1	1	1	1.0	1	0	0	0
2008	DET	1	0	1	21	21.0	21	0	0	0
2009	NO	0	0	Did not play due to injury						
Career		114	76	91	934	10.3	30	11	1	1

== Coaching career ==
=== Miami Dolphins ===
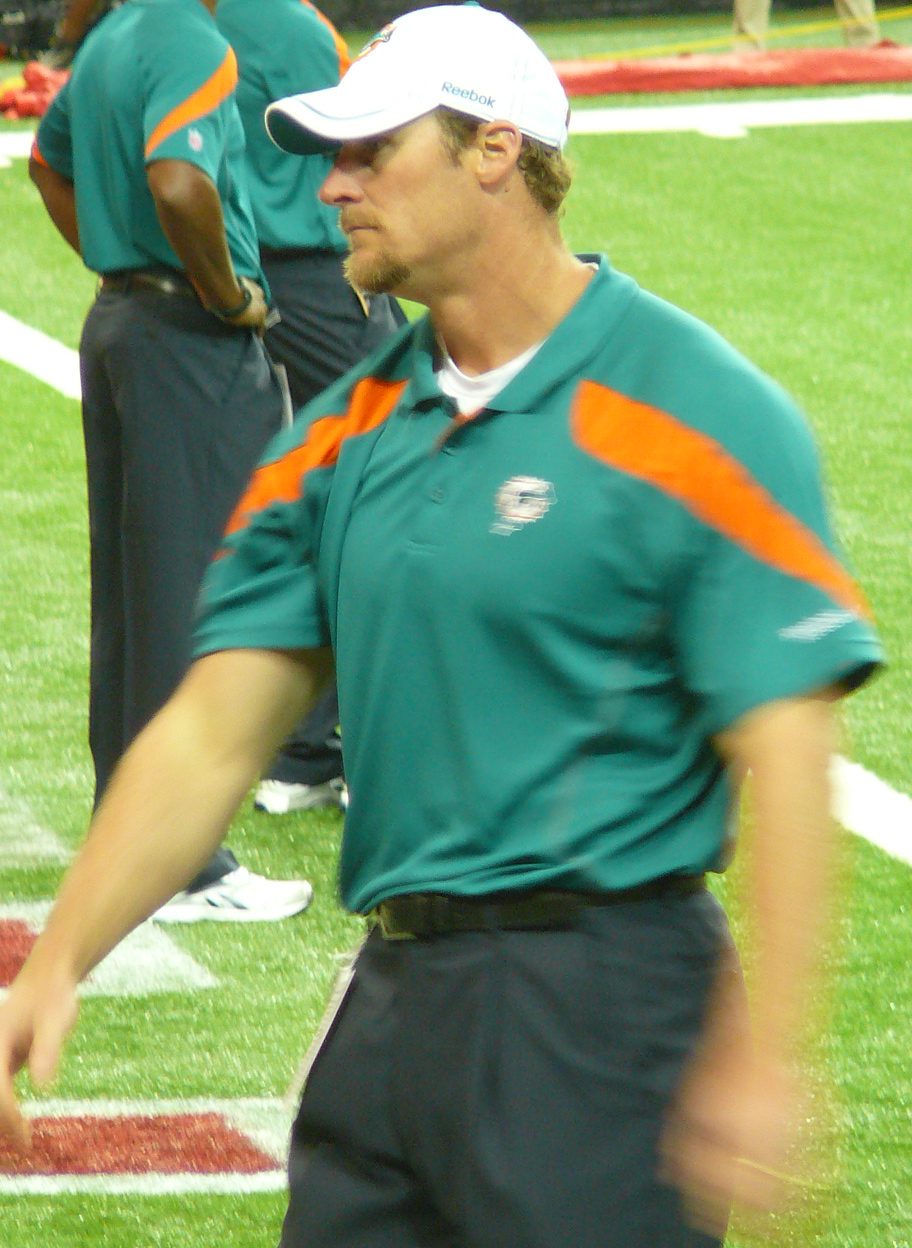
Campbell while a coach for the Miami Dolphins in 2011.

In 2010, Campbell began his coaching career when he was hired by the Miami Dolphins as a coaching intern. In 2011, Campbell was promoted to the tight ends coach. Following the firing of the Dolphins head coach Joe Philbin on October 5, 2015, after a 1–3 start, Campbell was named the interim head coach for the remainder of the 2015 season. Campbell led the team to five wins and seven losses. Ultimately, the Dolphins hired Adam Gase over him.

=== New Orleans Saints ===
In January 2016, Campbell was hired by the New Orleans Saints as their assistant head coach and tight ends coach under head coach Sean Payton.

=== Detroit Lions ===
Campbell was appointed head coach of the Detroit Lions on January 20, 2021. In his introductory press conference the following day, he said, "This team is going to take on the identity of this city, and this city's been down and it's found a way to get up. This team's going to be built on, we're going to kick you in the teeth....We're gonna get knocked down and on the way up, we're going to bite a kneecap off....Before long we're going to be the last one standing. Any loss that we take, we're going to feel the full pain from it and not be numb to it." With the Lions, Campbell has been known for his high level of energy, aggressive play calling, and interactions with the media.

==== 2021 season ====
After starting the season 0–10–1, which included a 16–16 tie against the Pittsburgh Steelers in Week 9, Campbell and the Lions recorded their first victory of the season in Week 13 against the Minnesota Vikings, winning 29–27 with quarterback Jared Goff throwing the game-winning touchdown to rookie Amon-Ra St. Brown as time expired. After winning three of their final six games, Campbell finished his first season with a 3–13–1 record.

==== 2022 season ====
Campbell talking to Ron Rivera in 2022.

After a 1–6 start, Campbell and the Lions had a mid-season turnaround, winning eight of their next ten games to finish the season with a 9–8 record. The Lions clinched their first winning season since 2017 after a win and divisional sweep over the Green Bay Packers in Week 18, knocking the Packers out of the playoffs. However, they themselves had been knocked out of playoff contention earlier in the day when the Seattle Seahawks defeated the Los Angeles Rams in their final game of the season, and with it the tiebreaker over the Lions.

==== 2023 season ====
Campbell and the Lions raced out to an 8–2 start, their best since 1962. A win over the Minnesota Vikings gave the Lions their first division title in 30 years, and also assured them of their first home playoff game since then. They ultimately finished 12–5, tying a franchise record for regular season wins. On January 14, 2024, the Lions beat the Los Angeles Rams 24–23 to secure their first playoff win since 1991. The Lions continued their playoff run on January 21 with a divisional 31–23 win over the Tampa Bay Buccaneers, the first time they had won multiple playoff games since the NFL-AFL merger. In the Lions' first NFC Championship Game appearance in 32 years, they lost by a score of 31–34 to the San Francisco 49ers, surrendering a 24–7 halftime lead. Following the game, Campbell was criticized for being too aggressive in his play-calling, which included him attempting to convert two 4th downs in field goal range and failing to convert both of them. He was also criticized for calling a running play with 1:05 left down 10 points which failed, causing him to have to use a timeout which necessitated an onside kick attempt.

==== 2024 season ====
Campbell and the Lions continued to build on their previous success, becoming 1 of 9 teams in NFL history to win 15 or more games (the Kansas City Chiefs doing so the same year) finishing 15–2 and setting the franchise record for regular season wins. The Lions opened the season hosting the Los Angeles Rams on Sunday Night Football, beating them 26–20 in overtime. After a Week 2 loss to the Tampa Bay Buccaneers, the Lions won 11 straight games- a franchise record- including 3 wins by 38+ points. After suffering a loss to the Buffalo Bills in Week 15, the Lions finished the season on a 3-game win streak.

During the season, the Lions also set a franchise record for PPG (33.2) and finished Top 10 in defense for the first time since 2015. The Lions recorded the 4th highest point differential since 2000 at 222, behind the 2007 New England Patriots, the 2019 Baltimore Ravens, and the 2001 St. Louis Rams.

In Week 18, the Lions secured their first #1 seed in franchise history with a 31–9 win over the Minnesota Vikings. The Lions also swept the NFC North for the first time in franchise history. Campbell continued his aggressive play style, having 22/33 successful fourth down attempts, and setting an NFL record with 151 total attempts across four seasons.

On January 18, 2025, the Lions were upset 45–31 by the Washington Commanders, despite being heavy favorites, in the Divisional Round of the NFL Playoffs. This made them only the second team in NFL history to win 15 games and lose their first playoff game, joining the 2011 Green Bay Packers.

==== 2025 season ====
In Week 10, Campbell took over offensive play calling duties and coached the Lions to a 44–22 win over the Washington Commanders. From Week 11 onwards, Campbell assumed the role of offensive playcaller for the rest season. The Lions finished with a 9–8 record and did not make the playoffs.

== Head coaching record ==
Team	Year	Regular season					Postseason			
Team	Year	Won	Lost	Ties	Win %	Finish	Won	Lost	Win %	Result
MIA	2015*	5	7	0	.417	4th in AFC East	—	—	—	—
MIA total		5	7	0	.417		0	0	.000	
DET	2021	3	13	1	.206	4th in NFC North	—	—	—	—
DET	2022	9	8	0	.529	2nd in NFC North	—	—	—	—
DET	2023	12	5	0	.706	1st in NFC North	2	1	.667	Lost to San Francisco 49ers in NFC Championship Game
DET	2024	15	2	0	.882	1st in NFC North	0	1	.000	Lost to Washington Commanders in NFC Divisional Game
DET	2025	9	8	0	.529	4th in NFC North	—	—	—	—
DET	2026	8	2	0	.800		—	—	—	—
DET total		56	38	1	.595		2	2	.500	
Total		61	45	1	.575		2	2	.500	

*Interim head coach

== Personal life ==
Campbell married his wife, Holly, in 1999, and they have two children.

Campbell is a noted fan of Metallica, and during his time at Texas A&M, he was nicknamed "Dantallica" by his roommate Shane Lechler. He also enjoys country music and classic rock. During his playing career, he was nicknamed "The Dude," due to his resemblance to Jeff Bridges' character in The Big Lebowski. Upon joining the Detroit Lions as head coach, he gained the nickname "MC/DC" by Pat McAfee on his daily radio show. The nickname, a play on AC/DC, is short for Motor City Dan Campbell. Campbell's aggressive, high-risk play-calling has led fans to refer to him as "Ramblin' Gamblin' Dan Campbell".
