= Mosheim, Texas =

Census-designated place in Bosque County, Texas, United States

Coordinates: 31°37′35″N 97°36′00″W

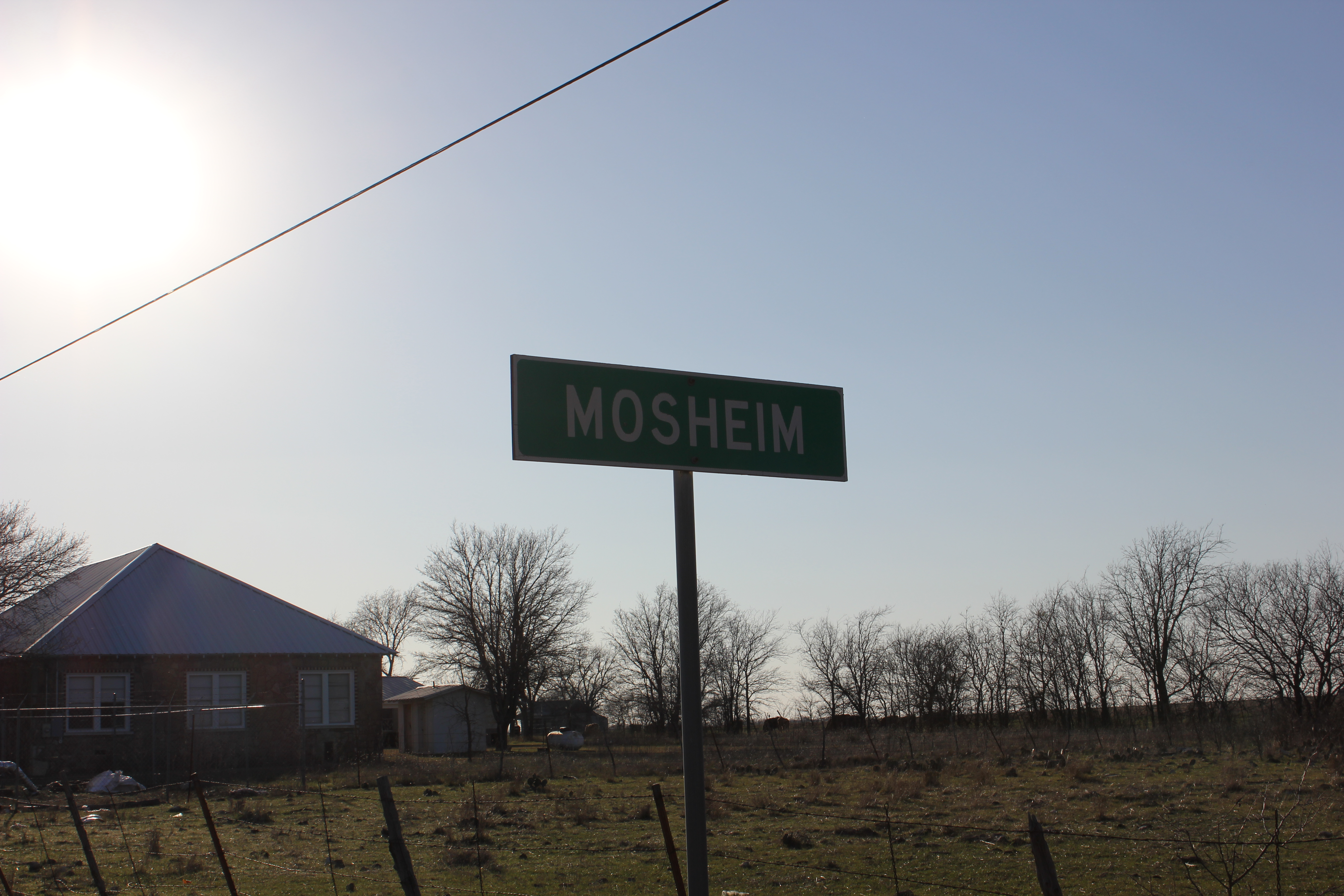
Entering Mosheim on Farm to Market Road 217, March 2013

Mosheim is a census designated place (CDP) in Bosque County in Central Texas, United States. As of the 2020 census, Mosheim had a population of 48.

== Description ==
The town is approximately 7.5 miles (12.1 km) west of Valley Mills and 23 miles (37 km) northwest of Waco.

The town, originally named Live Oak, was settled in the 1850s by Jonathan Dansby. Jeff Howard built the first store in 1886 and it was then called Mosheim. The post office was closed in 1976.

In the mid-1900s, the town had approximately 200 people, with the population declining to 75 in the late 1960s.

== Demographics ==
Historical population
| Census | Pop. | Note | %± |
|---|---|---|---|
| 2020 | 48 | | — |
U.S. Decennial Census; 1850–1900 1910; 1920 1930 1940; 1950 1960 1970; 1980 1990 2000; 2010 2020

Mosheim first appeared as a census designated place in the 2020 U.S. census.

=== 2020 Census ===
Mosheim CDP, Texas – Racial and ethnic composition Note: the US Census treats Hispanic/Latino as an ethnic category. This table excludes Latinos from the racial categories and assigns them to a separate category. Hispanics/Latinos may be of any race.
| Race / Ethnicity (NH = Non-Hispanic) | Pop 2020 | % 2020 |
|---|---|---|
| White alone (NH) | 40 | 83.33% |
| Black or African American alone (NH) | 0 | 0.00% |
| Native American or Alaska Native alone (NH) | 0 | 0.00% |
| Asian alone (NH) | 0 | 0.00% |
| Pacific Islander alone (NH) | 0 | 0.00% |
| Other race alone (NH) | 0 | 0.00% |
| Mixed race or Multiracial (NH) | 0 | 0.00% |
| Hispanic or Latino (any race) | 8 | 16.67% |
| Total | 48 | 100.00% |

== See also ==
- List of census-designated places in Texas
