= Glass, Texas =

- Unincorporated community
- Location within Texas Location within the United States
- Coordinates: 32°11′29″N 97°50′13″W
- Country: United States
- State: Texas
- County: Somervell
- Elevation: 938 ft (286 m)
- Time zone: UTC-6 (Central (CST))
  - Summer (DST): UTC-5 (CDT)
- ZIP code: 76043
- Area code: 254
- GNIS feature ID: 1336567

Glass is an unincorporated community in southwestern Somervell County, Texas, United States. It is located at the intersection of U.S. Route 67 and Farm to Market Road 203, approximately four miles southwest of Glen Rose.

== History ==
The community was most likely first settled in the 1890s. A post office was established in 1904, with general store and cotton gin owner John Sanders becoming postmaster. Sixty residents were reported to be living in Glass by 1910, but that number declined to twenty-five in 1920, all the way down to ten in 1933. The post office stopped service in 1926. The population rose to fifty in 1939 and stayed that number through the late 1960s, the last time population data was recorded.
