= Glen Rose Independent School District =

School district in Texas

Address
- 1102 Stadium Dr Glen Rose, Somervell County, Texas, 76043; United States
- Coordinates: 32.2315918°N 97.7659573°W

District information
- Grades: PK-12
- Superintendent: Trig Overbo
- Governing agency: Texas Education Agency
- Schools: 4
- Budget: $25.37 million (2015-2016)
- NCES District ID: 4820850

Students and staff
- Students: 1,806 (2017-2018)
- Teachers: 131.29 (2017-2018)
- Staff: 255.04 (2017-2018)

Other information
- Website: www.grisd.net

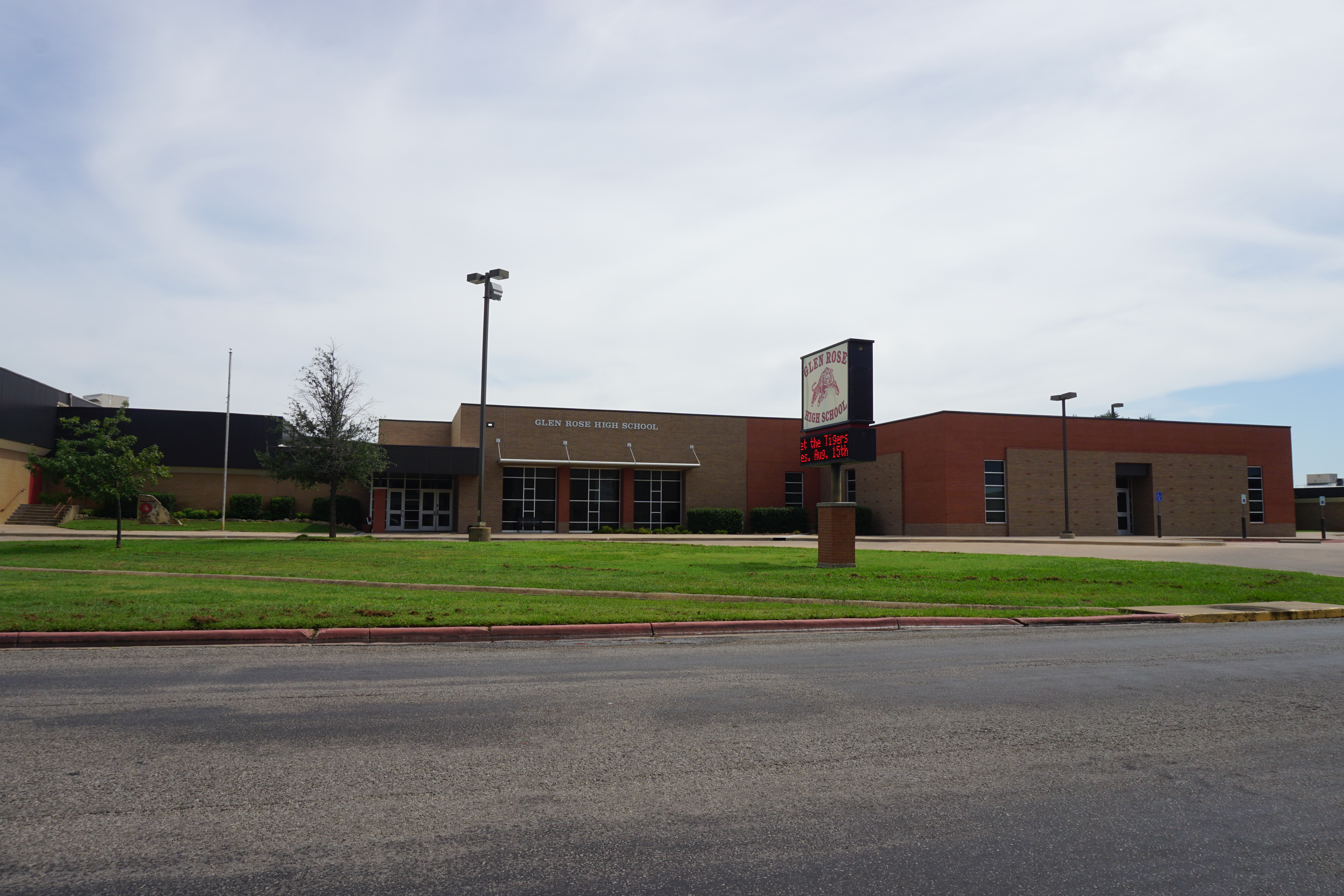
Glen Rose High School

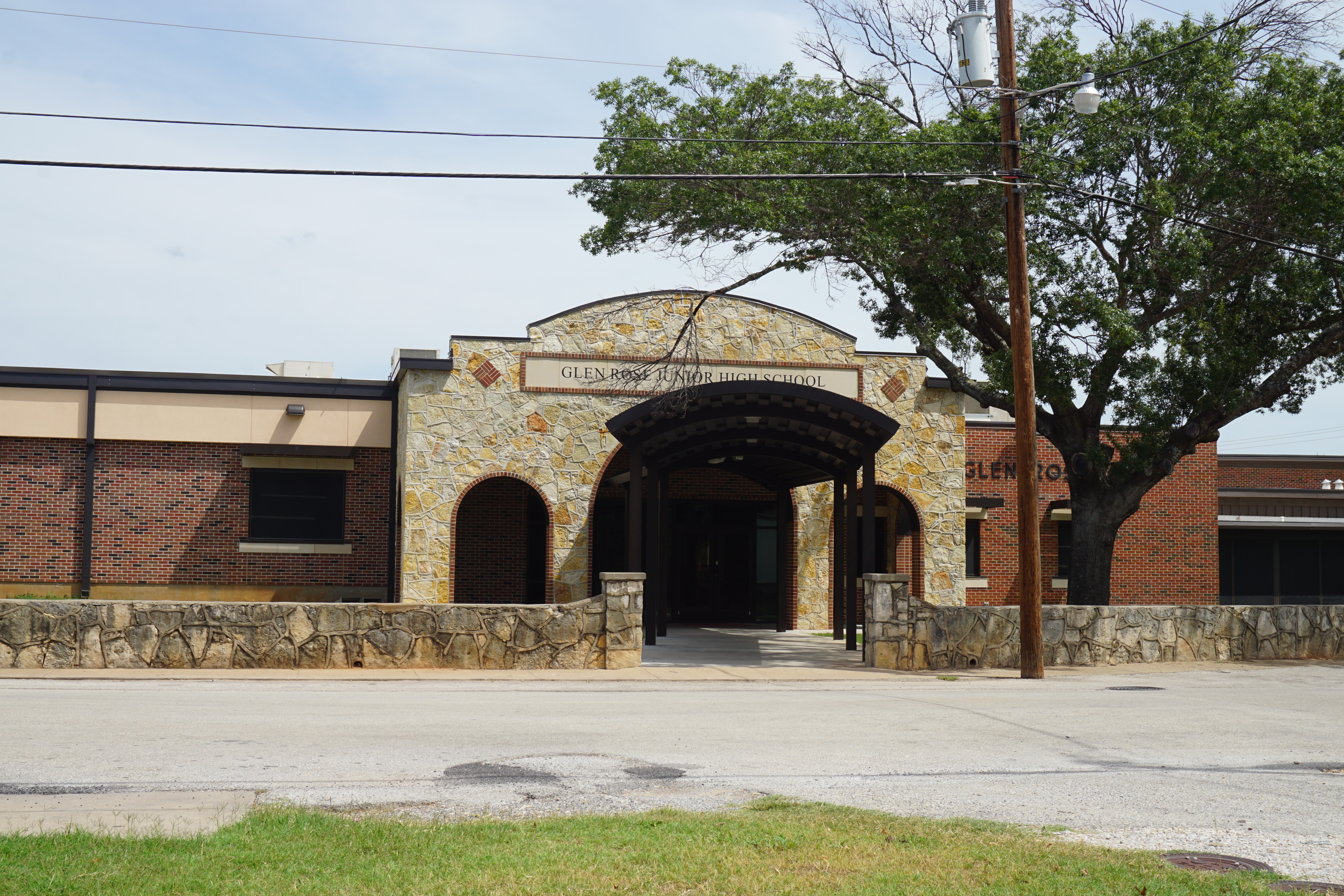
Glen Rose Junior High School

Glen Rose Independent School District is a public school district based in Glen Rose, Texas (United States).

Glen Rose ISD covers most of Somervell County and includes the unincorporated communities of Nemo and Rainbow.

In 2009, the school district was rated "academically acceptable" by the Texas Education Agency.

== Schools ==
- Glen Rose High School (Grades 9-12)
- Glen Rose Junior High (Grades 6-8)
- Glen Rose Intermediate (Grades 3-5)
- Glen Rose Elementary (Grades PK-2)

== Students ==
=== Academics ===
STAAR - At Approaches Grade Level or Above (Sum of All Grades Tested)
Subject	Glen Rose ISD	Region 11	State of Texas
Reading/ELA	86%	76%	74%
Mathematics	86%	82%	81%
Writing	75%	69%	66%
Science	90%	81%	80%
Soc. Studies	88%	81%	78%
All Tests	85%	79%	77%

Students in Glen Rose outperform local region and statewide averages on standardized tests. In 2017-2018 State of Texas Assessments of Academic Readiness (STAAR) results, 85% of students in Brock ISD met Approaches Grade Level standards, compared with 79% in Region 11 and 77% in the state of Texas. The average SAT score of the class of 2017 was 1052, and the average ACT score was 21.0.

=== Demographics ===
In the 2017-2018 school year, the school district had a total of 1,803 students, ranging from pre-kindergarten through grade 12. The class of 2017 included 106 graduates; the annual drop-out rate across grades 9-12 was reported as 0.0%.

As of the 2017-2018 school year, the ethnic distribution of the school district was 63.9% White, 30.4% Hispanic, 0.6% African American, 1.6% Asian, 0.7% American Indian, 0.1% Pacific Islander, and 2.7% from two or more races. Economically disadvantaged students made up 41.5% of the student body.
