= Nemo, Texas =

Unincorporated community Somervell County, Texas, United States

Coordinates: 32°15′36″N 97°39′07″W

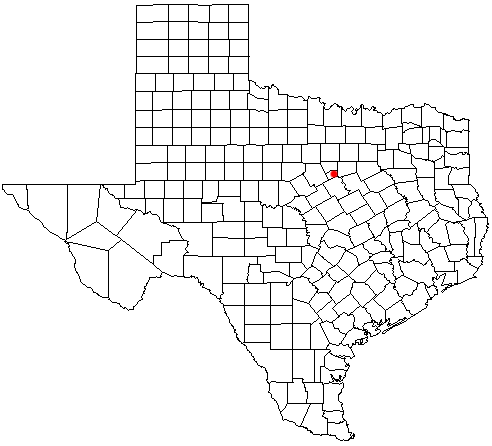
Location of Nemo in the state of Texas

Nemo is an unincorporated community in eastern Somervell County, Texas, United States.

== Description ==
The community is located at the intersection of Farm to Market Roads 199 and 200 and had a population of 56 in 1990. The community is part of the Granbury micropolitan area.

Settlement of the area began in the mid-19th century. Originally called Johnson Station after local settler Jimmie Johnson, residents attempted to receive a post office designation under the same name. The postal authorities, however, suggested a shorter name be used. When the residents met to choose a name, one man argued for the name Nemo, which was Latin for "no one." He also said that if Johnson's name was not good enough, "then no one's was." In 1893, a post office branch under the name Nemo was established.

Nemo's population has never exceeded 60 persons and the community's few students are served by the Glen Rose Independent School District. In the year 2000, Brazos River Charter School opened in Nemo serving the town and the surrounding communities of Glen Rose, Cleburne, Granbury, Bono, George's Creek, and Walnut Springs amongst others.

== See also ==
- List of unincorporated communities in Texas
