= Texas State Highway 144 =

State highway Texas

State Highway 144
- SH 144 highlighted in red

Route information
- Maintained by TxDOT
- Length: 39.027 mi (Note: The certified length given is shorter than the actual mileage, as the TxDOT description of SH 144 considers it to be discontinuous at US 67.) (62.808 km)
- Existed: 1929–present

Major junctions
- South end: SH 22 in Meridian
- US 67 in Glen Rose; US 377 in Granbury
- North end: Bus. US 377 in Granbury

Location
- Country: United States
- State: Texas
- Counties: Bosque, Somervell, Hood

Highway system
- Highways in Texas; Interstate; US; State; Former; Toll; Loops; Spurs; FM/RM; Park; Rec
← SH 143	→ SH 145

State Highway 144 (SH 144) is a 39.027-mile (62.808 km) state highway in Bosque, Somervell, and Hood counties in Texas, United States, that runs from Meridian to Granbury.

== Route description ==
SH 144 begins at an intersection with SH 22 in Meridian. The route travels northwest to Walnut Springs before turning in a more northerly direction. It enters Glen Rose, where it has a one-mile concurrency with US 67. After separating from US 67, the highway resumes its northward journey to Granbury, where it intersects the US 377 bypass. The SH 144 designation ends at an intersection with Bus. US 377 in central Granbury.

== History ==
SH 144 was designated on March 17, 1930, from Glen Rose to Meridian. The road from Cleburne to Walnut Springs was erroneously omitted from the state highway log, but was designated as SH 144T. On November 30, 1932, SH 144T was officially added to the state highway log. On December 8, 1932, SH 144T was decommissioned as the construction on the section of SH 144 from Walnut Springs to Glen Rose was taken over and construction had started on it. On July 12, 1933, it was extended north to Granbury and then northwest via Lipan to Brandon's Bridge. On October 9, 1934, it was rerouted west to northwest of Lipan. On July 15, 1935, everything north of Glen Rose was cancelled as it was not fully built. The section from Glen Rose to Granbury was restored on September 22, 1936. An alignment of the route in Glen Rose was previously designated Spur 216 before being combined with SH 144 on September 26, 1949.

== Major intersections ==
County	Location	mi	km	Destinations	Notes
Bosque	Meridian	0.0	0.0	SH 22 – Hamilton, Waco, Hillsboro, Cleburne	Southern terminus
Bosque	Walnut Springs	10.7	17.2	FM 927 west – Iredell	Southern end of FM 927 concurrency
Bosque	Walnut Springs	11.3	18.2	FM 927 east – Morgan	Northern end of FM 927 concurrency
Bosque		11.9	19.2	FM 203 north	
Somervell		19.1	30.7	FM 202 east – Eulogy, Brazos Point	
Somervell		22.9	36.9	FM 56 south – Eulogy	Southern end of FM 56 concurrency
Somervell	Glen Rose	23.7	38.1	FM 56 north – Stephenville	Northern end of FM 56 concurrency
Somervell	Glen Rose	25.0	40.2	US 67 south – Stephenville	Southern end of US 67 concurrency
Somervell	Glen Rose	26.0	41.8	US 67 north – Cleburne	Noerthern end of US 67 concurrency
Somervell		27.7	44.6	FM 200 south – Rainbow	
Hood		31.9	51.3	FM 2425 north	
Hood		34.3	55.2	FM 2425 east	
Hood	Granbury	39.5	63.6	US 377	Interchange
Hood	Granbury	39.7	63.9	FM 51 south – Paluxy	Southern end of FM 51 concurrency
Hood	Granbury	40.1	64.5	Bus. US 377 / FM 51 north – Stephenville, Weatherford	Northern terminus and northern end of FM 51 concurrency
1.000 mi = 1.609 km; 1.000 km = 0.621 mi

== See also ==
- List of state highways in Texas
