= Rainbow, Texas =

Unincorporated community in Somervell County, Texas, United States

Coordinates: 32°15′56″N 97°42′51″W

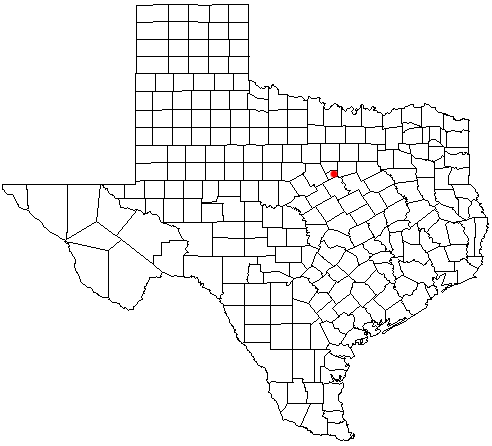
Location of Rainbow in the state of Texas

Rainbow is an unincorporated community in Somervell County, Texas, United States.

== Description ==
The community is located on Farm to Market Road 200, four miles northeast of Glen Rose. The community is a suburb of the Granbury Micropolitan Statistical Area.

The origins of the community's name date back to the 1890s. Area residents requested a post office and gathered to choose a name. During the meeting, a thunderstorm occurred, followed by a rainbow. The residents, struck with the rainbow's beauty, named their town after it.

In the 1920s, Rainbow had a population of approximately 113. The population began to decrease after that period, reaching a low of 40 in 1960. With the opening of nearby Dinosaur Valley State Park in the 1970s, the population increased. Current estimates of Rainbow's population range from 76 to 121.

The Glen Rose Independent School District serves Rainbow area students.

== See also ==
- List of unincorporated communities in Texas
