= Glen Rose, Texas =

- City
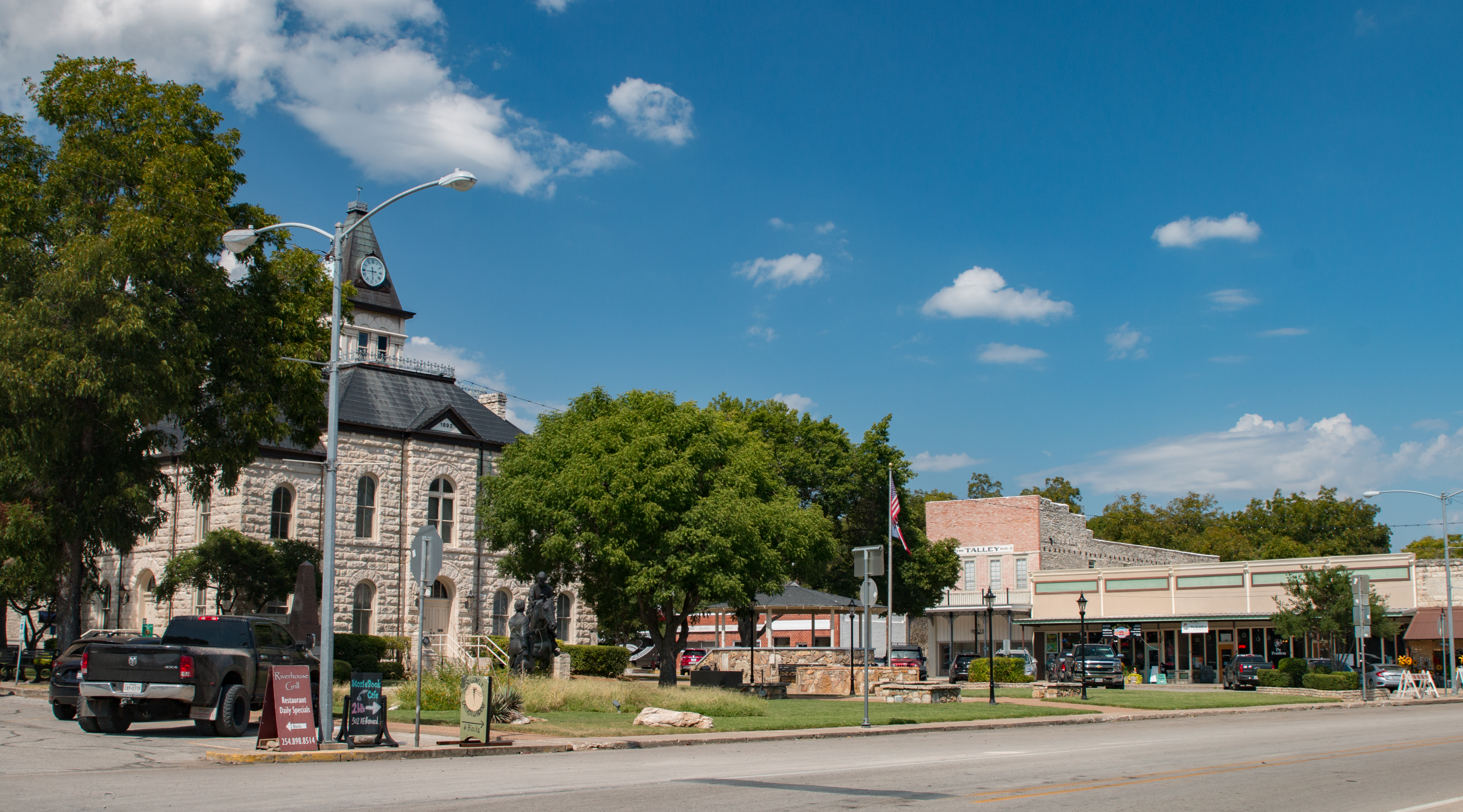
- Downtown Glen Rose in 2019
- Nickname: Dinosaur Capital of Texas
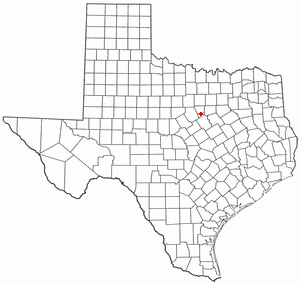
- Location of Glen Rose, Texas

- Coordinates: 32°15′12″N 97°44′40″W
- Country: United States
- State: Texas
- County: Somervell

Area
  - Total: 3.92 sq mi (10.16 km^{2})
  - Land: 3.91 sq mi (10.12 km^{2})
  - Water: 0.015 sq mi (0.04 km^{2})
- Elevation: 614 ft (187 m)

Population (2020)
  - Total: 2,659
  - Density: 680.5/sq mi (262.7/km^{2})
- Time zone: UTC-6 (Central (CST))
  - Summer (DST): UTC-5 (CDT)
- ZIP code: 76043
- Area code: 254 (exchanges 897 and 898)
- FIPS code: 48-29876
- GNIS feature ID: 2410595
- Website: Official City Website

Glen Rose is a city in and the county seat of Somervell County, Texas, United States. As of the 2020 census, the city population was 2,659.

== History ==
=== 19th century ===
The area was first settled in 1849 by Charles Barnard, who opened a trading post near Comanche Peak. After the region became a federal Indian Reservation in 1855, Barnard moved his business to Fort Belknap. Circa 1859 when the reservation was abolished, he returned to the area and built the first store on what is now the site of Glen Rose.

A three-story stone gristmill was constructed along the Paluxy River and the town that grew up around it became known as Barnard's Mill. The mill was sold to Tyler Calhoun Jordan of Dallas in 1871 for $65,000. Tradition states that Jordan's wife, a native of Scotland, decided to rename the town Rose Glen to reflect the area's natural surroundings, although census records show that she was a native of Alabama. The citizens later voted to call the community "Glen Rose". A post office opened in 1874.

When Somervell County was formed on March 15, 1875, Glen Rose was designated as its county seat. A Baptist college was organized in 1879 and was later sold to the Paluxy Baptist Association. In 1889, the northern Presbyterians opened Glen Rose Collegiate Institute (also known as Glen Rose College), which remained in operation for the next 15 to 20 years. A courthouse around Glen Rose's town square was completed around 1892, but burned down a year later. A newly built Romanesque Revival style courthouse was constructed soon after with locally quarried limestone. That building sustained damage in a 1902 tornado that also damaged part of the town square.

=== 20th century ===
From the 1900s to the 1920s, Glen Rose was home to approximately 1,000 people. The area's mineral springs attracted numerous doctors and self-styled healers. During Prohibition, the area was a center of moonshining, and Glen Rose became known as the "whiskey woods capital of the state". The population remained steady during the Great Depression, although unemployment rates in both Glen Rose and Somervell County increased. As part of the New Deal, Glen Rose borrowed $80,000 under the Public Works Administration (PWA) to construct a new water and sewage system. Three low-water dams on the Paluxy River, several local school buildings, and a canning plant were built with Works Projects Administration (WPA) money.

Somervell County's population declined from 3,071 in 1940 to 2,542 in 1950 as many residents moved in search of greater employment opportunities. At the same time, Glen Rose's population grew from 1,050 in 1940 to 1,248 in 1950. The construction of the Comanche Peak Nuclear Power Plant in the mid-1970s brought financial advantages and new residents to the area. The city's population rose 34 percent between 1970 and 1980. The nuclear plant dominated the local economy. Other chief industries include farming, ranching, and tourism. 111 rated businesses were in Glen Rose as of 1991. By 2000, its population had grown to 2,122 and the total number of rated businesses rose to 224.

== Geography ==
Glen Rose is located around the junction of U.S. Highway 67 and State Highway 144 in central Somervell County. The city is situated nearly 17 miles (27 km) south of Granbury and 52 miles (84 km) southwest of Fort Worth. According to the United States Census Bureau, the city has a total area of 2.7 square miles (7.1 km^{2}), all land.

=== Climate ===
The climate in this area is characterized by hot, humid summers and generally mild to cool winters. According to the Köppen Climate Classification system, Glen Rose has a humid subtropical climate, abbreviated "Cfa" on climate maps.

== Demographics ==
Historical population
Census	Pop.	Note	%±
1880	132		—
1890	400		203.0%
1930	983		—
1940	1,050		6.8%
1950	1,254		19.4%
1960	1,422		13.4%
1970	1,554		9.3%
1980	2,075		33.5%
1990	1,949		−6.1%
2000	2,122		8.9%
2010	2,444		15.2%
2020	2,659		8.8%
U.S. Decennial Census

=== 2020 census ===
As of the 2020 census, Glen Rose had a population of 2,659, 993 households, and 693 families residing in the city. The median age was 41.2 years, with 25.7% of residents under the age of 18 and 22.3% aged 65 years or older. For every 100 females there were 85.3 males, and for every 100 females age 18 and over there were 79.6 males age 18 and over.

Of the 993 households, 36.5% had children under the age of 18 living in them. Of all households, 49.3% were married-couple households, 14.6% were households with a male householder and no spouse or partner present, and 32.5% were households with a female householder and no spouse or partner present. About 28.1% of all households were made up of individuals and 13.9% had someone living alone who was 65 years of age or older.

There were 1,104 housing units, of which 10.1% were vacant. The homeowner vacancy rate was 2.2% and the rental vacancy rate was 8.3%.

0.0% of residents lived in urban areas, while 100.0% lived in rural areas.

Racial composition as of the 2020 census
Race	Number	Percent
White	2,035	76.5%
Black or African American	16	0.6%
American Indian and Alaska Native	35	1.3%
Asian	44	1.7%
Native Hawaiian and Other Pacific Islander	0	0.0%
Some other race	176	6.6%
Two or more races	353	13.3%
Hispanic or Latino (of any race)	508	19.1%

=== 2000 census ===
As of the census of 2000, there were 2,122 people, 801 households, and 543 families residing in the city. The population density was 777.6 inhabitants per square mile (300.2/km^{2}). There were 903 housing units at an average density of 330.9 per square mile (127.8/km^{2}). The racial makeup of the city was 91.09% White, 0.28% African American, 0.94% Native American, 0.38% Asian, 5.51% from other races, and 1.79% from two or more races. Hispanic or Latino of any race were 15.32% of the population.

There were 801 households, out of which 36.1% had children under the age of 18 living with them, 48.7% were married couples living together, 14.4% had a female householder with no husband present, and 32.1% were non-families. 29.1% of all households were made up of individuals, and 14.9% had someone living alone who was 65 years of age or older. The average household size was 2.54 and the average family size was 3.13.

In the city, the population was spread out, with 28.4% under the age of 18, 8.1% from 18 to 24, 26.5% from 25 to 44, 19.6% from 45 to 64, and 17.4% who were 65 years of age or older. The median age was 36 years. For every 100 females, there were 88.6 males. For every 100 females age 18 and over, there were 82.0 males.

The median income for a household in the city was $29,837, and the median income for a family was $37,545. Males had a median income of $30,238 versus $19,500 for females. The per capita income for the city was $14,940. About 12.2% of families and 14.7% of the population were below the poverty line, including 17.2% of those under age 18 and 16.2% of those age 65 or over.

Glen Rose is part of the Dallas-Fort Worth-Arlington, TX Metropolitan Statistical Area.

== Parks and recreation ==
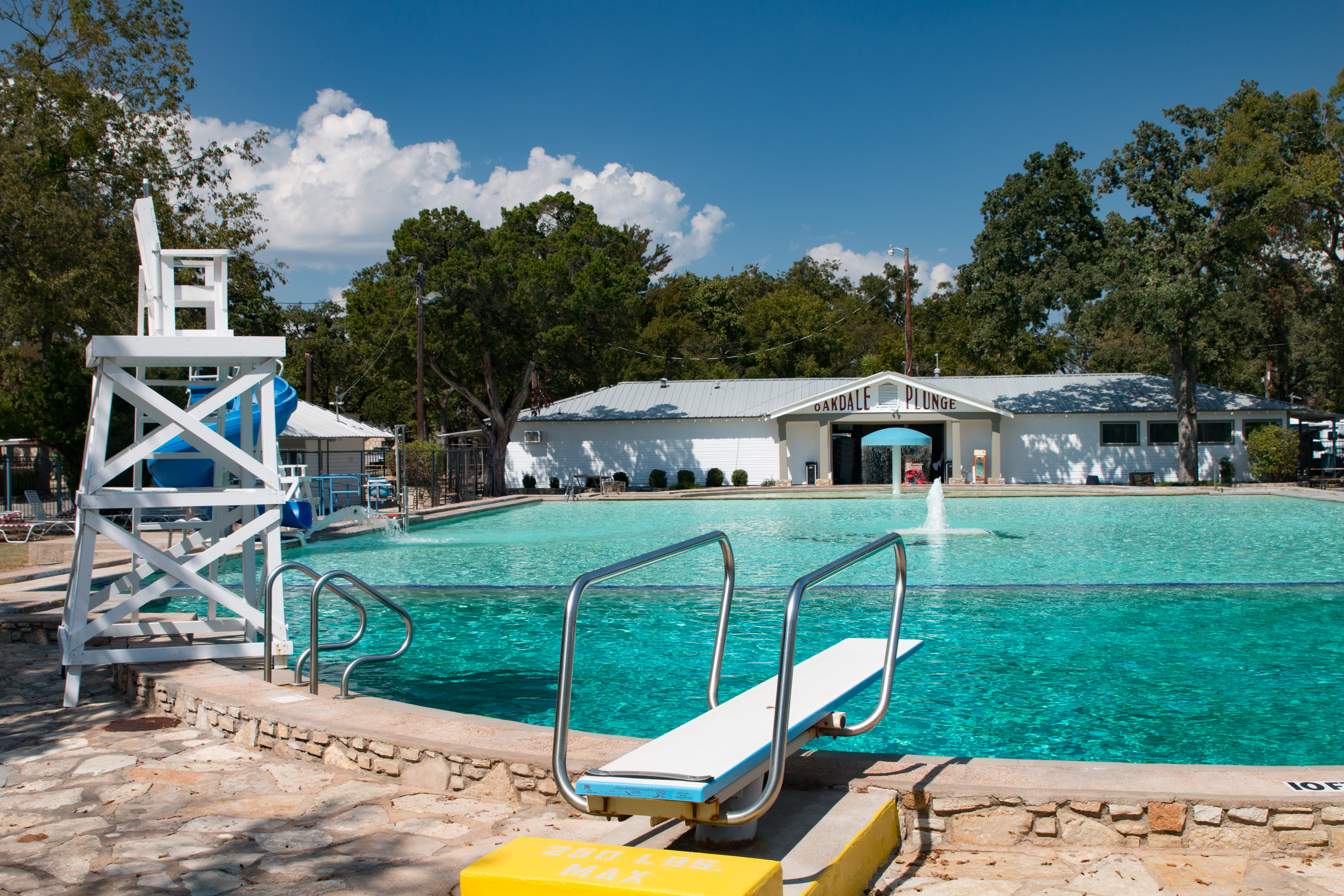
Oakdale Park

Local parks include the Big Rocks Park on the banks of the Paluxy River, Paluxy Heritage Park, and Oakdale Park, which is listed on the National Register of Historic Places.

Glen Rose is the mail center for Dinosaur Valley State Park. Located immediately to the east of the park, it is featured in the State of Texas Dinosaur Valley State Park/Glen Rose smartphone app. The city is called the "Dinosaur Capital of Texas".

== Arts and culture ==
The Texas Amphitheatre is located in Glen Rose, with the Christian play, The Promise in Glen Rose, performed regularly.

== Education ==
Glen Rose is served by the Glen Rose Independent School District.

== Media ==
Two newspapers have offices located in Glen Rose, the Glen Rose Reporter and the Glen Rose Newspaper. Local television stations that provide coverage for the area are from the Dallas-Fort Worth and the Waco/Temple/Killeen (Central Texas) metropolitan areas. Glen Rose is also served by Tarleton State University's National Public Radio affiliate KTRL 90.5 FM.

== Notable people ==
- Dan Campbell — professional football player and coach
- John Graves — author of Goodbye to a River
- Sammy Hale — baseball player
- Brooke Rollins — 33rd Secretary of the US Department of Agriculture
- Ivan Stang — writer, co-founder of the Church of the SubGenius
