= Pendell, Texas =

- Ghost town
- Location within Texas Location within the United States
- Coordinates: 31°42′50″N 97°32′29″W
- Country: United States
- State: Texas
- County: Bosque
- Elevation: 600 ft (180 m)
- Time zone: UTC-6 (Central (CST))
  - Summer (DST): UTC-5 (CDT)
- Area code: 254
- GNIS feature ID: 1380899

Pendell is a ghost town in Bosque County, in the U.S. state of Texas.

== History ==
The only operating business in Pendell was a service station, with the community having a population from 20 to 25 in the 1940s. It was abandoned by the next decade and no longer appeared on maps in 1984.

== Geography ==
Pendell was located near the eastern bank of the Bosque River, 5 mi (8.0 km) northwest of Valley Mills and 23 mi (37 km) northwest of Waco in southern Bosque County.

== Education ==
Today, Pendell is located within the Clifton Independent School District.
