= Greenock, Texas =

- Ghost town
- Location within Texas Location within the United States
- Coordinates: 31°45′59″N 97°20′44″W
- Country: United States
- State: Texas
- County: Bosque
- Elevation: 637 ft (194 m)
- Time zone: UTC-6 (Central (CST))
  - Summer (DST): UTC-5 (CDT)
- Area code: 254
- GNIS feature ID: 1379858

Greenock is a ghost town in Bosque County, in the U.S. state of Texas.

== History ==
A post office was established at Greenock on January 1, 1882, and remained in operation until June 6, 1916. A general store opened in 1892. The community had a population between 20 and 35 in the late 1800s but seemingly disappeared afterward.

== Geography ==
Greenock was located off Farm to Market Road 2490, 10 mi (16 km) northeast of Valley Mills and 23 mi (37 km) northwest of Waco in southeastern Bosque County.

== Education ==
Greenock had its own school in the 1890s and remained in operation until 1916. There was also a separate school for black children. Today, Greenock is located within the Valley Mills Independent School District.
