= Iredell High School =

Iredell School

Location
- 501 McLain Street; Iredell, Bosque County, Texas 76649; United States; 31.986425°N 97.869431°W

Information
- School type: Public, high school
- Locale: Rural: Remote
- School district: Iredell ISD
- NCES School ID: 482436002714
- Principal: Patrick Murphy
- Faculty: 18.21 (on an FTE basis)
- Grades: PreK‍–‍12
- Enrollment: 135 (2023‍–‍2024)
- Student to teacher ratio: 7.41
- Colors: Gold and white
- Team name: Dragons
- Website: Official website

Iredell High School, also known as Iredell School, is a public high school located in Iredell, Texas. It is the sole high school in the Iredell Independent School District and is classified as a 2A school by the University Interscholastic League. During 2022‍–‍2023, Iredell High School had an enrollment of 142 students and a student to teacher ratio of 8.35. The school received an overall rating of "A" from the Texas Education Agency for the 2024‍–‍2025 school year

== Athletics ==
The Iredell Dragons compete in the following sports:

- Baseball
- Basketball
- Cross Country
- 6-Man Football
- Golf
- Tennis
- Track and Field
