= Kopperl High School =

Kopperl School

Location
- 175 County Road 1240; Kopperl, Bosque County, Texas 76652; United States; 32.072925°N 97.500530°W

Information
- School type: Public, high school
- Locale: Rural: Remote
- School district: Kopperl ISD
- Superintendent: Kenneth Bateman
- NCES School ID: 481557001129
- Principal: Katrina Adcock
- Teaching staff: 16.00 (FTE)
- Grades: PreK‍–‍12
- Enrollment: 128 (2023‍–‍2024)
- Student to teacher ratio: 8.00
- Colors: Red, blue, and white
- Team name: Eagles
- Website: Official website

Kopperl High School, also known as Kopperl School, is a public high school located in Kopperl, Texas. It is the sole high school in the Kopperl Independent School District and is classified as a 1A school by the University Interscholastic League. During 2022‍–‍2023, Kopperl School had an enrollment of 186 students and a student to teacher ratio of 10.57. The school received an overall rating of "D" from the Texas Education Agency for the 2024‍–‍2025 school year

== Athletics ==
The Kopperl Eagles compete in the following sports:

- Baseball
- Basketball
- 6-Man Football
- Golf
- Softball
- Tennis
- Track and Field
- Volleyball
