= Cayote, Texas =

- Unincorporated community
- Location within Texas Location within the United States
- Coordinates: 31°46′08″N 97°27′27″W
- Country: United States
- State: Texas
- County: Bosque
- Elevation: 722 ft (220 m)

Population (2000)
  - Total: 75
- Time zone: UTC-6 (Central (CST))
  - Summer (DST): UTC-5 (CDT)
- Area code: 254
- GNIS feature ID: 1378102

Cayote (also Coyote) is an unincorporated community in Bosque County, Texas, United States. According to the Handbook of Texas, the community had a population of 75 in 2000.

== History ==
John Cox built a grocery store two miles south of the Cayote town site in 1866–67; after he sold it in 1870, the new owners moved it to the town site. The owners called their town Coyote after the many coyotes living in the area; a later spelling mistake gave the town its current name. A post office opened at Cayote in 1879, and the town later grew to include a gristmill and cotton gin. In the 1890s, the community reached its peak population of 100. The post office closed the following decade. Cayote's population fell to 25 by 1933 but climbed to 75 over the next ten years; it has remained at 75 since.

== Geography ==
Cayote is located on Farm to Market Road 56 along the banks of Childress Creek, 7 mi (11 km) north of Valley Mills and 23 mi (37 km) northwest of Waco in southeastern Bosque County.

=== Climate ===
The climate in this area is characterized by hot, humid summers and generally mild to cool winters. According to the Köppen Climate Classification system, Cayote has a humid subtropical climate, abbreviated "Cfa" on climate maps.

== Education ==
Cayote is served by the Valley Mills Independent School District.
