= Morgan High School (Texas) =

Morgan School

Location
- 1306 Charles Street; Morgan, Bosque County, Texas 76671; United States; 32.019370°N 97.606046°W

Information
- School type: Public, high school
- Established: 1883
- Locale: Rural: Remote
- School district: Morgan ISD
- Superintendent: Dr. John C. Bullion
- NCES School ID: 483138003520
- Principal: Tiffany Berrio
- Faculty: 31 (on an FTE basis)
- Grades: PreK‍–‍12
- Enrollment: 148 (2023‍–‍2024)
- Student to teacher ratio: 10.34
- Colors: Green and white
- Athletics conference: UIL Class A
- Team name: Eagles
- Website: Official website

Morgan High School, also known as Morgan School, is a public high school located in Morgan, Texas, United States. The school falls within Education Service Center Region Twelve. It is the sole high school in the Morgan Independent School District and is classified as a 1A school by the UIL. For the 2024-25 school year, the school received a "C" rating by the Texas Education Agency.

During the spring semester of the 24-25 school year, Morgan ISD became the first school of its size to be chosen for a site visit by Commissioner Mike Morath.

== Athletics ==
The Morgan Eagles compete in the following sports:

- Volleyball
- Basketball
- Cross Country
- 6-Man Football
- Golf
- Tennis
- Track and Field
