= Lakeside Village, Texas =

- Unincorporated community
- Location within Texas Location within the United States
- Coordinates: 32°01′15″N 97°29′38″W
- Country: United States
- State: Texas
- County: Bosque
- Elevation: 617 ft (188 m)
- Time zone: UTC-6 (Central (CST))
  - Summer (DST): UTC-5 (CDT)
- Area code: 254
- GNIS feature ID: 1339541

Lakeside Village is an unincorporated community in Bosque County, in the U.S. state of Texas. According to the Handbook of Texas, the community had a population of 226 in 2000.

== Geography ==
Lakeside Village is located at the intersection of Farm to Market Roads 56 and 927 on Lake Whitney, 15 mi (24 km) northeast of Meridian and 50 mi (80 km) south of Fort Worth in northeastern Bosque County. It is also located 28 mi (45 km) southeast of Glen Rose and 53 mi (85 km) west of Hillsboro.

== Education ==
Lakeside Village is served by the Kopperl Independent School District.
