= Walnut Springs High School =

Walnut Springs School

Location
- 184 Avenue A Walnut Springs, Bosque County, Texas 76690; United States; 32.052783°N 97.752453°W

Information
- School type: Public, high school
- Locale: Rural: Remote
- School district: Walnut Springs ISD
- NCES School ID: 484452012079
- Faculty: 18.53 (FTE)
- Grades: PreK‍–‍12
- Enrollment: 174 (2023‍–‍2024)
- Student to teacher ratio: 9.39
- Colors: Blue and white
- Team name: Hornets
- Website: Official website

Walnut Springs High School, also known as Walnut Springs School, is a public high school located in Walnut Springs, Texas. It is the sole high school in the Walnut Springs Independent School District and is classified as a 2A school by the University Interscholastic League. During 2022‍–‍2023, Walnut Springs School had an enrollment of 171 students and a student to teacher ratio of 9.60. The school received an overall rating of "F" from the Texas Education Agency for the 2024‍–‍2025 school year

== Athletics ==
The Walnut Springs Hornets compete in the following sports:

- Basketball
- Cross Country
- 6-Man Football
- Golf
- Tennis
- Track and Field
