= Womack, Texas =

- Unincorporated community
- Location within Texas Location within the United States
- Coordinates: 31°50′14″N 97°29′46″W
- Country: United States
- State: Texas
- County: Bosque
- Elevation: 837 ft (255 m)
- Time zone: UTC-6 (Central (CST))
  - Summer (DST): UTC-5 (CDT)
- Area code: 254
- GNIS feature ID: 1379290

Womack is an unincorporated community in Bosque County in Central Texas, United States. According to the Handbook of Texas, it had a population of 25 as of 2000.

== History ==
In 1852, James Pinckney Henderson came to own the land after he purchased it from James Smith. Most of the area's residents were German immigrants in its early years. Womack was granted a post office in 1880 inside Hugh S. Anderson's general store, only to close 26 years later. Church services were held in German. The population before World War II was estimated to be approximately 40 residents, of which it lost half by 1949. By 2000, Womack only had 25 people.

== Geography ==
Womack is on Farm to Market Road 219, 30 miles (48 km) northwest of Waco and 5 miles (8.0 km) northeast of Clifton in southeastern Bosque County.

== Education ==
In the 1920s, classes were conducted in German, with children also learning English. Today, Womack is served by the Clifton Independent School District.
