= Smith Bend, Texas =

Smith Bend, Texas (or Smiths Bend)
- Unincorporated community
- Location within Texas Location within the United States
- Coordinates: 31°49′49″N 97°18′16″W
- Country: United States
- State: Texas
- County: Bosque
- Elevation: 502 ft (153 m)
- Time zone: UTC-6 (Central (CST))
  - Summer (DST): UTC-5 (CDT)
- Area code: 254
- GNIS feature ID: 1368511

Smith Bend is an unincorporated community in Bosque County, in the U.S. state of Texas.

== Geography ==
Smith Bend is located inside of a meander of the Brazos River, a few miles south of Lake Whitney in southeastern Bosque County.

== Education ==
From the 1880s to the 1940s, Smith Bend had one school. Today, Smith Bend is served by the Clifton Independent School District.
