= Eulogy, Texas =

Unincorporated community in Texas, USA

- Unincorporated community
- Location within Texas Location within the United States
- Coordinates: 32°10′09″N 97°39′21″W
- Country: United States
- State: Texas
- County: Bosque
- Elevation: 771 ft (235 m)
- Time zone: UTC-6 (Central (CST))
  - Summer (DST): UTC-5 (CDT)
- Area code: 254
- GNIS feature ID: 2034692

Eulogy is an unincorporated community in Bosque County, in the U.S. state of Texas. According to the Handbook of Texas, the community had a population of 45 in 2000.

== Geography ==
Eulogy is located off Farm to Market Road 56, 9 mi (14 km) northeast of Walnut Springs and 50 mi (80 km) northwest of Waco in northern Bosque County.

== Education ==
The community continues to be served by Walnut Springs ISD today.

== Notable person ==
- Samuel Murray Robinson, United States Navy four-star admiral who served in World War II, was born in Eulogy.
