= Laguna Park, Texas =

Census-designated place in Bosque County, Texas, United States

Coordinates: 31°51′54″N 97°23′12″W

Laguna Park viewed from south side of State Highway 22,

Laguna Park is a census-designated place (CDP) in Bosque County in central Texas, United States. As of the 2020 census, Laguna Park had a population of 1,372.

== Description ==
Laguna Park is located along State Highway 22 in southeastern Bosque County, approximately 27 miles (43 km) northwest of Waco. The community is situated at the southern end of Lake Whitney, near the dam.

Following the completion of Whitney Dam in the early 1950s, Laguna Park became a recreation destination. Small stores and a post office opened to serve the surrounding agricultural area as well as visitors to Lake Whitney. The population stood at just under 500 during the mid-1970s, but slowly grew to approximately 550 by 2000.

Public education in the community of Laguna Park is provided by the Clifton Independent School District.

== Demographics ==
Historical population
Census	Pop.	Note	%±
2010	1,276		—
2020	1,372		7.5%
U.S. Decennial Census; 1850–1900 1910; 1920 1930 1940; 1950 1960 1970; 1980 1990 2000; 2010 2020

Laguna Park first appeared as a census designated place in the 2010 U.S. census.

Laguna Park CDP, Texas – Racial and ethnic composition Note: the US Census treats Hispanic/Latino as an ethnic category. This table excludes Latinos from the racial categories and assigns them to a separate category. Hispanics/Latinos may be of any race.
Race / Ethnicity (NH = Non-Hispanic)	Pop 2010	Pop 2020	% 2010	% 2020
White alone (NH)	1,198	1,164	93.89%	84.84%
Black or African American alone (NH)	5	14	0.39%	1.02%
Native American or Alaska Native alone (NH)	10	4	0.78%	0.29%
Asian alone (NH)	0	4	0.00%	0.29%
Pacific Islander alone (NH)	0	2	0.00%	0.15%
Other race alone (NH)	2	3	0.16%	0.22%
Mixed race or Multiracial (NH)	12	93	0.94%	6.78%
Hispanic or Latino (any race)	49	88	3.84%	6.41%
Total	1,276	1,372	100.00%	100.00%

== See also ==
- List of census-designated places in Texas
