= Ken Sanders (American football) =

American football player (born 1950)

No. 82, 89
- Position: Defensive end

Personal information
- Born: August 22, 1950 (age 76); Valley Mills, Texas, U.S.
- Listed height: 6 ft 5 in (1.96 m)
- Listed weight: 240 lb (109 kg)

Career information
- High school: Valley Mills
- College: Howard Payne
- NFL draft: 1972: 3rd round, 65th overall pick

Career history
- Detroit Lions (1972–1979); Minnesota Vikings (1980–1981)

Awards and highlights
- Second-team Little All-American (1971)

Career NFL statistics
- Sacks: 38.5
- Fumble recoveries: 4
- Stats at Pro Football Reference

Kenneth Sanders (born August 22, 1950) is an American former professional football player who was a defensive end in the National Football League (NFL). He played college football for the Howard Payne Yellow Jackets and was selected by the Detroit Lions in the third round of the 1972 NFL draft. He played in the NFL with the Lions from 1972 to 1979, and he played with the Minnesota Vikings from 1980 to 1981.
