= Cedar Shores, Texas =

- Unincorporated community
- Location within Texas Location within the United States
- Coordinates: 31°56′05″N 97°26′30″W
- Country: United States
- State: Texas
- County: Bosque
- Elevation: 581 ft (177 m)
- Time zone: UTC-6 (Central (CST))
  - Summer (DST): UTC-5 (CDT)
- Area code: 254
- GNIS feature ID: 2034665

Cedar Shores is an unincorporated community in Bosque County, in the U.S. state of Texas. According to the Handbook of Texas, the community had a population of 170 in 2000.

== History ==
Originally Cedar Shore Estates, the community was established in the 1960s as a series of lake houses. Its population was 150 in 1970 and 170 in 1980 and 2000. Its name was changed to Cedar Shores in 2000.

== Geography ==
Cedar Shores is located off Farm to Market Road 56, 10 mi (16 km) east of Meridian in eastern Bosque County.

== Education ==
Cedar Shores is served by the Morgan Independent School District.
