= Iredell =

Iredell may refer to:

Places

- Iredell County, North Carolina
- Iredell, Texas

People

- James Iredell (1751–1799), American Supreme Court Justice
- James Iredell Jr. 1788–1853), Governor of North Carolina
- James Iredell Waddell, Confederate-American commanding officer
