= Samuel Murray Robinson =

United States admiral (1882–1972)

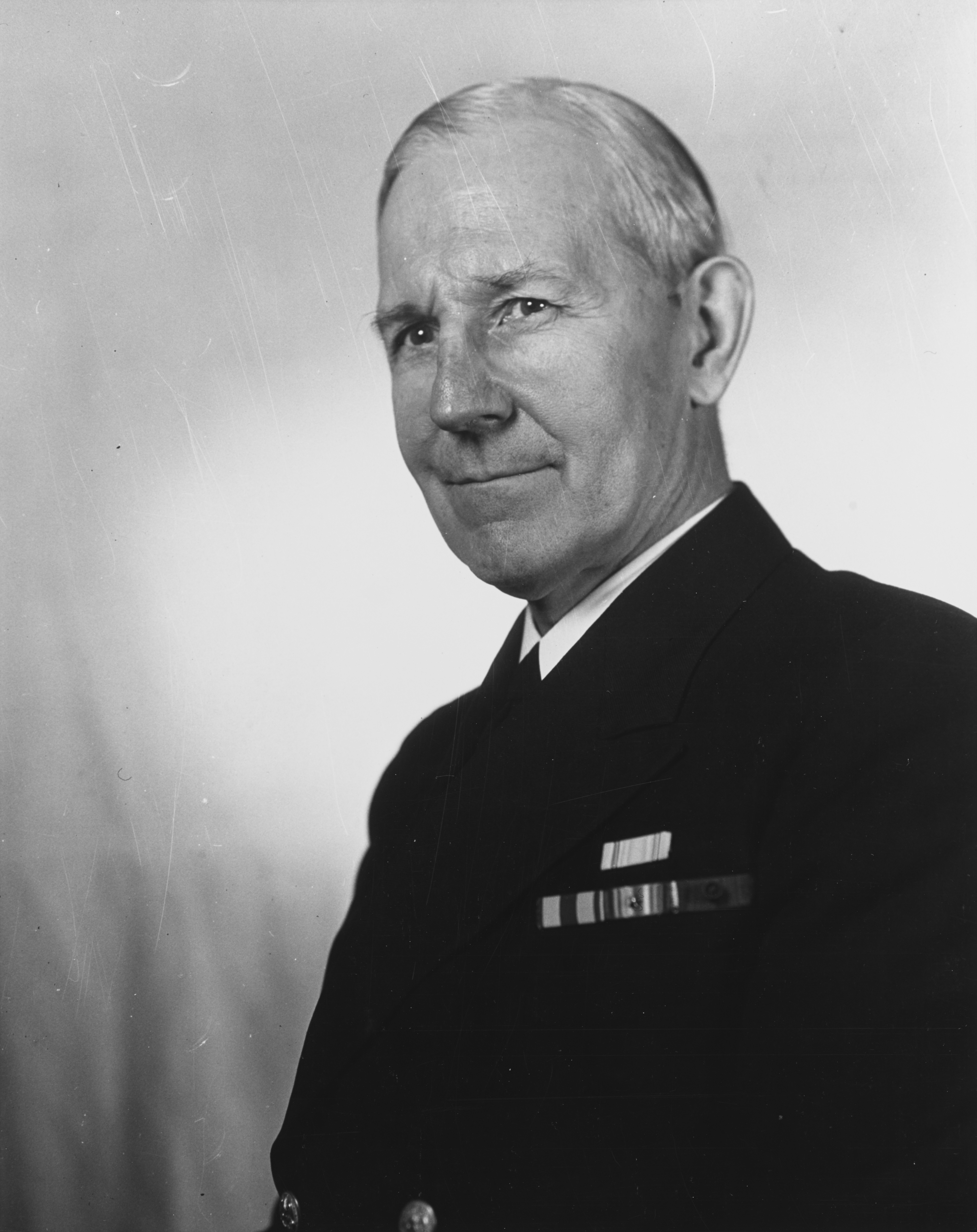
- Robinson in 1951
- Born: June 13, 1882; Eulogy, Texas, U.S.
- Died: November 11, 1972 (aged 90); Houston, Texas, U.S.
- Military career
- Allegiance: United States
- Branch: United States Navy
- Service years: 1903-1946
- Rank: Admiral
- Nickname: Hobby
- Conflicts: World War I World War II
- Awards: Distinguished Service Medal

Admiral Samuel Murray Robinson (August 13, 1882 – November 11, 1972) was a United States Navy four-star admiral who directed Navy procurement during World War II.

== Early career ==
Born in Eulogy, Texas, Robinson attended primary school in Walnut Springs, Texas, high school in Dublin, Texas, and college at Fort Worth University before entering the U.S. Naval Academy in 1899. Graduating in 1903, he saw service in the Asiatic Station before making a cruise from Honolulu, Hawaii to Panama aboard the Paul Jones, the first long voyage undertaken by a destroyer.

From 1907 to 1909, he circumnavigated the globe with the Great White Fleet aboard the battleship Vermont. During the round-the-world cruise, he met his future wife on a port call in San Francisco, California, and they were married on March 9, 1909, two weeks after Vermont returned with the fleet to Hampton Roads, Virginia. Later that year, the Navy established a formal graduate program at the Academy, and Robinson was one of 10 students selected for the first class of the School of Marine Engineering, alongside future four-star admiral James O. Richardson.

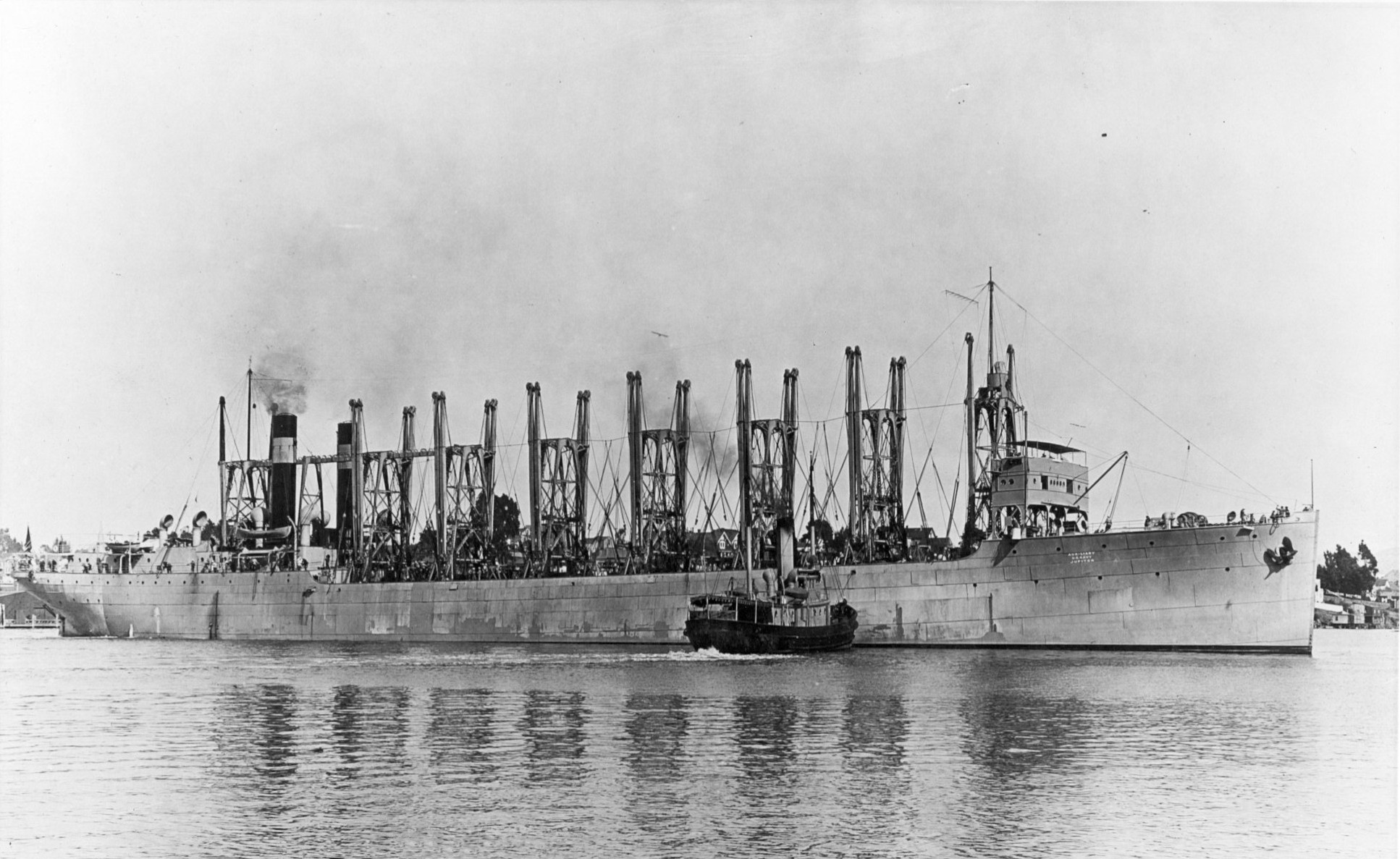
USS Jupiter (AC-3), on trials near Mare Island Navy Yard, October 16, 1913.

== Electric drive pioneer ==
Robinson was credited with pioneering electric drive propulsion in the U.S. Navy, beginning with his tour as executive officer and chief engineer of the newly built collier Jupiter. Jupiter was the first major ship equipped with turboelectric drive by the U.S. Navy, as part of a controlled experiment to evaluate the relative merits of competing propulsion mechanisms. Three new colliers of the same class were each equipped with a different propulsion type: Cyclops with reciprocating engines, Neptune with geared turbines, and Jupiter with a turboelectric drive supplied by the General Electric Company. The results of the collier trials would determine which mechanism would be selected to propel future battleships.

In August 1913, Jupiter's trials almost ended before they began. While underway off the coaling station in Tiburon, California in preparation for its shakedown cruise, Jupiter took evasive action to avoid an accidental collision with a passing submarine. During the sudden maneuver, a fuse on the main electrical panel blew, shutting down every piece of machinery on the ship, including its steering. With only four minutes before the ship would run aground, Robinson restored power; Jupiter got underway with 30 seconds to spare.

Robinson remained with Jupiter for its shakedown cruise, during which the collier traveled from the West Coast to the Atlantic and became the first naval vessel to transit the Panama Canal. At the end of Jupiter's trials, Robinson reported that turboelectric drive was lighter and more compact than the competing propulsion methods, and moreover was easily operated by relatively unskilled sailors, permitted accurate speed control, and exceeded General Electric's economy estimates by a remarkable 18 percent. Based on his report, turboelectric drive was selected for installation in the new battleship California, and Robinson was assigned to superintend the construction of California's electric equipment at the Mare Island Navy Yard.

He was assigned to the Bureau of Engineering from 1914 to 1919, where he helped design five battleships in rapid succession. In spring 1917, he sailed by convoy to Britain to study technical developments of the Royal Navy and spent time as an observer with the British Grand Fleet. From 1919 to 1921 he had sea duty as fleet engineering officer to the commander in chief of the Pacific Fleet. He returned to the Bureau of Engineering in 1921 to begin six years as officer in charge of the Design Division. He became manager of the Puget Sound Navy Yard in Washington in 1927.

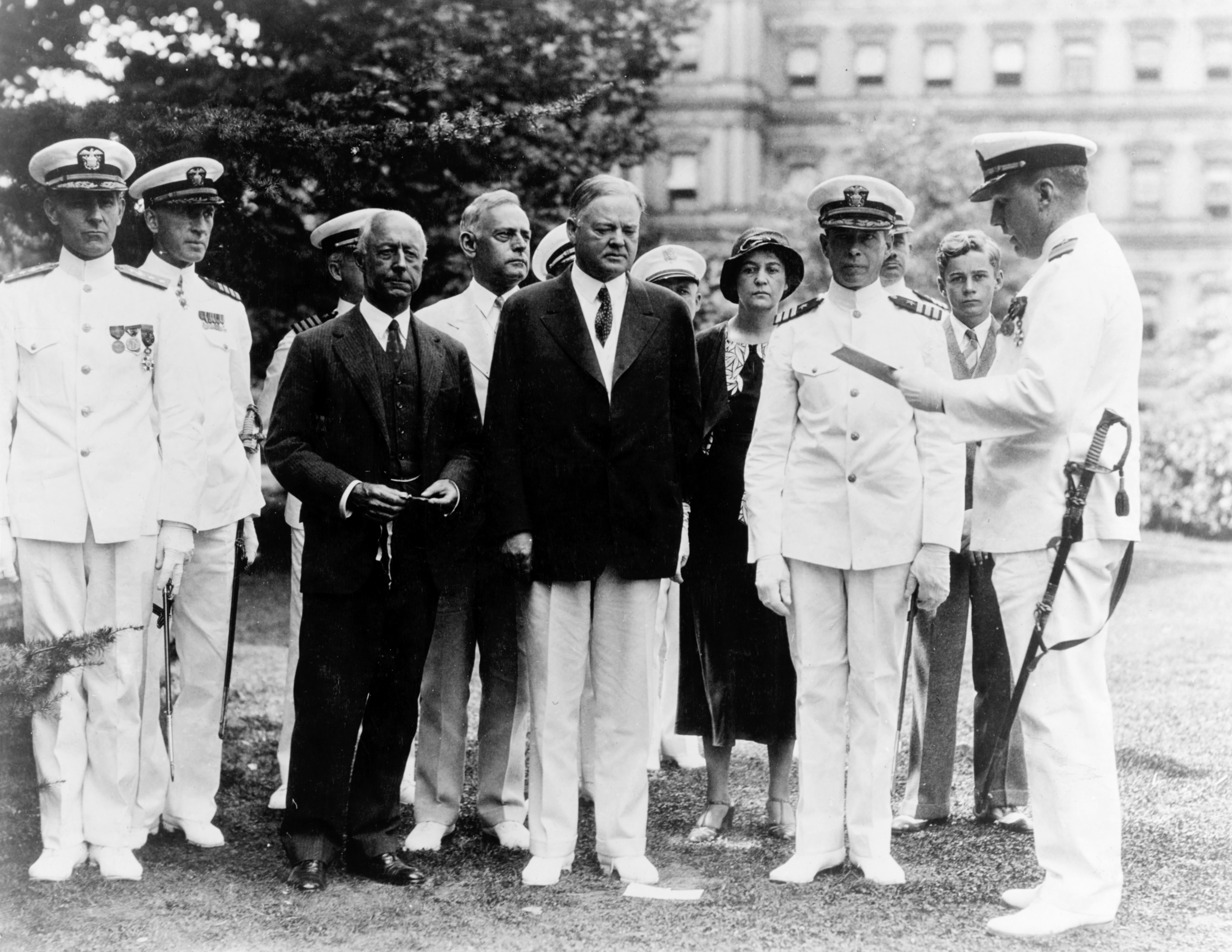
As chief of Bureau of Engineering (far left), attending Medal of Honor ceremony for Cdr. Claud A. Jones, August 1, 1932.

== Chief of BuEng ==
In 1931, Robinson was commissioned chief of the Bureau of Engineering (BuEng) with the rank of rear admiral, succeeding Rear Admiral Harry E. Yarnell. During this first of two nonconsecutive terms as the chief Navy engineer, Robinson helped stimulate the development of submarine electric propulsion. At the time, lightweight, high-speed engines were still in the experimental phase and no existing engine was suitable for submarine electric drive. Procuring such an engine was a venture requiring a level of risk and capital investment that was considered prohibitive for a private company. Rather than wait for the private sector to catch up to the Navy's requirements, Robinson launched an innovative bureau-sponsored competition that successfully drew private diesel contractors into the submarine propulsion market.

He was relieved as chief of BuEng on May 29, 1935 by Rear Admiral Harold G. Bowen, Sr. and became inspector of naval materiel at the General Electric Company in Schenectady, New York. He was senior member of the Navy Compensation Board in 1938. In September 1939 he was appointed for a second term as chief of BuEng and put in charge of the shipbuilding program as coordinator of shipbuilding.

== Chief of BuShips ==
In 1940, Robinson became the first chief of the Bureau of Ships (BuShips), a new division formed by consolidating the Bureau of Engineering with the Bureau of Construction and Repair following a series of mis-coordinations between the two bureaus. The merger was the brainchild of Secretary of the Navy Charles Edison, who wanted centralized control of shipbuilding but had failed in a previous effort to create a chief of shore operations, which the sea-going admirals had resisted as placing excessive responsibility and power in the hands of a mere technical officer.

In the Bureau of Ships, Robinson generated designs for the ship types ordered by the Chief of Naval Operations. According to Robinson, picking a ship design was like buying a hat: for every new class of ship, the Bureau drafted up to ten different designs, unofficially nicknamed "spring styles". After six or eight months of drafting work, these tentative blueprints were submitted for consideration by the General Board of the Navy, which then informed the Bureau which choice it preferred.

As coordinator of shipbuilding, Robinson laid the groundwork for the dramatic expansion of the fleet under the two-ocean Navy program. Under Robinson, the time between contract plans and working plans was cut from between 15 and 18 months to less than a year, an efficiency achieved in part by Robinson's decision to freeze the designs of combat ships in each category in order to stop the endless engineering delays incurred by frequent design changes. He mustered legislative support by testifying some 50 times before Congressional committees to explain the Navy's materiel requirements, and mobilized industry resources by exhaustively surveying and reserving the nation's shipbuilding facilities. Thanks in large part to Robinson's careful preparation, when Congress appropriated the funds to expand the fleet by 70% in September 1940, the Navy awarded almost every contract within an hour after President Franklin D. Roosevelt signed the bill.

By March 1942, the completion date for the two-ocean Navy program, originally projected for 1947, had already been pushed forward to 1945-46. Every major shipyard in the United States was either building or repairing some kind of Navy vessel. Many vessels would be completed more than a year ahead of the schedules specified by their original contracts, including aircraft carriers, cruisers, destroyers, and other light warships. By the end of Robinson's tenure, the Bureau of Ships was churning out ships faster than the other bureaus could outfit them with instrumentation and other essentials.

== World War II ==
Upon America's entry into World War II, Robinson was elevated to production chief for the entire Navy. As director of the newly created Office of Procurement and Material in the Navy Department, Robinson was in charge of all naval material procurement activities, including the construction of ships, aircraft, and shore bases; the manufacture of guns and ordnance; and the purchase of oil, food, clothing, and other supplies. He was promoted to vice admiral on January 31, 1942, the highest rank ever attained by an American staff officer up to that point.

In his new role, Robinson exercised unprecedented control over the Navy Department bureau system. For over eighty years, the various bureaus - Ordnance, Supplies and Accounts, Medicine and Surgery, etc. - had functioned more or less autonomously, and the decentralized bureau system had acquired a reputation for parochialism and inefficiency. Bureau chiefs reigned supreme within their own domains, reporting only to the secretary or undersecretary of the Navy, and jealously guarded their statutory prerogatives against repeated attempts to consolidate uniformed authority in the person of the chief of naval operations. Following the Japanese attack on Pearl Harbor, the two-ocean Navy, by now scheduled to arrive in 1944, suddenly was needed immediately. To maximize construction speed, Secretary of the Navy Frank Knox created a new Office of Procurement and Material and placed Robinson at its head. The new office worked through the existing bureaus to coordinate all Navy procurement, giving Robinson supervisory authority over all the bureau chiefs, a change in Navy Department governance as sudden and sweeping as the simultaneous consolidation of line authority in the hands of the commander in chief of the United States Fleet, Admiral Ernest J. King.

As Navy production chief, Robinson formed one leg of a Navy high command triumvirate whose other members were King, as chief of naval operations and commander in chief of the United States Fleet; and Vice Admiral Frederick J. Horne, as vice chief of naval operations. Robinson delivered naval hardware and supplies to Horne, who combined Robinson's materiel with the manpower trained by the Bureau of Personnel and passed the battle-ready products to King, who deployed them. Robinson and his Army counterpart, Lieutenant General Brehon B. Somervell, reported directly to the chairman of the War Production Board, Donald M. Nelson, who delegated them responsibility for all military procurement in the United States.

Robinson was promoted to full admiral on August 27, 1945, twelve days after the victory over Japan. He retired from the Navy in 1946 to serve as administrator of the Webb Institute of Naval Architecture in Glen Cove, New York until 1952.

== Personal life ==
He married the former Emma Mary Burnham on March 2, 1909, and they had two sons: James Burnham Robinson, a naval reservist in the Civil Engineer Corps who was captured at Wake Island in December 1941 and interned as a prisoner of war in Shanghai; and Murray Robinson, a patent attorney in Old Greenwich, Connecticut. He died of pneumonia in Houston, Texas in 1972.

His written work includes several technical articles on turboelectric drive; the 1922 textbook Electric Ship Propulsion; and A Brief History of the Texas Navy, an appraisal of the strategic value of the Texas Navy that was published by the Sons of the Republic of Texas in 1961 and mailed to every senior and junior high school in Texas, and to all universities and colleges, as a supplemental chapter in the teaching of Texas history. He recorded an oral history that is archived at the Columbia University Oral History Research Office.

He was presented the John Scott Award in 1942 for outstanding work in warship design and construction. The Society of Naval Architects and Marine Engineers awarded him the 1942 David W. Taylor Medal for notable achievement in naval architecture. He was made a Knight Commander of the Order of the British Empire in 1948 for his work in outfitting American-built ships for the Royal Navy, and for cooperating in other procurement matters.
