= Valley Mills High School =

Location
- 1 Eagle Way; Valley Mills, Texas 76689-0518; United States; 31.661144°N 97.476471°W

Information
- School type: Public high school
- School district: Valley Mills Independent School District
- Principal: Jason Sansom
- Teaching staff: 21.50 (FTE)
- Grades: 9-12
- Enrollment: 206 (2023–2024)
- Student to teacher ratio: 9.58
- Colors: Green and gold
- Athletics conference: UIL Class AA
- Mascot: Eagle
- Website: Valley Mills High School

Valley Mills High School is a public high school located in Valley Mills, Texas and classified as a 2A school by the UIL. It is part of the Valley Mills Independent School District. In 2015, the school was rated "Met Standard" by the Texas Education Agency.

== Athletics ==
The Valley Mills Eagles compete in these sports -

- Baseball
- Basketball
- Cross Country
- Football
- Golf
- Tennis
- Track and Field
- Powerlifting
- Softball
- Volleyball

=== State Titles ===
- Baseball -
  - 1983(1A), 1991(1A), 1992(1A), 2022(2A)

== Clubs and groups ==
The school has many known clubs: Valley Mills Eagle Pride Band, FFA, Fellowship of Christian Athletes, FCCLA, Yearbook, Leo and also a Spanish Club. They also have a football team and girls basketball and softball teams.

The Valley Mills High School Band went to state for the first time in 2017, after coming in first at the Area competition. Once there, they finished second overall in the state of Texas for 2A bands. They returned to state the following year, following another first-place victory at Area, and finished their season as the Texas UIL Class 2A State Marching Champions.

== Notable alumni ==
- Donnie Sadler - former MLB utility player
- Ken Sanders - former NFL defensive end
