= Isaac Brock (longevity claimant) =

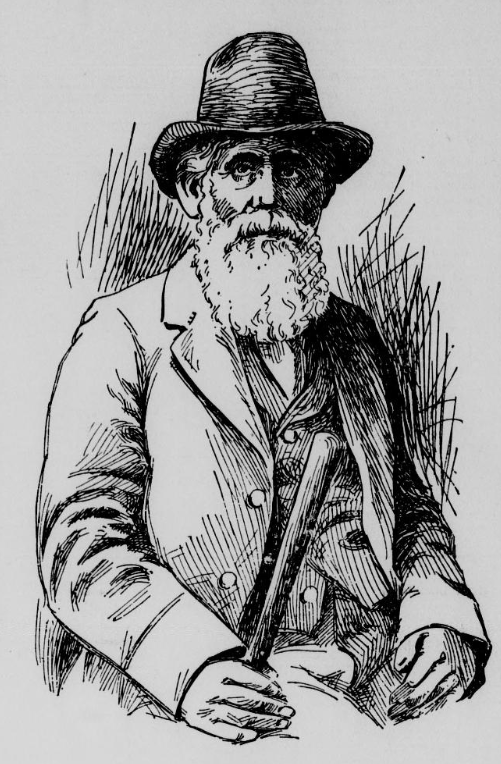
- Sketch of Brock in 1898 newspaper
- Born: Buncombe County, North Carolina, United States
- Died: September 3, 1909; McLennan County, Texas

Isaac Brock (died September 3, 1909) was an alleged supercentenarian, the subject of news coverage in the United States in the late 19th and early 20th century due to his claims of longevity. According to varying claims, and his gravestone, he was born on March 1, 1787, which would have made him 122 years and 164 days at the time of his death.

Brock claimed to have been born on March 1, 1788 (or 1787) in Buncombe County, North Carolina, and fought in the War of 1812 before moving to Georgia. Brock eventually moved to Texas, heading up an armory for the South in the American Civil War. He ended up in Valley Mills in McLennan County.

In his last years, advertisements featured Brock as crediting the patent medicine of Peruna for his longevity.

His age at the time of his death was in some dispute, as his obituary in the Waco Semi-Weekly Tribune said: "How old was he. We do not know and we doubt if any one knew with exactness."

Despite the claims of very advanced age, occasionally celebrated in modern press coverage in Texas, Brock was more likely born around 1805. U.S. census reports from 1880 and 1860 put his birth around 1805 or 1812 respectively.
