= Clara McDonald Williamson =

American painter

- Born: Clara McDonald; November 20, 1875; Iredell, Texas
- Died: February 17, 1976 (aged 100)
- Style: Naïve art
- Spouse: John Williamson
- Children: 1 child; 2 stepchildren

Clara McDonald Williamson (November 20, 1875 – February 17, 1976) was a 20th century American painter who worked in the tradition of naïve art. Her subjects were genre scenes of life in the American West, especially her home state of Texas. Like Grandma Moses, she started painting late in life and she achieved a national reputation despite the fact that her career lasted only two decades.

== Biography ==
McDonald was born November 20, 1875, in Iredell, Texas, the second of six children of Mary Lasswell McDonald and Thomas McDonald. She had only intermittent formal education and little art training. At the age of 20, she went to work in a county clerk's office but lost this job seven years later. She went back to Iredell, where she married John Williamson, a widower with two children. They had one son together. In 1920, they moved to Dallas, where they ran a boarding house and a store. John Williamson died in 1943, at which point his widow, then well into her sixties, took up painting. She has long been interested in it, but her husband believed it was pointless.

== Art ==
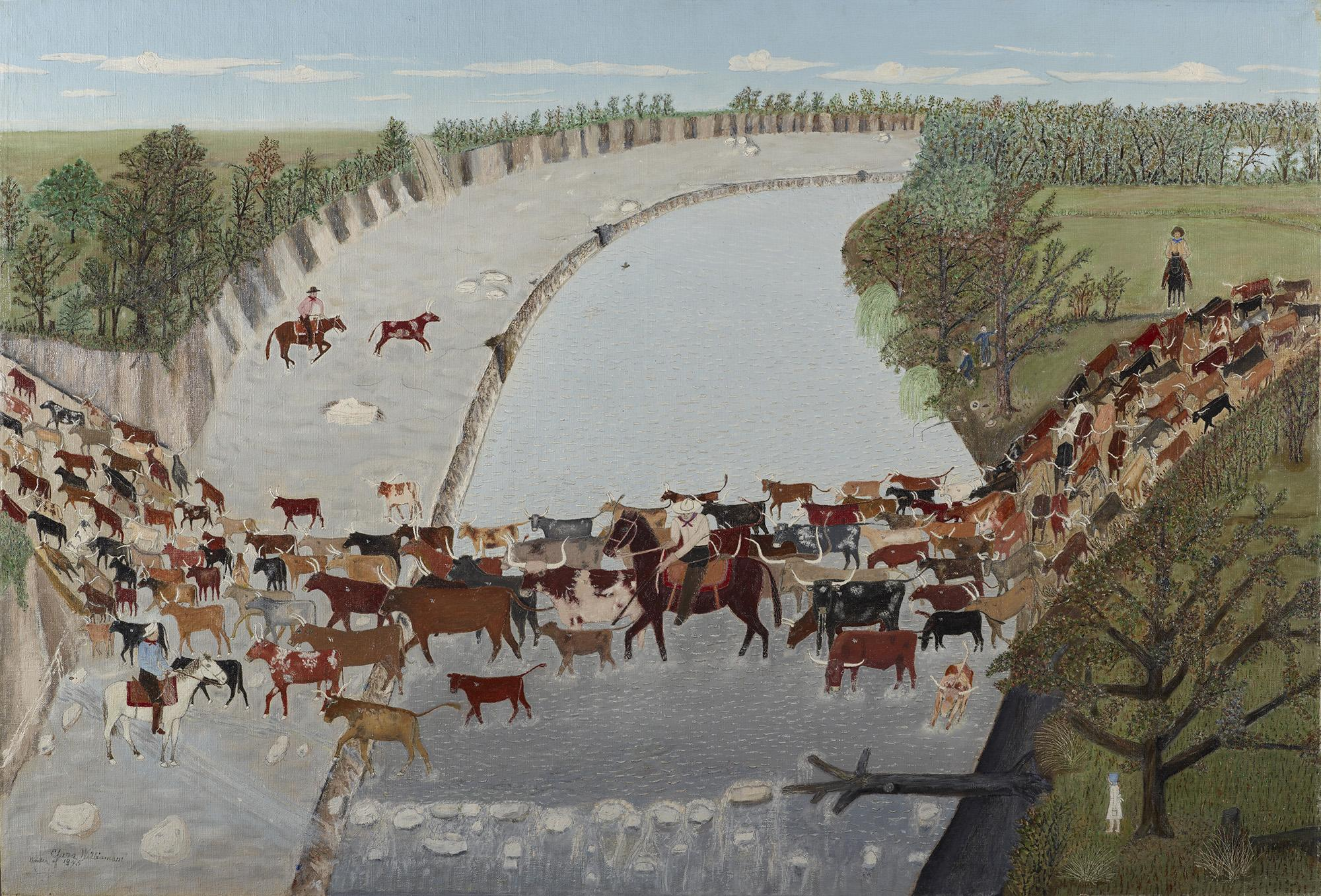
Git 'Long Little Dogies by Clara Mcdonald Williamson, 1945

Starting in 1943, Williamson took several classes in drawing and painting at Southern Methodist University and the Dallas Museum School. She quickly began working on what she called "memory paintings" that referred to incidents from her early rural life; these became a dominant theme in her oeuvre. Often the underlying story or event figures in the title. Examples include Chicken for Dinner (1945), The Girls Went Fishing (1945–46), Standing in the Need of Prayer (1947, showing a revival meeting by torchlight), Texas Barn Dance (1951), The Day the Bosque Froze Over (1953), and The Night Before Christmas (1954). She also made paintings whose subjects were more generic to the western United States, such as two paintings about cattle drives—Git 'Long Little Dogies (1945) and Old Chisholm Trail (1952)—and a painting about the coming of the railroad, The Building of the Railroad (1949–50). The cattle-drive paintings are unusual as a pair since Williamson hardly ever painted the same subject more than once.

With their genre subjects, eccentric perspective, flat paint handling, and simplified and stylized forms, Williamson's paintings are typical of American naïve art. Her palette was restrained, leaning towards desaturated greens, browns, and grays in middle and light tones that lent a luminous subtlety to the finished works. She made a few charcoal sketches and watercolors but worked mostly in oil on canvas. She had an unusual method of painting her canvases from top to bottom, which she explained as a way to keep paint off of herself.

Williamson—who became known as "Aunt Clara" within the art world—sold her first work within a short time of beginning to paint; it was bought by Jerry Bywaters, who at the time was the director of the Dallas Museum of Fine Arts. Through the dealer Donald Vogel, who promoted her work and later wrote a book about her, she began entering her work in art competitions and in 1946 won the Dealey Purchase Award at the Dallas Allied Arts Exhibit. Two years later, she had a solo exhibition at the Dallas Museum of Fine Arts, following which she began to establish a national reputation. Her work was included in the 1950 exhibition "American Painting Today" at the Metropolitan Museum of Art in New York, as well as in several traveling exhibitions organized by the Smithsonian Institution. In the 1960s, the Amon Carter Museum organized a traveling retrospective of her work. In 1969, a documentary on Williamson was shown on national television. Williamson's success came despite her lack of interest in a career; she said once that she held back from the art world to some extent out of fear that "they'd tell me what to paint, how to paint it, and when to paint."

Williamson moved into a nursing home in 1966, where she completed the last of her more than 100 paintings. She died on February 17, 1976, aged 100. Her work is held in the collections of the Museum of Modern Art (New York), the Dallas Museum of Art, the Amon Carter Museum, and several other art museums and institutions.
