= Iredell Independent School District =

School district in Texas

Coordinates: 31.9830°N 97.8755°W

Iredell Independent School District is a public school district based in Iredell, Texas (USA).

Located in western Bosque County, the district extends into a small portion of Erath County.

The district has one school that serves students in grades pre-kindergarten through twelve.

== Academic achievement ==
In 2015, the school was rated "Met Standard" by the Texas Education Agency.

== Special programs ==
=== Athletics ===
Iredell High School plays six-man football.

== See also ==
- List of school districts in Texas
- List of high schools in Texas
