= Walnut Springs Independent School District =

School district in Texas

Location
- Walnut Springs, Bosque County, Texas, 76690; United States
- Coordinates: 32°3′7.16″N 97°45′11.19″W

District information
- Grades: PK-12
- Superintendent: Pat Garrett
- Governing agency: Texas Education Agency
- Schools: 1
- Budget: $1.79 million (2015-2016)
- NCES District ID: 4844520

Students and staff
- Students: 177 (2017-2018)
- Teachers: 19.62 (2017-2018)
- Staff: 32.13 (2017-2018)

Other information
- Website: www.walnutspringsisd.net

Walnut Springs Independent School District is a public school district based in Walnut Springs, Texas, United States. Located in Bosque County, the district extends into a small portion of Somervell County. Walnut Springs ISD has one school that serves students in prekindergarten through grade 12.

== Academic achievement ==
In 2015, the school was rated "met standard" by the Texas Education Agency.

== Special programs ==
=== Athletics ===
Walnut Springs High School plays six-man football.

The district has a boys' basketball team and a girls' basketball team.

The district also has a golf team and a track and field team.

== See also ==
- List of school districts in Texas
