= Donnie Sadler =

American baseball player (born 1975)

- Utility player
- Born: June 17, 1975 (age 51); Valley Mills, Texas, U.S.
- Batted: Right Threw: Right

MLB debut
- April 1, 1998, for the Boston Red Sox

Last MLB appearance
- May 12, 2007, for the Arizona Diamondbacks

MLB statistics
- Batting average: .202
- Home runs: 6
- Runs batted in: 46
- Stats at Baseball Reference

Teams
- Boston Red Sox (1998–2000); Cincinnati Reds (2001); Kansas City Royals (2001–2002); Texas Rangers (2002–2003); Arizona Diamondbacks (2004, 2007)

Donnie Lamont Sadler (born June 17, 1975) is an American former professional baseball utility player. He played in Major League Baseball (MLB) from 1998 to 2007.

== Career ==
An alumnus of Valley Mills High School in Valley Mills, Texas (where he was an all-state shortstop), Sadler is small in stature, standing at 5'6" tall and weighing 175 pounds. His cousin, Ray Sadler, was an outfielder in the Tampa Bay Rays organization.

Drafted 229th overall by the Boston Red Sox in 1994, Sadler quickly displayed impressive speed in the minor leagues. From 1994 to 1996, for example, he averaged nearly 36 steals per season, while playing in an average of only 95 games each year. He earned a spot on the Midwest League All-Star team in 1995 because he not only stole 41 bases, he batted a respectable .283 with nine home runs and 55 RBI.

Sadler made his major league debut at the age of 23 in the second game of the 1998 season, April 1. Although Sadler's Red Sox beat the Oakland Athletics 2-0 that game, he went 0 for 3 at the plate.

After starting the season without collecting a single hit in his first 11 at bats, he was quickly sent down and did not see any major league action until July of that year. The first hit of his career was quite impressive-it came in his second game after being recalled from Pawtucket in July-off of pitcher Jason Bere on July 3, he smacked a triple in the sixth inning. He finished the game one for five and scored one run as the Red Sox beat the Chicago White Sox 15 to 2.

For the rest of his career, he went up and down between the minors and majors, spending only one season in the majors for the entire year: 2001.

Sadler was involved in a couple of noteworthy transactions in his career. The first occurred on November 16, 2000, when he and Michael Coleman were sent to the Cincinnati Reds for Chris Stynes. The second came on June 20, 2001, when the Reds traded Sadler to the Kansas City Royals for minor league pitcher Cary Ammons.

Sadler finished with a career batting average of .202, and he did not show the speed he displayed in the minors-the highest total of stolen bases he had in a season was seven. Of the six home runs he hit in his career, three of them came in the first 124 at bats of his career. He hit only three more in 643 at bats.

His postseason batting average was .500-he has collected one hit (a double) in two at bats.

On July 28, 2007, it was announced that Sadler had tested positive for a drug of abuse and was handed a 50-game suspension.

Sadler later served as a hitting coach for the Philadelphia Phillies organization.

== Career stats ==
Year	Age	Team	Lg	G	AB	R	H	2B	3B	HR	RBI	SB	SO	BA	OBP	SLG	OPS
1998	23	Boston Red Sox	AL	58	124	21	28	4	4	3	15	4	28	.226	.276	.395	.671
1999	24	Boston Red Sox	AL	49	107	18	30	5	1	0	4	2	20	.280	.313	.346	.658
2000	25	Boston Red Sox	AL	49	99	14	22	5	0	1	10	3	18	.222	.262	.303	.565
2001	26	Cincinnati Reds/Kansas City Royals	MLB	93	185	28	30	6	0	1	5	7	37	.162	.243	.211	.454
2002	27	Kansas City Royals/Texas Rangers	AL	73	98	16	16	2	1	0	7	5	19	.163	.231	.204	.436
2003	28	Texas Rangers	AL	77	131	27	26	5	2	1	5	4	34	.198	.277	.290	.567
2004	29	Arizona Diamondbacks	NL	18	23	1	3	2	0	0	0	0	7	.130	.167	.217	.384
2007	32	Arizona Diamondbacks	NL	1	1	0	0	0	0	0	0	0	0	.000	.000	.000	.000
