= Kopperl, Texas =

Kopperl
- Unincorporated community Census-designated place
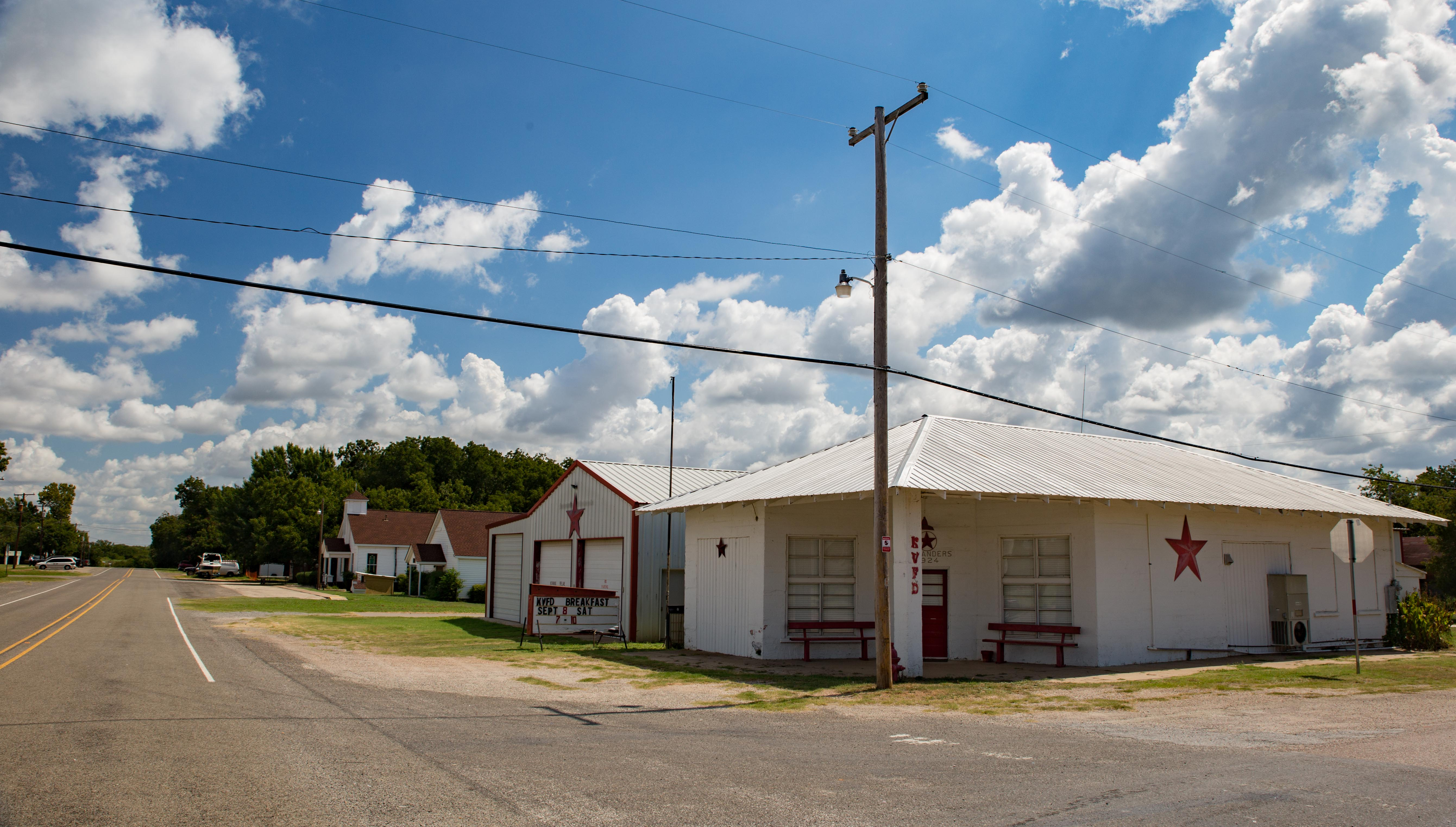

- Location within the state of Texas Kopperl (the United States)
- Coordinates: 32°04′12″N 97°30′04″W
- Country: United States
- State: Texas
- County: Bosque
- Elevation: 568 ft (173 m)

Population (2008 est.)
  - Total: 225
- Time zone: UTC-6 (Central (CST))
  - Summer (DST): UTC-5 (CDT)
- ZIP codes: 76652
- Area code: 254
- GNIS feature ID: 2805736

Kopperl (pronounced KOP-er-ul) is an unincorporated community and census-designated place (CDP) in Bosque County, Texas, United States. It lies on the northwestern end of Lake Whitney, and had a population of 164 as of the 2020 census.

== History ==
Kopperl was founded in 1881. Named after Galveston banker and railroad tycoon Moritz Kopperl, the town was established as a regional shipping point along the Gulf, Colorado and Santa Fe Railway. It is said that the population peaked at 329 in 1904 before declining to 225 by the 1970s, a figure it has maintained fairly consistently since. However, four years later, Washington reported in September 1908 that the population was 500, with 115 families.

Shortly after midnight on June 15, 1960, a very rare meteorological phenomenon, a heat burst, struck the community when a dying thunderstorm collapsed over Kopperl. The storm had rained itself out, and with little to no precipitation to cool the resulting downdrafts, superheated air descended upon the community in the form of extremely hot, hurricane-force wind gusts of up to 75 mph (121 km/h). The temperature increased rapidly, reportedly peaking near 140 °F (60 °C), 20° above the official all-time high for the state of Texas and exceeding the highest official temperature recorded on Earth. The storm, known as "Satan's Storm" by locals, soon became part of local folklore.

Kopperl was the town described in "Texas Trilogy", a song by Texas native Steve Fromholz and covered by Lyle Lovett.

== Demographics ==
Historical population
Census	Pop.	Note	%±
2020	164		—
U.S. Decennial Census; 1850–1900 1910; 1920 1930 1940; 1950 1960 1970; 1980 1990 2000; 2010 2020

Kopperl first appeared as a census-designated place in the 2020 U.S. census.

=== 2020 census ===
Kopperl CDP, Texas – Racial and ethnic composition Note: the US Census treats Hispanic/Latino as an ethnic category. This table excludes Latinos from the racial categories and assigns them to a separate category. Hispanics/Latinos may be of any race.
Race / Ethnicity (NH = Non-Hispanic)	Pop 2020	% 2020
White alone (NH)	153	93.29%
Black or African American alone (NH)	0	0.00%
Native American or Alaska Native alone (NH)	0	0.00%
Asian alone (NH)	0	0.00%
Pacific Islander alone (NH)	0	0.00%
Other race alone (NH)	0	0.00%
Mixed race or Multiracial (NH)	5	3.05%
Hispanic or Latino (any race)	6	3.66%
Total	164	100.00%

== Education ==
Kopperl is served by the Kopperl Independent School District.

== Climate ==
The climate in this area is characterized by hot, humid summers and generally mild to cool winters. According to the Köppen climate classification, Kopperl has a humid subtropical climate, Cfa on climate maps.

Climate data for Kopperl, U.S.A. (1908-present)
Month	Jan	Feb	Mar	Apr	May	Jun	Jul	Aug	Sep	Oct	Nov	Dec	Year
Record high °F (°C)	90 (32)	97 (36)	100 (38)	103 (39)	107 (42)	140 (60)	111 (44)	112 (44)	114 (46)	101 (38)	93 (34)	91 (33)	140 (60)
Mean daily maximum °F (°C)	57.5 (14.2)	61.3 (16.3)	68.5 (20.3)	77.3 (25.2)	83.9 (28.8)	90.9 (32.7)	95.7 (35.4)	96.4 (35.8)	89.0 (31.7)	79.0 (26.1)	68.1 (20.1)	58.5 (14.7)	77.2 (25.1)
Daily mean °F (°C)	45.1 (7.3)	48.8 (9.3)	55.9 (13.3)	64.8 (18.2)	72.7 (22.6)	80.0 (26.7)	83.7 (28.7)	84.0 (28.9)	76.9 (24.9)	66.5 (19.2)	55.8 (13.2)	46.3 (7.9)	64.9 (18.3)
Mean daily minimum °F (°C)	32.6 (0.3)	36.2 (2.3)	43.3 (6.3)	52.2 (11.2)	61.6 (16.4)	69.1 (20.6)	71.7 (22.1)	71.7 (22.1)	64.8 (18.2)	54.1 (12.3)	43.5 (6.4)	34.1 (1.2)	52.9 (11.6)
Record low °F (°C)	−3 (−19)	−3 (−19)	11 (−12)	18 (−8)	35 (2)	38 (3)	56 (13)	51 (11)	30 (−1)	20 (−7)	15 (−9)	−3 (−19)	−3 (−19)
Average precipitation inches (mm)	2.08 (53)	2.67 (68)	3.17 (81)	2.72 (69)	4.32 (110)	4.42 (112)	2.00 (51)	2.26 (57)	3.30 (84)	3.62 (92)	2.61 (66)	2.53 (64)	35.7 (907)
Average snowfall inches (cm)	0.2 (0.51)	0.1 (0.25)	0.0 (0.0)	0.0 (0.0)	0.0 (0.0)	0.0 (0.0)	0.0 (0.0)	0.0 (0.0)	0.0 (0.0)	0.0 (0.0)	0.0 (0.0)	0.1 (0.25)	0.4 (1.01)
Source 1:
Source 2: June record high
