= Morgan, Texas =

- City
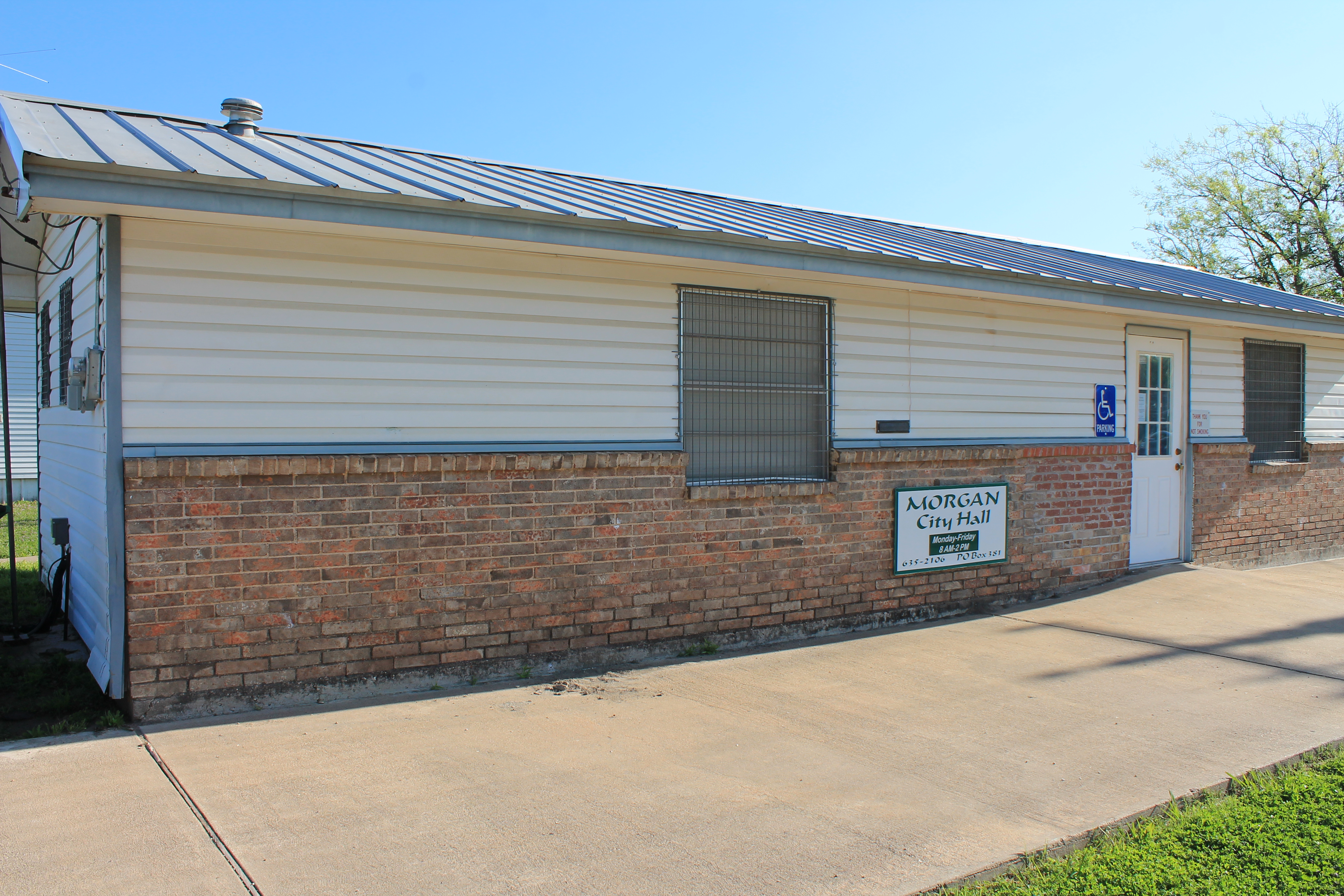
- City hall

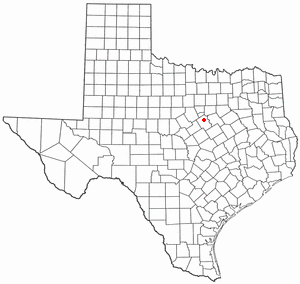
- Location of Morgan, Texas

- Coordinates: 32°1′1″N 97°36′25″W
- Country: United States
- State: Texas
- County: Bosque

Area
  - Total: 0.75 sq mi (1.93 km^{2})
  - Land: 0.74 sq mi (1.92 km^{2})
  - Water: 0.0039 sq mi (0.01 km^{2})
- Elevation: 735 ft (224 m)

Population (2020)
  - Total: 454
  - Density: 612/sq mi (236/km^{2})
- Time zone: UTC-6 (Central (CST))
  - Summer (DST): UTC-5 (CDT)
- ZIP code: 76671
- Area code: 254
- FIPS code: 48-49356
- GNIS feature ID: 2411160

Morgan is a city in Bosque County in Central Texas, United States. The city's population was 454 at the 2020 census.

== Geography ==
According to the United States Census Bureau, the city has a total area of 0.8 square miles (2.1 km^{2}), all land.

=== Climate ===
The climate in this area is characterized by hot, humid summers and generally mild to cool winters. According to the Köppen climate classification, Morgan has a humid subtropical climate, Cfa on climate maps.

== Demographics ==
Historical population
Census	Pop.	Note	%±
1880	347		—
1890	426		22.8%
1900	766		79.8%
1910	831		8.5%
1920	672		−19.1%
1930	509		−24.3%
1940	503		−1.2%
1950	424		−15.7%
1960	381		−10.1%
1970	415		8.9%
1980	485		16.9%
1990	451		−7.0%
2000	485		7.5%
2010	490		1.0%
2020	454		−7.3%
U.S. Decennial Census; 2020 Census

=== 2020 census ===
As of the 2020 census, Morgan had a population of 454. The median age was 36.0 years. 27.1% of residents were under the age of 18 and 12.8% of residents were 65 years of age or older. For every 100 females there were 109.2 males, and for every 100 females age 18 and over there were 112.2 males age 18 and over.

0.0% of residents lived in urban areas, while 100.0% lived in rural areas.

There were 153 households in Morgan, of which 46.4% had children under the age of 18 living in them. Of all households, 56.2% were married-couple households, 21.6% were households with a male householder and no spouse or partner present, and 16.3% were households with a female householder and no spouse or partner present. About 18.9% of all households were made up of individuals and 6.5% had someone living alone who was 65 years of age or older.

There were 185 housing units, of which 17.3% were vacant. The homeowner vacancy rate was 1.8% and the rental vacancy rate was 15.8%.

Racial composition as of the 2020 census
Race	Number	Percent
White	257	56.6%
Black or African American	4	0.9%
American Indian and Alaska Native	6	1.3%
Asian	1	0.2%
Native Hawaiian and Other Pacific Islander	0	0.0%
Some other race	117	25.8%
Two or more races	69	15.2%
Hispanic or Latino (of any race)	247	54.4%

=== 2000 census ===
As of the 2000 census, there were 485 people, 164 households, and 122 families residing in the city. The population density was 649.3 inhabitants per square mile (250.7/km^{2}). There were 197 housing units at an average density of 263.8 per square mile (101.9/km^{2}). The racial makeup of the city was 75.26% White, 0.82% African American, 3.71% Native American, 16.70% from other races, and 3.51% from two or more races. Hispanic or Latino of any race were 35.26% of the population.

There were 164 households, out of which 39.0% had children under the age of 18 living with them, 56.7% were married couples living together, 12.2% had a female householder with no husband present, and 25.6% were non-families. 23.2% of all households were made up of individuals, and 13.4% had someone living alone who was 65 years of age or older. The average household size was 2.96 and the average family size was 3.49.

In the city, the population was spread out, with 34.4% under the age of 18, 6.8% from 18 to 24, 26.8% from 25 to 44, 19.8% from 45 to 64, and 12.2% who were 65 years of age or older. The median age was 32 years. For every 100 females, there were 109.1 males. For every 100 females age 18 and over, there were 98.8 males.

The median income for a household in the city was $22,188, and the median income for a family was $25,441. Males had a median income of $19,688 versus $20,500 for females. The per capita income for the city was $8,713. About 26.2% of families and 27.6% of the population were below the poverty line, including 32.4% of those under age 18 and 15.5% of those age 65 or over.

== Education ==
Morgan is served by the Morgan Independent School District.
