= Walnut Springs, Texas =

City in Bosque County, Texas, United States

- City
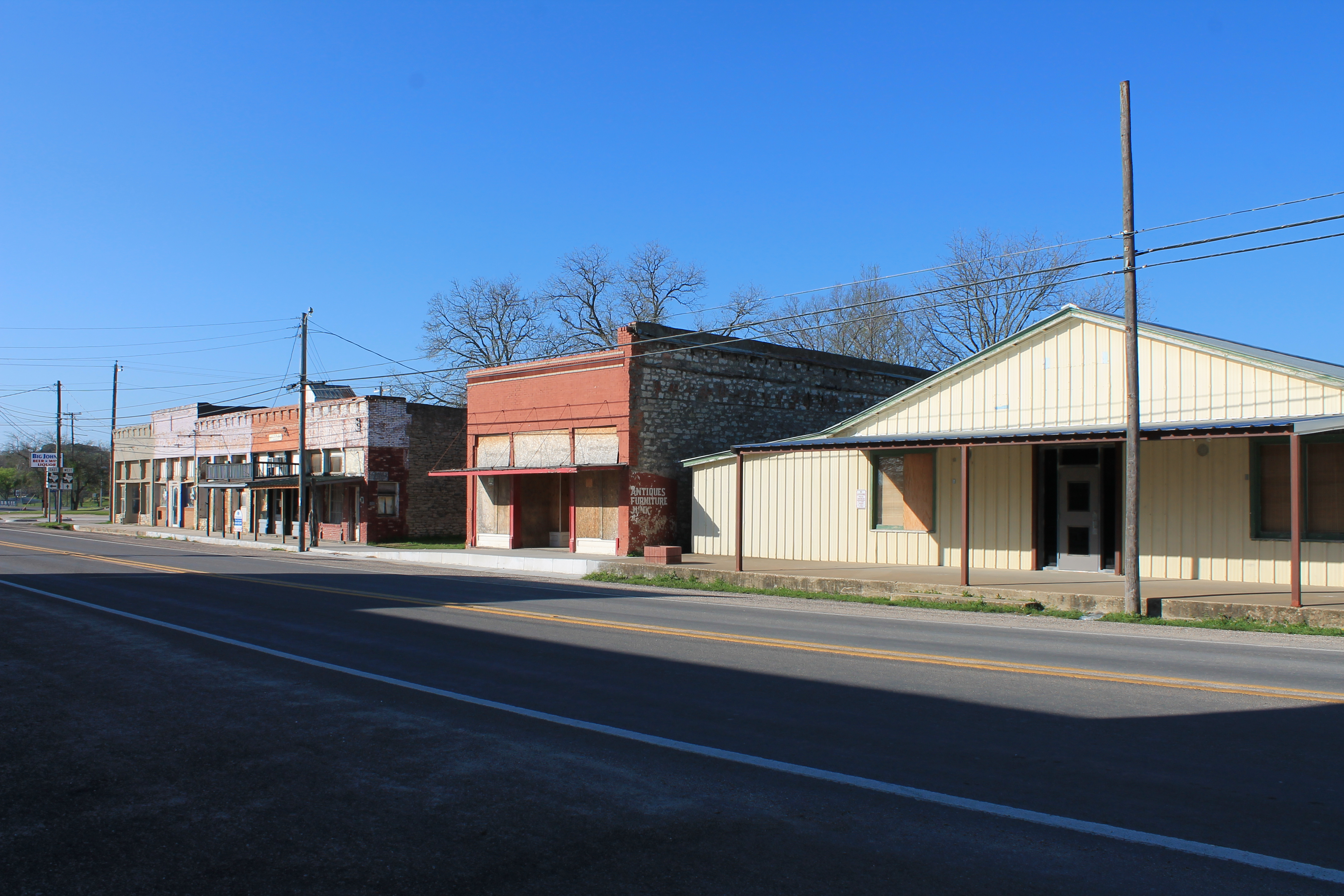
- Along SH 144 (3rd Street) in Walnut Springs, March 2012

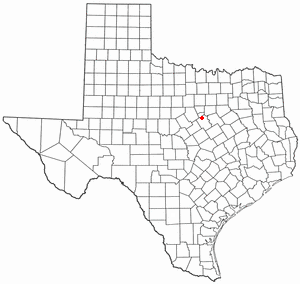
- Location of Walnut Springs, Texas

- Coordinates: 32°03′24″N 97°44′52″W
- Country: United States
- State: Texas
- County: Bosque

Area
  - Total: 1.34 sq mi (3.47 km^{2})
  - Land: 1.33 sq mi (3.45 km^{2})
  - Water: 0.0077 sq mi (0.02 km^{2})
- Elevation: 902 ft (275 m)

Population (2020)
  - Total: 795
  - Density: 597/sq mi (230/km^{2})
- Time zone: UTC-6 (Central (CST))
  - Summer (DST): UTC-5 (CDT)
- ZIP code: 76690
- Area code: 254
- FIPS code: 48-76348
- GNIS feature ID: 2412175
- Website: cityofwalnutsprings.org

Walnut Springs is a city in Bosque County. Texas, United States. The population was 795 at the 2020 census.

== Geography ==
According to the United States Census Bureau, the city has a total area of 1.3 square miles (3.4 km^{2}), all land.

== Demographics ==
Historical population
Census	Pop.	Note	%±
1890	682		—
1910	1,340		—
1920	1,449		8.1%
1930	765		−47.2%
1940	723		−5.5%
1950	626		−13.4%
1960	490		−21.7%
1970	495		1.0%
1980	613		23.8%
1990	716		16.8%
2000	755		5.4%
2010	827		9.5%
2020	795		−3.9%
U.S. Decennial Census

=== 2020 census ===
As of the 2020 census, Walnut Springs had 795 residents in 287 households and 209 families. The median age was 33.1 years. 28.9% of residents were under the age of 18 and 13.0% of residents were 65 years of age or older. For every 100 females there were 104.9 males, and for every 100 females age 18 and over there were 100.4 males age 18 and over.

0.0% of residents lived in urban areas, while 100.0% lived in rural areas.

There were 287 households in Walnut Springs, of which 39.4% had children under the age of 18 living in them. Of all households, 46.0% were married-couple households, 20.9% were households with a male householder and no spouse or partner present, and 25.4% were households with a female householder and no spouse or partner present. About 26.2% of all households were made up of individuals and 10.1% had someone living alone who was 65 years of age or older.

There were 330 housing units, of which 13.0% were vacant. The homeowner vacancy rate was 1.8% and the rental vacancy rate was 8.8%.

Racial composition as of the 2020 census
Race	Number	Percent
White	523	65.8%
Black or African American	3	0.4%
American Indian and Alaska Native	8	1.0%
Asian	0	0.0%
Native Hawaiian and Other Pacific Islander	0	0.0%
Some other race	131	16.5%
Two or more races	130	16.4%
Hispanic or Latino (of any race)	336	42.3%

=== 2000 census ===
As of the census of 2000, 755 people, 262 households, and 190 families were residing in the city. The population density was 566.4 people/sq mi (219.2/km^{2}). The 312 housing units averaged 234.1/sq mi (90.6/km^{2}). The racial makeup of the city was 87.95% White, 1.32% Native American, 8.08% from other races, and 2.65% from two or more races. Hispanics or Latinos of any race were 28.08% of the population.

Of the 262 households, 35.9% had children under 18 living with them, 56.9% were married couples living together, 9.5% had a female householder with no husband present, and 27.1% were not families. About 24.4% of all households were made up of individuals, and 13.4% had someone living alone who was 65 or older. The average household size was 2.88, and the average family size was 3.46.

In the city, the age distribution was 33.0% under 18, 8.3% from 18 to 24, 25.0% from 25 to 44, 19.6% from 45 to 64, and 14.0% who were 65 or older. The median age was 33 years. For every 100 females, there were 103.5 males. For every 100 females age 18 and over, there were 95.4 males.

The median income for a household in the city was $24,598, and for a family was $35,000. Males had a median income of $24,643 versus $14,875 for females. The per capita income for the city was $11,332. About 19.7% of families and 30.5% of the population were below the poverty line, including 41.7% of those under 18 and 17.2% of those 65 or over.

== Education ==
The City of Walnut Springs is served by the Walnut Springs Independent School District. The city features a single high school, Walnut Springs High School.

== Gallery ==
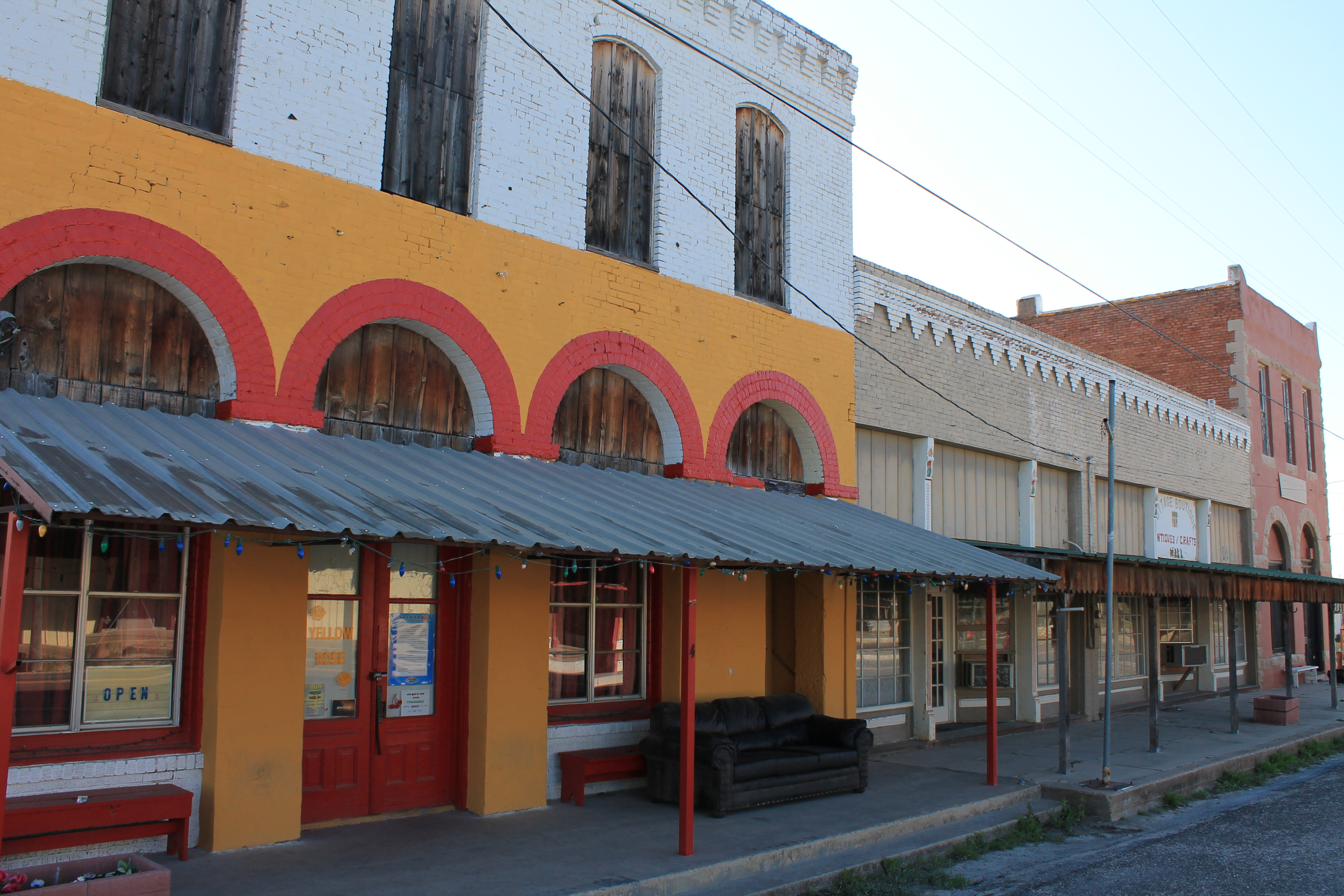

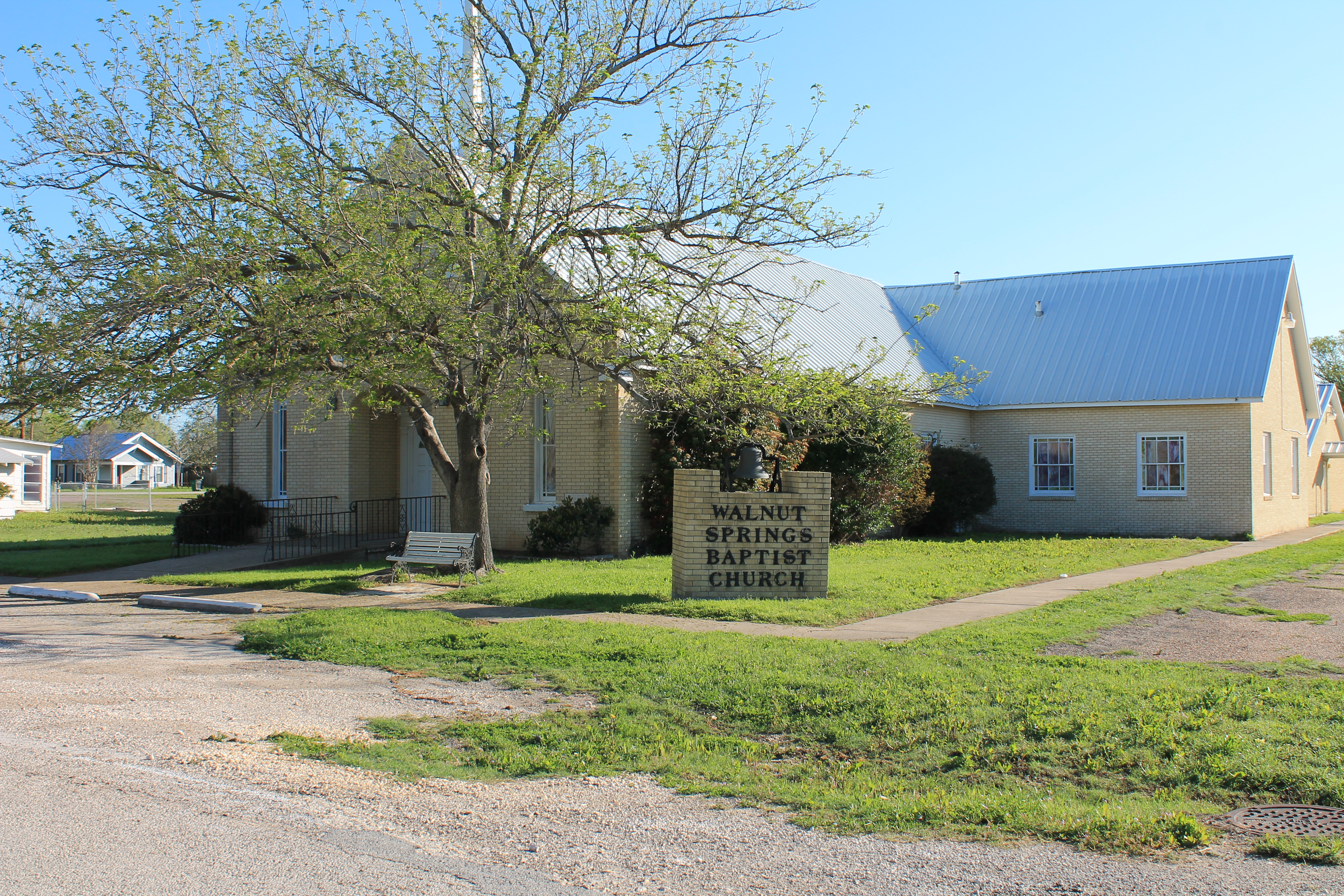

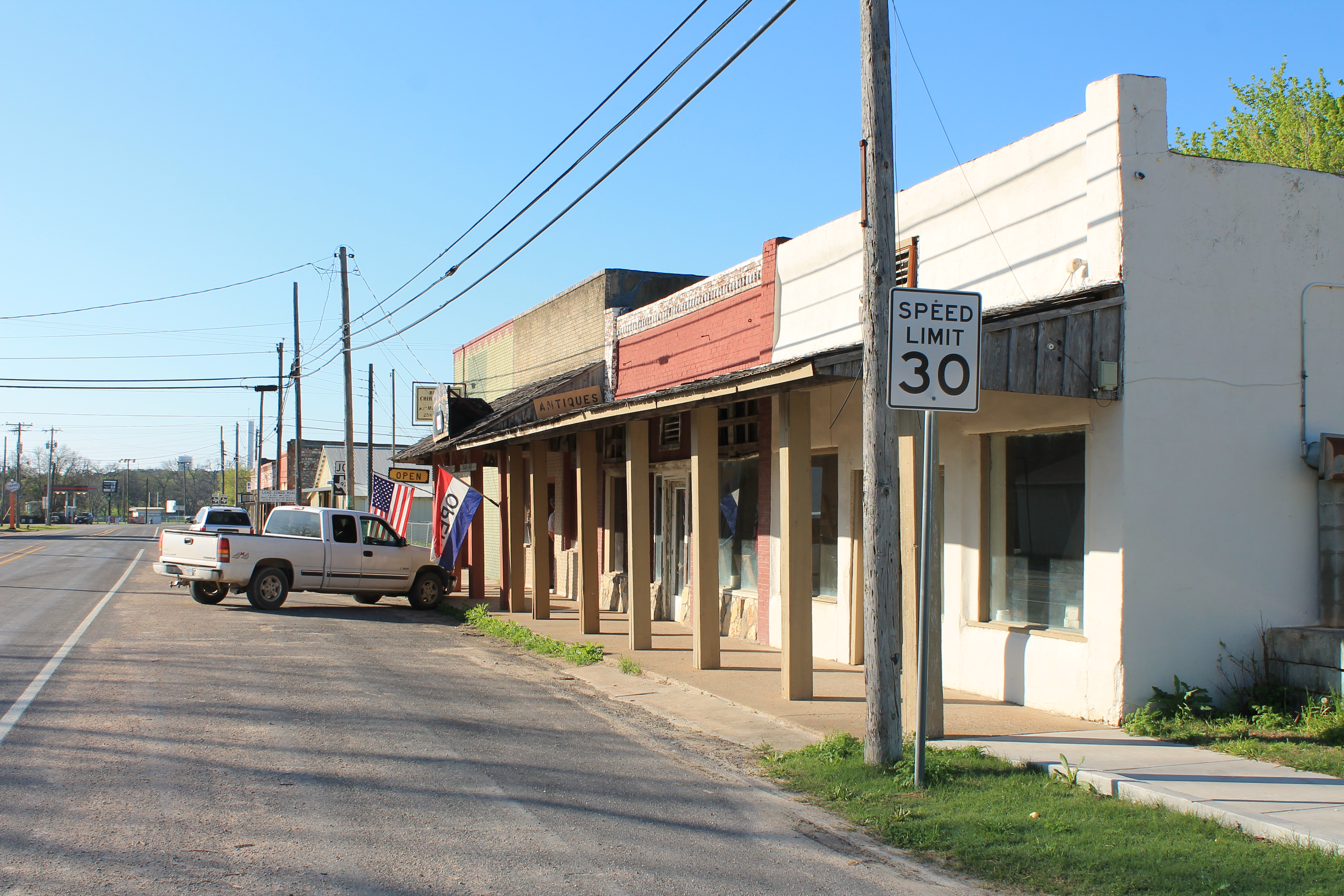

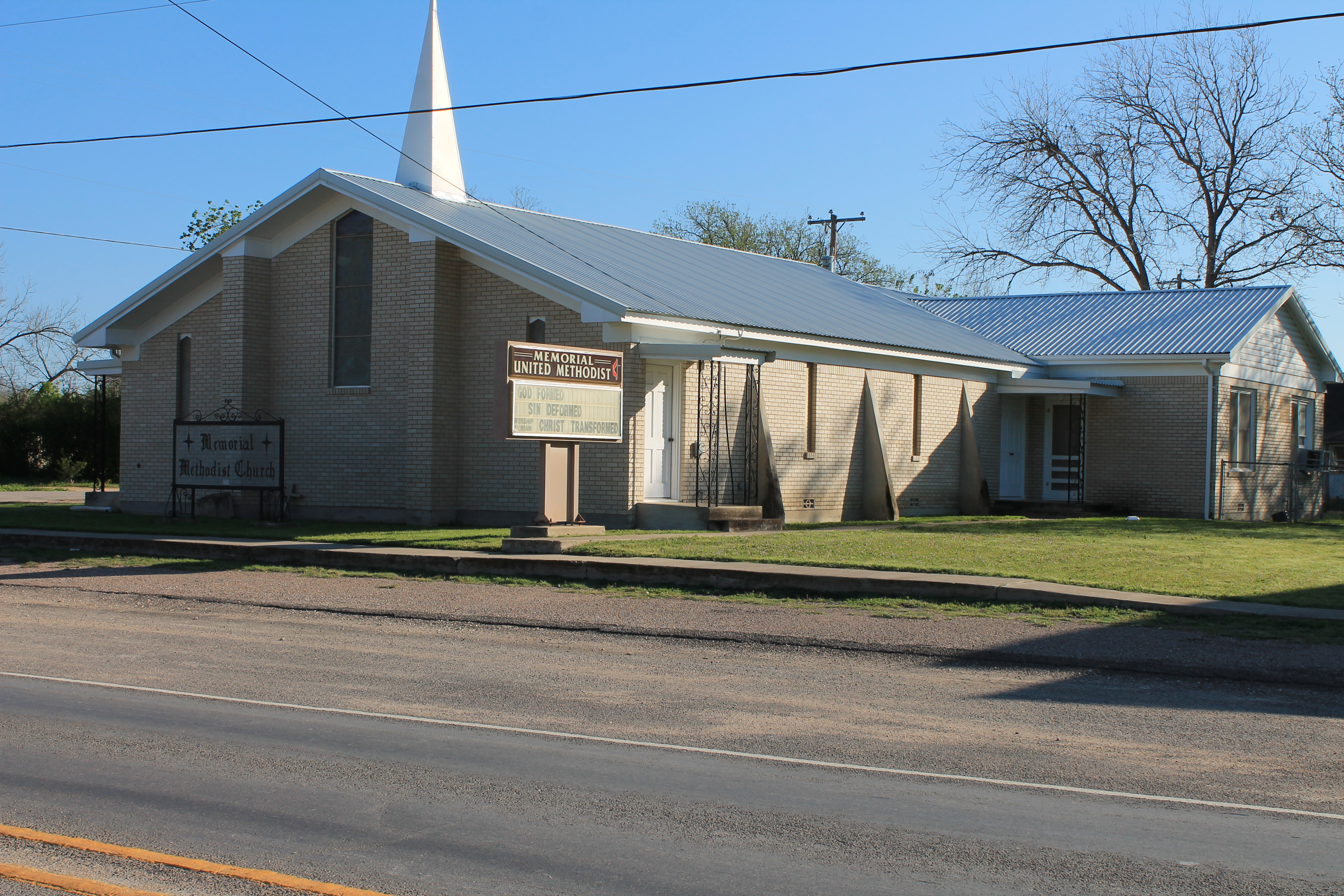

== See also ==
- List of municipalities in Texas
