= Valley Mills Independent School District =

School district in Texas

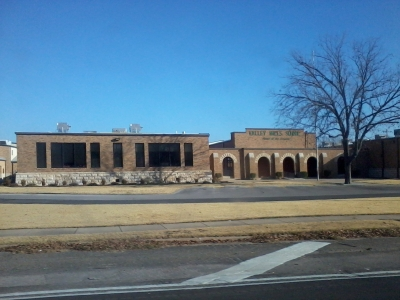
Valley Mills Elementary School

Valley Mills Independent School District is a public school district based in Valley Mills, Texas (USA). The district is located in southern Bosque County and portions of McLennan and Coryell counties.

In 2009, the school district was rated "academically acceptable" by the Texas Education Agency.

== Campuses ==
Valley Mills ISD has three campuses:

- Valley Mills High School (Grades 6-12)
- Valley Mills Elementary (Grades PK-5)
