= Morgan Independent School District =

School district in Texas

Coordinates: 32.01960°N 97.6068°W

Morgan Independent School District is a public school district based in Morgan, Texas (USA).

The district has one school that serves students in grades pre-kindergarten through twelve. The Eagle is Morgan ISD's mascot.

== Academic achievement ==
In 2015, the school was rated "Improvement Required" by the Texas Education Agency.

== Special programs ==
=== Athletics ===
Morgan High School plays six-man football.

== See also ==
- List of school districts in Texas
- List of high schools in Texas
