= Iredell, Texas =

City in Bosque County, Texas, United States

- City
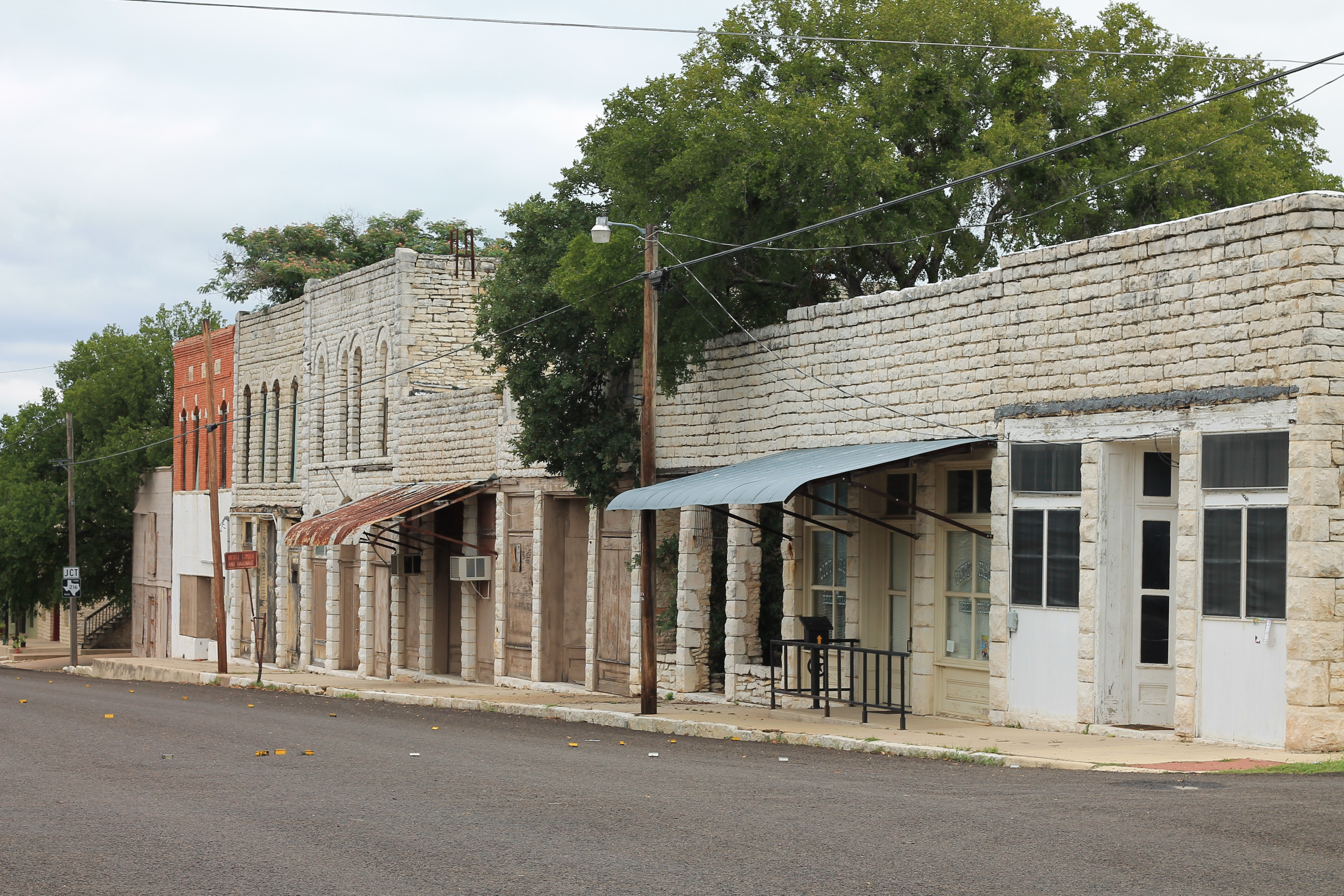

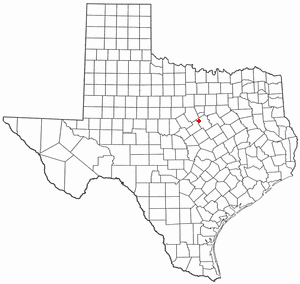
- Location of Iredell, Texas

- Coordinates: 31°59′15″N 97°52′24″W
- Country: United States
- State: Texas
- County: Bosque

Area
  - Total: 0.46 sq mi (1.19 km^{2})
  - Land: 0.45 sq mi (1.16 km^{2})
  - Water: 0.0077 sq mi (0.02 km^{2})
- Elevation: 883 ft (269 m)

Population (2020)
  - Total: 305
  - Density: 681/sq mi (263/km^{2})
- Time zone: UTC-6 (Central (CST))
  - Summer (DST): UTC-5 (CDT)
- ZIP code: 76649
- Area code: 254
- FIPS code: 48-36140
- GNIS feature ID: 2410114

Iredell (/ˈaɪərdɛl/ IRE-del) is a city in Bosque County, Texas, United States. The population was 305 at the 2020 census.

== Geography ==
According to the United States Census Bureau, the city has a total area of 0.5 square miles (1.3 km^{2}), all land.

== Demographics ==
Historical population
Census	Pop.	Note	%±
1880	171		—
1890	251		46.8%
1940	483		—
1950	394		−18.4%
1960	366		−7.1%
1970	316		−13.7%
1980	407		28.8%
1990	339		−16.7%
2000	360		6.2%
2010	339		−5.8%
2020	305		−10.0%
U.S. Decennial Census; 2020 Census

=== 2020 census ===
As of the 2020 census, Iredell had a population of 305. The median age was 35.9 years. 25.6% of residents were under the age of 18 and 21.6% of residents were 65 years of age or older. For every 100 females there were 102.0 males, and for every 100 females age 18 and over there were 102.7 males age 18 and over.

0.0% of residents lived in urban areas, while 100.0% lived in rural areas.

There were 119 households in Iredell, of which 37.8% had children under the age of 18 living in them. Of all households, 53.8% were married-couple households, 19.3% were households with a male householder and no spouse or partner present, and 21.8% were households with a female householder and no spouse or partner present. About 23.6% of all households were made up of individuals and 13.4% had someone living alone who was 65 years of age or older.

There were 152 housing units, of which 21.7% were vacant. The homeowner vacancy rate was 0.0% and the rental vacancy rate was 23.1%.

Racial composition as of the 2020 census
Race	Number	Percent
White	256	83.9%
Black or African American	1	0.3%
American Indian and Alaska Native	1	0.3%
Asian	0	0.0%
Native Hawaiian and Other Pacific Islander	0	0.0%
Some other race	16	5.2%
Two or more races	31	10.2%
Hispanic or Latino (of any race)	72	23.6%

=== 2000 census ===
As of the census of 2000, there were 360 people, 146 households, and 104 families residing in the city. The population density was 783.8 inhabitants per square mile (302.6/km^{2}). There were 162 housing units at an average density of 352.7 per square mile (136.2/km^{2}). The racial makeup of the city was 96.94% White, 2.50% from other races, and 0.56% from two or more races. Hispanic or Latino of any race were 5.56% of the population.

There were 146 households, out of which 33.6% had children under the age of 18 living with them, 60.3% were married couples living together, 9.6% had a female householder with no husband present, and 28.1% were non-families. 27.4% of all households were made up of individuals, and 15.1% had someone living alone who was 65 years of age or older. The average household size was 2.47 and the average family size was 2.98.

In the city, the population was spread out, with 28.3% under the age of 18, 6.4% from 18 to 24, 26.1% from 25 to 44, 21.1% from 45 to 64, and 18.1% who were 65 years of age or older. The median age was 38 years. For every 100 females, there were 96.7 males. For every 100 females age 18 and over, there were 94.0 males.

The median income for a household in the city was $22,083, and the median income for a family was $27,917. Males had a median income of $34,583 versus $25,577 for females. The per capita income for the city was $12,152. About 20.4% of families and 24.5% of the population were below the poverty line, including 40.2% of those under age 18 and 21.2% of those age 65 or over.

== Education ==
Iredell is served by the Iredell Independent School District.

== Notable people ==
- Clara McDonald Williamson, a Naïve painter who was born in Iredell, and lived there for much of her early life
- Foy Willing was born in Iredell. He was a singer, songwriter, musician

== See also ==
- List of municipalities in Texas
