= Kopperl Independent School District =

School district in Texas

Kopperl Independent School District is a public school district based in the community of Kopperl, Texas (USA). The district operates one school that serves students in grades pre-kindergarten through twelve.

== Academic achievement ==
In 2015, the school was rated "Met Standard" by the Texas Education Agency.

== Special programs ==
=== Athletics ===
Kopperl High School plays six-man football.

== See also ==
- List of school districts in Texas
