= Valley Mills, Texas =

City in Bosque and McLennan counties in Texas, United States

- City
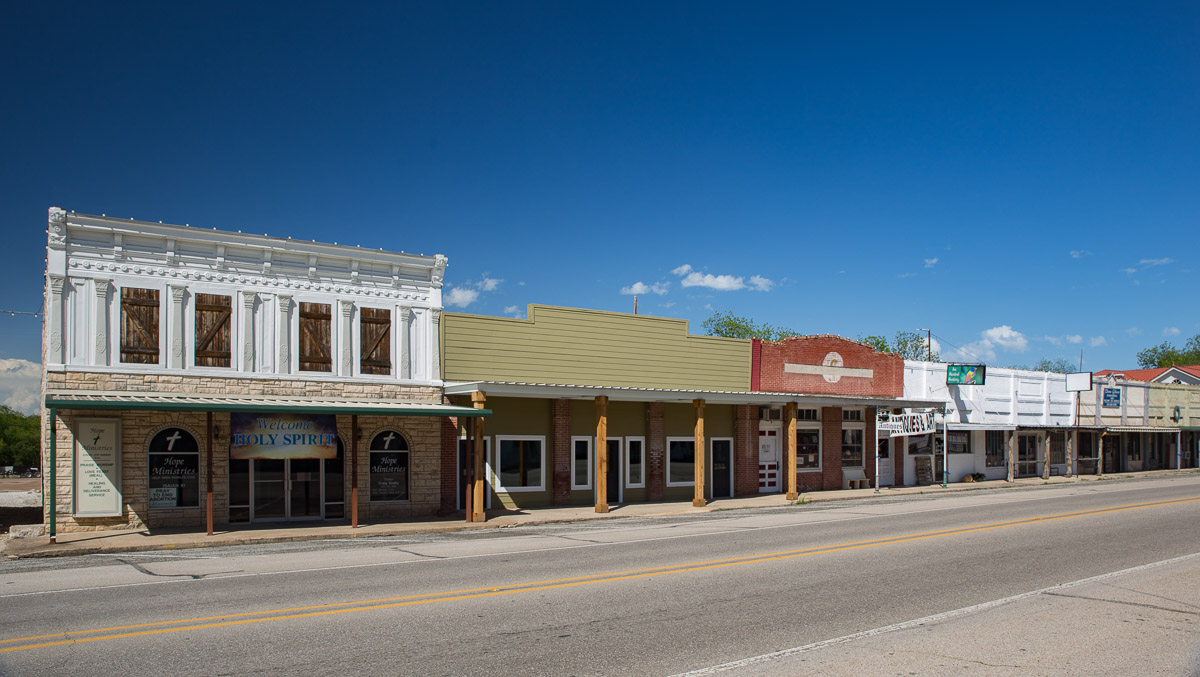
- Texas State Highway 6 in Downtown Valley Mills, April 2020

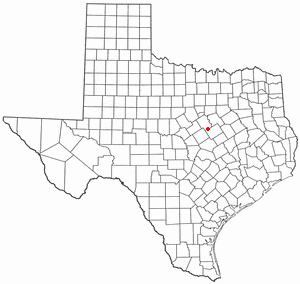
- Location of Valley Mills, Texas

- Coordinates: 31°38′27″N 97°26′31″W
- Country: United States
- State: Texas
- Counties: Bosque, McLennan

Area
  - Total: 0.76 sq mi (1.97 km^{2})
  - Land: 0.76 sq mi (1.96 km^{2})
  - Water: 0 sq mi (0.00 km^{2})
- Elevation: 597 ft (182 m)

Population (2020)
  - Total: 1,229
  - Density: 1,620/sq mi (627/km^{2})
- Time zone: UTC-6 (Central (CST))
  - Summer (DST): UTC-5 (CDT)
- ZIP code: 76689
- Area code: 254
- FIPS code: 48-74732
- GNIS feature ID: 2412143
- Website: www.vmtx.us

Valley Mills is a city in Bosque and McLennan counties in central Texas, United States. The population was 1,229 at the 2020 census.

The McLennan County portion of Valley Mills is part of the Waco Metropolitan Statistical Area.

== History ==
Valley Mills was named for a flour mill established on the banks of the Bosque River in 1867 by Dr. E.P. Booth and Asbury Stegall.

In 1881, the Gulf, Colorado and Santa Fe Railway (GC&SF) laid tracks a mile south of the community, across the Bosque River. Merchants, hoping to benefit from the railroad, began moving their stores across the river, to the tracks.

On February 17, 1882, a cyclone (tornado) hit the new townsite, destroying a large number of buildings. Nevertheless, the remaining residents from the community's original site moved across the river and rebuilt their homes. Thus, by the end of 1882 Valley Mills had extended into McLennan County.

Dairy farming and stock raising were the principal industries of the community. By 1900, however, the railroad and the nearby Chisholm Trail had made Valley Mills a prosperous retail and trading center for Bosque and McLennan counties. The community's population reached 855 by 1905. Like many rural Texas communities, Valley Mills declined during the 1930s. Following World War II, however, as farm prices increased and ranching prospered, the economy grew, and the population, which had declined to 803 by 1937, increased to 1,037 by the mid-1950s. During the next three decades Valley Mills maintained its position as a leading retail market and shipping point for Bosque and McLennan counties.

The town was hit by an F5 tornado on May 6, 1973, nearly 20 years after the infamous 1953 Waco Tornado, and despite its F5 rating, there were no deaths in the Valley Mills tornado.

In 1984, it had a newspaper, a municipal airport, more than 25 businesses, several dairy farms and ranches, and a population of 1,236. A new school was opened in 1988; it and four churches were the social centers of the community. In 1990, the population was 1,085. In 2010, the population was 1,203.

== Geography ==
=== Climate ===
The climate in this area is characterized by hot, humid summers and generally mild to cool winters. According to the Köppen Climate Classification system, Valley Mills has a humid subtropical climate, abbreviated "Cfa" on climate maps.

== Demographics ==
Historical population
Census	Pop.	Note	%±
1880	113		—
1890	300		165.5%
1900	519		73.0%
1910	708		36.4%
1920	855		20.8%
1930	936		9.5%
1940	803		−14.2%
1950	1,037		29.1%
1960	1,061		2.3%
1970	1,022		−3.7%
1980	1,236		20.9%
1990	1,085		−12.2%
2000	1,123		3.5%
2010	1,203		7.1%
2020	1,229		2.2%
U.S. Decennial Census

=== 2020 census ===
As of the 2020 census, Valley Mills had a population of 1,229, 462 households, and 371 families residing in the city.

The median age was 32.5 years. 29.0% of residents were under the age of 18 and 13.9% of residents were 65 years of age or older. For every 100 females there were 91.1 males, and for every 100 females age 18 and over there were 87.5 males age 18 and over.

0.0% of residents lived in urban areas, while 100.0% lived in rural areas.

There were 462 households in Valley Mills, of which 43.1% had children under the age of 18 living in them. Of all households, 49.1% were married-couple households, 14.5% were households with a male householder and no spouse or partner present, and 29.0% were households with a female householder and no spouse or partner present. About 25.2% of all households were made up of individuals and 11.9% had someone living alone who was 65 years of age or older.

There were 519 housing units, of which 11.0% were vacant. The homeowner vacancy rate was 3.2% and the rental vacancy rate was 13.5%.

Racial composition as of the 2020 census
Race	Number	Percent
White	937	76.2%
Black or African American	31	2.5%
American Indian and Alaska Native	5	0.4%
Asian	2	0.2%
Native Hawaiian and Other Pacific Islander	0	0.0%
Some other race	113	9.2%
Two or more races	141	11.5%
Hispanic or Latino (of any race)	234	19.0%

=== 2000 census ===
As of the census of 2000, there were 1,123 people, 430 households, and 301 families residing in the city. The population density was 1,601.2 inhabitants per square mile (618.2/km^{2}). There were 487 housing units at an average density of 694.4 units per square mile (268.1 units/km^{2}). The racial makeup of the city was 86.73% White, 4.99% African American, 0.36% Native American, 0.27% Asian, 5.97% from other races, and 1.69% from two or more races. Hispanic or Latino of any race were 8.73% of the population.

There were 430 households, out of which 33.3% had children under the age of 18 living with them, 52.8% were married couples living together, 11.9% had a female householder with no husband present, and 30.0% were non-families. 28.6% of all households were made up of individuals, and 15.8% had someone living alone who was 65 years of age or older. The average household size was 2.49 and the average family size was 3.03.

In the city, the population was spread out, with 27.0% under the age of 18, 6.5% from 18 to 24, 25.1% from 25 to 44, 20.7% from 45 to 64, and 20.7% who were 65 years of age or older. The median age was 38 years. For every 100 females, there were 85.3 males. For every 100 females age 18 and over, there were 76.3 males.

The median income for a household in the city was $32,115, and the median income for a family was $39,659. Males had a median income of $35,000 versus $18,125 for females. The per capita income for the city was $15,062. About 6.7% of families and 9.3% of the population were below the poverty line, including 7.7% of those under age 18 and 17.7% of those age 65 or over.

== Education ==
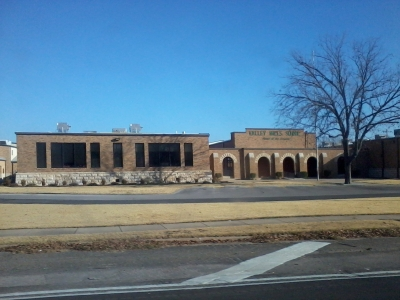
Valley Mills Elementary School

Valley Mills is served by the Valley Mills Independent School District and home to Valley Mills High School.

== Transportation ==
=== Highways ===
- Texas State Highway 6 is also designated as Avenue C. Although it is a north–south highway, it passes through downtown in a west-northwest to east-southeast direction. To the south, it leads to Waco. To the north, it leads to Clifton.
- Texas State Highway 317 is also designated as S 7th Street and terminates at Highway 6. To the south, it leads to Crawford.

=== Rail ===
Valley Mills is located on a BNSF Railway line connecting Temple to Cleburne. As of 2024, the rail line is used by the Texas Eagle, an Amtrak passenger train connecting Chicago to San Antonio via Dallas and Cleburne, but the train does not serve Valley Mills; the nearest scheduled stop is McGregor station in McGregor.

=== Air ===
Valley Mills Municipal Airport (FAA LID: 9F1) is a city-owned public airport used for general aviation and located approximately 3 nautical miles (5.6 km) southeast of the central business district. The airport has no IATA or ICAO designation.

The airport covers 90 acres (36 ha) at an elevation of 751 feet (229 m) above mean sea level (AMSL), and has two runways:

- Runway 6/24: 3,028 x 40 ft. (922 x 12 m), Surface: Turf
- Runway 14/32: 2,788 x 40 ft. (850 x 12 m), Surface: Turf

For the 12-month period ending 3 October 2024, no aircraft operations were reported. At that time there were no aircraft based at the airport.

Other airports serving the area include: Waco Regional Airport, TSTC Waco Airport and Draughen-Miller Central Texas Regional Airport

== Notable people ==
- Isaac Brock (died 1909), once claimed to be the longest-lived American in history
- Donnie Sadler, Major League Baseball player

== See also ==
- List of municipalities in Texas
