= Bosque County, Texas =

County in Texas, United States

- County
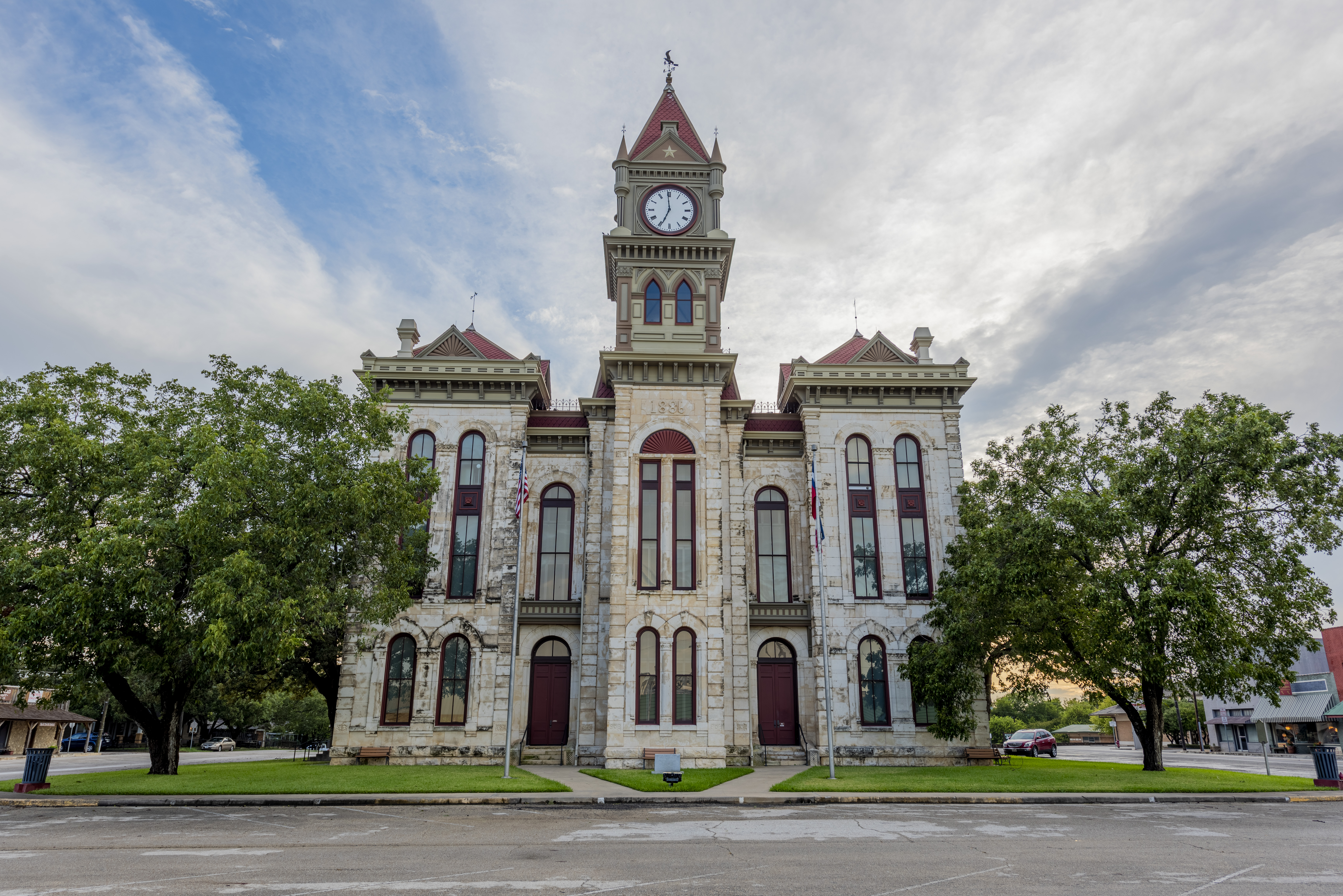
- The Bosque County Courthouse in Meridian

- Location within the U.S. state of Texas
- Coordinates: 31°54′N 97°38′W
- Country: United States
- State: Texas
- Founded: 1854
- Named for: Bosque River
- Seat: Meridian
- Largest city: Clifton

Area
  - Total: 1,003 sq mi (2,600 km^{2})
  - Land: 983 sq mi (2,550 km^{2})
  - Water: 20 sq mi (52 km^{2}) 1.99%

Population (2020)
  - Total: 18,235
  - Estimate (2025): 18,918 ▲
  - Density: 18.6/sq mi (7.16/km^{2})
- Time zone: UTC−6 (Central)
  - Summer (DST): UTC−5 (CDT)
- Congressional district: 31st
- Website: www.bosquecounty.gov

Bosque County (/ˈbɒski/ BOSS-kee) is a county located in the greater Waco area. The county sits just northwest of Waco in the U.S. state of Texas. As of the 2020 census, the population was 18,235. Its county seat is Meridian, while Clifton is the largest city of the county. The county is named for the Bosque River, which runs through the center of the county north to south. The Brazos River makes up the eastern border, along with the Lake Whitney reservoir it feeds.

Since 2025, Bosque County has been represented in the Texas House of Representatives by Republican Helen Kerwin.

== History ==
In 1721, while traveling from San Antonio de Béxar to a mission in East Texas, the Marqués de San Miguel de Aguayo ventured north from the Old San Antonio Road, and camped along the Brazos River. Near his camp was also a tributary of the Brazos, which he named the Bosque, Spanish for forest. This was the first recorded European expedition through the region.

Until the 1850s, settlement of the region that was to become Bosque County remained sparse. About a decade previous, some members of the ill-fated Texan Santa-Fe Expedition of 1841, which passed through the area, chose to stay. One particularly noteworthy attempt at settlement was the town of Kent. In 1850, the Universal Immigration Company of England purchased land for a townsite on the west side of the Brazos. After several years, 30 families were sent over by the company to settle the land, but the newly established community barely survived the first winter, suffering a number of fatalities. The following spring, the settlers planned to right the course of the settlement by purchasing some cattle and seed corn. This plan, too, would go awry, as the cattle would eat the corn before it could be harvested, because no fence was built around the corn. Eventually, the town of Kent dissolved, with most of the settlers choosing to go elsewhere, including some who returned to England.

Bosque County was officially created in 1854, being separated from McLennan County. The first election included 3 ballot boxes: one at the junction of Steele Creek and the Brazos River, one in Meridian, and another at a live oak between Clifton and Valley Mills. This live oak became known as the Bosque County Oak. Locally the oak is known as the "Election Oak".

The voters at the first election were L. H. Scrutchfield, J. K. Helton, J. N. Mabray, Capt. Underhill, James Mabray, William Gary, Gafey Gary, Isaac Gary, Matt Gary, John Robertson, John Thomas, F. M. Kell, Archie Kell, William McCurry, Jack McCurry, Lum McCurry, Samuel Locker, Nathaniel Morgan, R. S. Barnes, J. P. Locker. They elected the following county officers: L. H. Scrutchfield, Judge; P. Bryant, Sheriff; J. N. Mabray, Clerk; Isaac Gary, Assessor and Collector; Archabal Kell, Treasurer.

== Geography ==
According to the U.S. Census Bureau, the county has a total area of 1,003 sq mi (2,600 km^{2}), of which 983 sq mi (2,550 km^{2}) are land and 20 square miles (52 km^{2}) (2.0%) are covered by water.

=== Major highways ===
- State Highway 6
- State Highway 22
- State Highway 144
- State Highway 174
- State Highway 317

=== Adjacent counties ===
- Somervell County (north)
- Johnson County (northeast)
- Hill County (east)
- McLennan County (southeast)
- Coryell County (south)
- Hamilton County (west)
- Erath County (northwest)

== Demographics ==
Historical population
Census	Pop.	Note	%±
1860	2,005		—
1870	4,981		148.4%
1880	11,217		125.2%
1890	14,224		26.8%
1900	17,390		22.3%
1910	19,013		9.3%
1920	18,032		−5.2%
1930	15,750		−12.7%
1940	15,761		0.1%
1950	11,836		−24.9%
1960	10,809		−8.7%
1970	10,966		1.5%
1980	13,401		22.2%
1990	15,125		12.9%
2000	17,204		13.7%
2010	18,212		5.9%
2020	18,235		0.1%
2024 (est.)	18,918	▲	3.7%
U.S. Decennial Census; 1850–2010 2010 2020

=== Racial and ethnic composition ===
Bosque County, Texas – Racial and ethnic composition Note: the US Census treats Hispanic/Latino as an ethnic category. This table excludes Latinos from the racial categories and assigns them to a separate category. Hispanics/Latinos may be of any race.
Race / Ethnicity (NH = Non-Hispanic)	Pop 1980	Pop 1990	Pop 2000	Pop 2010	Pop 2020	% 1980	% 1990	% 2000	% 2010	% 2020
White alone (NH)	12,320	13,320	14,507	14,701	13,621	91.93%	88.07%	84.32%	80.72%	74.70%
Black or African American alone (NH)	294	312	320	277	244	2.19%	2.06%	1.86%	1.52%	1.34%
Native American or Alaska Native alone (NH)	37	25	73	74	83	0.28%	0.17%	0.42%	0.41%	0.46%
Asian alone (NH)	33	32	19	38	80	0.25%	0.21%	0.11%	0.21%	0.44%
Native Hawaiian or Pacific Islander alone (NH)	x	x	1	2	3	x	x	0.01%	0.01%	0.02%
Other race alone (NH)	16	6	6	9	29	0.12%	0.04%	0.03%	0.05%	0.16%
Mixed race or Multiracial (NH)	x	x	174	185	854	x	x	1.01%	1.02%	4.68%
Hispanic or Latino (any race)	701	1,430	2,104	2,926	3,321	5.23%	9.45%	12.23%	16.07%	18.21%
Total	13,401	15,125	17,204	18,212	18,235	100.00%	100.00%	100.00%	100.00%	100.00%

=== 2020 census ===
As of the 2020 census, the county had a population of 18,235. The median age was 48.3 years. 20.7% of residents were under the age of 18 and 25.7% of residents were 65 years of age or older. For every 100 females there were 97.5 males, and for every 100 females age 18 and over there were 96.1 males age 18 and over.

The racial makeup of the county was 79.4% White, 1.5% Black or African American, 0.9% American Indian and Alaska Native, 0.4% Asian, <0.1% Native Hawaiian and Pacific Islander, 7.2% from some other race, and 10.5% from two or more races. Hispanic or Latino residents of any race comprised 18.2% of the population.

<0.1% of residents lived in urban areas, while 100.0% lived in rural areas.

There were 7,391 households in the county, of which 27.0% had children under the age of 18 living in them. Of all households, 53.6% were married-couple households, 17.5% were households with a male householder and no spouse or partner present, and 23.3% were households with a female householder and no spouse or partner present. About 27.0% of all households were made up of individuals and 14.8% had someone living alone who was 65 years of age or older.

There were 9,284 housing units, of which 20.4% were vacant. Among occupied housing units, 77.1% were owner-occupied and 22.9% were renter-occupied. The homeowner vacancy rate was 2.2% and the rental vacancy rate was 10.4%.

=== 2010 census ===
A Williams Institute analysis of 2010 census data found about 2.5 same-sex couples per 1,000 households in the county.

=== 2000 census ===
As of the 2000 census, 17,204 people, 6,726 households, and 4,856 families were residing in the county. The population density was 17 people/mi^{2} (6.6 people/km^{2}). The 8,644 housing units averaged 9 per square mile (3.5/km^{2}). The racial makeup of the county was 90.75% White, 1.92% African American, 0.55% Native American, 0.11% Asian, 5.2% from other races, and 1.47% from two or more races. About 12.23% of the population were Hispanic or Latino of any race.

Of the 6,726 households, 29.5% had children under 18 living with them, 60.6% were married couples living together, 8.2% had a female householder with no husband present, and 27.8% were not families. About 25.4% of all households were made up of individuals, and 14.1% had someone living alone who was 65 or older. The average household size was 2.48, and the average family size was 2.95.

In the county, the age distribution was 24.4% under 18, 6.2% from 18 to 24, 23.8% from 25 to 44, 25.0% from 45 to 64, and 20.5% who were 65 or older. The median age was 42 years. For every 100 females, there were 95.90 males. For every 100 females age 18 and over, there were 92.30 males.

The median income for a household in the county was $34,181, and for a family was $40,763. Males had a median income of $31,669 versus $21,739 for females. The per capita income for the county was $17,455. About 8.9% of families and 12.7% of the population were below the poverty line, including 16.8% of those under 18 and 14.6% of those 65 or over.

== Media ==
Bosque County is currently listed as part of the Dallas-Fort Worth DMA. Local media outlets include: KDFW-TV, KXAS-TV, WFAA-TV, KTVT-TV, KERA-TV, KTXA-TV, KDFI-TV, KDAF-TV, and KFWD-TV. Although located in Central Texas and a neighboring county of the Waco and Killeen – Temple – Fort Hood metropolitan areas. Meaning all of the Waco/Temple/Killeen market stations also provide coverage for Bosque County. They include: KCEN-TV, KWTX-TV, KXXV-TV, KDYW, and KWKT-TV.

Newspapers include The Clinton Record and Meridian Tribune, both run by BosqueCountyToday.com.

== Politics ==
United States presidential election results for Bosque County, Texas
Year	Republican		Democratic		Third party(ies)	
Year	No.	%	No.	%	No.	%
1912	64	4.67%	1,217	88.90%	88	6.43%
1916	179	9.85%	1,561	85.91%	77	4.24%
1920	567	22.29%	1,556	61.16%	421	16.55%
1924	403	13.36%	2,534	83.99%	80	2.65%
1928	1,526	55.19%	1,235	44.67%	4	0.14%
1932	272	7.80%	3,214	92.12%	3	0.09%
1936	350	13.27%	2,283	86.54%	5	0.19%
1940	595	16.17%	3,083	83.78%	2	0.05%
1944	504	15.11%	2,502	75.02%	329	9.87%
1948	501	16.95%	2,303	77.91%	152	5.14%
1952	1,982	50.45%	1,940	49.38%	7	0.18%
1956	1,654	49.65%	1,670	50.14%	7	0.21%
1960	1,653	46.89%	1,852	52.54%	20	0.57%
1964	1,024	27.52%	2,690	72.29%	7	0.19%
1968	1,377	35.12%	1,817	46.34%	727	18.54%
1972	2,947	74.12%	1,014	25.50%	15	0.38%
1976	1,912	39.16%	2,954	60.50%	17	0.35%
1980	2,908	53.49%	2,431	44.71%	98	1.80%
1984	3,923	65.57%	2,046	34.20%	14	0.23%
1988	3,458	56.26%	2,670	43.44%	19	0.31%
1992	2,300	35.44%	2,173	33.49%	2,016	31.07%
1996	2,840	47.13%	2,427	40.28%	759	12.60%
2000	4,745	70.09%	1,930	28.51%	95	1.40%
2004	5,737	75.63%	1,815	23.93%	34	0.45%
2008	5,762	75.36%	1,797	23.50%	87	1.14%
2012	5,885	80.00%	1,367	18.58%	104	1.41%
2016	6,339	80.58%	1,278	16.25%	250	3.18%
2020	7,469	81.72%	1,561	17.08%	110	1.20%
2024	7,969	83.22%	1,524	15.91%	83	0.87%

Like most of Texas, Bosque County was heavily Democratic throughout the first two-thirds of the twentieth century. Before 1980, Republicans won the county only three times in presidential elections. After 1980, however, the county became strongly Republican and now favors the party by significant margins. The only exceptions to this trend were in 1992 and 1996, when Texan Ross Perot received significant amounts of votes for his third-party presidential bids.

United States Senate election results for Bosque County, Texas1
Year	Republican		Democratic		Third party(ies)	
Year	No.	%	No.	%	No.	%
2024	7,643	80.01%	1,712	17.92%	198	2.07%

United States Senate election results for Bosque County, Texas2
Year	Republican		Democratic		Third party(ies)	
Year	No.	%	No.	%	No.	%
2020	7,367	81.50%	1,490	16.48%	182	2.01%

Texas Gubernatorial election results for Bosque County
Year	Republican		Democratic		Third party(ies)	
Year	No.	%	No.	%	No.	%
2022	6,278	84.07%	1,099	14.72%	91	1.22%

== Communities ==
=== Cities ===
- Clifton
- Cranfills Gap (small part in Hamilton County)
- Iredell
- Meridian (county seat)
- Morgan
- Valley Mills (small part in McLennan County)
- Walnut Springs

=== Census-designated places ===
- Kopperl
- Laguna Park
- Mosheim

=== Unincorporated communities ===
- Cayote
- Cedar Shores
- Eulogy
- Lakeside Village
- Norse
- Smith Bend
- Womack

== Education ==
School districts include:

- China Spring Independent School District
- Clifton Independent School District
- Cranfills Gap Independent School District
- Hico Independent School District
- Iredell Independent School District
- Jonesboro Independent School District
- Kopperl Independent School District
- Meridian Independent School District
- Morgan Independent School District
- Valley Mills Independent School District
- Walnut Springs Independent School District

All of Bosque County is in the Hill College District.

== Notable people ==
- Jacob De Cordova — land agent, member of Texas House of Representatives, 1808–1868
- Calvin Maples Cureton — Texas attorney general from 1919 to 1921, Texas chief justice 1921–1940
- James T. Draper Jr. — Texas Southern Baptist clergyman, a pastor in Iredell in Bosque County in the late 1950s
- James E. Ferguson — 26th governor of Texas
- Miriam A. Ferguson — 29th and 32nd governor of Texas
- Earle Bradford Mayfield — Texas state senator, United States senator
- John Lomax — American musicologist and folklorist

== See also ==
- National Register of Historic Places listings in Bosque County, Texas
- Recorded Texas Historic Landmarks in Bosque County

== Bibliography ==
- Bosque County History Book Committee, Bosque County, Land and People (Dallas: Curtis Media, 1985).
- Bosquerama, 1854-1954: Centennial Celebration of Bosque County, Texas (Meridian, Texas: Bosque County Centennial Association, 1954).
- William C. Pool, A History of Bosque County (San Marcos, Texas: San Marcos Record Press, 1954).
- William C. Pool, Bosque Territory (Kyle, Texas: Chaparral, 1964).
