= Clifton Independent School District =

School district in Texas, United States

Location
- Clifton, Texas; Bosque County (partly Coryell County); United States; 31.7892°N 97.5903°W

Information
- Type: Public
- Grades: PreK–12
- Website: www.cliftonisd.org

Clifton Independent School District is a public school district based in Clifton, Texas (US).

Located in Bosque County, a small portion of the district extends into Coryell County.

In 2010, the school district was rated "recognized" by the Texas Education Agency.

== Schools ==
- Clifton High School (Grades 9-12)

During 2022‍–‍2023, Clifton High School had an enrollment of 312 students in grades 9‍–‍12 and a student to teacher ratio of 11.06.

- Clifton Middle School (Grades 6-8)

During 2022‍–‍2023, Clifton Middle School had an enrollment of 241 students in grades 6‍–‍8 and a student to teacher ratio of 11.86.

- Clifton Elementary School (Grades PreK-5)

During 2022‍–‍2023, Clifton Elementary School had an enrollment of 471 students in grades PK‍–‍5 and a student to teacher ratio of 12.63.

== Board of trustees ==
- John Erickson (President)
- Kenneth Lowrance (Vice President)
- Greg Gloff (Sec./Tres.)
- Damaris Neelley
- John Thiele
- Vicki Gloff
- Jan Woosley
