= Brazos River =

River in Texas, United States

Brazos River Río de los Brazos de Dios
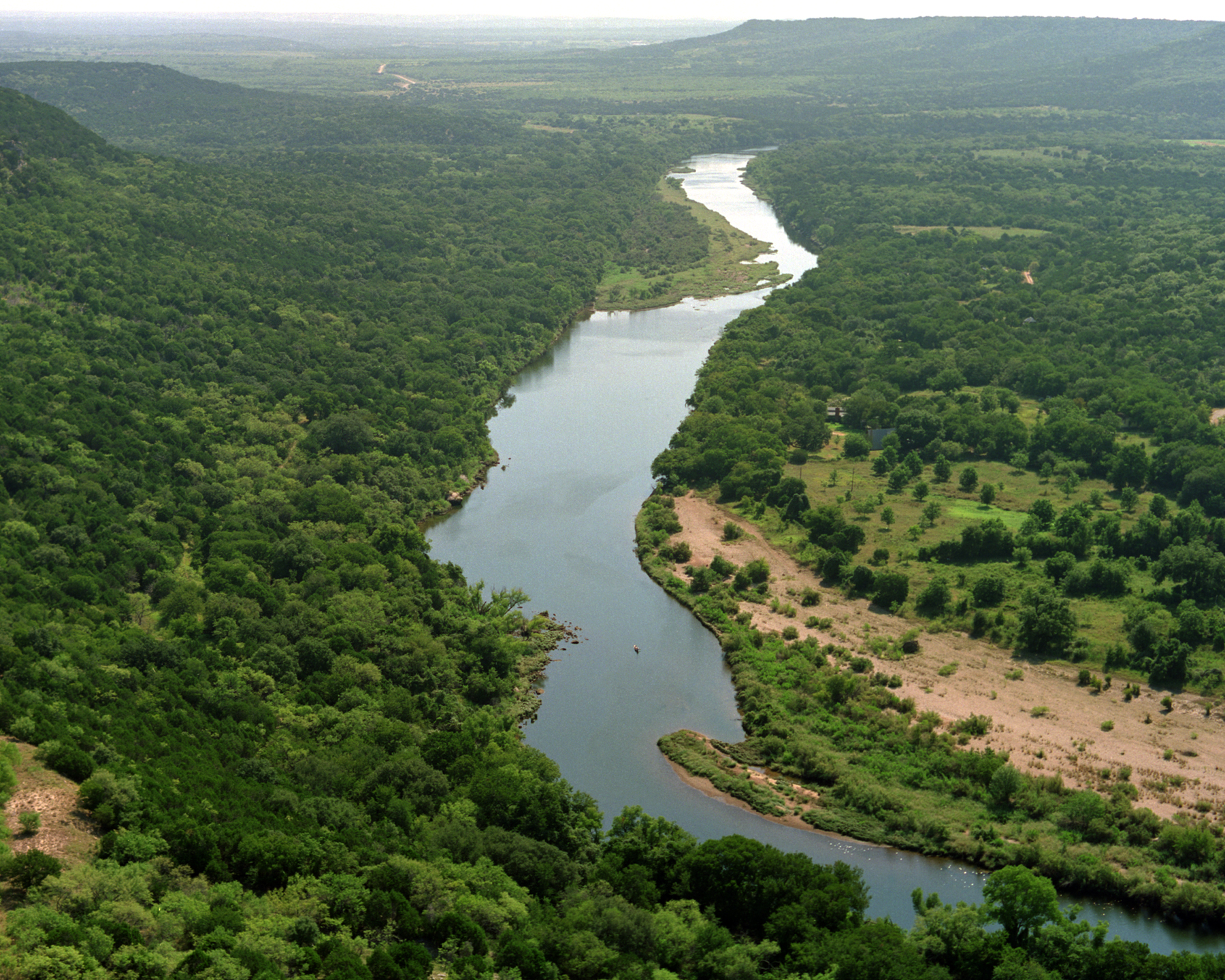
- Brazos River downstream of Possum Kingdom Lake, Palo Pinto County, Texas

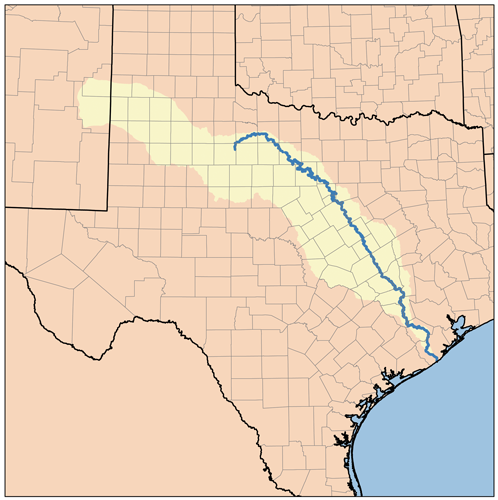
- Brazos River watershed

Location
- Country: United States
- State: Texas

Physical characteristics
- Source: Llano Estacado
- Source confluence: Stonewall County, Texas
  - coordinates: 33°16′07″N 100°0′37″W
  - elevation: 453 m (1,486 ft)
- Mouth: Gulf of Mexico
  - location: Brazosport, Brazoria County, Texas
  - coordinates: 28°52′33″N 95°22′42″W
  - elevation: 0 m (0 ft)
- Length: 1,352 km (840 mi)
- Basin size: 116,000 km^{2} (45,000 sq mi)
- Discharge
  - location: Freeport, Texas
  - average: 237.5 m^{3}/s (8,390 cu ft/s)
  - minimum: 0.76 m^{3}/s (27 cu ft/s)
  - maximum: 2,390 m^{3}/s (84,000 cu ft/s)

The Brazos River (/ˈbræzəs/ BRAZ-əs, Spanish: [ˈbɾasos]), called the Río de los Brazos de Dios (translated as "The River of the Arms of God") by early Spanish explorers, is the 14th-longest river in the United States at 1,280 miles (2,060 km) from its headwater source at the head of Blackwater Draw, Roosevelt County, New Mexico to its mouth at the Gulf of Mexico with a 45,000-square-mile (116,000 km^{2}) drainage basin.

The river is closely associated with Texas history, particularly the Austin settlement and Texas Revolution eras. Today major Texas institutions such as Baylor University and Texas A&M University are located close to the river's basin, as are parts of metropolitan Houston.

== Geography ==
The Brazos proper begins at the confluence of the Salt Fork and Double Mountain Fork, two tributaries of the Upper Brazos that rise on the high plains of the Llano Estacado, flowing 840 miles (1,350 km) southeast through the center of Texas. Another major tributary of the Upper Brazos is the Clear Fork Brazos River, which passes by Abilene and joins the main river near Graham. Important tributaries of the Lower Brazos include the Paluxy River, the Bosque River, the Little River, Yegua Creek, the Nolan River, the Leon River, the San Gabriel River, the Lampasas River, and the Navasota River.

Initially running east towards Dallas-Fort Worth, the Brazos turns south, passing through Waco and the Baylor University campus, further south to near Calvert, Texas, then past Bryan and College Station, then through Richmond, Texas, in Fort Bend County, and empties into the Gulf of Mexico in the marshes just south of Freeport.

The main stem of the Brazos is dammed in three places, all north of Waco, forming Possum Kingdom Lake, Lake Granbury, and Lake Whitney. Of these three, Granbury was the last to be completed, in 1969. When its construction was proposed in the mid-1950s, John Graves wrote the book Goodbye to a River. The Whitney Dam, located on the upper Brazos, provides hydroelectric power, flood control, and irrigation to enable efficient cotton growth in the river valley. A small municipal dam (Lake Brazos Dam) is near the downstream city limit of Waco at the end of the Baylor campus; it raises the level of the river through the city to form a town lake. This impoundment of the Brazos through Waco is locally called Lake Brazos. Nineteen major reservoirs are located along the Brazos.

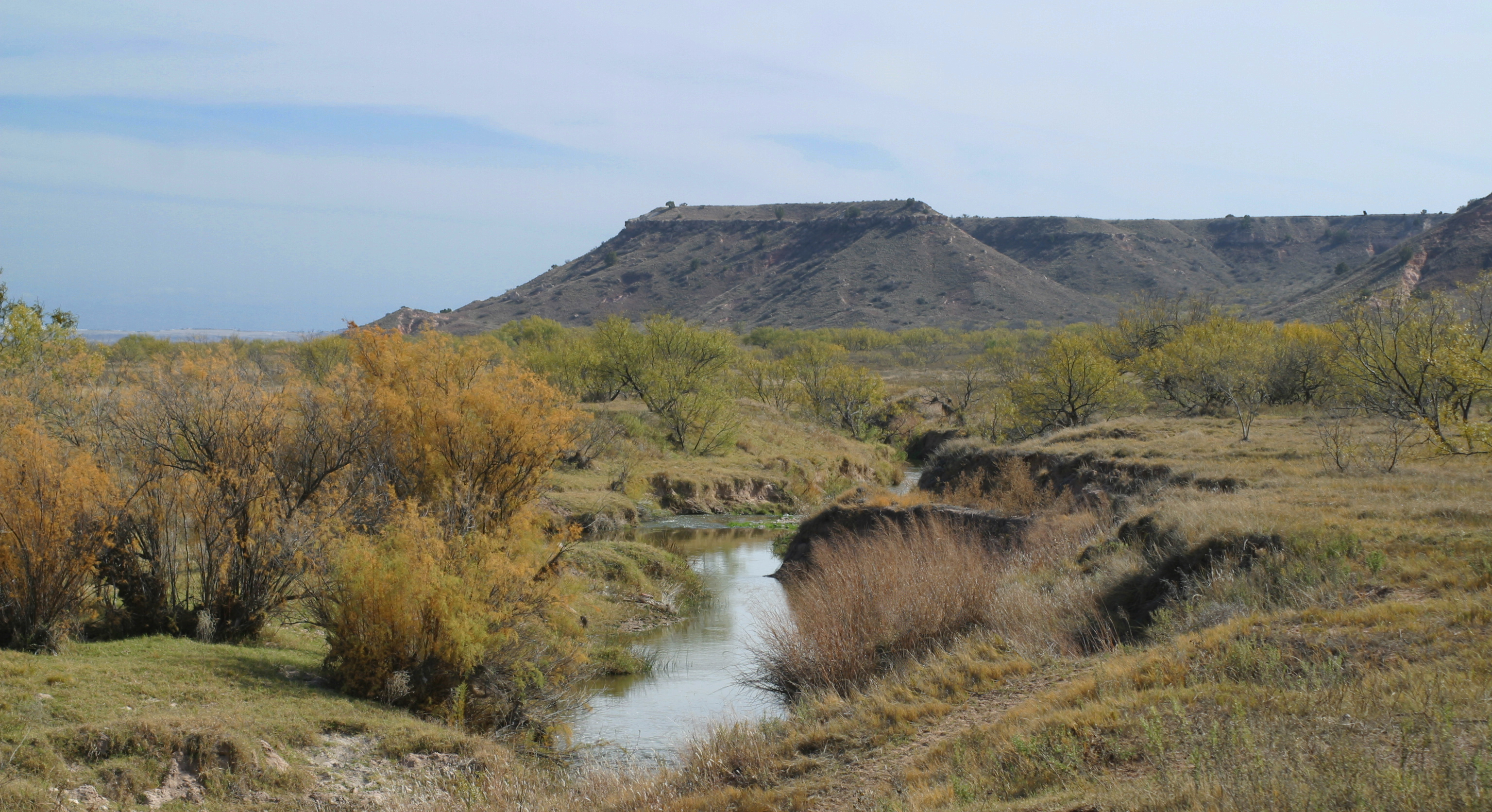
North Fork Double Mountain Fork Brazos River at the edge of the Llano Estacado

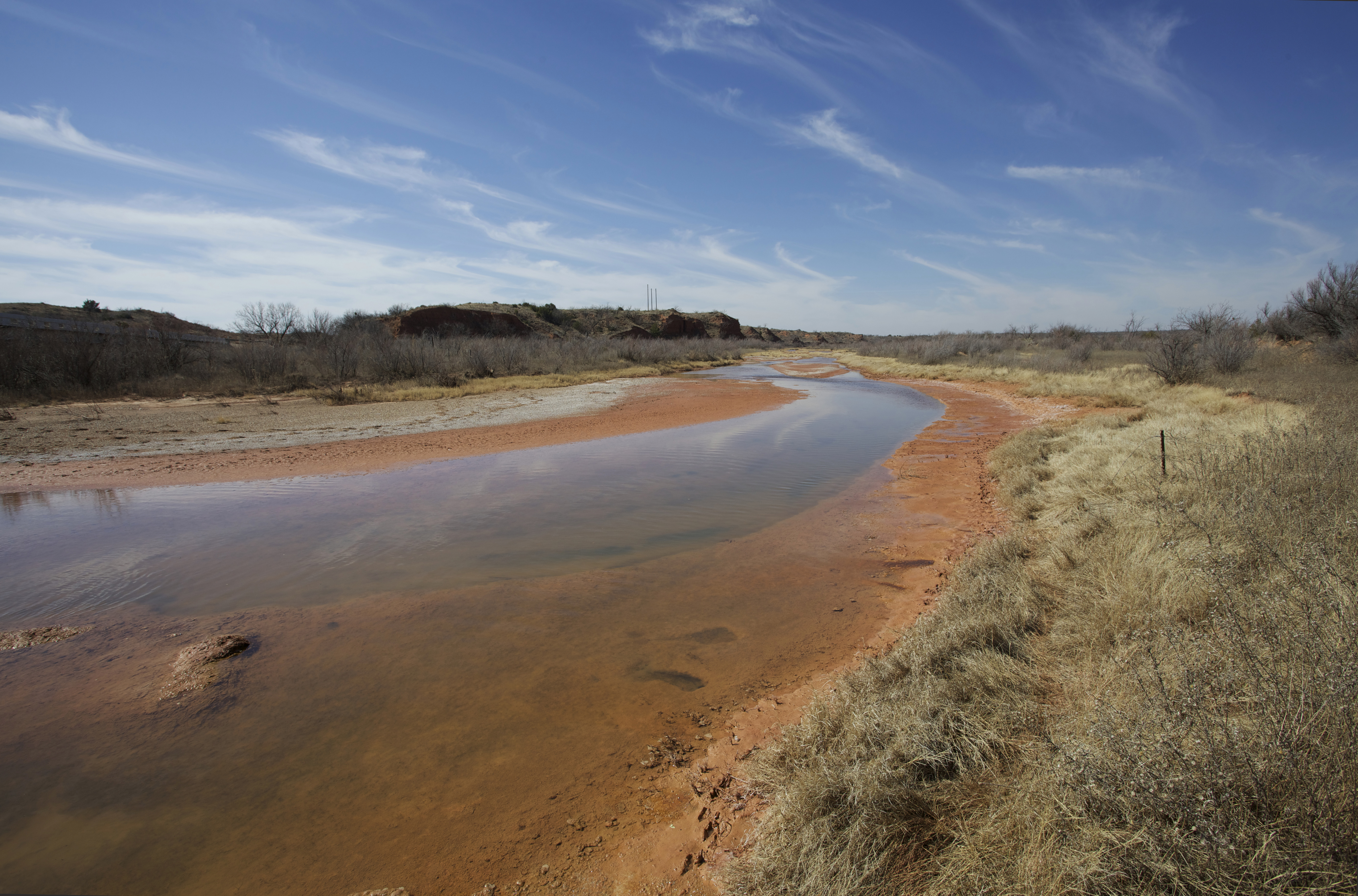
Salt Fork Brazos River in Kent County, Texas

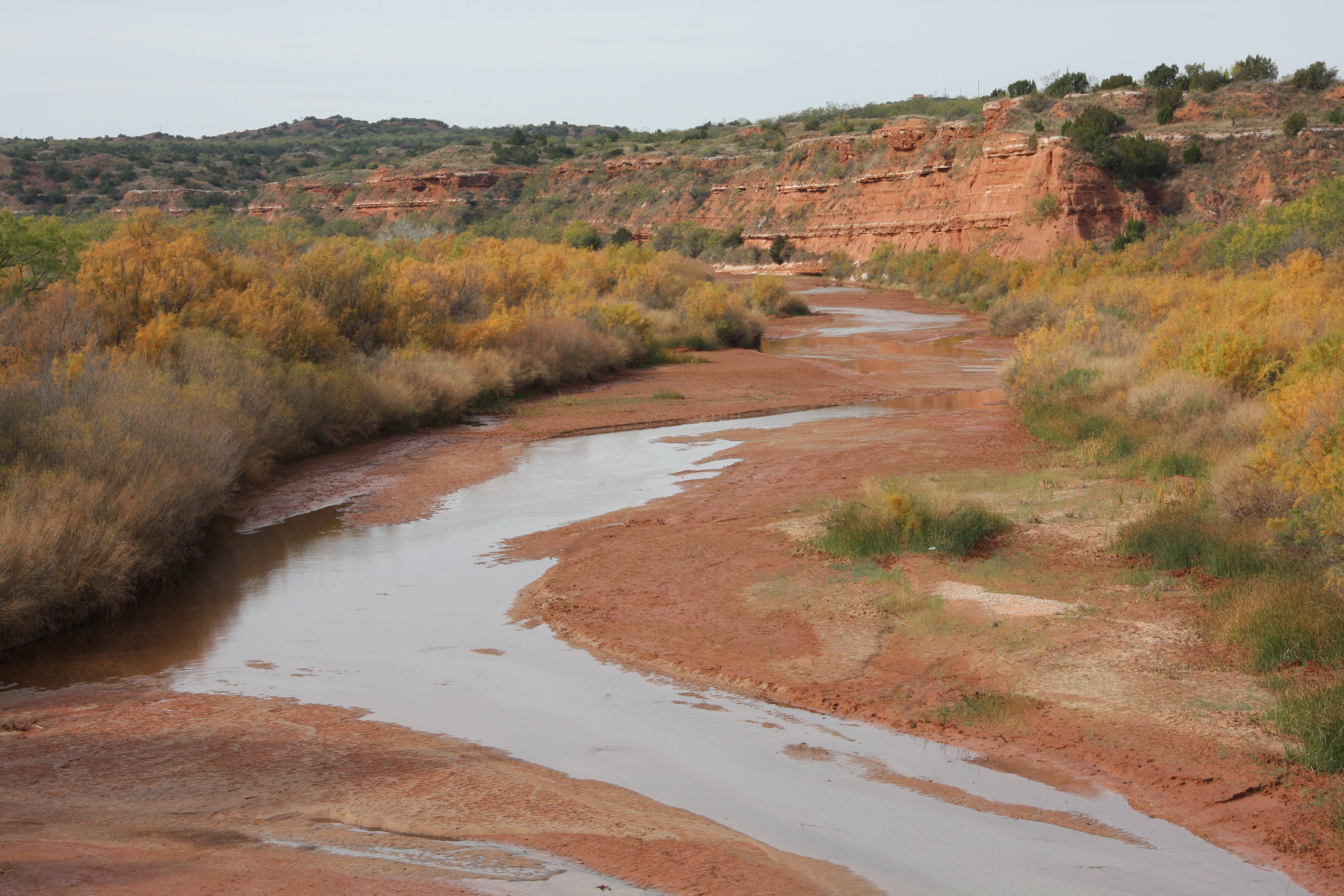
Double Mountain Fork Brazos River north of Rotan, Texas.

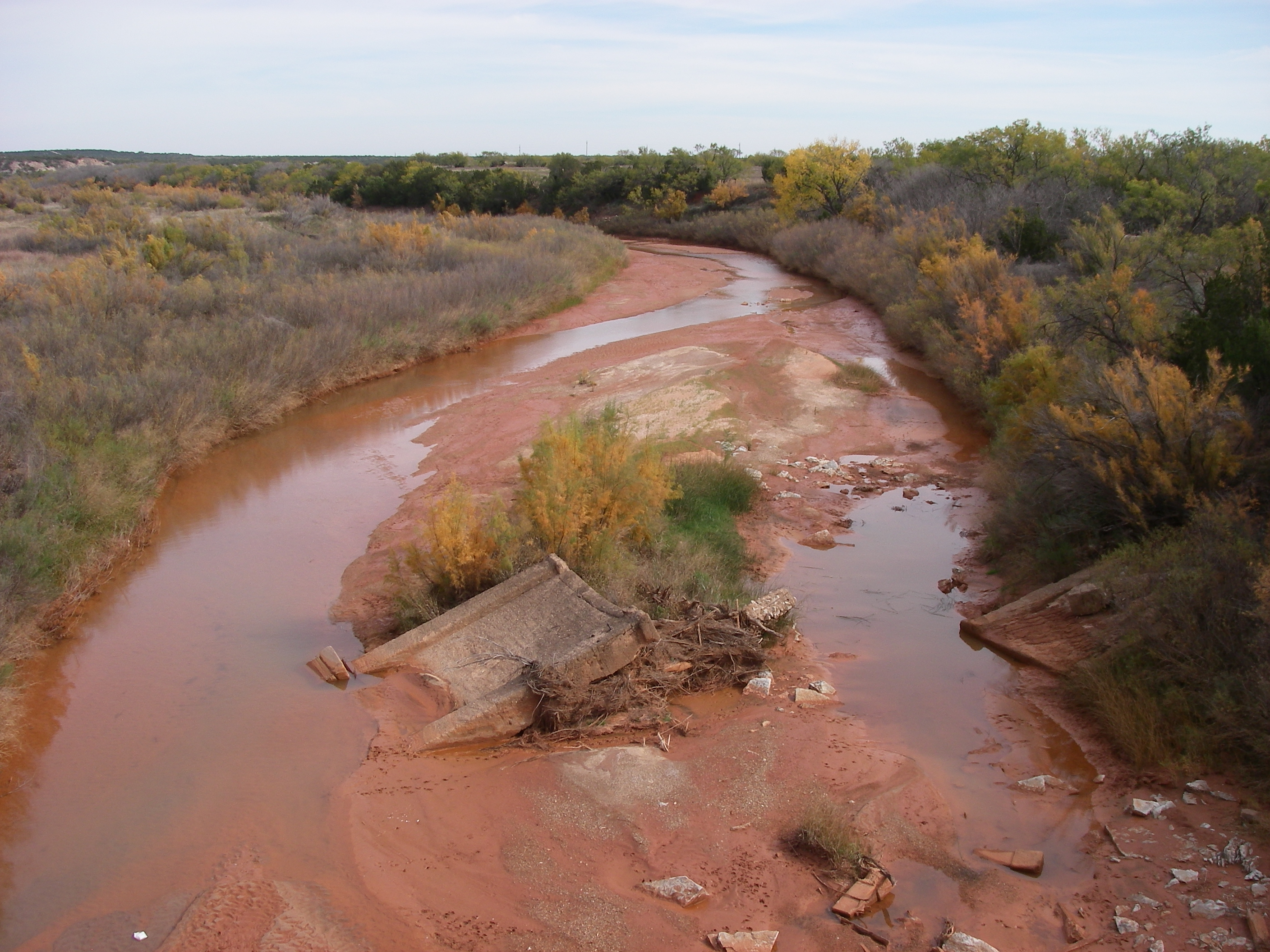
Double Mountain Fork Brazos River at the site of former Rath City, Texas

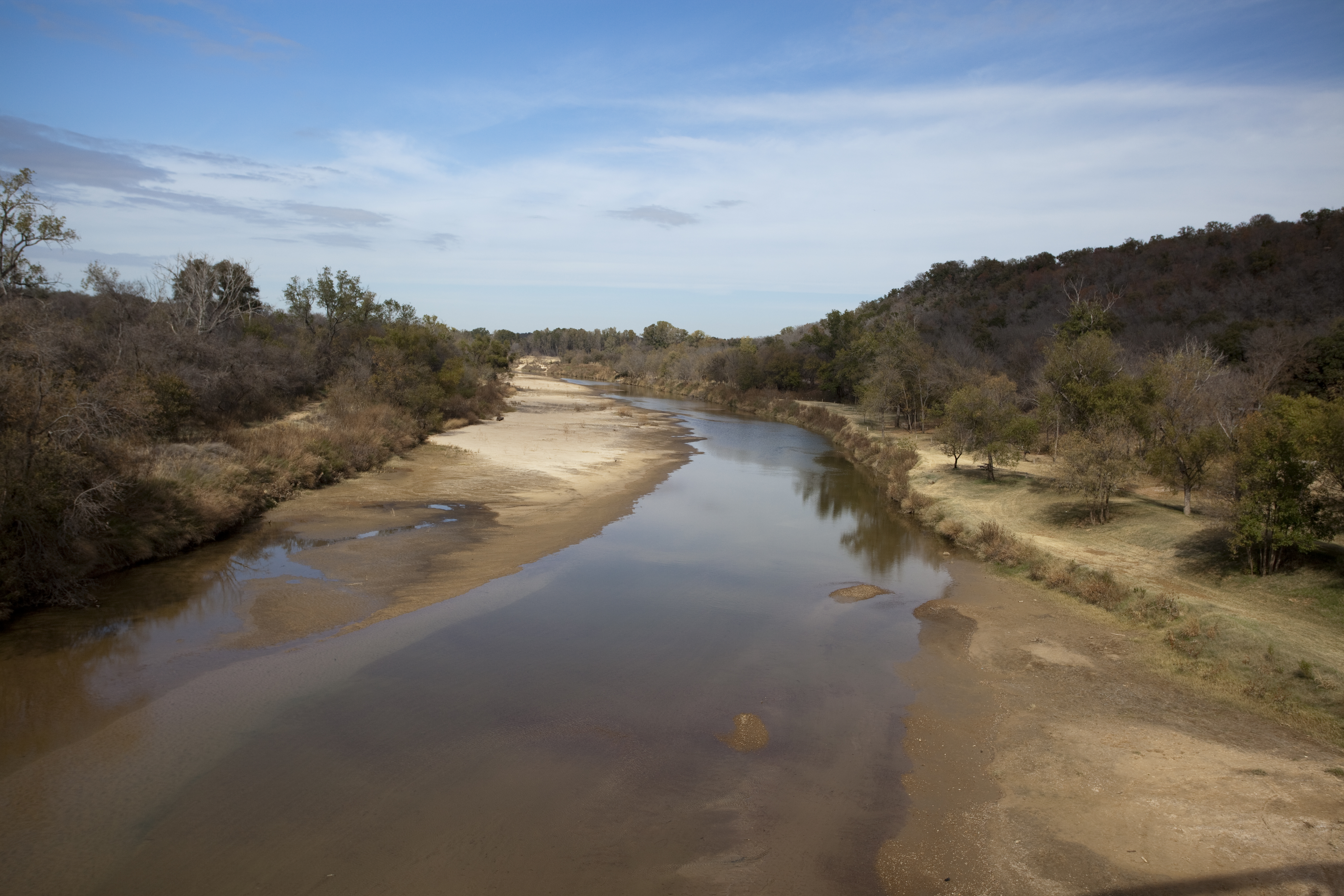
The Brazos in north Central Texas

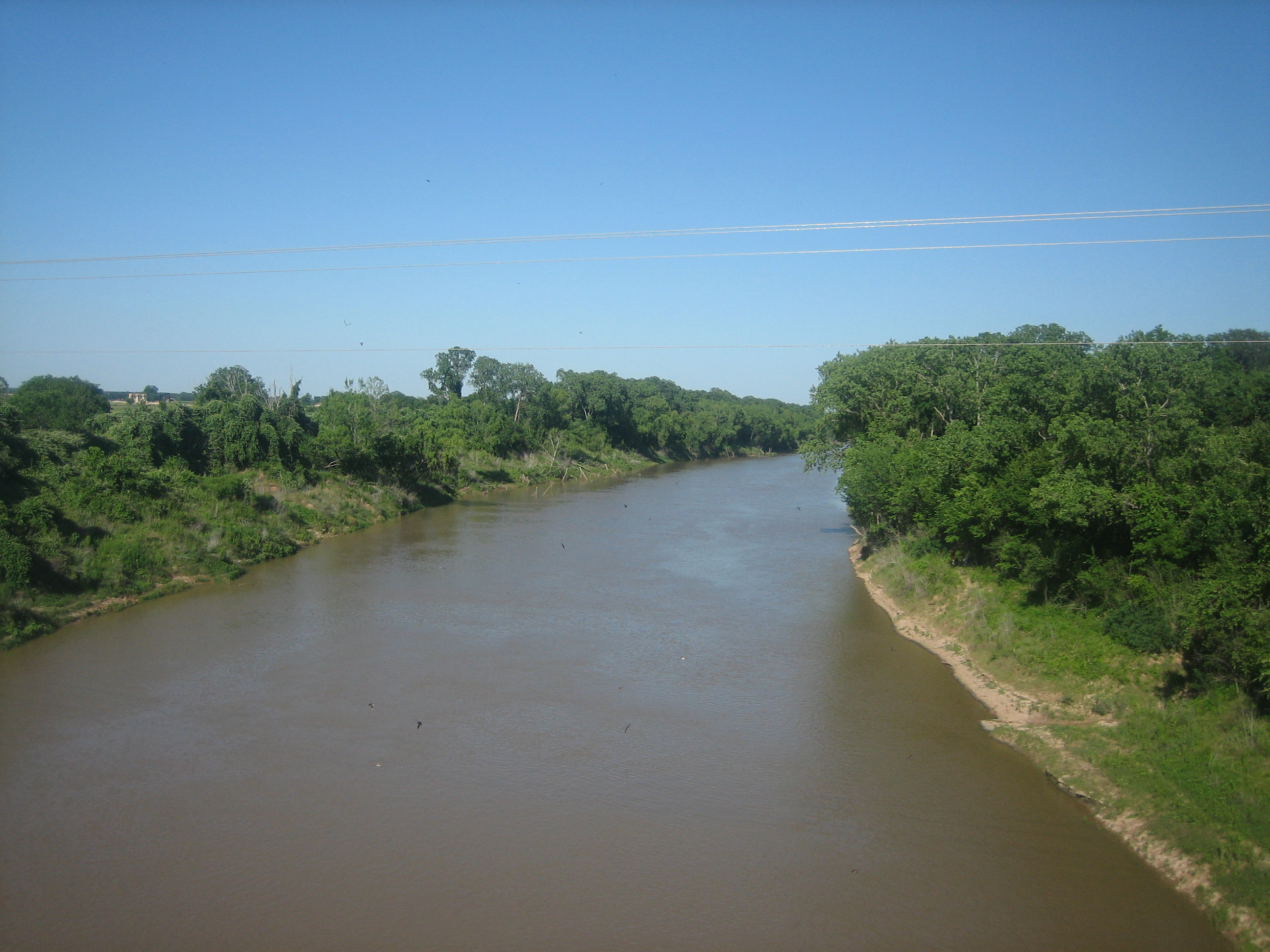
The Brazos in southeast Central Texas west of Bryan, Texas

== History ==
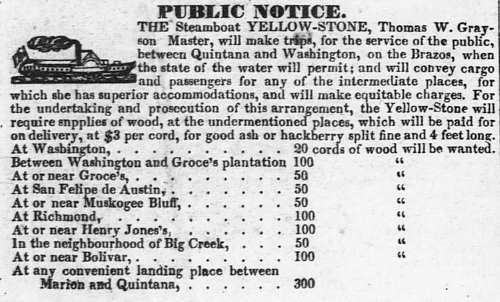
An advertisement for the steamboat Yellow Stone, December 1836. Packet service between Quintana and Washington, Republic of Texas.

It is unclear when the river was first named by European explorers, since it was often confused with the Colorado River not far to the south, but it was certainly seen by René-Robert Cavelier, Sieur de La Salle. Later Spanish accounts call it Los Brazos de Dios (the arms of God), for which name several different explanations were given, all involving it being the first water to be found by desperately thirsty parties.

The lower river valley of the Brazos River became one of the major Anglo-American settlement sites in Texas during the early 19th century. One of the first English-speaking colonies along the Brazos was founded by Stephen F. Austin at San Felipe de Austin in 1824. In 1836, Texas declared independence from Mexico at Washington-on-the-Brazos, a settlement in what is now Washington County that is known as "the birthplace of Texas". The Brazos River was also the scene of a battle between the Texas Navy and Mexican Navy during the Texas Revolution. The Texas Navy ship Independence was defeated by one Mexican vessel. In 1842, Indian commissioner of Texas, Ethan Stroud established a trading post on this river.

The river was important for navigation before and after the American Civil War, and steamboats sailed as far up the river as Washington-on-the-Brazos. While attempts to improve commercial navigation on the river continued, railroads proved more reliable. The Brazos River also flooded, often seriously, on a regular basis before a piecemeal levee system was replaced, notably in 1913 when a massive flood affected the course of the river. The river is primarily important today as a source of water for power, irrigation, and recreation. The water is administered by the Brazos River Authority.

The mouth of the river was diverted in 1929.

The 2000 book, Sandbars and Sternwheelers: Steam Navigation on the Brazos by Pamela A. Puryear and Nath Winfield Jr., with introduction by J. Milton Nance, examines the early vessels that attempted to navigate the Brazos.

On June 2, 2016, the rising of the river required evacuations for portions of Brazoria County.

== Watershed ==
The Brazos River watershed covers a total area of 46,013 sq mi (119,174 km^{2}). Within the watershed lie 42 lakes and rivers, which have a combined storage capacity of 2.5 million acre-feet. The Brazos watershed also has an estimated groundwater availability of 119,275 acre-feet per year. Around 31% of the land use within the watershed is cropland, and roughly 61% is grassland (30%), shrubland (19.8%), and forest (11%), while urban use only makes up 4.6%. The population density within the watershed is 50.5 people/sq mi (19.5/km^{2}).

== Water quality concerns ==
The main water-quality issues within the Brazos watershed are high nutrient loads, high bacterial and salinity levels, and low dissolved oxygen. These issues can be attributed to livestock waste, fertilizer, and chemical run offs. Sources of run off are croplands, pastures, and industrial sites, among others. The watershed receiving the most toxic pollution is the lower Brazos river, which received 33.4 million pounds of toxic waste in 2012.

== Recreation ==
Canoeing is a very popular recreational activity on the Brazos River, with many locations favorable for launching and recovery. The best paddling can be found immediately below Possum Kingdom Lake and Lake Granbury.

Sandbar camping is also permitted, since the entire streambed of the river is considered to be state-owned public property. Fishing, camping, and picnicking are legal here, including on the sandbars. The river and its three lakes are popular spots for avid anglers and boat enthusiasts due to the diverse ecosystems in the water and convenient marinas nearby such as The Cliffs Marina.

Several scout camps are located along the Brazos River, and they support a wide range of water and shoreline activities for scouts, youth groups, and family groups.

The Brazos River Authority maintains several public campsites along the river and at the lakes. Hunting is also permitted at select locations along the river. Fishing is permitted on all of the river, subject to regulations. Outdoor enthusiasts have the opportunity to view the area's scenery and the wildlife on the river. Fly fishing and river fishing for largemouth bass are common.

== Wildlife ==
Because the Brazos River empties into the Gulf of Mexico, the river is home to many animals. For example, the deltaic environment tend to attract shorebirds. The Brazos is also surrounded by forests and marshes, which attract and house more species of birds. Those include:

- heron and egret bird species,
- barred owls,
- purple gallinules,
- least bitterns,
- and prothonotary warblers.

Besides birds, other non-flying animals inhabit the Brazos river:

- American alligators,
- bobcats,
- white-tailed deer,
- raccoons,
- gray foxes,
- and feral hogs.

== See also ==
- Battle of the Brazos
- Blanco Canyon
- Brazoria, Texas
- Brazos Belle
- Brazosport Independent School District
- Canyon Valley, Texas
- Double Mountains (Texas)
- Double Mountain Fork Brazos River
- List of rivers of Texas
- List of longest rivers of the United States (by main stem)
- Mount Blanco
- North Fork Double Mountain Fork Brazos River
- USS Brazos (AO-4), a fleet oiler built in 1919
- White River (Texas)
- Yellow House Canyon
- Port Freeport
