= Stuart Gentling =

American visual artist and writer

- Born: December 31, 1942; Rochester, Minnesota
- Died: August 31, 2006 (aged 63); Fort Worth, Texas
- Education: Tulane University
- Known for: Visual arts, Writing
- Movement: Regionalism
- Family: Scott Gentling
- Patrons: Edward Bass, Trammel Crow, John Roach

Stuart Gentling (December 31, 1942 – August 31, 2006) was an American visual artist and writer, most known for his artistic collaborations with his twin brother, Scott Gentling. The pair derived inspiration from a wide range of shared interests including nature, history, and regional landscapes. Heavily influenced by John James Audubon, they co-authored Of Birds and Texas, a book of their artwork and commentary on Texan birds and landscapes. They are also known for designing the murals at the Bass Performance Hall, in Fort Worth, Texas.

== Early life ==
Stuart and his fraternal twin were born in Rochester, Minnesota, to Barbara Johnson, a trained social worker and Dr. Allen Gentling, an anesthesiologist. At the age of five, they moved with their family, including their older brother, Peter, and younger sister, Suzanne, to Fort Worth, Texas, where their father became Head of Anesthesiology at Harris Methodist Hospital. Suzanne was, later, instrumental in gathering and preserving the artists’ work and papers after their deaths.

From a young age, the twins gained a reputation for both their creativity and their neighborhood antics.

Idolizing William Faulkner, Stuart originally wanted to pursue his literary inclinations, and his interest in Southern landscapes and culture unfolded as short fiction. While he would sketch and draw as a child, he often had his brother finish his work because he felt that he lacked Scott's skills in painting. This collaborative process of Scott using Stuart's sketches and photographs as a base to create artwork continued throughout their lives. In their book Of Birds and Texas, Stuart recalls attempting to reproduce a wood duck he saw in Audubon's book at the library of the Fort Worth Children's Museum (now the Fort Worth Museum of Science and History) as a young teen; frustrated with his supposed poor skills in watercolors, he had Scott complete it, citing this piece as the beginning of their artistic careers.

The turbulent relationship between his mother and alcoholic father, which ended in divorce in 1962, further strengthened Stuart's bond with his twin during his childhood.

== Education ==
After graduating from Fort Worth's Arlington Heights High School in 1961, Stuart attended Tulane University along with Scott. While Scott soon transferred to the Pennsylvania Academy of the Fine Arts (PAFA), Stuart remained at Tulane to continue his studies in writing and graduated in 1965. He spent one semester at Texas Christian University where he studied under Texan writer John Graves, who later wrote an essay for their book Of Birds and Texas. During his senior year at Tulane, he rediscovered his passion for painting and became engrossed in the study of Hispanic culture in the Americas.

Stuart felt compelled to pursue a “practical” career after his time at Tulane and enrolled at the University of Texas School of Law. Realizing within the first week that he was not suited for a career in law, he decided to apply to PAFA. He received a draft notice during the Vietnam War, and the problem of maintaining student deferment delayed his move to Philadelphia. He spent this interval in Austin painting and learning Nahuatl at the university's library. Stuart arrived at PAFA in the fall of 1966, and in less than a year, dropped out to join his childhood friend, Tom Loffland, on a hunting trip to India.

The brief separation of the twins during their college years was difficult for them both, but this time apart allowed them to hone their crafts as individuals and engage with their respective stylistic role models. Crediting Scott as his real art teacher, Stuart ultimately returned to Fort Worth, where he based his artistic practice, and lived with Scott until his death.

== Career ==
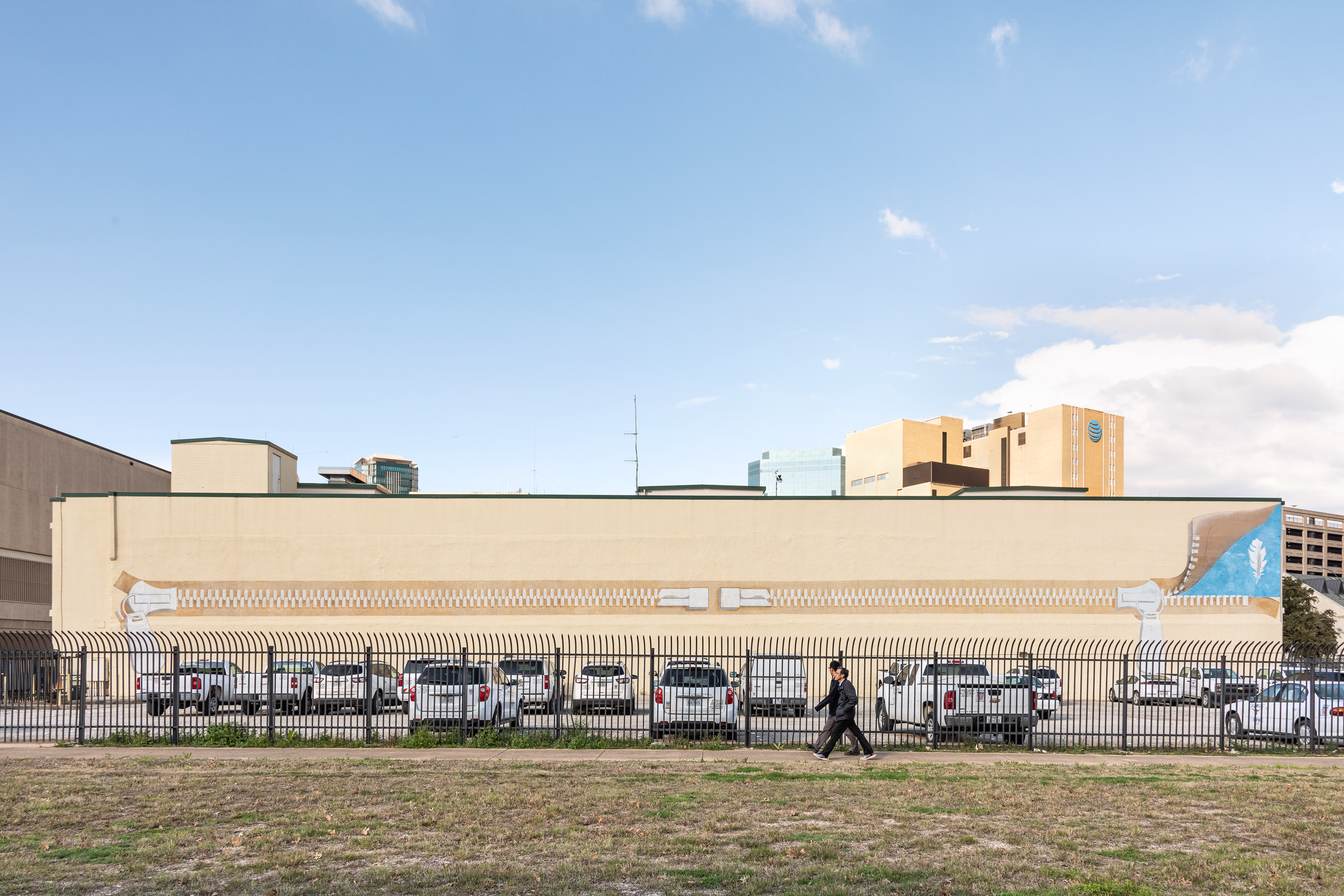
Zipper mural, 1975/2006, Mixed media

Stuart primarily worked in watercolors, pencil sketching, and photography. Both brothers struggled to break away from the label “realist”, and preferred the term “representational” when describing their work. Stuart was known for creating emotional intensity through his use of color in his work. The brothers also worked together on many pieces and were recognized for their unique creative partnership.

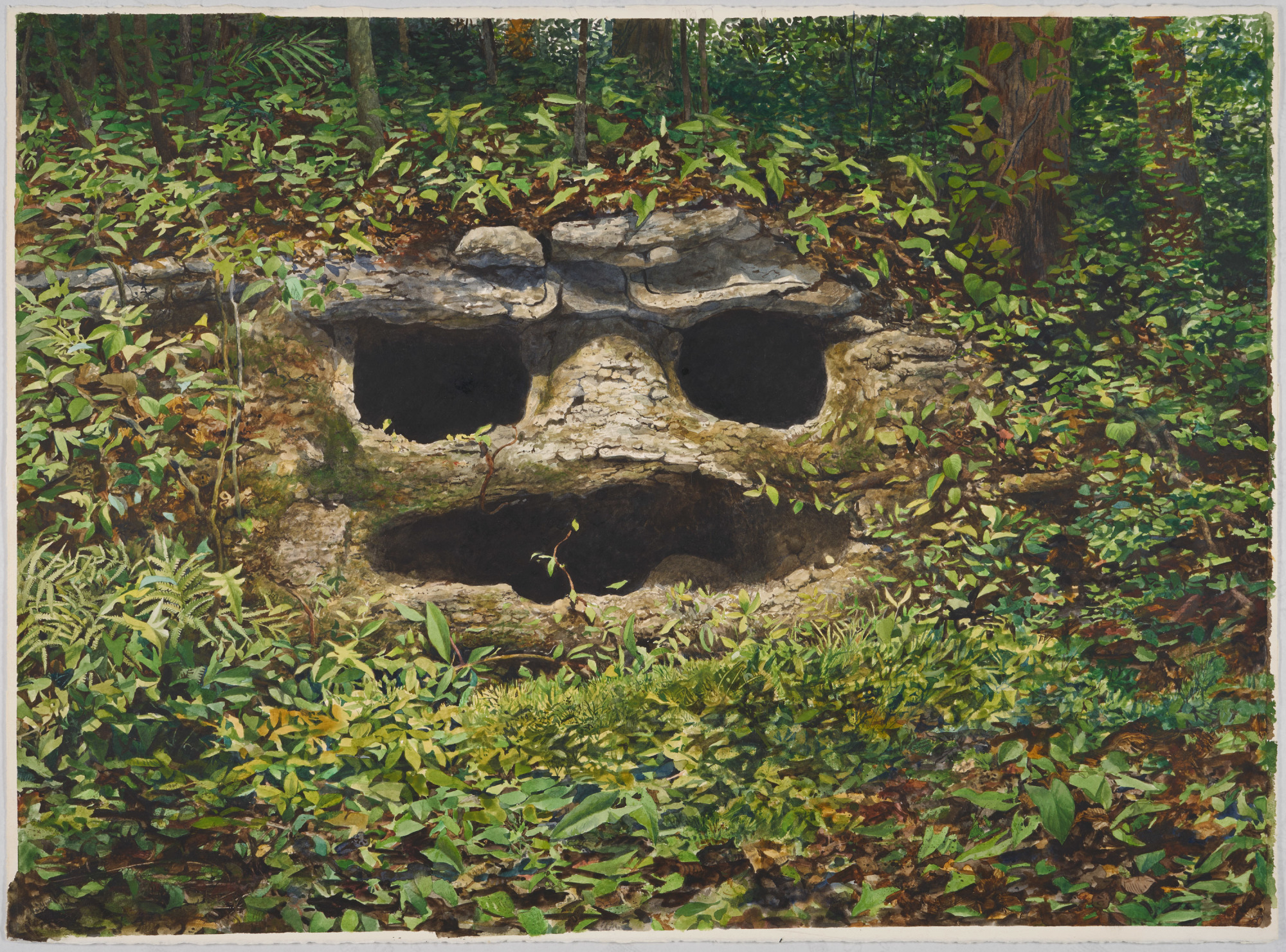
Rain God, ca. 1993

Stuart's first solo exhibition was hosted in late 1971 at the residence of art dealer and friend, Ralph Carr, in Fort Worth. It included his watercolors Apple Bushel and Onion Sprout, pencil sketches of birds, and tempera paintings Plum Blossoms and Dandelions. His work did not gain the same acclaim as Scott's, and he would often acknowledge his brother's superior talent. While Stuart was known for having a quicker hand than Scott, he has claimed to have spent longer hours on identifying and creating the right landscape to capture.

Through his social engagements and active involvement in community organizations, Stuart was asked to decorate ballrooms for Steeplechase debutante events, design posters for local fundraisers and membership drives (including the Fort Worth Mayfest), and create public art for city beautification; his zipper mural can still be seen today on Monroe Street in Fort Worth.

== Collections ==
Works by Stuart Gentling can be found in the permanent collections of the Amon Carter Museum of American Art, the Houston Museum of Natural Science and The Old Jail Art Center.

== Personal life ==
He was president of the Steeplechase social club, and was a board member of the Fort Worth Art Museum (now the Modern Art Museum of Fort Worth), Van Cliburn Foundation, InterCultura, the Fort Worth Zoo and more. He died from a heart attack at 63.
