= Scott Gentling =

American visual artist

- Born: December 31, 1942; Rochester, Minnesota
- Died: February 8, 2011 (aged 68); Fort Worth, Texas
- Education: Tulane University, Pennsylvania Academy of the Fine Arts
- Known for: Visual arts
- Movement: Regionalism
- Family: Stuart Gentling (brother)
- Patrons: Edward Bass, Trammel Crow, George W. Bush, John Roach, Jane Goodall

Scott Gentling (December 31, 1942 – February 8, 2011) was an American visual artist based in Fort Worth, Texas. While his work bordered on realism, he often rejected the term, and preferred to describe his work as representational. He was also known for his artistic collaborations with his fraternal twin, Stuart Gentling, including their book Of Birds and Texas, and the murals at the Bass Performance Hall, in Fort Worth, Texas. Scott and his twin's work drew inspiration from many common interests such as nature, history, and architecture.

== Early life ==
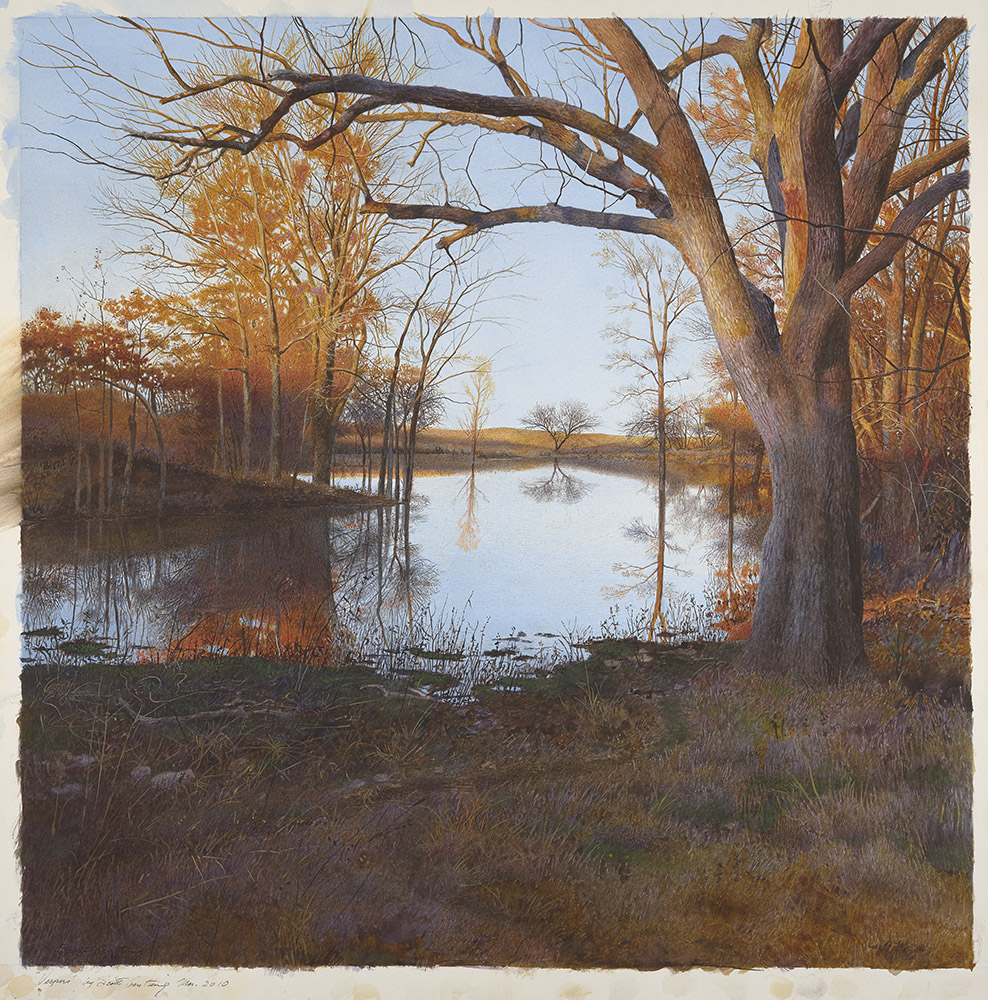
Vespers

Scott Gentling was born in Rochester, Minnesota, and moved to Fort Worth, Texas, at the age of five with his family. His mother, Barbara Johnson, was a trained social worker and his father, Dr. Allen Gentling worked as the Head of Anesthesiology at Harris Methodist Hospital. The twins grew up with an older brother, Peter, and younger sister, Suzanne. After Scott's death, Suzanne was crucially involved in preserving the twins’ works and documents.

Scott had a keen artistic eye as a child, and was often seen drawing things that intrigued him. The intellectual introvert demonstrated exceptional precision and attention to detail through his interest in making models of trains, ships, cityscapes and more; his fascination for miniaturization extended to making models of Aztec temples and cities in his adulthood, some of which are now housed at the Houston Museum of Natural Science. He initially considered a career in architecture, but by the time he graduated from Fort Worth's Arlington Heights High School, he had decided he wanted to be a professional artist.

Passionate and well-read about a wide range of subjects, both twins were considered “boy geniuses”. As children, they enjoyed copying bird paintings of John James Audubon, their artist-hero, and their love for painting birds later manifested in their book, Of Birds and Texas. They were also notorious in their neighborhood for their childhood escapades, many stemming from an obsession with flying.

== Education ==
In 1961, Scott enrolled at Tulane University along with Stuart; but, dissatisfied with the part-time format of their art program, he began researching full-time art schools. Emily Guthrie Smith, a Fort Worth artist and family friend, showed two of Scott's paintings to Walter Stuempfig, from the Pennsylvania Academy of the Fine Arts (PAFA), when he was in town for an exhibition of his work at the Fort Worth Art Museum. Impressed with Scott's paintings, Stuempfig urged PAFA to invite Scott to attend their institution.

Scott transferred to PAFA in the fall of 1962, while Stuart remained at Tulane. This brief time apart during their college years was challenging for the inseparable twins, but gave them the opportunity to pursue their interests and study under their respective stylistic role models. Scott trained in etching and printmaking with Morris Blackburn, and was profoundly influenced by the works of Edward Hopper. Under the tutelage of John W. McCoy in his second year at PAFA, he found himself drawn to drybrush watercolor, abandoning etching. Scott pursued themes of regionalism in his work much like his mentors and idols, such as John McCoy, John Chumley, Thomas Hart Benton, and Andrew Wyeth. Scott remained at PAFA until the winter of 1966.

== Career ==
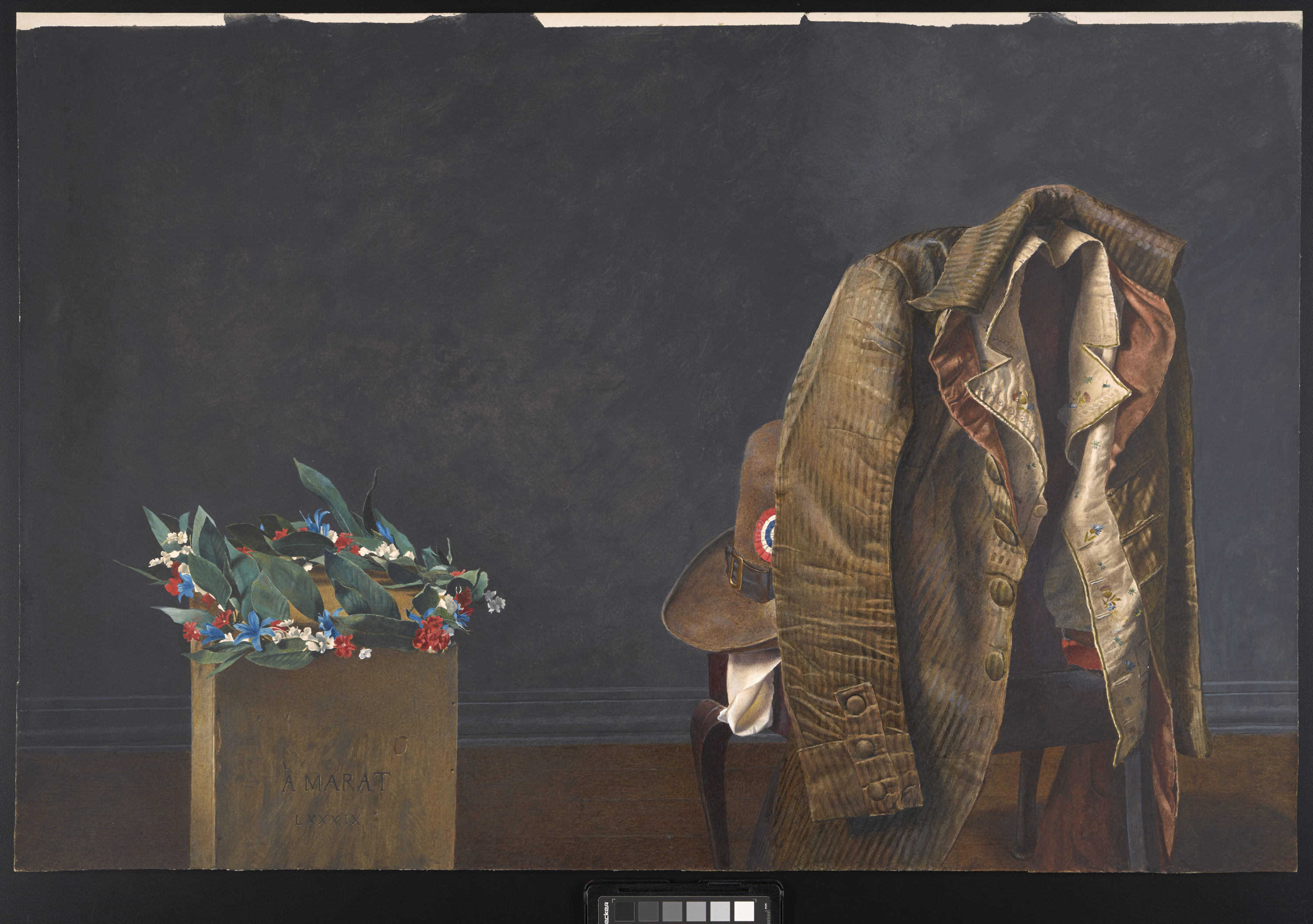
À Marat

Upon returning to Fort Worth from PAFA, Scott concentrated on landscapes, portraits and still lifes. He and Stuart often made road trips to the countryside and rural areas in search of inspiration. Scott's first solo exhibition was held in 1966, at the Valley House Gallery in Dallas, Texas, and attracted over 5,000 attendees in a single month - a gallery record. Though Scott saw early success in his career, much to his chagrin, he was often labeled a “realist” and compared with Andrew Wyeth. In interviews he would clarify that he preferred to classify his work as “representational” and that the moods of his paintings, where he aimed to capture compassion and humor, were “entirely different” from Wyeth's.

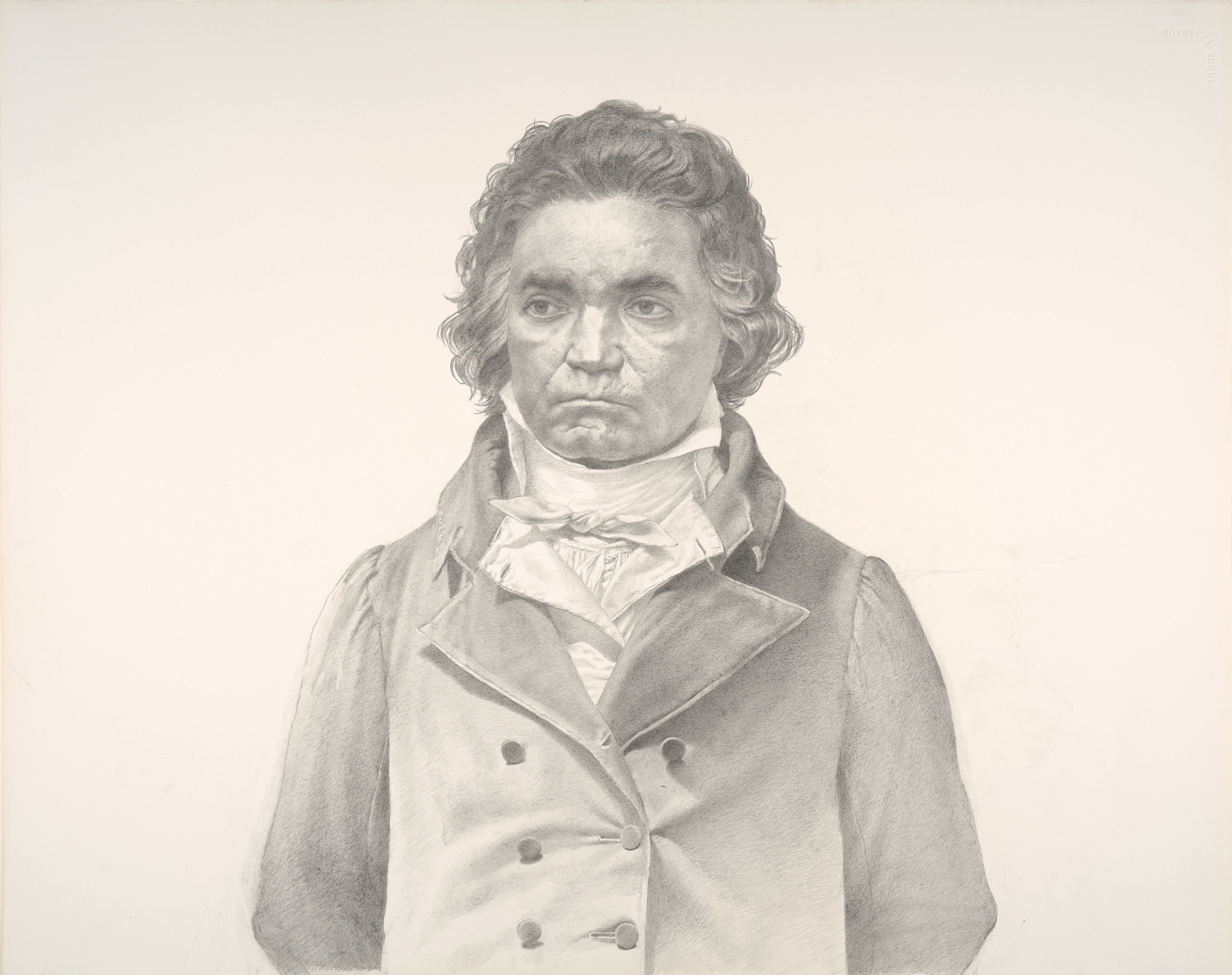
Scott Gentling, Ludwig van Beethoven

Recognizing the need to develop his own signature style, Gentling focused his work on life in the South, and captured the struggle “between the land and man”. Many of his landscape paintings were rooted in East Texas and Louisiana, where he depicted delta marshes, gravel paths, cypress brakes used in duck hunting, weather-beaten and abandoned houses, sharecroppers’ cabins and more. He set his portraiture and genre scenes in these same locations. Stuart did not receive as much acclaim as Scott, but was instrumental in managing both of their artistic careers through his vast social network. The brothers rekindled their love for birds and Audubon as adults, and Stuart was the driving force behind publishing and marketing their work in Of Birds and Texas.

As Scott's talent for portraiture also gained popularity, he was inundated with requests for commissions. Among the many portraits he has completed throughout his career are those of Trammell Crow (real estate magnate), John Roach (businessman and civic leader), George W. Bush (then Governor of Texas), Jane Goodall (primatologist), Amon G. Carter (newspaper publisher and oil investor), and Ruth Carter Stevenson (founder of the Amon Carter Museum of American Art). He sketched and painted classical composers and historical figures as well, like Ludwig van Beethoven. The brothers were avid collectors of various curios, and enjoyed creating still lifes of them. Scott painted 18th century costumes, musical instruments, Mesoamerican pottery, and more.

Gentling continued to pursue sculpture and model making through his fascination for Aztec history and culture; he combined his skills and scholarly research to produce drawings and models of cities and temples, which, as artistic interpretations, have been displayed at museums across the country, including the Houston Museum of Natural Science, the Denver Museum of Natural History, and the Los Angeles County Museum of Art (LACMA). His work can be found today at the Amon Carter Museum of American Art, Modern Art Museum of Fort Worth, Houston Museum of Natural Science, and The Old Jail Art Center.

== Personal life ==
Neither twin strived for national-level acclaim; they mostly directed their attention to their local patrons. Though Scott was invited to join a gallery in New York in the early 1970s, he declined the offer as he did not care much for the dominating New York art scene and preferred to work in Texas.

Scott lived a fairly ascetic life, engrossed in his artwork until his death. He left the responsibility of promoting artwork and managing their business to Stuart. He became more of a recluse after Stuart's death in 2006. Scott died a few weeks after suffering from a series of strokes shortly after his 69th birthday.
