= Brazos Belle =

Riverboat formerly docked in Waco, Texas

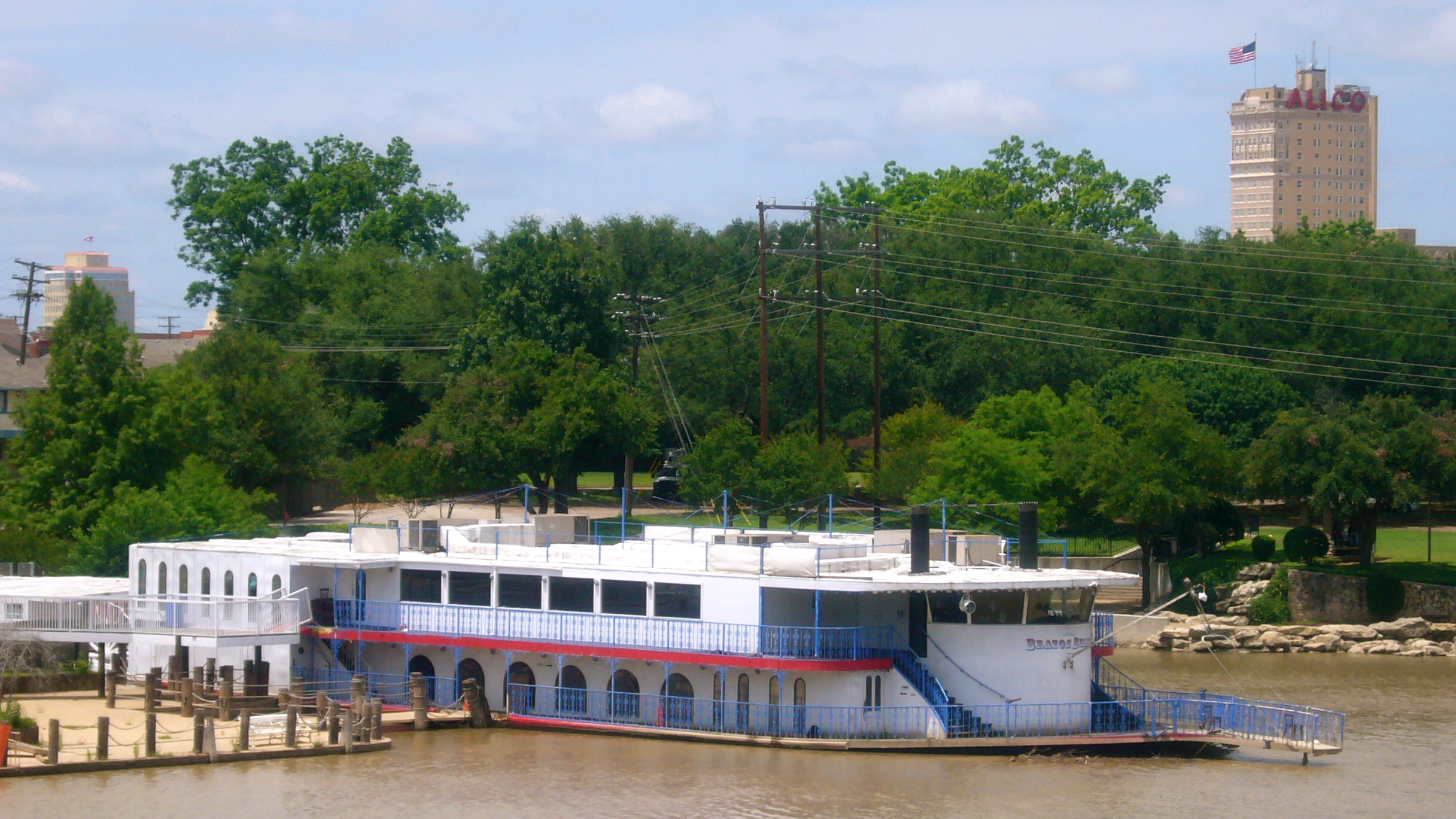
- Brazos Belle as seen from I-35 in 2008

History
- Name: Brazos Belle
- Namesake: the Brazos River
- Cost: $1,000,000
- Out of service: 1997
- Stricken: 2008
- Home port: Waco, Texas United States
- Fate: Scrapped

General characteristics
- Type: Sternwheel riverboat
- Length: 160 feet (49 m)

Brazos Belle was a 160-foot (49 m) American riverboat constructed for use on the Brazos River in Texas. Permanently docked in Waco, Texas as a restaurant in 1997, the Belle often hosted dinner parties, receptions, and functions for local Greek organizations. Flooding in 2007 badly damaged the boat; although the Belle was refloated, repairs proved uneconomical, and the Brazos Belle was scrapped late in 2008.

== History ==
Brazos Belle, originally named Brazos Queen II, was constructed by F.M. Young at a cost of $1 million, the vessel being permanently berthed on Lake Brazos, near Interstate 35 in Waco in 1997 as a result of fluctuating water levels in the Brazos River. Young sold the riverboat to Tony Cain, president of Brazos Leisure, Inc., in 2006. The Belle was a popular restaurant and tourist attraction in Waco, being used for banquets and wedding receptions, although it proved too large to be operated effectively on the river.

In 2006, low water levels on the Brazos River grounded the vessel, leading to it having to temporarily close and lose as much as $70,000 in revenue; in 2007, vandals broke into the boat four times in under two months.

== Flooding ==
On the morning of March 30, 2007, after heavy rains and flooding of the Brazos River, the bottom floor of the Belle filled up with eight feet of water, and the boat sunk at its moorings. The river, which a year before the flooding was so low it had the Belle sitting on dry ground, rose 26 feet in the week leading up to the flooding. Afterwards, the boat sat underwater until the city began cleanup in the spring of 2008. Several efforts by the city to contact the owners proved unsuccessful, with Cain first being unable to be found for comment for several weeks, then claiming to have returned title of the boat to Young, then declaring bankruptcy, assessing the damage to the Belle at $105,000.

== Attempted cleanup and scrapping ==
In order to recoup unpaid taxes, the city sold the Belle for $10,000 to local businessmen. The Belle's new owners raised the boat from the riverbottom and planned to move the vessel upstream for repairs. However, a lack of engines and expensive repairs that proved necessary before the vessel could be moved meant that the restoration of the vessel was economically unfeasible, and the Brazos Belle was sold for scrap, being broken up in late 2008.

== New Belle ==
As of 2011, a different riverboat named Brazos Belle operates from Belle's Landing in East Columbia, Texas, providing dinner tours on the Brazos River. It is claimed to be the first riverboat to sail the Brazos River in 150 years. It made its first voyage on July 31, 2011.
