= Ethan Stroud =

Texan Official

Ethan A. Stroud (1788–1846) was the Indian Commissioner on the Texas frontier, circa 1842. Stroud established an Indian Trading post on the Brazos River.
