= Goodbye to a River =

1960 book by John Graves

- Author: John Graves
- Illustrator: Russell Waterhouse
- Language: English
- Publisher: Alfred A. Knopf
- Publication date: 1960
- Pages: 306
- OCLC: 478781
- Dewey Decimal: 917.641

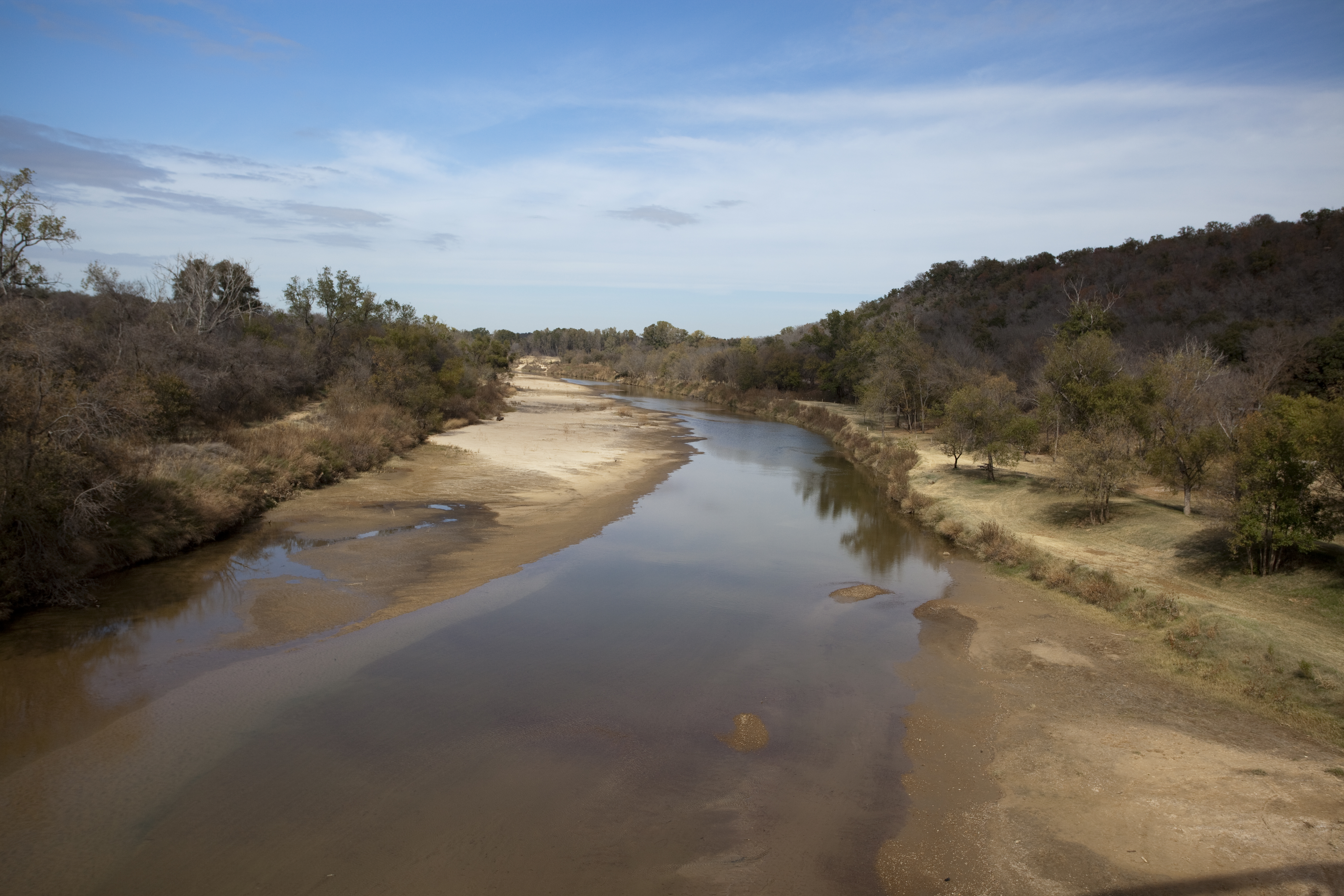
Brazos River in North Central Texas.

Goodbye to a River is a book by John Graves, published in 1960. It is a "semi-historical" account of a canoe trip made by the author during the fall of 1957 down a stretch of the Brazos River in North Central Texas, between Possum Kingdom Dam and Lake Whitney. The book presents both the author's account of the trip itself and numerous stories about the history and settlement of the area around the river and of North Central Texas. The title refers to Graves' childhood association with the river and the country surrounding it, and his fear of the "drowning" effect that a proposed series of flood-control dams (most notably, Lake Granbury) would have on the river.

Only three of the dams were built on the river, but at one time up to thirteen were proposed at various locations along its course to the Gulf of Mexico. The success of Goodbye to a River has been cited as a reason that the proposed dams were never built.

The book is acclaimed as a work of both conservationism and history and has been compared to Walden by Henry David Thoreau.
