= John Graves (author) =

American writer

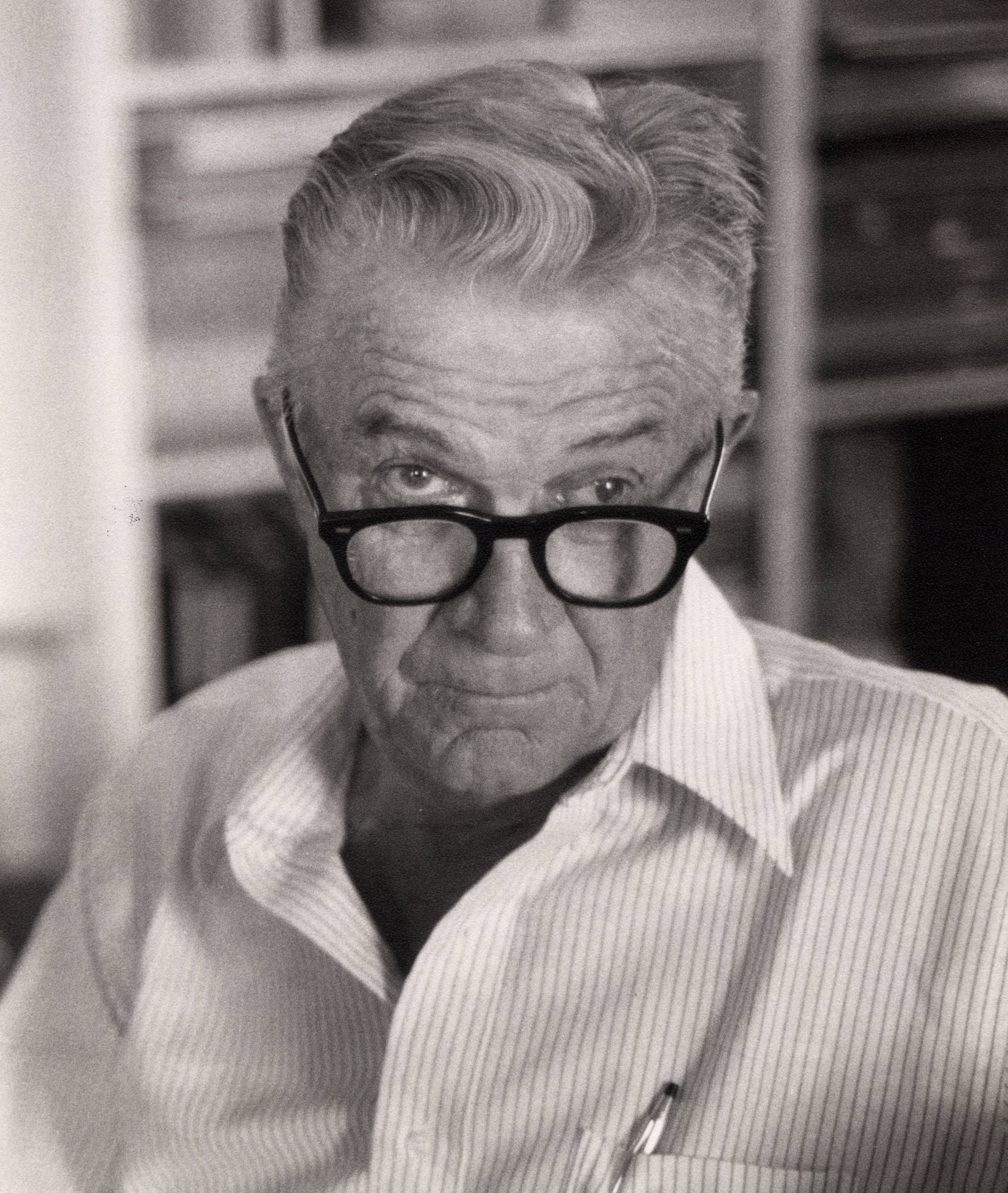
- John Graves
- Born: August 6, 1920; Fort Worth, Texas, U.S.
- Died: July 31, 2013 (aged 92); Glen Rose, Texas, U.S.
- Occupation: writer
- Known for: Goodbye to a River

John Alexander Graves III (August 6, 1920 – July 31, 2013) was an American writer known for his book Goodbye to a River.

== Biography ==
=== Early life ===
As a child growing up in Fort Worth and at his grandfather's ranch in Cuero, Graves was keenly interested in the landscape around him. He graduated from Rice Institute (now Rice University) in 1942. He subsequently served as a captain in the Marine Corps during World War II, until being wounded by a Japanese grenade on the island of Saipan. After the war, he went to graduate school at Columbia University, receiving his master's degree in 1948. While still at Columbia, in 1947, he published the short story "Quarry" in The New Yorker; he continued to publish fiction in magazines through the 1950s.

=== Adult life ===
Following an early marriage and divorce, he traveled widely, spending considerable time in Spain and the Canary Islands, but returned to Texas in 1957 to care for his father, who was gravely ill. According to the Southwestern Writers Collection, which holds many of Graves's papers, "In November of that year, Graves completed a three-week canoe trip down part of the Brazos River that he feared was about to be changed forever by dams. His narrative chronicle of the trip was first published as a magazine article in Holiday, and later Graves added history, philosophy and folklore which resulted in his first major book, Goodbye to a River (1960). The book attracted national attention and critical praise for its original style. It won the Carr P. Collins Award of the Texas Institute of Letters in 1961 and was nominated for a National Book Award that year."

In 1970, Graves and his family moved onto a property near Glen Rose, Texas that Graves had named Hard Scrabble. His writing about the farm and country life continued, with Hard Scrabble: Observations on a Patch of Land, published in 1974, and From a Limestone Ledge (1980). The latter, which collected essays that Graves had published in Texas Monthly magazine, was also nominated for a National Book Award.

Graves continued to write about the environment and about Texas. On July 31, 2013, he died at his home near Glen Rose, Texas, at the age of 92.

== Archival sources ==
- The John Graves Papers 1920-2006 (49 linear feet) are housed at the Wittliff Collections, Texas State University in San Marcos.
