= Penelope (disambiguation) =

Penelope is the faithful wife of Odysseus in Homer's epic poem Odyssey.

Penelope may also refer to:

== People ==
- Penelope (mother of Pan), mother of the god Pan in Greek mythology
- Penelope (given name), any of several people and fictional characters
- Julia Penelope (1941–2013), American linguist, author and philosopher

== Places ==
- Penelope, Texas, a town in the United States
- Penelope Point, Victoria Land, Antarctica
- 201 Penelope, an asteroid
- Penelope (crater), on Saturn's moon Tethys

== Plays ==
- La Penelope, c. 1580, by Giambattista della Porta
- Penelope (Maugham play) 1912 by Somerset Maugham
- Penelope (Enda Walsh play), a 2010 tragicomedy
- Penelope, or How the Odyssey was Really Written, 2022 musical by Peter Kellogg and Stephen Weiner

== Film and television ==
- Penelope (1966 film), starring Natalie Wood
- Penelope (2006 film), starring Christina Ricci
- "Penelope", an episode of the third season of Criminal Minds
- Penelope, a 2024 American television show on Netflix

== Music ==
- The Penelopes, an indie pop/electronic band from Paris

=== Opera ===
- Penelope, a German-language opera by Rolf Liebermann
- Pénélope (Fauré), an opera by Gabriel Fauré, first performed in 1913
- Pénélope (Piccinni), an opera performed in 1785

=== Songs ===
- "Penelope" (Pinback song)
- "Penelope", a song by Great Big Sea from the album Sea of No Cares
- "Penélope", a song by Joan Manuel Serrat
- "Pénélope", a song by Georges Brassens
- "Penelope", a song cycle by Sarah Kirkland Snider

== Ships ==
- HMS Penelope, any of several Royal Navy ships
- Hired armed cutter Penelope, in Royal Navy service from 1794 to 1799
- French frigate Pénélope (1806)
- SS Penelope, any of several steamships with this name

== Other uses ==
- Penelope (bird), a bird genus in the family Cracidae
- Penelope (e-mail client), e-mail software now named Eudora OSE
- Penelope brand of embroidery materials
- Penelope (horse) (1798–1824), thoroughbred racehorse and broodmare
- Penelope (platypus), a platypus who escaped from the Bronx Zoo in 1957
- Prix Penelope, a thoroughbred horse race in France
- Penelope High School, Texas, United States
- "Penelope", the name given to Molly Bloom's Soliloquy in the James Joyce novel Ulysses
- Penelopeia Urb., a genus of Cucurbitaceae
