= National Register of Historic Places listings in Hill County, Texas =

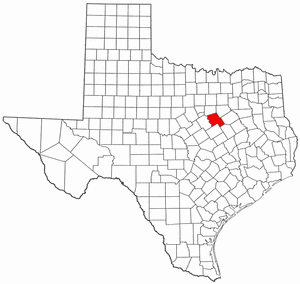
Location of Hill County in Texas

This is a list of the National Register of Historic Places listings in Hill County, Texas.

This is intended to be a complete list of properties and districts listed on the National Register of Historic Places in Hill County, Texas. There are one district and 22 individual properties listed on the National Register in the county. Eight individually listed properties are Recorded Texas Historic Landmarks including one that is also a State Antiquities Landmark. The district contains several more Recorded Texas Historic Landmarks.

This National Park Service list is complete through NPS recent listings posted March 21, 2025.

== Current listings ==
The publicly disclosed locations of National Register properties and districts may be seen in a mapping service provided.

	Name on the Register	Image	Date listed	Location	City or town	Description
1	J. T. Baker Farmstead		March 17, 1992 (#92000138)	1.2 mi (1.9 km). N of Blum between TX 174 and the Nolan R. 32°09′30″N 97°23′18″W	Blum	Recorded Texas Historic Landmark
2	Bear Creek Shelter Site	Bear Creek Shelter Site	October 19, 1978 (#78002955)	Address restricted	Huron	
3	Buzzard Cave	Buzzard Cave	July 18, 1974 (#74002270)	Address restricted	Lake Whitney	
4	Farmers National Bank	Farmers National Bank	March 30, 1984 (#84001871)	68 W. Elm St. 32°00′37″N 97°07′51″W	Hillsboro	Recorded Texas Historic Landmark
5	Gebhardt Bakery	Gebhardt Bakery	March 30, 1984 (#84001873)	119 E. Franklin St. 32°00′42″N 97°07′44″W	Hillsboro	Recorded Texas Historic Landmark
6	Grimes Garage	Grimes Garage	March 30, 1984 (#84001875)	110 N. Waco St. 32°00′44″N 97°07′47″W	Hillsboro	
7	Grimes House	Grimes House	March 30, 1984 (#84001877)	Country Club Rd. and Corporation St. 32°00′46″N 97°06′51″W	Hillsboro	
8	Hill County Courthouse	Hill County Courthouse	June 21, 1971 (#71000939)	Courthouse Sq. 32°00′40″N 97°07′50″W	Hillsboro	Recorded Texas Historic Landmark
9	Hill County Jail	Hill County Jail	May 28, 1981 (#81000631)	N. Waco St. 32°00′51″N 97°07′46″W	Hillsboro	Recorded Texas Historic Landmark
10	Hillsboro Cotton Mills		March 30, 1984 (#84001878)	220 N. Houston St. 32°00′46″N 97°08′05″W	Hillsboro	Demolished
11	Hillsboro Residential Historic District	Hillsboro Residential Historic District	July 9, 1984 (#84001879)	Roughly bounded by Country Club Rd., Thompson, Corsicana, Pleasant, Franklin, and Elm Sts. 32°00′46″N 97°07′14″W	Hillsboro	Includes multiple Recorded Texas Historic Landmarks
12	Kyle Shelter	Kyle Shelter	July 9, 1974 (#74002078)	Address restricted	Lake Whitney Estates	
13	McKenzie Site	McKenzie Site	November 25, 1977 (#77001451)	Address restricted	Hillsboro	
14	Missouri-Kansas-Texas Company Railroad Station	Missouri-Kansas-Texas Company Railroad Station	December 19, 1979 (#79002978)	Covington St. 32°00′46″N 97°07′52″W	Hillsboro	State Antiquities Landmark, Recorded Texas Historic Landmark
15	Nolan River Bridge 303-A of the Gulf, Colorado and Santa Fe Railway	Nolan River Bridge 303-A of the Gulf, Colorado and Santa Fe Railway	December 4, 2012 (#12001001)	Cty. Rd. 1127 at Nolan R. 32°08′50″N 97°23′49″W	Blum	
16	Old Rock Saloon	Old Rock Saloon	March 30, 1984 (#84001881)	58 W. Elm St. 32°00′37″N 97°07′49″W	Hillsboro	
17	Pictograph Cave	Pictograph Cave	March 13, 1974 (#74002079)	Address restricted	Lake Whitney	
18	Sheep Cave	Sheep Cave	July 9, 1974 (#74002077)	Address restricted	Blum	
19	Sturgis National Bank	Sturgis National Bank	March 30, 1984 (#84001889)	S. Waco and W. Elm Sts. 32°00′37″N 97°07′48″W	Hillsboro	
20	Tarlton Building	Tarlton Building	March 30, 1984 (#84001892)	110 E. Franklin St. 32°00′41″N 97°07′44″W	Hillsboro	
21	Joe E. Turner House	Joe E. Turner House	April 13, 1977 (#77001452)	3 mi (4.8 km). E of Itasca on SR 934; 32°10′22″N 97°05′30″W	Itasca	Recorded Texas Historic Landmark
22	U.S. Post Office	U.S. Post Office	March 30, 1984 (#84001894)	118 S. Waco St. 32°00′35″N 97°07′48″W	Hillsboro	Recorded Texas Historic Landmark
23	Western Union Building	Western Union Building	March 30, 1984 (#84001896)	107 S. Covington St. 32°00′42″N 97°07′44″W	Hillsboro	

== See also ==
- National Register of Historic Places listings in Texas
- Recorded Texas Historic Landmarks in Hill County
