= Abbott School =

Abbott School may refer to:

- The Abbott School, a school on the grounds of the Abbott House orphanage in Irvington, New York
- Abbott Street School, in Worcester, Massachusetts
- Abbott Middle School, in Elgin, Illinois
- Abbott High School, in Abbott, Texas
  - Abbott Independent School District, in Abbott, Texas
- Henry Abbott Technical High School, in Danbury, Connecticut
- Abbott District, a special type of school district in the state of New Jersey
