= Jim Joseph Carmichall =

American politician (1930–2007)

Member of the Texas House of Representatives from the 54th district
- In office January 13, 1953 – January 8, 1957
- Preceded by: W. Boone Fields
- Succeeded by: Bob Bullock

Hill County Commission

Personal details
- Born: February 27, 1930 Blum, Texas, U.S.
- Died: April 24, 2007 (aged 77) Hillsboro, Texas, U.S.
- Party: Democratic
- Spouse: June Overton (m. 1954)
- Education: Hill College; University of North Texas; Baylor University
- Occupation: real estate broker, politician

Jim Joseph Carmichall (February 27, 1930 – April 24, 2007), also known as Jimmie Joe Carmichall, was a Texas politician who served in the Texas House of Representatives from the 54th district.

== Personal life ==
Jim Joseph Carmichall was born on February 27, 1930, to Joseph Ernest and Anna Lee Coody Carmichall in Blum, Texas. He graduated from Blum High School, and later attended Hill College, University of North Texas, and Baylor University. He married June Overton in 1954. Carmichall was a member of First Baptist Church in Hillsboro, Texas. Carmichall was a real estate broker. June Overton Carmichall died on June 25, 2016.

=== Death ===
On April 24, 2007, Carmichall died at his home in Hillsboro, Texas. His funeral services were held on April 26, 2007, at the First Baptist Church in Hillsboro, and officiated by Rev. Kenneth James and Dr. Howard Daniel. He was 77 years old.

== Political career ==
Carmichall served in the Texas House of Representatives for district 54 during the 53rd and 54th Legislatures. He also served as a Hill County Commissioner. Carmichall was affiliated with the Democratic Party.
