= SS Tharros =

A number of steamships have been named Tharros, including:

- SS Tharros (1919), a Greek cargo ship in service 1950–51
- SS Tharros (1945), a British cargo ship in service during 1950
