= SS Errington Court =

Three steamships of Court Line were named Errington Court, as was a motor vessel.

- SS Errington Court (1909), in service 1909–20
- SS Errington Court (1925), in service 1925–47
- SS Errington Court (1945), in service 1950–56

See also

- MV Errington Court
