= Bynum High School =

Coordinates: 31.9679°N 97.0005°W

Location
- 704 Toliver; Bynum, Texas 76631-0068; United States

Information
- School type: Public high school
- School district: Bynum Independent School District
- Principal: Lindsey Peterson
- Teaching staff: 20.95 (FTE)
- Grades: PK-12
- Enrollment: 184 (2023–2024)
- Student to teacher ratio: 8.78
- Colors: Maroon & White
- Athletics conference: UIL Class A
- Mascot: Bulldog
- Website: Bynum High School website

Bynum High School is a public high school located in Bynum, Texas (USA). It is part of the Bynum Independent School District located in south central Hill County and classified as a 1A school by the UIL. In 2015, the school was rated "Met Standard" by the Texas Education Agency.

== Athletics ==
The Bynum Bulldogs compete in Volleyball, 6-Man Football, Basketball, Golf, Tennis, and Track.
