= Brandon, Texas =

Unincorporated community in Texas, US

Coordinates: 32°02′45″N 96°57′38″W

Brandon is an unincorporated community located in Hill County in Central Texas, United States. It is located at the intersection of State Highway 22 and FM 1243, approximately ten miles east of Hillsboro.

== History ==
Brandon had an estimated population of eighty in 2010. It once had its own school, located at the site of the present community center, but that burned down in the early 20th century. The building that now serves as the community center was originally built as a school building, but a dwindling population forced its closure. Area students have been attending school in the nearby town of Bynum (Bynum ISD) since at least the 1970s. Although the community is unincorporated, it has a post office, with the ZIP code of 76628.

Originally part of Navarro County, a post office was opened near here in 1852 and given the name of White Rock. A year later, with the formation of Hill County, the small community was within the Hill County lines.

After the Civil War, the name of the post office was changed (several other communities were named White Rock) to Jackson. In 1868 a Dr. J.R. Harrington (dentist), founder of the town, built one of the earliest grist mills in Hill County. Corn meal, basic to settlers' diets, was ground here. Dr. Harrington built a dam on White Rock Creek near here as a water source for power in the millhouse. A grist mill was a primary need in every early community. Where bread could be made, settlements thrived. A good water supply and a grist mill were essential to a successful town. The final change of name occurred in 1873 when the doctor named the town Brandon and became the community's postmaster.

As a result of its location on the Hillsboro to Corsicana road, Brandon grew. The railroad arrived in 1888 but missed the town by a mile. The community didn't have any problem with relocation, and local resident Robert Andrew Ferguson donated land near the railroad line for the new location. Citizens suggested renaming the town "Ferguson" in his honor but Ferguson rejected the suggestion and the town retained the name Brandon.

The brand new town with the old name counted 75 residents in 1890. It incorporated in 1892 and a new school was built. By 1914, Brandon had a population of 450 which fell to 260 during the Great Depression. The grist mill fell into disuse sometime before 1918. In 1936 the railroad moved and remaining businesses left or closed. By 1967 only the stone foundation of the grist mill remained. By 1980, the number of residents had fallen to 80 – where it is estimated remained for the 1990, 2000 and 2010 census (estimated as Brandon as a community is not officially on the census).

A cemetery remains in the original town of Brandon.

According to the Texas Historical Marker in front of the community center (dated 1967) - "Old Brandon Grist Mill. 1 1/2 miles southwest. One of earliest grist mills in Hill County. Built (1868) by Dr. Jas. T. Harrington, who also founded town of Brandon. Corn meal, basic to settlers' diet, was ground here. Dr. Harrington Built a dam on White Rock Creek near here as a water source for power in the millhouse. His grist mill served a wide area for nearly 50 years. A grist mill was primary need in every early community. Where bread could be made, settlements thrived. A good water supply and a grist mill were essential to a successful town. Today only stone foundations of old Brandon Mill remain."

There was a cotton gin in the mid-20th century that employed a good portion of the community, it has been closed since at least the 1990s and the building no longer exists. The community at one point operated with a mayoral system, the last Mayor's house still stands at the end of FM 4372, though it is severely dilapidated. A former gas station, now dilapidated, can be viewed on the north side of FM 1243, just west of the community center. It has been closed since at least the 1990s. A Methodist church stood in community until the 1990s, on the south side of the western corner of Hillsboro Street.

== Photo gallery ==
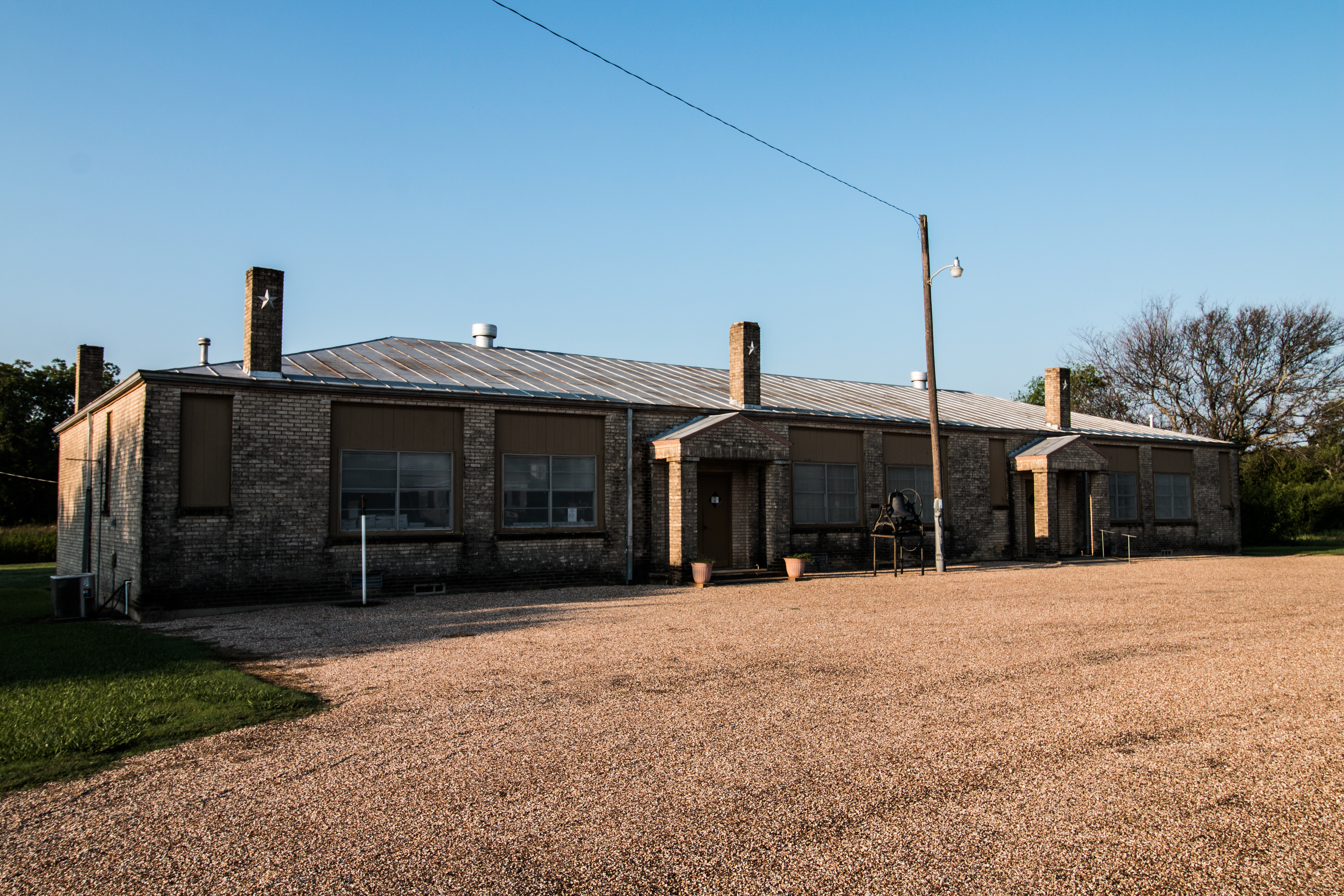
Brandon Community Center

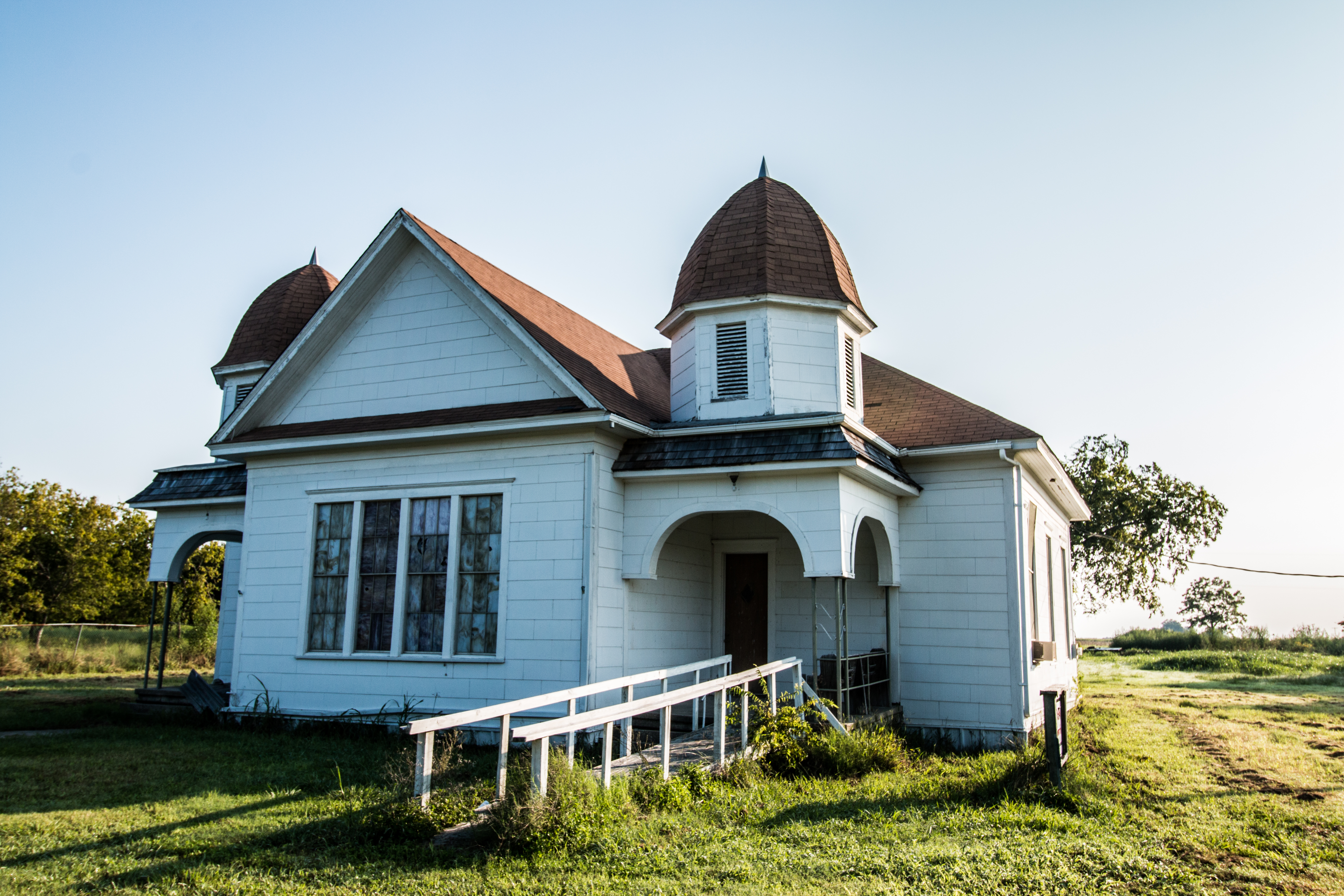
Brandon Baptist Church
