= Birome, Texas =

Unincorporated community in Texas, US

Coordinates: 31°48′48″N 96°57′46″W

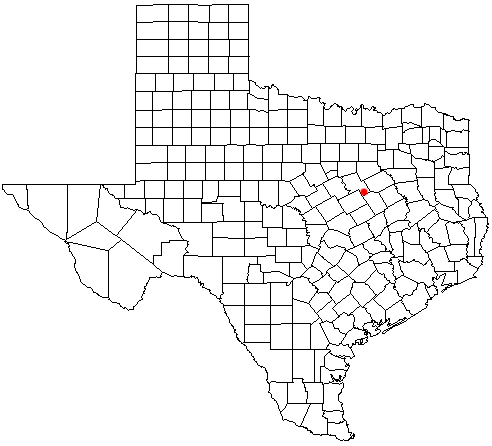
Location of Birome in the state of Texas

Birome (/baɪˈroʊm/ bye-ROHM) is an unincorporated community in south central Hill County in Central Texas, United States. It is located approximately fifteen miles south of Hillsboro, at the intersection of FM 308 and County Road 3238.

Birome was founded in 1910 when the International-Great Northern Railroad was extended to that point. The town's name is a portmanteau of Bickham and Jerome Cartwright, brothers who owned the original town site.

Birome had an estimated population of thirty-one in 2000. Area students attend school in the nearby town of Penelope (Penelope ISD).
