= French frigate Pénélope =

The French Navy had the following ships named Pénélope:

- French frigate Pénélope (1787), wrecked 1788
- French frigate Pénélope (1806), an Armide-class frigate
- French frigate Pénélope (1840), lead Pénélope-class frigate

== See also ==
- Penelope (disambiguation)
