= Vaughan, Texas =

Community in Texas

Coordinates: 31°54′53″N 97°10′25″W

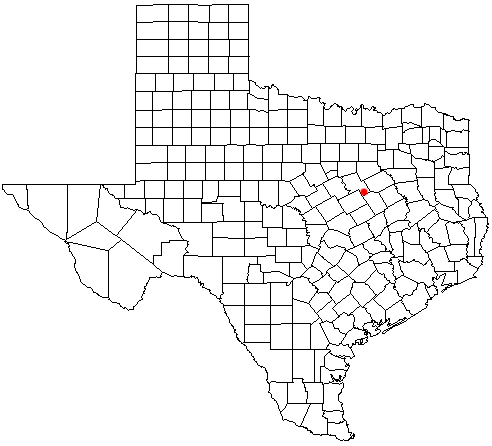
Location of Vaughan in the state of Texas.

Vaughan is an unincorporated community in southern Hill County in Central Texas, United States. The community is located approximately eight miles south of Hillsboro, at the intersection of Farm Roads 1947 and 310, and roughly half a mile from Aquilla Lake.

== History ==
The first Anglo settlement, named Willow, was located two miles to the east. The community included a church and a school. Vaughan was likely named after a local resident in the 1880s, Dr. B. H. Vaughan. A post office was established in 1885, and a population of twenty-five was recorded in 1890. The community also featured a general store, a wagonmaker and a physician at this time. A cotton gin was constructed in 1898 and a Baptist church was built circa 1900. A Methodist church was also founded around this time. By 1915, the Vaughan and Willow schools had been consolidated. By the 1930s, the population was fifty. The population remained steady until the 1960s. A tornado killed seven people in Vaughan in 1959, with a number of buildings, including its churches, being destroyed.

By the 1970s, the population had increased to seventy; however, by the 1980s, the Baptist church was the only institution still in operation. In 2010, the population was seventy-five.
