= Blanton, Texas =

Blanton
- Unincorporated Community
- Interactive map of Blanton
- Location within Texas Blanton (the United States)
- Coordinates: 32°6′25″N 97°18′59″W
- Country: United States
- State: Texas
- County: Hill County
- Elevation: 810 ft (247 m)
- Postal code: 76634

Blanton is an unincorporated community located along Farm Road 934 on Hill County, Texas, United States.

== History ==
Blanton was erected in 1876 and by 1881, received a post office. By the mid-1880s, the community featured a school, cotton gins, gristmills, as well as a Baptist, Methodist, Episcopal, and Presbyterian church. The population of the community was 50 in 1890 and grew around 150 by the late 1890s. The population of the community declined by the early 1900s when the Texas and Brazos Valley Railway was built across the community. The post office closed in 1902, and by the 1930s the community had a school that then closed by the 1950s, church, farms, a business that opened until 1903, and a cemetery that was established in 1876 known as the Blanton Cemetery. In 2000, Blanton had a population of eight.
