= Irene, Texas =

Unincorporated community in Texas, US

- Location in Texas
- Coordinates: 31°59′32″N 96°52′17″W
- Country: United States
- State: Texas
- County: Hill
- Elevation: 522 ft (159 m)
- GNIS feature ID: 2412717

Irene is an unincorporated community in Hill County, Texas, United States.

It is located approximately twelve miles southeast of Hillsboro, near the intersection of Farm to Market Road 308 and 1946.

Irene had an estimated population of 170 in 2000. Area students attend school in the nearby town of Bynum's supporting school district. It has a post office and its ZIP code is 76650.
