= Nolan River Bridge 303-A of the Gulf, Colorado and Santa Fe Railway =

- U.S. National Register of Historic Places
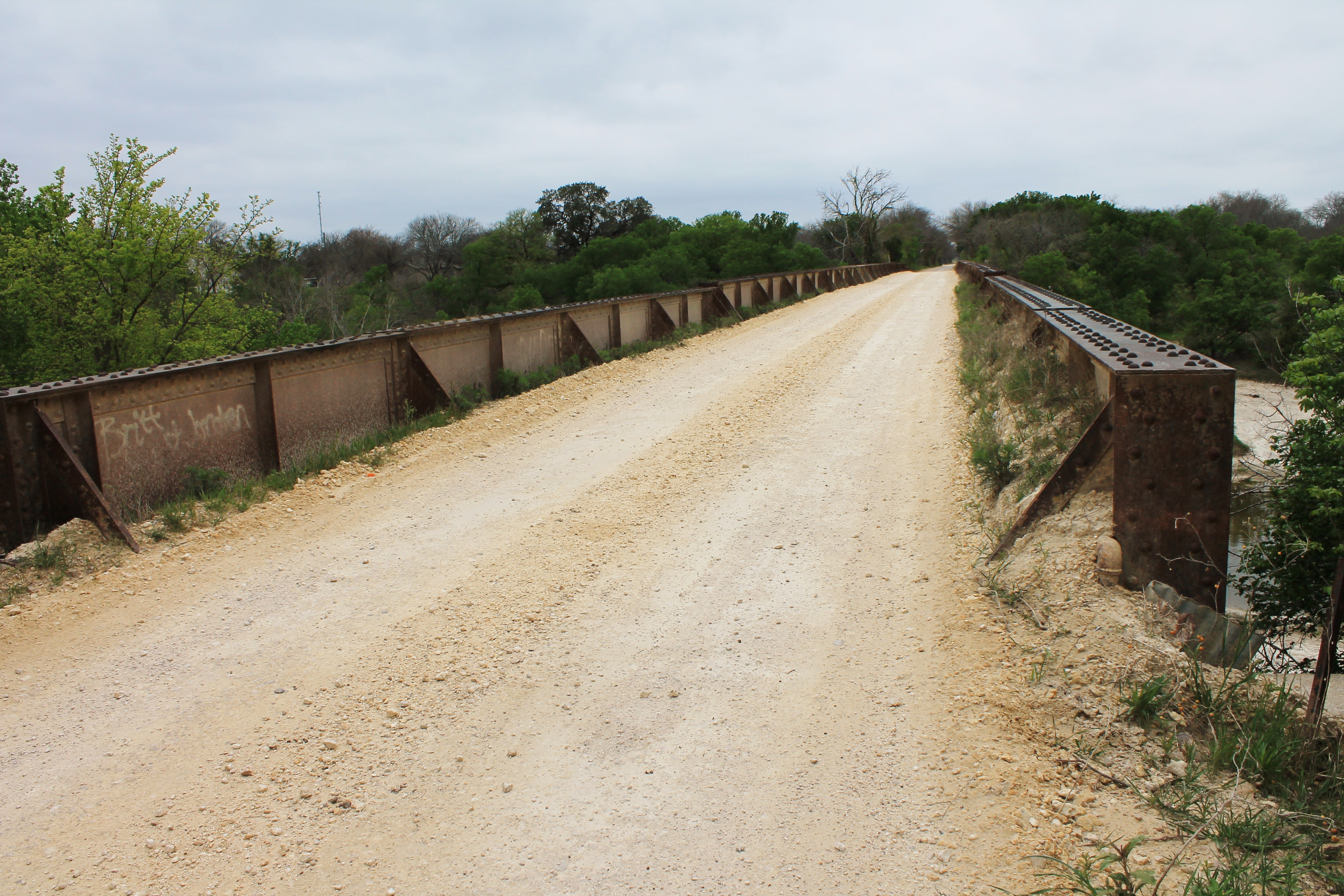
- Nolan River Bridge in 2013

- Location within Texas Location within the United States
- Location: Cty. Rd. 1127 at Nolan River, Blum, Texas
- Coordinates: 32°8′50″N 97°23′49″W
- Area: less than one acre
- Built: 1899-1903
- Built by: Gulf, Colorado and Santa Fe Railway
- NRHP reference No.: 12001001
- Added to NRHP: December 4, 2012

Nolan River Bridge is a single track girder bridge that crosses the Nolan River located in Blum, Texas. The bridge, constructed in stages between 1899 and 1903, was used for railroad traffic until 1952, after which it was used as for vehicular traffic.

It was added to the National Register in December 4, 2012.

== History ==
The bridge was constructed in stages between 1899 and 1903 to replace an earlier bridge, built in 1881, that consisted of three limestone piers with two iron trusses and timber approaches. The three limestone piers of the original bridge were heightened, and two additional, shorter piers of stone and concrete were added, and the iron trusses were replaced with six steel plate girder spans. The bridge was rated to carry two 139-ton steam locomotives, followed by a load of 3,200 pounds per square foot. The bridge was used by the Gulf, Colorado and Santa Fe Railway for freight and passenger trains until 1952, when construction of the Whitney Dam on the Brazos River led to the relocation of the tracks to higher ground. The bridge was converted later that year for use for vehicle traffic as a county road, which it is still used for today.

== Photo gallery ==
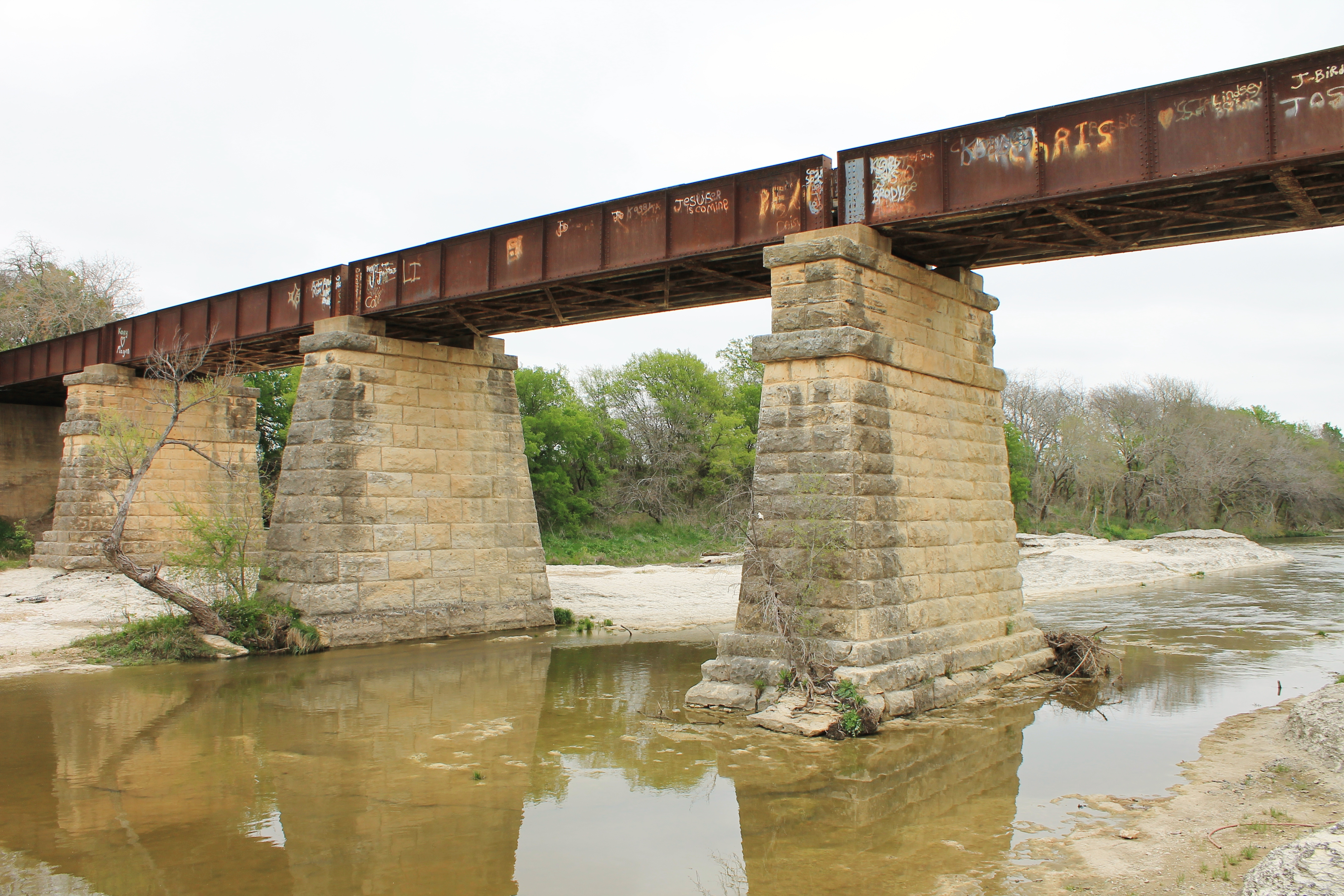

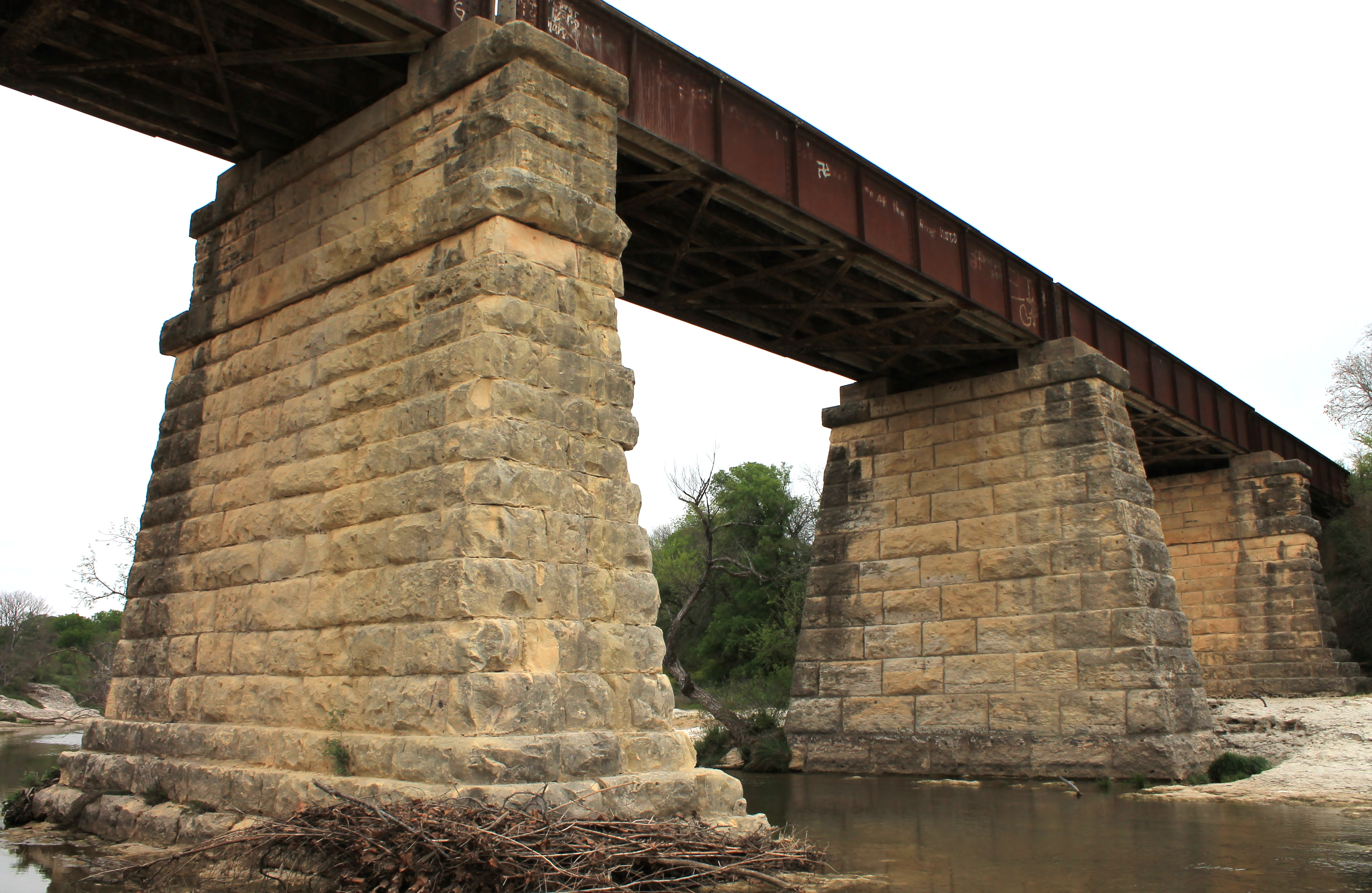

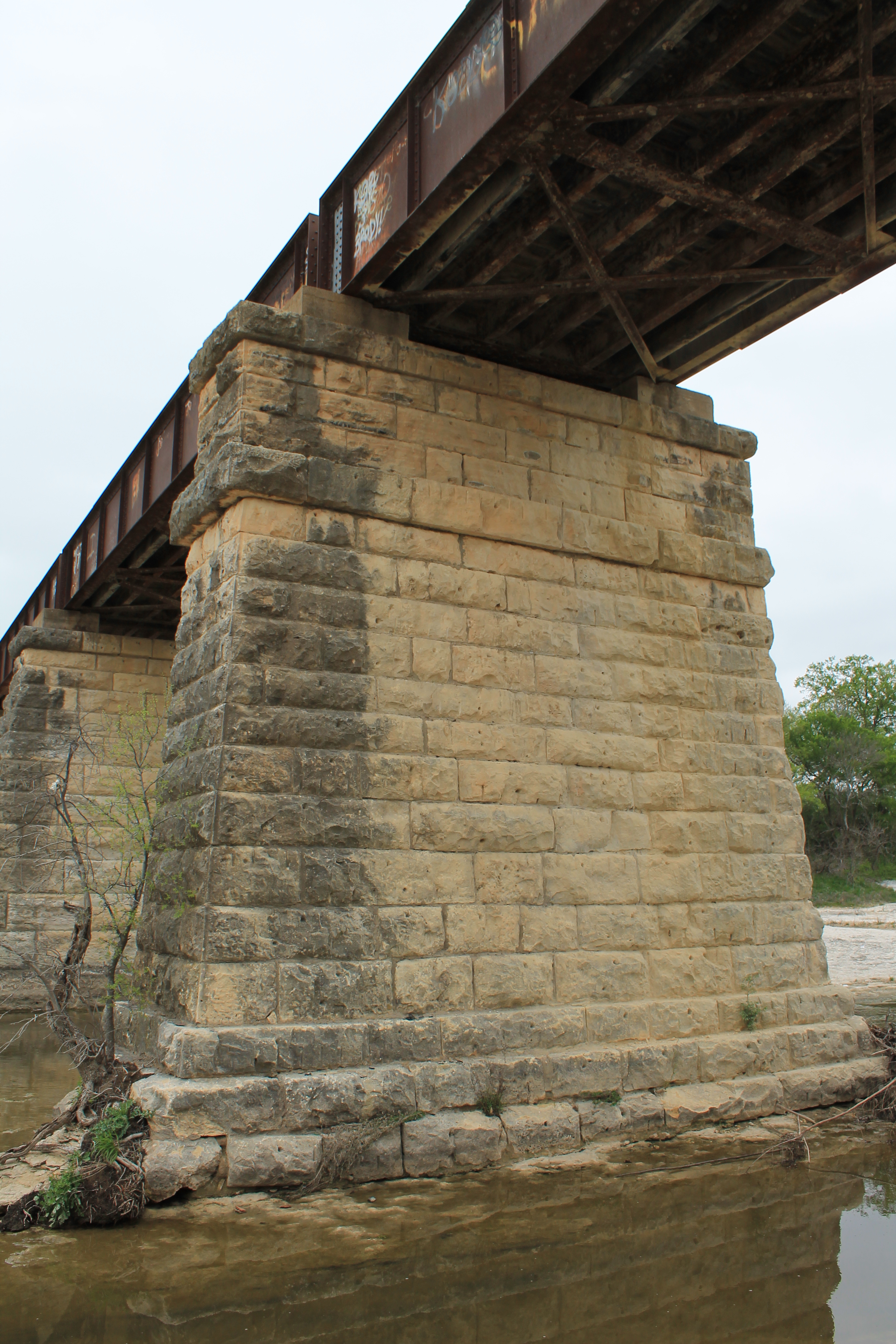

== See also ==
- National Register of Historic Places listings in Hill County, Texas
- List of bridges on the National Register of Historic Places in Texas
