= Mayfield, Hill County, Texas =

Unincorporated community in Texas, US

Mayfield
- Unincorporated community
- Location in Texas
- Coordinates: 32°05′48″N 97°11′39″W
- Country: United States
- State: Texas
- County: Hill
- Settled: 1865
- Elevation: 702 ft (214 m)
- GNIS feature ID: 1341109

Mayfield in an unincorporated community in Hill County, Texas, United States.

== History ==
Mayfield is situated on Texas State Highway 171 and is beside Hackberry Creek. The land was for sale in the 1850s, and was settled in 1865. A baptist church was founded in Prairiedale in 1881 and later moved to Mayfield. The community was officially named in 1904, when the Trinity and Brazos Valley Railway was extended to the town. From the 1950s, the community declined and by 2009, had a population of 25.
