= Kirby, Hill County, Texas =

Ghost town in Texas, US

Kirby, or Kerby, is a ghost town in Hill County, Texas, United States.

== History ==
Kirby is situated four miles west of the Texas Electric Railway line It was first settled by Henry Ross in the 1840s, and his land was used to establish the town. Robert Moore Duff moved to Kirby from Texarkana, Texas in 1881, and owned 500 acres of land, which reached the Texas Electric railway line. A post office operated from 1899 to 1903, and the town had a grocery store which burned down in 1920. The town was abandoned by 1938.
