= Menlow, Texas =

Unincorporated community in Hill County

Coordinates: 31°52′10.57″N 97°9′38.02″W

Menlow is an unincorporated community in Hill County, in the U.S. state of Texas.

== History ==
Menlow was settled in 1890s by families from Carolinas, Alabama, Mississippi, Georgia, Tennessee, Kentucky, and Arkansas, as well as from Europe. A post office called Menlow was established in 1895, and remained in operation until 1903.

In 1970's, Menlow has 10 inhabitants. This same figure continued to be recorded in 2000.
