= Whitney, Texas =

- City
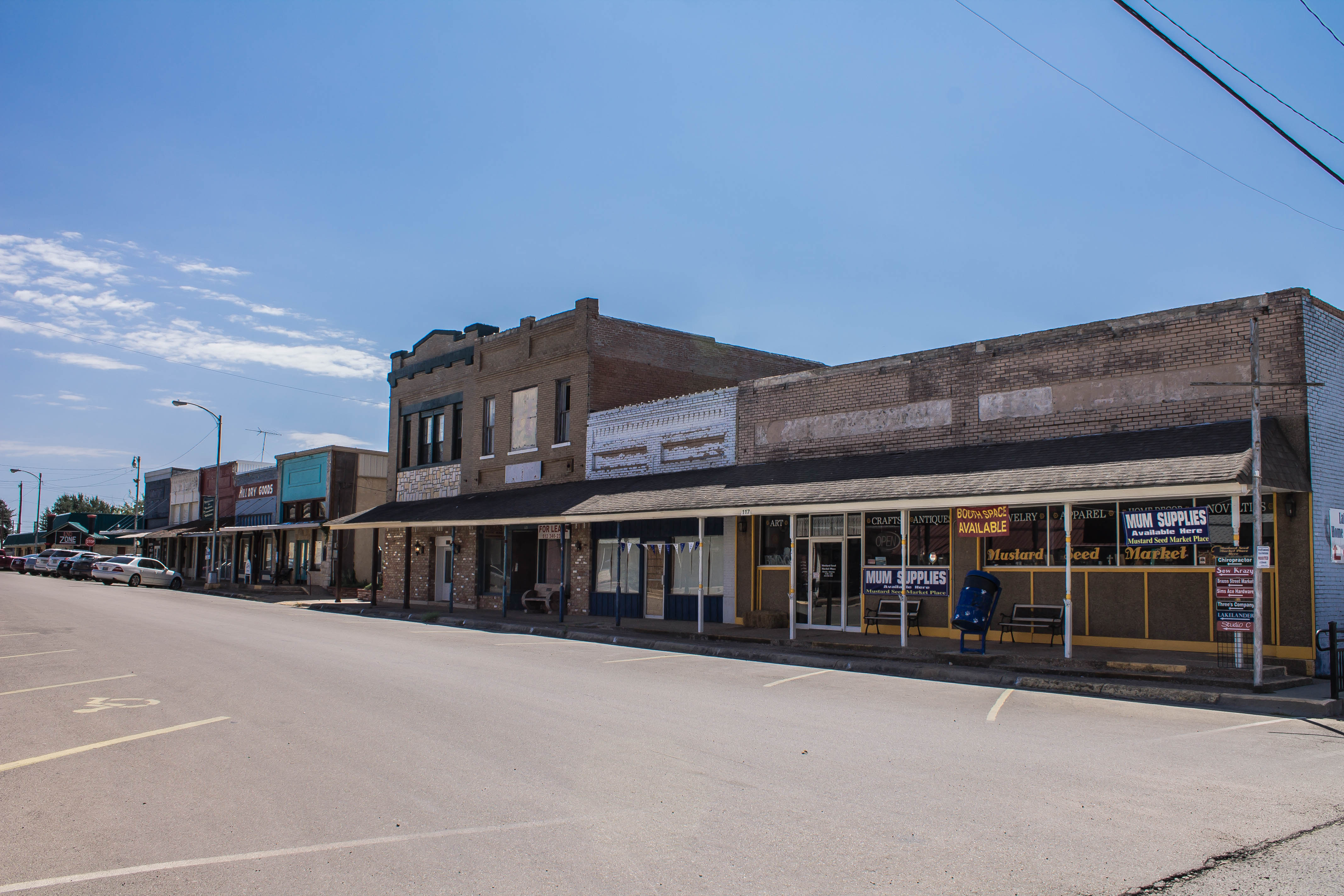
- Downtown Whitney
- Nickname: "Getaway Capital of Texas"
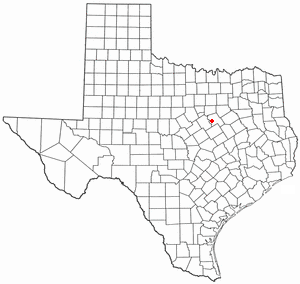
- Location of Whitney, Texas

- Coordinates: 31°57′07″N 97°19′10″W
- Country: United States
- State: Texas
- County: Hill

Area
  - Total: 1.88 sq mi (4.88 km^{2})
  - Land: 1.86 sq mi (4.82 km^{2})
  - Water: 0.023 sq mi (0.06 km^{2})
- Elevation: 587 ft (179 m)

Population (2020)
  - Total: 1,992
  - Density: 1,162.2/sq mi (448.72/km^{2})
- Time zone: UTC-6 (Central (CST))
  - Summer (DST): UTC-5 (CDT)
- ZIP code: 76692
- Area code: 254
- FIPS code: 48-78664
- GNIS feature ID: 2413482
- Website: cityofwhitneytx.org

Whitney is a city in Hill County, Texas, United States. Its population was 1,992 at the 2020 census. The city is 3 miles (5 km) east of Lake Whitney.

== History ==
Whitney was established in 1876 when the Houston and Texas Central Railroad (H&TC) built a line through Hill County to Cleburne. The town's namesake comes from Charles A. Whitney, principal stock holder of H&TC, and son-in-law of Charles Morgan.

=== Battle of the Benches ===
In 1922, D. ("Doctor Dee") Scarborough, the druggist of Whitney, installed a bench outside of his store. Within a short period of time, the bench became home to the local old men seeking refuge from the sun and women; comfortably installed on its well-worn planks, they whittled, spat tobacco juice on the sidewalks, studied the weather and damned the modern world with lordliness and venom.

In the following years after World War II, Whitney began to modernize. The town's housewives absorbed the spirit of change and called on the young Mayor Fred Basham to remove the bench, complaining about the spitting and language of the old men. The mayor complied and had the chief of police move the bench into an alley nearby. Upon the discovery their sanctuary was ignominiously lugged into a nearby alley, the old men of the town angrily threw a petition to asking for the bench to be placed back.

When the town ignored the old men, they dragged nail kegs to the spot where the bench had originally reposed. The chief of police threatened to confiscate the nail kegs. That was more than the old men could take. They demanded, and finally received a special municipal election to decide whether the bench should be restored.

On July 30, 1949, the women and mayor were defeated by a vote of 124 to 67 in favor of returning the bench.

== Geography ==
Located in western Hill County Texas State Highway 22 passes through the southeast side of the city, leading east 12 miles (19 km) to Hillsboro, the county seat, and west 26 miles (42 km) to Meridian. Lake Whitney State Park is 3 miles (5 km) west of Whitney via Farm to Market Road 1244.

According to the United States Census Bureau, the city has a total area of 1.9 square miles (4.9 km^{2}), of which 0.02 square miles (0.06 km^{2}), or 1.23%, is covered by water.

== Demographics ==
Historical population
Census	Pop.	Note	%±
1880	526		—
1910	766		—
1920	1,011		32.0%
1930	751		−25.7%
1940	824		9.7%
1950	1,383		67.8%
1960	1,050		−24.1%
1970	1,371		30.6%
1980	1,631		19.0%
1990	1,626		−0.3%
2000	1,833		12.7%
2010	2,087		13.9%
2020	1,992		−4.6%
U.S. Decennial Census

=== 2020 census ===
Whitney racial composition (NH = Non-Hispanic) (Note: Note: the US Census treats Hispanic/Latino as an ethnic category. This table excludes Latinos from the racial categories and assigns them to a separate category. Hispanics/Latinos can be of any race.)
Race	Number	Percentage
White (NH)	1,436	72.09%
Black or African American (NH)	133	6.68%
Native American or Alaska Native (NH)	3	0.15%
Asian (NH)	15	0.75%
Pacific Islander (NH)	1	0.05%
Some Other Race (NH)	5	0.25%
Mixed/Multi-Racial (NH)	82	4.12%
Hispanic or Latino	317	15.91%
Total	1,992	

As of the 2020 United States census, there were 1,992 people, 762 households, and 497 families residing in the town.

=== 2000 census ===
At the 2000 census, 1,833 people, 684 households, and 443 families were residing in the town. The population density was 1,132.3/sq mi (436.9/km^{2}). The 770 housing units averaged 475.6/sq mi (183.5/km^{2}). The racial makeup of the town was 88.11% White, 7.09% African American, 0.16% Native American, 0.16% Asian, 2.73% from other races, and 1.75% from two or more races. Hispanics or Latinos of any race were 9.27% of the population.

Of the 684 households, 32.3% had children under the age of 18 living with them, 45.6% were married couples living together, 15.9% had a female householder with no husband present, and 35.2% were not families. About 32.2% of all households were made up of individuals, and 21.1% had someone living alone who was 65 or older. The average household size was 2.46, and the average family size was 3.11.

In the town, the age distribution was 26.5% under 18, 7.3% from 18 to 24, 22.5% from 25 to 44, 19.0% from 45 to 64, and 24.8% who were 65 or older. The median age was 40 years. For every 100 females, there were 71.5 males. For every 100 females age 18 and over, there were 70.0 males.

The median household income was $25,174 and the median family income was $30,833. Males had a median income of $28,036 and females $18,487. The per capita income was $12,772. About 17.9% of families and 21.8% of the population were below the poverty line, including 25.7% of those under 18 and 17.5% of those 65 or over.

== Education ==
The city is served by the Whitney Independent School District.

== Notable people ==
- Tommy Duncan, country musician and founding member of the Texas Playboys
- John Prentice, cartoonist and comic-book artist was born in Whitney.
- Sanger (Whitey) Shafer, accomplished country music songwriter and musician
