= W. Boone Fields =

American politician (1926–2001)

Member of the Texas House of Representatives from the 54th district
- In office January 13, 1953 – January 8, 1957
- Preceded by: Jack Yarbrough Hardee
- Succeeded by: Jim Joseph Carmichall

Personal details
- Born: November 29, 1926
- Died: December 3, 2001 (aged 76)
- Resting place: Oak Lawn Memorial Park, Athens, Texas
- Party: Democratic

W. Boone Fields (November 29, 1926 — December 3, 2001), also known as W.B. Fields, was a Texas politician who represented district 54 in the Texas House of Representatives, which at the time composed of Henderson County, Texas. He was affiliated with the Democratic Party.

== Personal life ==
W. Boone Fields was born on November 29, 1926. He died at the age of 76 on December 3, 2001.

== Political career ==
Fields assumed office to represent district 54 of the Texas House of Representatives on January 9, 1951, succeeding Jack Yarbrough Hardee. While serving as a state representative, he served on the Common Carriers Committee, Criminal Jurisprudence Committee, Revenue and Taxation Committee, Penitentiaries Committee, and was vice chair of the Examination of Comptroller's and Treasurer's Accounts Committee. He left office on January 13, 1953, being succeeded by Jim Joseph Carmichall. Throughout his time in the legislature he was affiliated with the Democratic Party.
