= Hill County, Texas =

County in Texas, US

- County
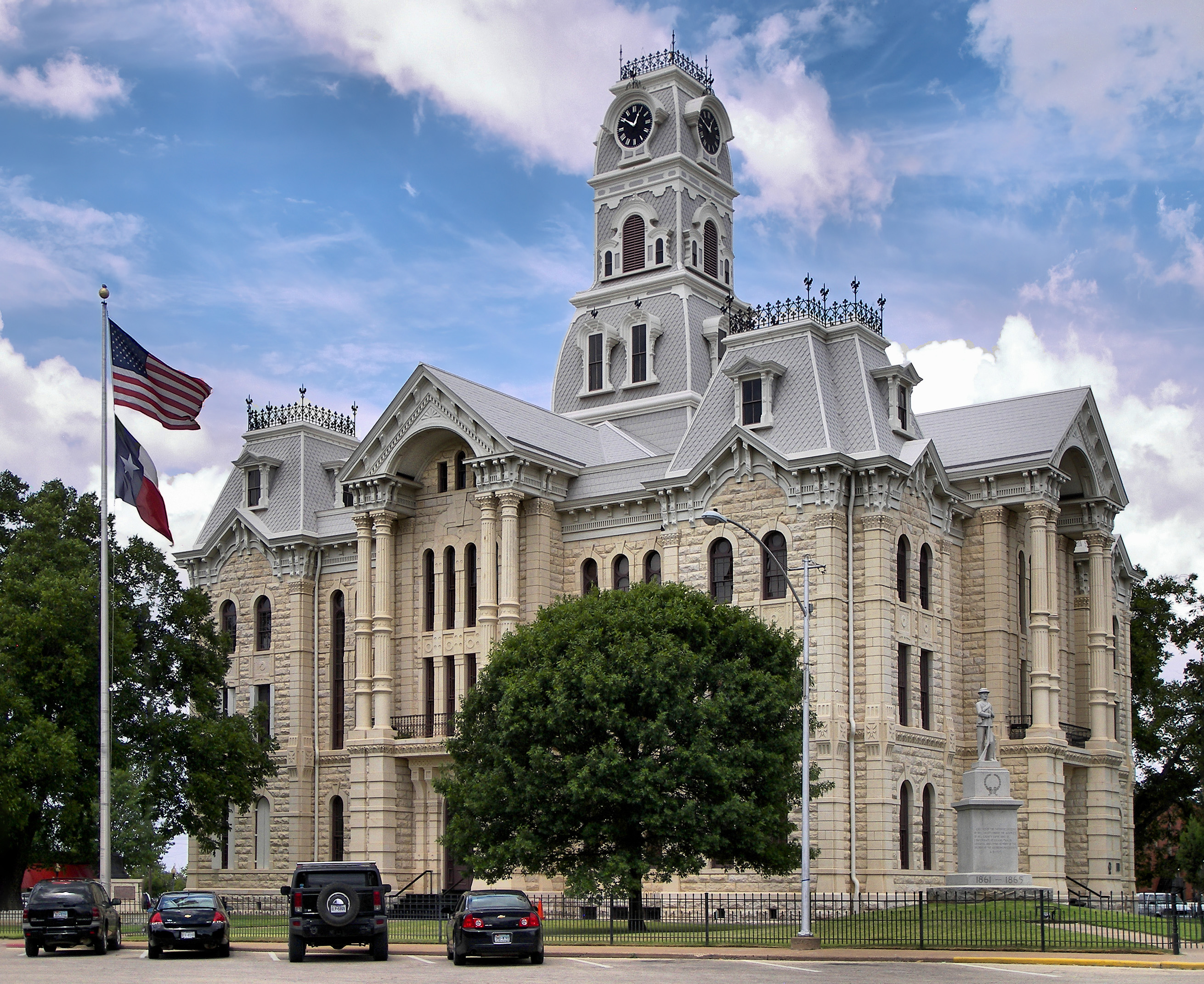
- Hill County Courthouse in downtown Hillsboro

- Location within the U.S. state of Texas
- Coordinates: 31°59′N 97°08′W
- Country: United States
- State: Texas
- Founded: 1853
- Named for: George Washington Hill
- Seat: Hillsboro
- Largest city: Hillsboro

Area
  - Total: 986 sq mi (2,550 km^{2})
  - Land: 959 sq mi (2,480 km^{2})
  - Water: 27 sq mi (70 km^{2}) 2.7%

Population (2020)
  - Total: 35,874
  - Estimate (2025): 39,503 ▲
  - Density: 37.4/sq mi (14.4/km^{2})
- Time zone: UTC−6 (Central)
  - Summer (DST): UTC−5 (CDT)
- Congressional district: 6th
- Website: www.co.hill.tx.us

Hill County is a county in the U.S. state of Texas. As of the 2020 census, its population was 35,874. Its county seat is Hillsboro. The county is named for George Washington Hill, secretary of war and secretary of the navy in the Republic of Texas. Hill County is part of Central Texas, though not included in the Texas Hill Country.

== Geography ==
According to the U.S. Census Bureau, the county has a total area of 986 square miles (2,550 km^{2}), of which 959 square miles (2,480 km^{2}) are land and 27 square miles (70 km^{2}) (2.7%) are covered by water.

=== Major highways ===
- Interstate 35
  - Interstate 35E
  - Interstate 35W
- U.S. Highway 77
- State Highway 22
- State Highway 31
- State Highway 81
- State Highway 171
- State Highway 174
- Spur 176
- Spur 180
- Spur 193
- Spur 579

=== Adjacent counties ===
- Johnson County (north)
- Ellis County (northeast)
- Navarro County (east)
- Limestone County (southeast)
- McLennan County (south)
- Bosque County (west)

== Demographics ==
Historical population
Census	Pop.	Note	%±
1860	3,653		—
1870	7,453		104.0%
1880	16,554		122.1%
1890	27,583		66.6%
1900	41,355		49.9%
1910	46,760		13.1%
1920	43,332		−7.3%
1930	43,036		−0.7%
1940	38,355		−10.9%
1950	31,282		−18.4%
1960	23,650		−24.4%
1970	22,596		−4.5%
1980	25,024		10.7%
1990	27,146		8.5%
2000	32,321		19.1%
2010	35,089		8.6%
2020	35,874		2.2%
2025 (est.)	39,503	▲	10.1%
U.S. Decennial Census; 1850–2010 2010 2020

=== Racial and ethnic composition ===
Hill County, Texas – Racial and ethnic composition Note: the US Census treats Hispanic/Latino as an ethnic category. This table excludes Latinos from the racial categories and assigns them to a separate category. Hispanics/Latinos may be of any race.
Race / Ethnicity (NH = Non-Hispanic)	Pop 1980	Pop 1990	Pop 2000	Pop 2010	Pop 2020	% 1980	% 1990	% 2000	% 2010	% 2020
White alone (NH)	20,999	22,310	25,079	25,836	24,123	83.92%	82.19%	77.59%	73.63%	67.24%
Black or African American alone (NH)	2,497	2,492	2,359	2,161	2,055	9.98%	9.18%	7.30%	6.16%	5.73%
Native American or Alaska Native alone (NH)	45	66	84	118	137	0.18%	0.24%	0.26%	0.34%	0.38%
Asian alone (NH)	41	36	78	105	188	0.16%	0.13%	0.24%	0.30%	0.52%
Native Hawaiian or Pacific Islander alone (NH)	x	x	4	20	15	x	x	0.01%	0.06%	0.04%
Other race alone (NH)	28	12	9	19	87	0.11%	0.04%	0.03%	0.05%	0.24%
Multiracial (NH)	x	x	348	403	1,385	x	x	1.08%	1.15%	3.86%
Hispanic or Latino (any race)	1,414	2,230	4,360	6,427	7,884	5.65%	8.21%	13.49%	18.32%	21.98%
Total	25,024	27,146	32,321	35,089	35,874	100.00%	100.00%	100.00%	100.00%	100.00%

=== 2020 census ===
As of the 2020 census, the county had a population of 35,874. The median age was 42.6 years; 23.4% of residents were under 18 and 21.3% were 65 or older. For every 100 females, there were 99.1 males, and for every 100 females 18 and over, there were 96.9 males 18 and over.

The racial makeup of the county was 72.7% White, 5.9% Black or African American, 1.0% American Indian and Alaska Native, 0.5% Asian, 0.1% Native Hawaiian and Pacific Islander, 9.5% from some other race, and 10.4% from two or more races. Hispanic or Latino residents of any race comprised 22.0% of the population.

About 22.5% of residents lived in urban areas, while 77.5% lived in rural areas.

Of the 13,729 households in the county, 30.0% had children under 18 living in them, 52.3% were married-couple households, 18.3% were households with a male householder and no spouse or partner present, and 24.1% were households with a female householder and no spouse or partner present. About 26.3% of all households were made up of individuals, and 13.7% had someone living alone who was 65 or older.

The county had 16,178 housing units, of which 15.1% were vacant. Among occupied housing units, 75.1% were owner-occupied and 24.9% were renter-occupied. The homeowner vacancy rate was 2.0% and the rental vacancy rate was 7.7%.

=== 2010 census ===
A Williams Institute analysis of 2010 census data found about 3.2 same-sex couples per 1,000 households were in the county.

=== 2000 census ===
As of the 2000 census, 32,321 people, 12,204 households, and 8,725 families were residing in the county. The population density was 34 people/mi^{2} (13 people/km^{2}). The 14,624 housing units averaged 15 per square mile (5.8/km^{2}). The racial makeup of the county was 84.16% White, 7.40% African American, 0.44% Native American, 0.25% Asian, 6.04% from other races, and 1.71% from two or more races. About 13.49% of the population were Hispanics or Latinos of any race.

Of the 12,204 households, 30.7% had children under 18 living with them, 57.5% were married couples living together, 10.1% had a female householder with no husband present, and 28.5% were not families. About 24.8% of all households were made up of individuals, and 12.5% had someone living alone who was 65 or older. The average household size was 2.58, and the average family size was 3.07.

In the county, the age distribution was 25.9% under 18, 8.5% from 18 to 24, 24.9% from 25 to 44, 23.4% from 45 to 64, and 17.3% who were 65 or older. The median age was 38 years. For every 100 females there were 96.7 males. For every 100 females 18 and over, there were 93.7 males.

The median income in the county for a household was $31,600 and for a family was $37,791. Males had a median income of $29,438 versus $20,765 for females. The per capita income for the county was $15,514. About 11.90% of families and 15.70% of the population were below the poverty line, including 19.70% of those under 18 and 14.60% of those 65 or over.

== Government ==
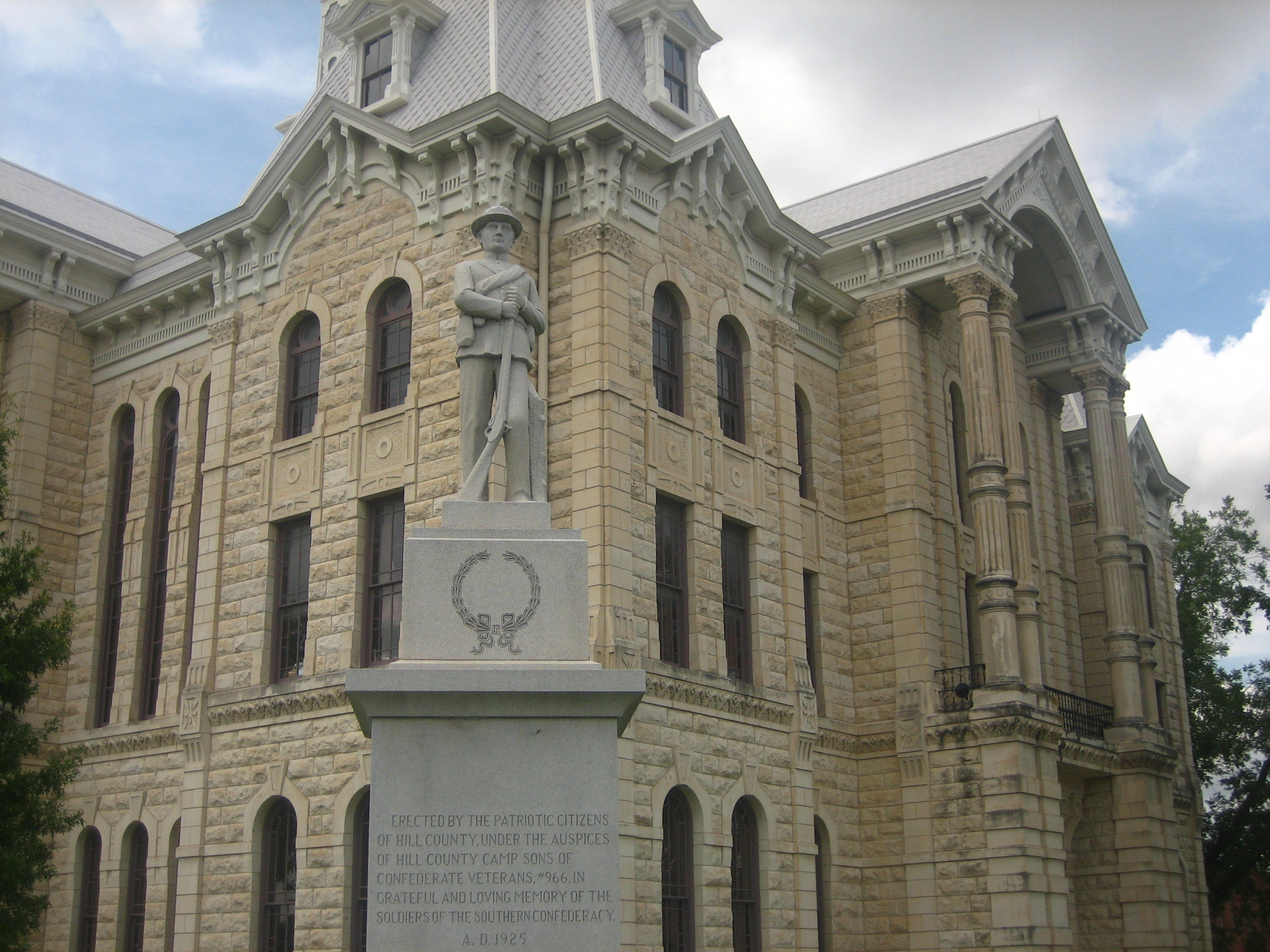
Confederate memorial at Hill County Courthouse

The Hill County Sheriff's Office' is the law enforcement agency that oversees Hill County and operates the Hill County Jail in Hillsboro. The current sheriff is Hunter Barnes.The first sheriff of Hill County was Charley Davis.

== Media ==
Serving Hill County exclusively are media outlets KHBR Radio - 1560 AM and The Reporter newspaper. Hill County is currently listed as part of the Dallas-Fort Worth DMA. Local media outlets include: KDFW-TV, KXAS-TV, WFAA-TV, KTVT-TV, KERA-TV, KTXA-TV, KDFI-TV, KDAF-TV, and KFWD-TV, although it is located in Central Texas and a neighboring county of the Waco metropolitan area. All of the Waco/Temple/Killeen market stations also provide coverage for Hill County. They include: KCEN-TV, KWTX-TV, KXXV-TV, KDYW, and KWKT-TV. Northland Cable Television continues to offer all of the above stations in Hillsboro.

== Communities ==
=== Cities ===
- Abbott
- Aquilla
- Covington
- Hillsboro (county seat)
- Hubbard
- Itasca
- Mount Calm
- Whitney

=== Towns ===
- Blum
- Bynum
- Carl's Corner
- Malone
- Mertens
- Penelope

=== Unincorporated communities ===
- Birome
- Brandon
- Huron
- Irene
- Lovelace
- Mayfield
- Menlow
- Osceola
- Peoria
- Vaughan
- Woodbury

=== Ghost towns ===
- Kirby
- Prairiedale
- Towash

== Politics ==
Hill County, like most of the rural South, is currently overwhelmingly Republican. The last Democrat to carry Hill County was Bill Clinton in 1992. Before this, like most of Texas, Hill County was solidly Democratic; up to 1979, the county had voted Republican only against Catholic Al Smith in 1928 and against George McGovern in 1972.

United States presidential election results for Hill County, Texas
Year	Republican		Democratic		Third party(ies)	
Year	No.	%	No.	%	No.	%
1912	129	4.18%	2,674	86.73%	280	9.08%
1916	382	8.61%	3,951	89.07%	103	2.32%
1920	1,022	19.83%	3,254	63.12%	879	17.05%
1924	807	12.07%	5,778	86.39%	103	1.54%
1928	2,446	50.34%	2,413	49.66%	0	0.00%
1932	360	6.36%	5,297	93.55%	5	0.09%
1936	265	5.32%	4,710	94.58%	5	0.10%
1940	627	9.46%	6,002	90.54%	0	0.00%
1944	516	8.62%	4,876	81.48%	592	9.89%
1948	657	12.18%	4,362	80.85%	376	6.97%
1952	3,242	41.85%	4,504	58.14%	1	0.01%
1956	2,487	37.08%	4,199	62.61%	21	0.31%
1960	2,226	33.76%	4,340	65.83%	27	0.41%
1964	1,557	23.25%	5,130	76.61%	9	0.13%
1968	1,809	25.93%	3,415	48.95%	1,753	25.13%
1972	4,481	70.25%	1,882	29.50%	16	0.25%
1976	2,680	33.37%	5,327	66.32%	25	0.31%
1980	4,113	46.03%	4,688	52.46%	135	1.51%
1984	5,344	60.80%	3,420	38.91%	26	0.30%
1988	4,796	52.14%	4,381	47.63%	21	0.23%
1992	3,669	35.36%	3,929	37.87%	2,778	26.77%
1996	4,401	46.46%	3,988	42.10%	1,084	11.44%
2000	7,054	65.71%	3,524	32.83%	157	1.46%
2004	9,225	70.67%	3,751	28.74%	77	0.59%
2008	9,264	70.25%	3,811	28.90%	113	0.86%
2012	9,132	75.82%	2,752	22.85%	161	1.34%
2016	10,108	77.93%	2,547	19.64%	315	2.43%
2020	11,926	79.87%	2,860	19.15%	145	0.97%
2024	13,669	81.82%	2,919	17.47%	118	0.71%

United States Senate election results for Hill County, Texas1
Year	Republican		Democratic		Third party(ies)	
Year	No.	%	No.	%	No.	%
2024	13,104	78.66%	3,223	19.35%	331	1.99%

United States Senate election results for Hill County, Texas2
Year	Republican		Democratic		Third party(ies)	
Year	No.	%	No.	%	No.	%
2020	11,845	79.89%	2,688	18.13%	294	1.98%

Texas Gubernatorial election results for Hill County
Year	Republican		Democratic		Third party(ies)	
Year	No.	%	No.	%	No.	%
2022	9,418	82.72%	1,830	16.07%	137	1.20%

== Education ==
School districts include:

- Abbott Independent School District
- Aquilla Independent School District
- Axtell Independent School District
- Blum Independent School District
- Bynum Independent School District
- Covington Independent School District
- Dawson Independent School District
- Frost Independent School District
- Grandview Independent School District
- Hillsboro Independent School District
- Hubbard Independent School District
- Itasca Independent School District
- Malone Independent School District
- Milford Independent School District
- Mount Calm Independent School District
- Penelope Independent School District
- Rio Vista Independent School District
- West Independent School District
- Whitney Independent School District

The entire county is in the service area of Hill College, according to the Texas Education Code.

== See also ==
- National Register of Historic Places listings in Hill County, Texas
- Recorded Texas Historic Landmarks in Hill County
