= Penelope High School =

Location
- 309 Avenue D Penelope, Texas 76676; United States; 31.861512°N 96.930646°W

Information
- School type: Public high school
- School district: Penelope Independent School District
- Principal: Sherry Hueske
- Teaching staff: 19.00 (FTE)
- Grades: PK-12
- Enrollment: 212 (2023–2024)
- Student to teacher ratio: 11.16
- Colors: Red & White
- Athletics conference: UIL Class A
- Mascot: Wolverine
- Website: Penelope High School website

Penelope High School is a 1A public high school located in Penelope, Texas (USA). It is part of the Penelope Independent School District located in north central Hill County. In 2011, the school was rated "Academically Acceptable" by the Texas Education Agency.

== Athletics ==
The Penelope Wolverines compete in the following sports:

- Basketball
- Cross Country
- 6-Man Football
- Track and Field
- Volleyball

The school and town were chronicled in the book "Where Dreams Die Hard" by Carlton Stowers, which follows the school football team for an entire season (after dropping the sport for 40 years, the school resumed play in 2000). In 2007, Penelope made the football playoffs for the first time in school history, though it lost in the first round.

=== State Titles ===
- One Act Play -
  - 1976(B), 1981(1A)
