= Abbott, Texas =

Abbott
- City
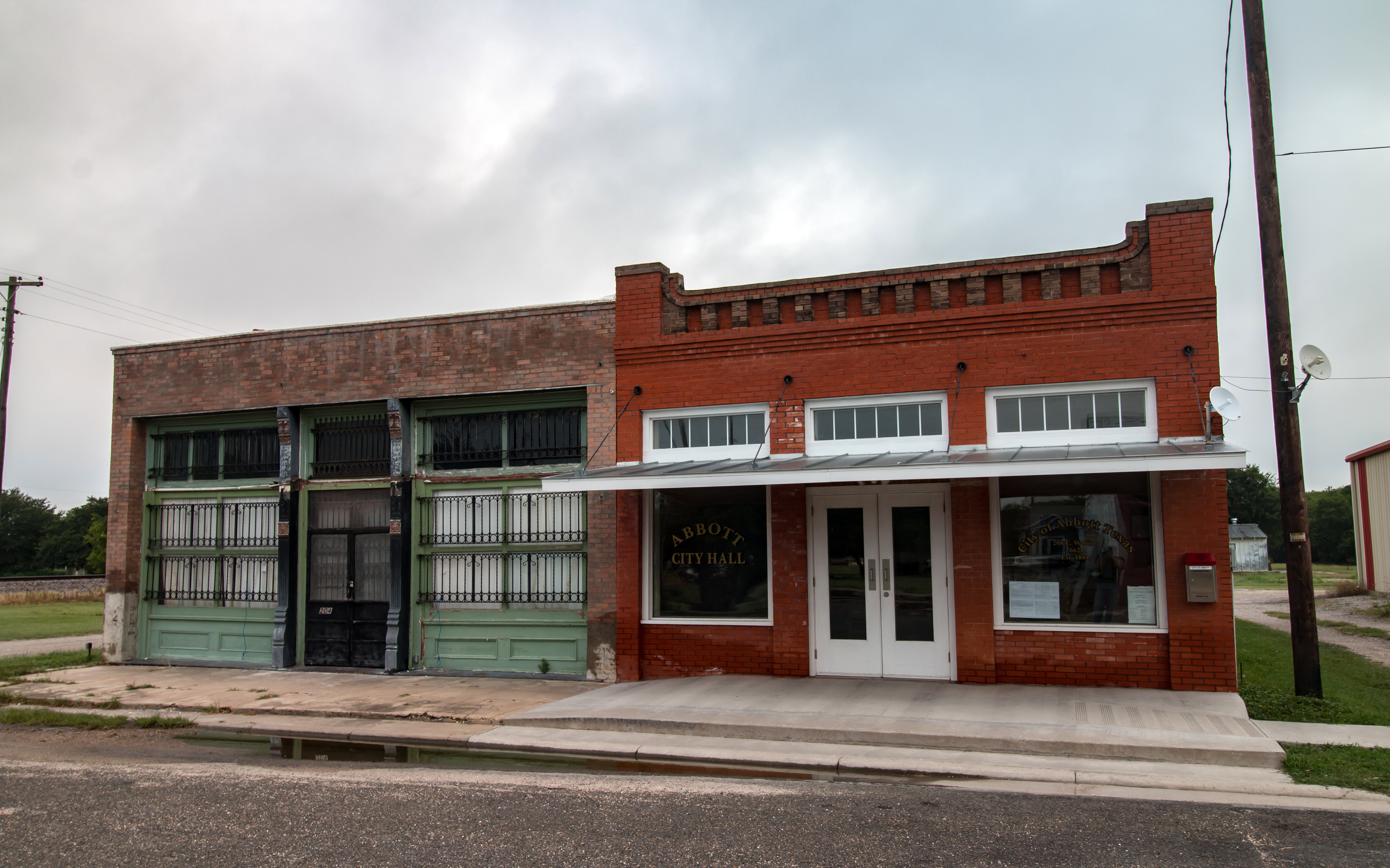
- Abbott City Hall
- Interactive map of Abbott
- Location of Abbott in the state of Texas Location of Abbott in the United States
- Coordinates: 31°53′02″N 97°04′27″W
- Country: United States
- State: Texas
- County: Hill
- Named after: Joseph "Jo" Abbott

Area
  - Total: 0.59 sq mi (1.54 km^{2})
  - Land: 0.59 sq mi (1.53 km^{2})
  - Water: 0 sq mi (0.00 km^{2})
- Elevation: 712 ft (217 m)

Population (2020)
  - Total: 352
  - Density: 623.5/sq mi (240.74/km^{2})
- Time zone: UTC-6 (Central (CST))
  - Summer (DST): UTC-5 (CDT)
- ZIP code: 76621
- Area code: 254
- FIPS code: 48-00100
- GNIS feature ID: 2409653

Abbott is a city in Hill County, Texas, United States. It is 24.7 miles (39.8 km) north of Waco, along Interstate 35. The population was 352 in 2020.

== History ==
Abbott was founded in 1871 as a stop for the Missouri-Kansas-Texas Railroad and was named for Joseph "Jo" Abbott, who represented the area in the Texas House of Representatives at the time. Its population peaked at 713 in 1914 and has declined since. The city was incorporated in 1916.

== Geography and climate ==
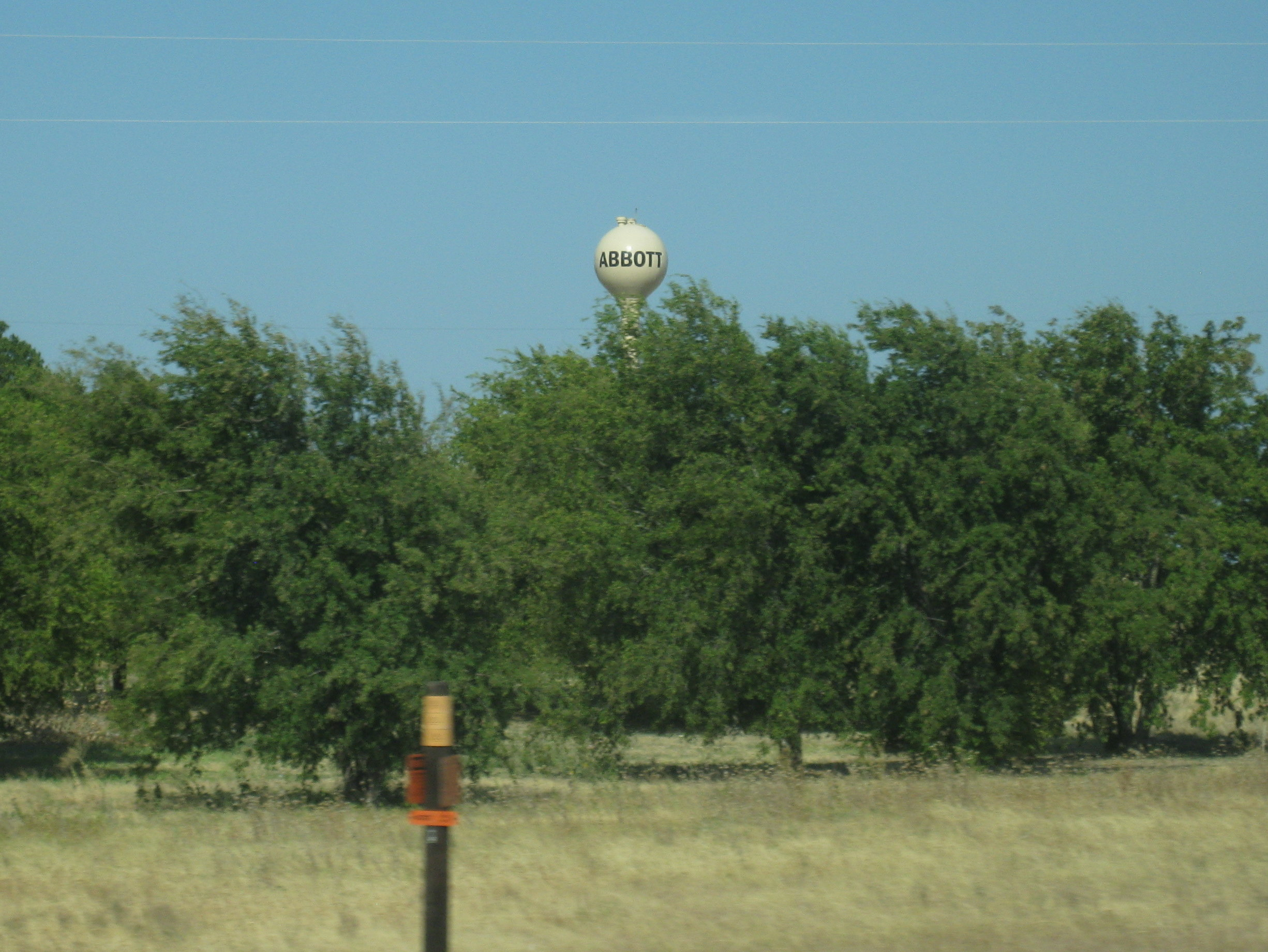
View from I-35

Abbott is located on Interstate 35, approximately 24 miles north of Waco. According to the United States Census Bureau, the city has a total area of 0.6 square miles (1.6 km^{2}).

The city has a humid subtropical climate (Köppen climate classification Cfa), similar to nearby cities such as Dallas and Waco.

== Demographics ==
Historical population
Census	Pop.	Note	%±
1910	713		—
1920	303		−57.5%
1930	326		7.6%
1940	264		−19.0%
1950	345		30.7%
1960	289		−16.2%
1970	375		29.8%
1980	359		−4.3%
1990	314		−12.5%
2000	321		2.2%
2010	356		10.9%
2020	352		−1.1%

=== 2020 census ===
As of the 2020 census, Abbott had a population of 352. The median age was 37.0 years. 25.6% of residents were under the age of 18 and 18.8% of residents were 65 years of age or older. For every 100 females there were 109.5 males, and for every 100 females age 18 and over there were 111.3 males age 18 and over.

0% of residents lived in urban areas, while 100.0% lived in rural areas.

There were 127 households in Abbott, of which 36.2% had children under the age of 18 living in them. Of all households, 56.7% were married-couple households, 19.7% were households with a male householder and no spouse or partner present, and 19.7% were households with a female householder and no spouse or partner present. About 20.4% of all households were made up of individuals and 9.4% had someone living alone who was 65 years of age or older.

There were 141 housing units, of which 9.9% were vacant. Among occupied housing units, 89.8% were owner-occupied and 10.2% were renter-occupied. The homeowner vacancy rate was 0.9% and the rental vacancy rate was <0.1%.

Racial composition as of the 2020 census
Race	Percent
White	81.5%
Black or African American	2.6%
American Indian and Alaska Native	0%
Asian	0.3%
Native Hawaiian and Other Pacific Islander	0%
Some other race	5.1%
Two or more races	10.5%
Hispanic or Latino (of any race)	13.4%

=== 2010 census ===
In 2010 Abbott had a population of 356. The racial and ethnic makeup was 91.0% non-Hispanic white, 2.0% black or African American, 1.1% Native American, 0.3% Asian, 0.3% reporting two or more races and 6.5% Hispanic or Latino.

=== 2000 census ===
As of the census of 2000, there were 300 people, 124 households, and 89 families residing in the city. The population density was 518.0 inhabitants per square mile (200.0/km^{2}). There were 144 housing units at an average density of 248.6 per square mile (96.0/km^{2}). The racial makeup of the city was 96.00% White, 1.00% African American, 3.00% from other races. Hispanic or Latino of any race were 5.67% of the population.

There were 124 households, out of which 29.8% had children under the age of 18 living with them, 62.9% were married couples living together, 6.5% had a female householder with no husband present, and 28.2% were non-families. 27.4% of all households were made up of individuals, and 16.9% had someone living alone who was 65 years of age or older. The average household size was 2.42 and the average family size was 2.97.

In the city, the population was spread out, with 21.3% under the age of 18, 6.7% from 18 to 24, 28.3% from 25 to 44, 20.3% from 45 to 64, and 23.3% who were 65 years of age or older. The median age was 40 years. For every 100 females, there were 87.5 males. For every 100 females age 18 and over, there were 88.8 males.

The median income for a household in the city was $37,917, and the median income for a family was $55,625. Males had a median income of $38,750 versus $20,000 for females. The per capita income for the city was $19,062. About 6.0% of families and 8.2% of the population were below the poverty line, including 2.7% of those under the age of 18 and 13.0% of those 65 or over.

== Education ==
The City of Abbott is served by the Abbott Independent School District and home to the Abbott High School Panthers. In 2015 there were 300 students in Pre-Kindergarten through 12th grade.

== Notable people ==
- Bobbie Nelson (1931-2022), Willie Nelson's sister; pianist
- Willie Nelson (born 1933), American singer-songwriter and actor
