= Peoria, Texas =

Unincorporated community in Texas, US

Peoria
- Unincorporated community
- Location in Texas
- Coordinates: 31°58′42″N 97°13′19″W
- Country: United States
- State: Texas
- County: Hill
- Named for: Peoria, Illinois
- Elevation: 659 ft (201 m)

Population (2000)
  - Total: 81
- GNIS feature ID: 1343839

Peoria is an unincorporated community in Hill County, Texas, United States.

== History ==
Peoria is situated on the intersection of Texas State Highway 22 and Farm to Market Road 1947. It began as a rest stop for cattle drovers. Settler B. F. Stewart named the town after his hometown, Peoria, Illinois. In 1853, one square mile of road was laid out. A post office operated from 1856 to 1907, with Henry Young serving as the first postmaster. The population continued to decline, and as of 2000, had a population of 81.
