= Aquilla, Texas =

- City
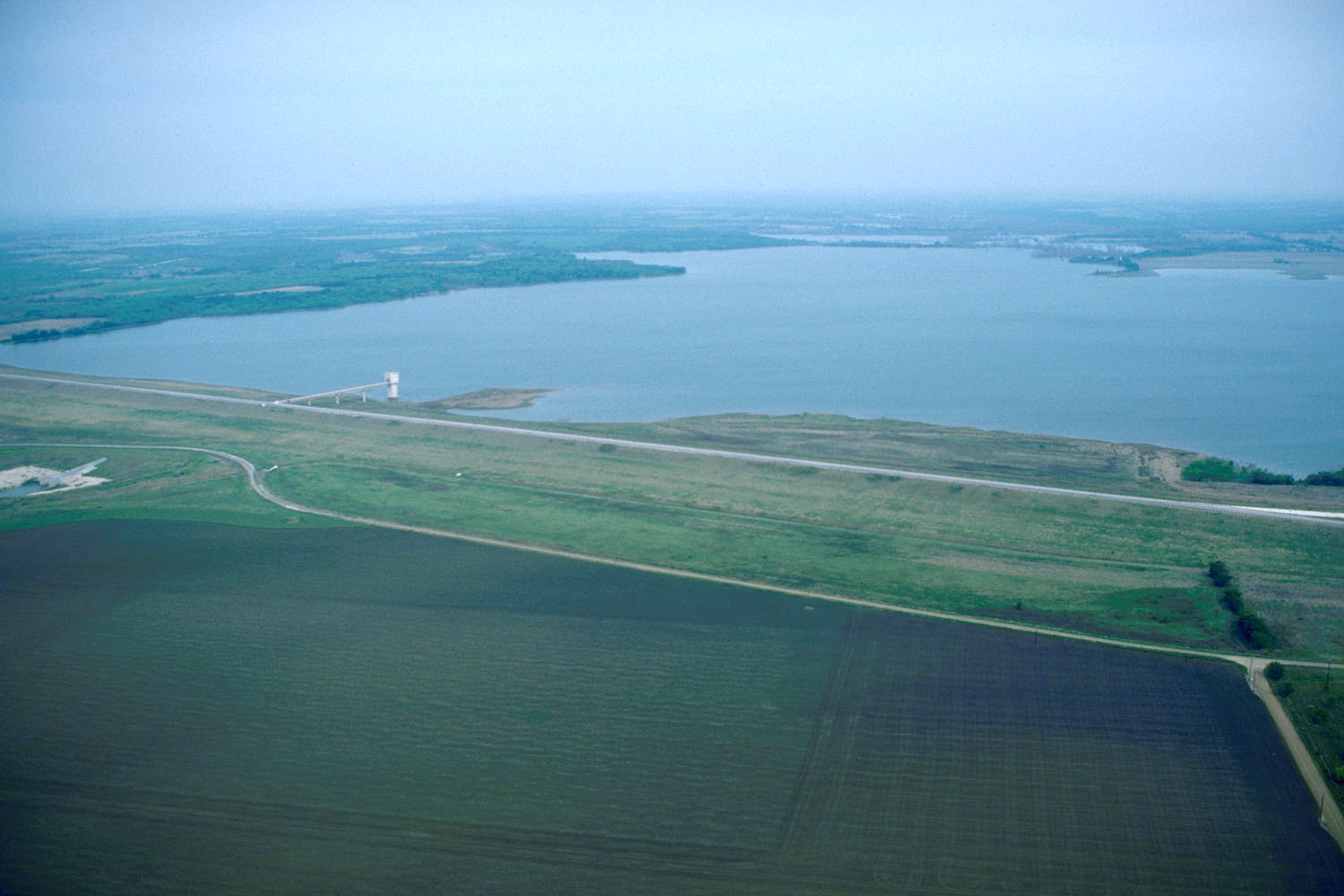
- Aquilla Lake is located a few miles north of Aquilla.
- Interactive map of Aquilla, Texas
- Coordinates: 31°51′17″N 97°13′12″W
- Country: United States
- State: Texas
- County: Hill

Area
  - Total: 0.28 sq mi (0.73 km^{2})
  - Land: 0.28 sq mi (0.73 km^{2})
  - Water: 0 sq mi (0.00 km^{2})
- Elevation: 522 ft (159 m)

Population (2020)
  - Total: 101
  - Density: 358.1/sq mi (138.28/km^{2})
- Time zone: UTC-6 (Central (CST))
  - Summer (DST): UTC-5 (CDT)
- ZIP code: 76622
- Area code: 254
- FIPS code: 48-03588
- GNIS feature ID: 2409720
- Website: www.cityofaquilla.com

Aquilla (/əˈkwɪlə/ ə-KWIL-ə) is a city located in Hill County, Texas, United States. It is located on Farm to Market Road 933, 16 miles (26 km) southwest of Hillsboro. The population was 101 at the 2020 census.

== History ==
From the Handbook of Texas Online:

"Settlers, attracted to the site because it was the nearest point to Hillsboro where timber could be found, began moving into the area in the 1840s. The original settlement, near the site of present Aquilla, was called Mudtown. The community of Aquilla and nearby Aquilla Creek were probably named for early settler Aquilla Jones. The town received a post office in 1859. Twenty years later the tracks of the Texas Central Railroad crossed southwestern Hill County, passing within a few miles of the timber settlement. Shortly thereafter, businesses and residents moved a few miles south to the rail line. The community's population was 175 in 1886 and 100 in 1892. A series of illnesses resulted from drinking creek water, so a well was dug in 1897 to provide fresh water. One of the state's first chartered banks opened at Aquilla in 1905, when the town also had a health spa. In 1910 the population surpassed 200. By 1914 it had a population of over 500 and thirteen retail stores, three hotels, four churches, a school, a newspaper, a bank, and a thriving lumber company. By the late 1950s there were 250 residents and ten businesses in Aquilla. In 2000 there were thirteen businesses and 136 residents."

In 2017 there were 109 residents and two churches.

== Geography ==
Aquilla is located in southwestern Hill County 9 miles (14 km) west of Interstate 35, 26 miles (42 km) north of Waco, and 72 miles (116 km) south of Fort Worth.

According to the United States Census Bureau, Aquilla has an area of 0.3 square miles (0.7 km^{2}), all land.

== Demographics ==
Historical population
Census	Pop.	Note	%±
1880	42		—
1970	115		—
1980	130		13.0%
1990	136		4.6%
2000	136		0.0%
2010	109		−19.9%
2020	101		−7.3%
U.S. Decennial Census

=== 2020 census ===
As of the 2020 census, Aquilla had a population of 101. The median age was 39.9 years. 27.7% of residents were under the age of 18 and 14.9% of residents were 65 years of age or older. For every 100 females there were 124.4 males, and for every 100 females age 18 and over there were 102.8 males age 18 and over.

0% of residents lived in urban areas, while 100.0% lived in rural areas.

There were 40 households in Aquilla, of which 55.0% had children under the age of 18 living in them. Of all households, 62.5% were married-couple households, 17.5% were households with a male householder and no spouse or partner present, and 5.0% were households with a female householder and no spouse or partner present. About 12.5% of all households were made up of individuals and 5.0% had someone living alone who was 65 years of age or older.

There were 40 housing units, of which 0% were vacant. Among occupied housing units, 77.5% were owner-occupied and 22.5% were renter-occupied. The homeowner vacancy rate was <0.1% and the rental vacancy rate was <0.1%.

Racial composition as of the 2020 census
Race	Percent
White	94.1%
Black or African American	0%
American Indian and Alaska Native	0%
Asian	3.0%
Native Hawaiian and Other Pacific Islander	0%
Some other race	1.0%
Two or more races	2.0%
Hispanic or Latino (of any race)	5.0%

=== 2000 census ===
As of the census of 2000, there were 136 people, 43 households, and 39 families residing in the city. The population density was 488.4 inhabitants per square mile (188.6/km^{2}). There were 51 housing units at an average density of 183.1 per square mile (70.7/km^{2}). The racial makeup of the city was 83.82% White, 7.35% Native American, 8.09% from other races, and 0.74% from two or more races. Hispanic or Latino of any race were 11.76% of the population.

There were 43 households, out of which 53.5% had children under the age of 18 living with them, 74.4% were married couples living together, 11.6% had a female householder with no husband present, and 9.3% were non-families. 7.0% of all households were made up of individuals, and 4.7% had someone living alone who was 65 years of age or older. The average household size was 3.16 and the average family size was 3.28.

In the city, the population was spread out, with 33.8% under the age of 18, 10.3% from 18 to 24, 29.4% from 25 to 44, 16.2% from 45 to 64, and 10.3% who were 65 years of age or older. The median age was 31 years. For every 100 females, there were 109.2 males. For every 100 females age 18 and over, there were 104.5 males.

The median income for a household in the city was $39,500, and the median income for a family was $43,750. Males had a median income of $37,708 versus $17,500 for females. The per capita income for the city was $13,096. There were none of the families and 5.8% of the population living below the poverty line, including no under eighteens and 23.5% of those over 64.

== Education ==
The city is served by the Aquilla Independent School District.

== See also ==
- Aquilla Lake, 4 miles (6 km) north of Aquilla
