= Woodbury, Texas =

Unincorporated community in Texas, US

Woodbury
- Unincorporated community
- Location in Texas
- Coordinates: 32°02′59″N 97°13′51″W
- Country: United States
- State: Texas
- County: Hill
- Elevation: 663 ft (202 m)

Population (2000)
  - Total: 40
- GNIS feature ID: 1350520

Woodbury is an unincorporated community in Hill County, Texas, United States.

== History ==
Woodbury is situated on Farm to Market Road 309. The town was first settled by Anglo-American settlers c. 1850, and was established in 1858 offered property in the town for sale. More settlers arrived following the American Civil War. A post office opened in 1871. The community grew until the 1930s, when it was bypassed by railroads. As of 2000, the town had a population of 40.
