= Lovelace, Texas =

Unincorporated community in Texas, US

Lovelace
- Unincorporated community
- Location in Texas
- Coordinates: 32°05′21″N 97°07′43″W
- Country: United States
- State: Texas
- County: Hill
- Elevation: 643 ft (196 m)

Population (2000)
  - Total: 12
- GNIS feature ID: 1340664

Lovelace is an unincorporated community in Hill County, Texas, United States.

== History ==
Lovelace is situated near Farm to Market Road 2959. It was settled after the American Civil War, by J. M. Loveless and brothers William A. and Q. S., after their service in the Confederate States Army. The Missouri–Kansas–Texas Railroad put a railroad switch on his property, and named the property in his honor, but misspelled Loveless as Lovelace. A post office operated from 1893 to 1908, and the town grew until the 1930s. As of 2000, the population is 12.
