= Abbott High School =

Coordinates: 31°52′58″N 97°4′36″W

Location
- 219 S First St; Abbott, Texas 76621-0226; United States

Information
- School type: Public high school
- School district: Abbott Independent School District
- CEEB code: 440000
- NCES School ID: 480738000006
- Principal: Randall Miller
- Faculty: 24.43 (on full-time equivalent (FTE) basis)
- Grades: PK-12
- Enrollment: 284 (2023-2024)
- Student to teacher ratio: 11.63
- Campus type: Rural
- Colors: Black & Old Gold
- Athletics conference: UIL Class A
- Mascot: Panthers/Lady Panthers
- Website: Abbott High School

Abbott High School is a public high school located in Abbott, Texas (USA) and classified as a 1A school by the UIL. It is part of the Abbott Independent School District located in southern Hill County. In 2015, the school was rated "Met Standard" by the Texas Education Agency.

== Athletics ==
The Abbott Panthers compete Cross Country, Volleyball, Six-man football, Basketball, Golf, Tennis, Track, and Baseball.

=== State titles ===
- Volleyball
  - 1978(1A), 1979(1A)
- Football
  - 2015(1A-D1)
- Baseball
  - 2017(1A), 2023(1A)

== Notable alumni ==
- Willie Nelson - country singer is a 1950 graduate of Abbott High School
