= SS Penelope =

A number of steamships were named Penelope, including:

- SS Penelope (1941), a Norwegian and Finnish cargo ship in service 1946–72
- SS Penelope (1945), a Liberian cargo ship in service 1956–64
