= Aquilla Lake =

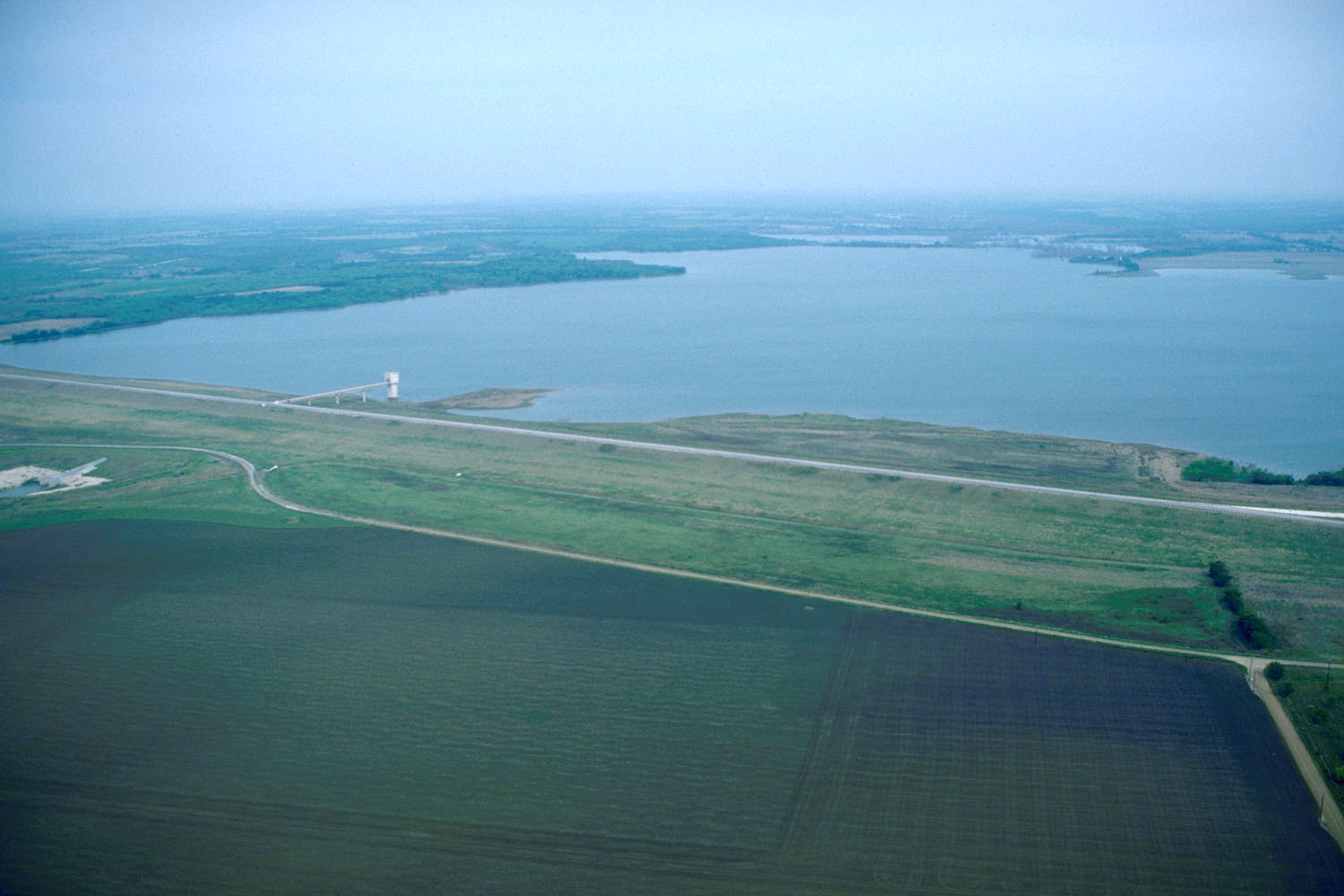
- Aquilla Dam and Lake

- Location within Texas Location within the United States
- Location: Hill County, Texas
- Coordinates: 31°54′34″N 97°12′12″W
- Type: reservoir
- Primary inflows: Aquilla Creek, Hackberry Creek
- Primary outflows: Aquilla Creek
- Catchment area: 255 sq mi (660 km^{2})
- Basin countries: United States
- Surface area: 3,280 acres (1,330 ha)
- Average depth: 59.5 ft (18.1 m)
- Water volume: 54,400 acre⋅ft (67,100,000 m^{3}) (normal conservation pool); 146,000 acre⋅ft (180,000,000 m^{3}) (flood pool)
- Surface elevation: 537 ft (163.7 m) (normal conservation pool); 556 ft (169.5 m) (flood pool)

Aquilla Lake is an artificial lake (reservoir) in Hill County, Texas, USA. The dam was constructed by the U.S. Army Corps of Engineers. The dam is part of the overall flood control project in the Brazos River basin. The lake is located approximately 23 miles (37 km) north of Waco, Texas, and directly north of the town of Aquilla.

The dam was built and is owned by the U.S. Army Corps of Engineers. The lake is formed by an earthfill dam with a crest length of 11,890 feet (3,624 m) and a top width of 38 feet (11.6 m). A reinforced concrete inlet structure near the center of dam houses the flood-control gates and operating equipment. Closure of the dam began March 20, 1982, and the dam was completed in January 1983. Deliberate impoundment began April 29, 1983. The lake was built for water supply, flood control, and recreation purposes. Figures given herein represent total contents. Data regarding the dam and lake are given in the following table (USGS data):

	Elevation		Capacity	
	(ft)	(m)	(acre-feet)	(million m^{3})
Top of dam	582.5	177.6		
Spillway crest (uncontrolled)	564.5	172.1	213,700	263.6
Top of flood-control pool	556.0	169.5	146,000	180.1
Top of conservation pool	537.5	163.8	52,400	64.6
Invert, lowest gated outlet	503.0	153.3	932	1.1
Record maximum (1991-12-23)	551.9	168.2	119,000	146.8
Record minimum (1983-10-10)	511.3	155.8	4,600	5.7

Recreational activities on the lake include boating, fishing, hunting, and wildlife viewing.

== Fishing ==
Largemouth bass fishing can be good on Aquilla. The combination of stained water, localized cover, and light fishing pressure means there are some big bass to catch but you have to work for them. Fish spinner baits, jig and pork combos, and plastic worms in and around cover. Tree lines, fencerows, and creek channels are good places to start. Crappie are usually found on submerged brushpiles and large isolated trees. Live minnows seem to be the preferred bait. Channel and blue catfish are caught drift fishing flats or on trotlines set around shallow, brushy areas. Shad, cutbait, or bloodbait will all work. White bass are caught trolling small tailspinners, jigs, and spoons across windy flats.

== See also ==
- List of lakes in Texas
