= Bynum Independent School District =

School district in Texas

Coordinates: 31.9683°N 96.9998°W

Location
- Bynum, TX ESC Region 12 USA

District information
- Type: Public
- Grades: Pre-K through 12
- Superintendent: Larry Mynarcik

Students and staff
- Athletic conference: UIL Class A
- Colors: maroon and white

Other information
- Mascot: bulldog
- Website: Bynum ISD

Bynum Independent School District is a public school district based in Bynum, Texas (USA).

Located in Hill County, a small portion of the district extends into Navarro County. Notable unincorporated communities in the district include Brandon and Irene.

The district has one school Bynum High School that serves students in grades pre-kindergarten through twelve.

== Academic achievement ==
In 2009, the school district was rated "academically acceptable" by the Texas Education Agency.

== Special programs ==
=== Athletics ===
Bynum High School plays six-man football.

== See also ==
- List of school districts in Texas
