= Whitney Independent School District =

School district in Texas

Location
- Whitney, TX ESC Region 12 USA

District information
- Type: Public
- Grades: Pre-K through 12
- Superintendent: Todd Southard

Students and staff
- Athletic conference: UIL Class 3A
- District mascot: Wildcat
- Colors: Blue and White

Other information
- Website: www.whitneyisd.org

Whitney Independent School District is a public school district based in Whitney, Texas (USA).

In 2009, the school district was rated "academically acceptable" by the Texas Education Agency.

== Schools ==
- Whitney High (grades 9-12)
- Whitney Middle (grades 6-8)
- Whitney Intermediate (grades 3-5)
- Whitney Elementary (grades PK-2)
