= Aquilla Independent School District =

School district in Texas, US

Location
- 404 N Richards; Aquilla, Texas ESC Region 12 United States
- Coordinates: 31°51′16″N 97°13′7″W

District information
- Type: Independent school district
- Motto: Right Here ... Right Now, Exemplary Bound!
- Grades: Pre-K through 12
- Superintendent: David Edison
- Schools: 2 (2009-10)
- NCES District ID: 4808520

Students and staff
- Students: 263 (2010-11)
- Teachers: 20.93 (2009-10) (on full-time equivalent (FTE) basis)
- Student–teacher ratio: 11.32 (2009-10)
- Athletic conference: UIL Class 1A 6-man Football Division I
- District mascot: Cougars
- Colors: Orange, White

Other information
- TEA District Accountability Rating for 2011-12: Recognized
- Website: Aquilla ISD

Aquilla Independent School District is a public school district based in Aquilla, Texas (US). The district operates one high school, Aquilla High School, that serves students in grades pre-kindergarten through twelve.

== Finances ==
As of the 2010–2011 school year, the appraised valuation of property in the district was $52,154,000. The maintenance tax rate was $0.117 and the bond tax rate was $0.007 per $100 of appraised valuation.

== Academic achievement ==
In 2011, the school district was rated "recognized" by the Texas Education Agency. Thirty-five percent of districts in Texas in 2011 received the same rating. No state accountability ratings will be given to districts in 2012. A school district in Texas can receive one of four possible rankings from the Texas Education Agency: Exemplary (the highest possible ranking), Recognized, Academically Acceptable, and Academically Unacceptable (the lowest possible ranking).

Historical district TEA accountability ratings

- 2011: Recognized
- 2010: Recognized
- 2009: Exemplary
- 2008: Exemplary
- 2007: Recognized
- 2006: Academically Acceptable
- 2005: Academically Acceptable
- 2004: Recognized

== Schools ==
In the 2011–2012 school year, the district had students in two schools.

- Aquilla School (Grades PK-12)
- Hill County JJAEP (Grades 6-12)

== Special programs ==
=== Athletics ===
Aquilla High School participates in the boys sports of baseball, basketball, and football. The school participates in the girls sport of basketball. For the 2012 through 2014 school years, Aquilla High School will play six-man football in Class 1A 6-man Football Division I.

== See also ==
- List of school districts in Texas
- List of high schools in Texas
