= Penelope Independent School District =

School district in Texas

Coordinates: 31.8622°N 96.9306°W

Location
- Penelope, Texas ESC Region 12 United States

District information
- Type: Public
- Grades: Pre-K through 12
- Superintendent: Robert Bray

Students and staff
- Students: About 200
- Staff: 37
- Athletic conference: UIL Class A (six-man football participant)
- District mascot: Wolverine
- Colors: Red and White

Other information
- Website: www.penelopeisd.org

Penelope Independent School District is a public school district based in Penelope, Texas, United States. In addition to Penelope, the district also serves the unincorporated community of Birome. The district has one school, Penelope School, that serves students in prekindergarten through grade 12.

The school and town were chronicled in the book Where Dreams Die Hard by Carlton Stowers, which followed the school football team for an entire season (after dropping the sport for 40 years, the school resumed play in 2000). In 2007, Penelope made the football playoffs for the first time in school history, though it lost in the first round.

== Academic achievement ==
In 2009, the school district was rated "academically acceptable" by the Texas Education Agency.

== Special programs ==
=== Athletics ===
Penelope High School offers six-man football, volleyball, basketball, track and field, and cross country running.

== See also ==
- List of school districts in Texas
