= Malone Independent School District =

School district in Texas

The Malone Independent School District is a public school district located in Malone, Texas (USA).

The district has one campus, Malone Elementary, which serves students in grades pre-kindergarten through eight.

In 2009, the school district was rated "recognized" by the Texas Education Agency.

== Controversy ==
In July 2024, the ACLU of Texas sent Malone Independent School District a letter, alleging that the district's 2023-2024 dress and grooming code appeared to violate the Texas CROWN Act, a state law which prohibits racial discrimination based on hair texture or styles, and asking the district to revise its policies for the 2024-2025 school year.
