= Bynum, Texas =

- Town
- Interactive map of Bynum, Texas
- Coordinates: 31°58′07″N 97°00′05″W
- Country: United States
- State: Texas
- County: Hill

Area
  - Total: 0.14 sq mi (0.35 km^{2})
  - Land: 0.14 sq mi (0.35 km^{2})
  - Water: 0 sq mi (0.00 km^{2})
- Elevation: 653 ft (199 m)

Population (2020)
  - Total: 171
  - Density: 1,276.1/sq mi (492.71/km^{2})
- Time zone: UTC-6 (Central (CST))
  - Summer (DST): UTC-5 (CDT)
- ZIP code: 76631
- Area code: 254
- FIPS code: 48-11656
- GNIS feature ID: 2413144
- Website: bynum.myruralwater.com

Bynum is a town in Hill County, Texas, United States. The population was 171 at the 2020 census.

== Geography ==
Bynum is located in eastern Hill County in Central Texas. Texas State Highway 171 runs through the east side of the town, leading northwest 8 miles (13 km) to Hillsboro, the county seat, and southeast 7 miles (11 km) to Malone.

According to the United States Census Bureau, Bynum has a total area of 0.14 square miles (0.35 km^{2}), all land.

=== Climate ===
The climate in this area is characterized by hot, humid summers and generally mild to cool winters. According to the Köppen Climate Classification system, Bynum has a humid subtropical climate, abbreviated "Cfa" on climate maps.

== Demographics ==
Historical population
Census	Pop.	Note	%±
1980	232		—
1990	192		−17.2%
2000	225		17.2%
2010	199		−11.6%
2020	171		−14.1%
U.S. Decennial Census

As of the census of 2000, there were 225 people, 78 households, and 58 families residing in the town. The population density was 1,540.6 inhabitants per square mile (594.8/km^{2}). There were 85 housing units at an average density of 582.0 per square mile (224.7/km^{2}). The racial makeup of the town was 88.00% White, 5.78% African American, 5.33% from other races, and 0.89% from two or more races. Hispanic or Latino of any race were 10.67% of the population.

There were 78 households, out of which 43.6% had children under the age of 18 living with them, 60.3% were married couples living together, 11.5% had a female householder with no husband present, and 24.4% were non-families. 23.1% of all households were made up of individuals, and 15.4% had someone living alone who was 65 years of age or older. The average household size was 2.88 and the average family size was 3.44.

In the town, the population was spread out, with 32.0% under the age of 18, 7.1% from 18 to 24, 28.0% from 25 to 44, 19.1% from 45 to 64, and 13.8% who were 65 years of age or older. The median age was 32 years. For every 100 females, there were 116.3 males. For every 100 females age 18 and over, there were 101.3 males.

The median income for a household in the town was $21,250, and the median income for a family was $21,875. Males had a median income of $25,625 versus $20,000 for females. The per capita income for the town was $11,640. About 27.5% of families and 33.2% of the population were below the poverty line, including 54.1% of those under the age of eighteen and 16.7% of those 65 or over.

== Education ==
The community of Bynum is served by the Bynum Independent School District and is home to the Bynum High School Bulldogs.
