= Huron, Texas =

Huron
- Unincorporated Community
- Interactive map of Huron
- Location within Texas Huron (the United States)
- Coordinates: 32°2′24″N 97°21′36″W
- Country: United States
- State: Texas
- County: Hill County
- Elevation: 666 ft (203 m)
- Postal code: 76692

Huron is an unincorporated community located along Farm Road 933 in Hill County, Texas, United States.

== History ==
The site was erected sometime after the Civil War and was named after Huron Gist, the local storekeeper's son who arrived into the area and established a general store for farmers. A stone gristmill as well as a church and a three-room schoolhouse were later erected in the community. A request for a post office for the community was sent by Jehu McPherson "Huron" Gist in honor of Gist and was then granted in 1897, in which the post office then closed in 1904. A fire burned down the schoolhouse in 1918 and was then replaced and then upgraded. By the early 1980s, only a business and a school remains in the community.
