= Prairiedale, Texas =

Ghost town in Texas, US

Prairiedale
- Ghost town
- Location in Texas
- Coordinates: 32.08431960°N 97.17778610°W
- Country: United States
- State: Texas
- County: Hill

Prairiedale, also Prairie Dale, is a ghost town in Hill County, Texas, United States.

== History ==
Prairiedale was settled in the latter half of the 1800s. A church was established in 1881, but later moved to Mayfield. It was abandoned by the 1930s.
