= William Briggs & Co. Ltd =

English manufacturer of sewing materials

- Industry: Manufacturing
- Founder: William Briggs
- Headquarters: Manchester, United Kingdom
- Products: Transfers and traced needlework materials, Needlewoman and Needlecraft Journals

William Briggs & Co. Ltd, also known as Wm. Briggs & Co. Ltd. was a manufacturing company that produced needlework patterns and materials for embroidery. They were known for their Penelope line and were one of the largest manufacturers of art needleworks.

== History ==
The company was formed by William Briggs (23 April 1845 – 19 January 1922) was a woolen merchant and later a fancy goods manufacturer. In 1874, his brother John Briggs and Henry Grimshaw applied for a patent for heat-transfer patterns. William used this patented process for transferring embroidery designs. He created the shop Mrs Bidder, Art Needlework Specialist, to sell his products. In the early 1880s, a book of Briggs & Co Patent Transferring Papers was published.

Deighton's and William Briggs & Co. Ltd were involved in a legal dispute over the copyright, as William Deighton of London testified that his transfers predated the Briggs patent.

The Penelope brand was registered in 1886 and produced haberdashery and wools. This was considered the main reason for the company's success.

William Briggs & Co Ltd. was incorporated in 1895 and based in Manchester. They were once the largest manufacturers of art needlework in the world.

The company published Needlewoman and Needlecraft Journal. They also published the books Traditional Embroidery and Jacobean Crewelwork "by Penelope", which were created with Lady Smith-Dorrien.

In 1922, William Briggs died. His three sons Frank, William and Charles all worked for the family business. His daughter Alice Lilian Briggs married Sir Jocelyn Field Thorpe.

In 1939, they joined with J & P Coats Ltd, thread manufacturers from Paisley. During and after the war the continued to make and sell yarns and embroidery kits. During World War II, the Board of Trade licensed William Briggs & Co. Ltd to supply 'Penelope; Needlecraft for H.M. Forces' kits as occupational therapy to injured service personnel recovering in hospital. The kits included instructions, fabric with stencilled design, and stranded threads and was contained in an envelope with a colour illustration of the finished design. Examples of kits are held by the Imperial War Museum and the Paisley Thread Mill Museum.

In 1963, the head of William Briggs & Co. Ltd, Frank Briggs, died. J and P Coats had a controlling share of the business and continued to use the name.

In the 1970s, Briggs took over former rival firm Deighton's. Their embroidery kits continued to be popular during the 1970s and 80s.
