= Penelope, Texas =

- Town
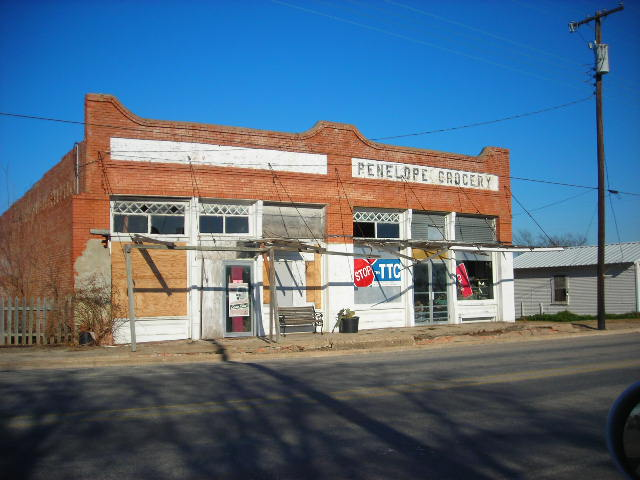
- Downtown Penelope

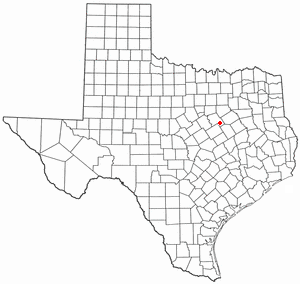
- Location of Penelope, Texas

- Coordinates: 31°51′31″N 96°55′41″W
- Country: United States
- State: Texas
- County: Hill

Area
  - Total: 1.02 sq mi (2.64 km^{2})
  - Land: 0.99 sq mi (2.57 km^{2})
  - Water: 0.027 sq mi (0.07 km^{2})
- Elevation: 571 ft (174 m)

Population (2020)
  - Total: 180
  - Density: 180/sq mi (70/km^{2})
- Time zone: UTC-6 (Central (CST))
  - Summer (DST): UTC-5 (CDT)
- ZIP code: 76676
- Area code: 254
- FIPS code: 48-56672
- GNIS feature ID: 2413124
- Website: cityofpenelopetx.org

Penelope is a town in Hill County, Texas, United States. The population was 180 at the 2020 census.

== Geography ==
Penelope is located in southeastern Hill County in Central Texas. It is 4 miles (6 km) southwest of Malone and 20 miles (32 km) southeast of Hillsboro, the county seat.

According to the United States Census Bureau, Penelope has a total area of 1.0 square mile (2.6 km^{2}), of which 0.03 square miles (0.07 km^{2}), or 2.56%, are water.

== Demographics ==
Historical population
Census	Pop.	Note	%±
1930	211		—
1940	240		13.7%
1950	243		1.3%
1960	226		−7.0%
1970	212		−6.2%
1980	235		10.8%
1990	210		−10.6%
2000	211		0.5%
2010	198		−6.2%
2020	180		−9.1%
U.S. Decennial Census; 2020 Census

As of the census of 2000, 211 people, 84 households, and 53 families resided in the town. The population density was 206.6 inhabitants per square mile (79.8/km^{2}). The 102 housing units averaged 99.9 per square mile (38.6/km^{2}). The racial makeup of the town was 78.67% White, 6.16% African American, 13.74% from other races, and 1.42% from two or more races. Hispanics or Latinos of any race were 25.59% of the population.

Of the 84 households, 35.7% had children under the age of 18 living with them, 50.0% were married couples living together, 9.5% had a female householder with no husband present, and 36.9% were not families. About 35.7% of all households were made up of individuals, and 20.2% had someone living alone who was 65 years of age or older. The average household size was 2.51 and the average family size was 3.36.

In the town, the population was distributed as 27.5% under the age of 18, 8.5% from 18 to 24, 26.5% from 25 to 44, 22.3% from 45 to 64, and 15.2% who were 65 years of age or older. The median age was 38 years. For every 100 females, there were 97.2 males. For every 100 females age 18 and over, there were 86.6 males.

The median income for a household in the town was $31,667, and for a family was $36,875. Males had a median income of $24,286 versus $20,833 for females. The per capita income for the town was $12,739. About 3.5% of families and 11.4% of the population were below the poverty line, including 5.0% of those under the age of 18 and 40.0% of those 65 or over.

== Education ==
The town is served by the Penelope Independent School District and is home to the Penelope High School Wolverines.
