= Malone, Texas =

- Town
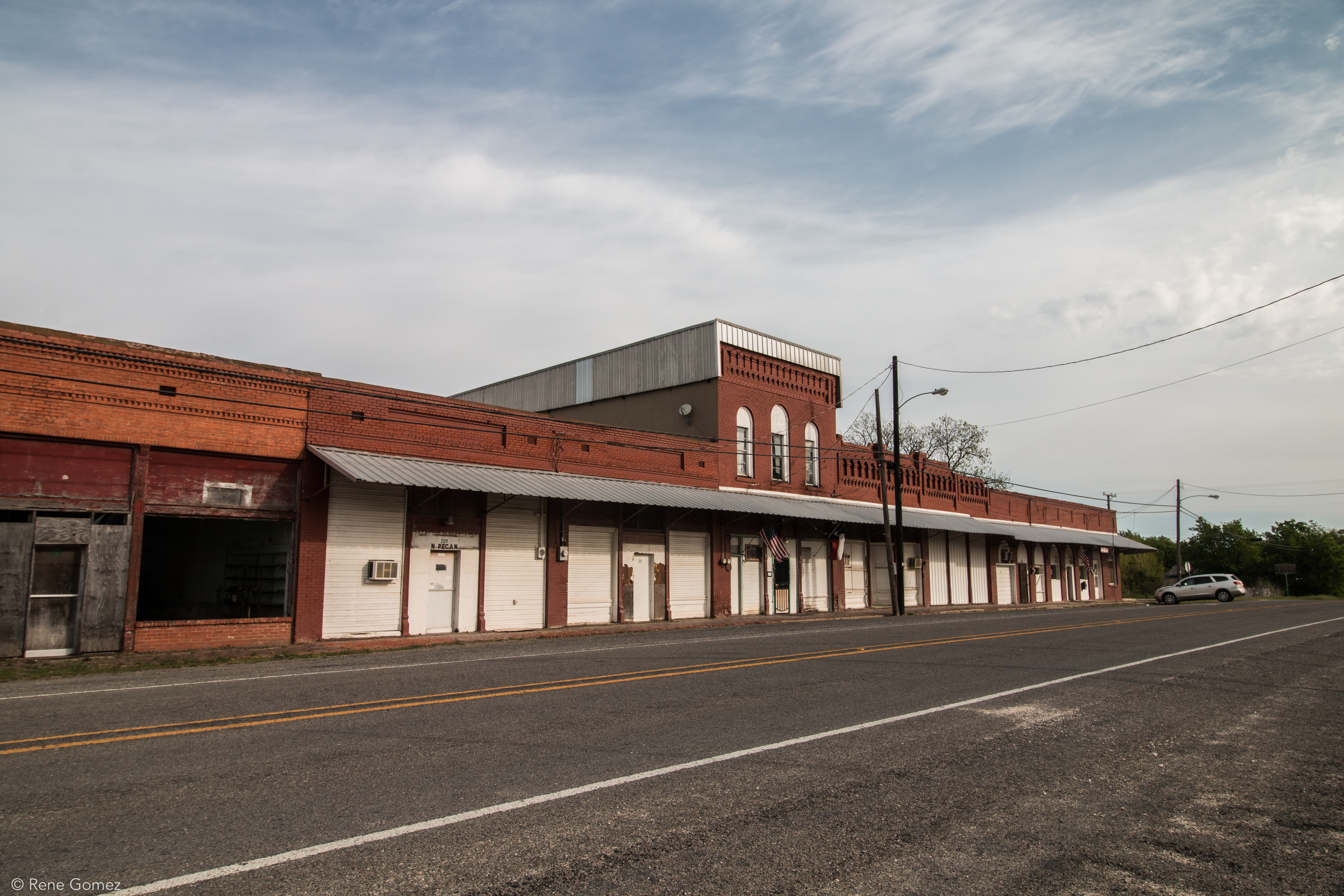
- Downtown Malone

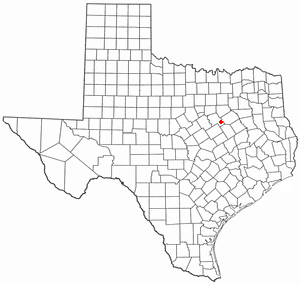
- Location of Malone, Texas

- Coordinates: 31°55′01″N 96°53′41″W
- Country: United States
- State: Texas
- County: Hill

Area
  - Total: 0.46 sq mi (1.19 km^{2})
  - Land: 0.46 sq mi (1.18 km^{2})
  - Water: 0.0039 sq mi (0.01 km^{2})
- Elevation: 479 ft (146 m)

Population (2020)
  - Total: 237
  - Density: 518.6/sq mi (200.23/km^{2})
- Time zone: UTC-6 (Central (CST))
  - Summer (DST): UTC-5 (CDT)
- ZIP code: 76660
- Area code: 254
- FIPS code: 48-46260
- GNIS feature ID: 2412934

Malone is a town in Hill County, Texas, United States. The population was 237 at the 2020 census.

== Geography ==
Malone is located in eastern Hill County in Central Texas. Texas State Highway 171 passes through the center of town, leading northwest 16 miles (26 km) to Hillsboro, the county seat, and southeast 7 miles (11 km) to Hubbard.

According to the United States Census Bureau, Malone has a total area of 0.46 square miles (1.2 km^{2}), of which 1.3 acres (5,149 m^{2}), or 0.43%, are water.

== Demographics ==
Historical population
Census	Pop.	Note	%±
1920	488		—
1930	481		−1.4%
1940	429		−10.8%
1950	352		−17.9%
1960	240		−31.8%
1970	305		27.1%
1980	315		3.3%
1990	306		−2.9%
2000	278		−9.2%
2010	269		−3.2%
2020	237		−11.9%
U.S. Decennial Census

As of the census of 2000, there were 278 people, 107 households, and 69 families residing in the town. The population density was 606.6 inhabitants per square mile (234.2/km^{2}). There were 125 housing units at an average density of 272.7 per square mile (105.3/km^{2}). The racial makeup of the town was 67.99% White, 19.42% African American, 0.72% Native American, 9.71% from other races, and 2.16% from two or more races. Hispanic or Latino of any race were 14.75% of the population.

There were 107 households, out of which 36.4% had children under the age of 18 living with them, 43.0% were married couples living together, 14.0% had a female householder with no husband present, and 35.5% were non-families. 32.7% of all households were made up of individuals, and 15.9% had someone living alone who was 65 years of age or older. The average household size was 2.60 and the average family size was 3.32.

In the town, the population was spread out, with 31.7% under the age of 18, 7.9% from 18 to 24, 29.1% from 25 to 44, 16.5% from 45 to 64, and 14.7% who were 65 years of age or older. The median age was 31 years. For every 100 females, there were 95.8 males. For every 100 females age 18 and over, there were 86.3 males.

The median income for a household in the town was $21,250, and the median income for a family was $26,667. Males had a median income of $30,179 versus $20,208 for females. The per capita income for the town was $11,231. About 27.6% of families and 33.2% of the population were below the poverty line, including 34.7% of those under the age of eighteen and 45.5% of those 65 or over.

== Education ==
The town is served by the Malone Independent School District. The district has one campus, Malone Elementary, which serves students in grades pre-kindergarten through eight.
