= Abbott Independent School District =

School district in Texas, US

Location
- Abbott, Texas ESC Region 12 United States
- Coordinates: 31°52′59″N 97°4′36″W

District information
- Type: Independent school district
- Motto: [A winner never quits and a quitter never wins]
- Grades: Pre-K through 12
- Superintendent: Eric Pustejovsky
- Schools: 2 (2009-10)
- NCES District ID: 4807380

Students and staff
- Students: 297 (2010-2011)
- Teachers: 28.29 (2009-10) (on full-time equivalent (FTE) basis)
- Student–teacher ratio: 10.50 (2009-10)
- Athletic conference: UIL Class 1A 6-man Football Division I
- District mascot: Panthers
- Colors: Black, Gold

Other information
- TEA District Accountability Rating for 2011-12: Recognized
- Website: Abbott ISD

The Abbott Independent School District is a school district based in Abbott, Texas, United States.

== Finances ==
As of the 2010-2011 school year, the appraised valuation of property in the district was $48,305,000. The maintenance tax rate was $0.111 and the bond tax rate was $0.028 per $100 of appraised valuation.

== Academic achievement ==
In 2011, the school district was rated "recognized" by the Texas Education Agency. Thirty-five percent of districts in Texas in 2011 received the same rating. No state accountability ratings will be given to districts in 2012. A school district in Texas can receive one of four possible rankings from the Texas Education Agency: Exemplary (the highest possible ranking), Recognized, Academically Acceptable, and Academically Unacceptable (the lowest possible ranking).

Historical TEA accountability ratings

- 2011: Recognized
- 2010: Exemplary
- 2009: Exemplary
- 2008: Recognized
- 2007: Recognized
- 2006: Recognized
- 2005: Recognized
- 2004: Recognized

== Schools ==
In the 2011-2012 school year, the district had students in two schools.

Regular instructional

- Abbott High School (Grades Pre-K-12)

JJAEP instructional

- Hill County JJAEP (Grades 6-12)

== Special programs ==
=== Athletics ===
Abbott High School participates in the boys sports of baseball, basketball, and football The school participates in the girls sports of basketball, volleyball and softball. For the 2012 through 2014 school years, Abbott High School will play six-man football in UIL Class 1A 6-man Football Division I.

== See also ==
- List of school districts in Texas
- List of high schools in Texas
