= Blum, Texas =

- Town
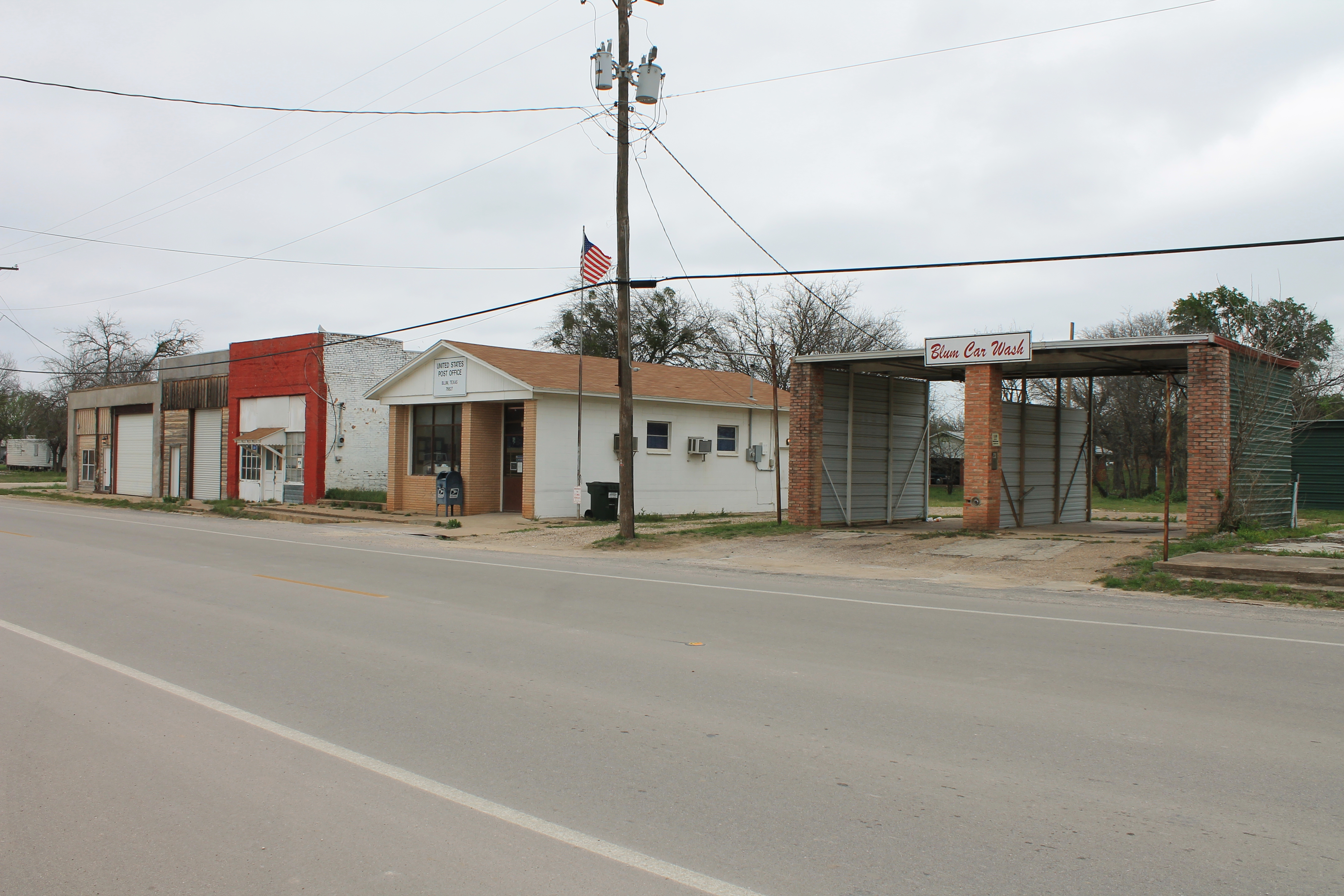
- Interactive map of Blum, Texas
- Coordinates: 32°08′31″N 97°23′50″W
- Country: United States
- State: Texas
- County: Hill

Area
  - Total: 1.01 sq mi (2.61 km^{2})
  - Land: 0.99 sq mi (2.56 km^{2})
  - Water: 0.019 sq mi (0.05 km^{2})
- Elevation: 594 ft (181 m)

Population (2020)
  - Total: 383
  - Density: 387.3/sq mi (149.52/km^{2})
- Time zone: UTC-6 (Central (CST))
  - Summer (DST): UTC-5 (CDT)
- ZIP code: 76627
- Area code: 254
- FIPS code: 48-09004
- GNIS feature ID: 2411702
- Website: cityofblum.org

Blum is a town in Hill County, Texas, United States. Its population was 383 at the 2020 census.

== Geography ==
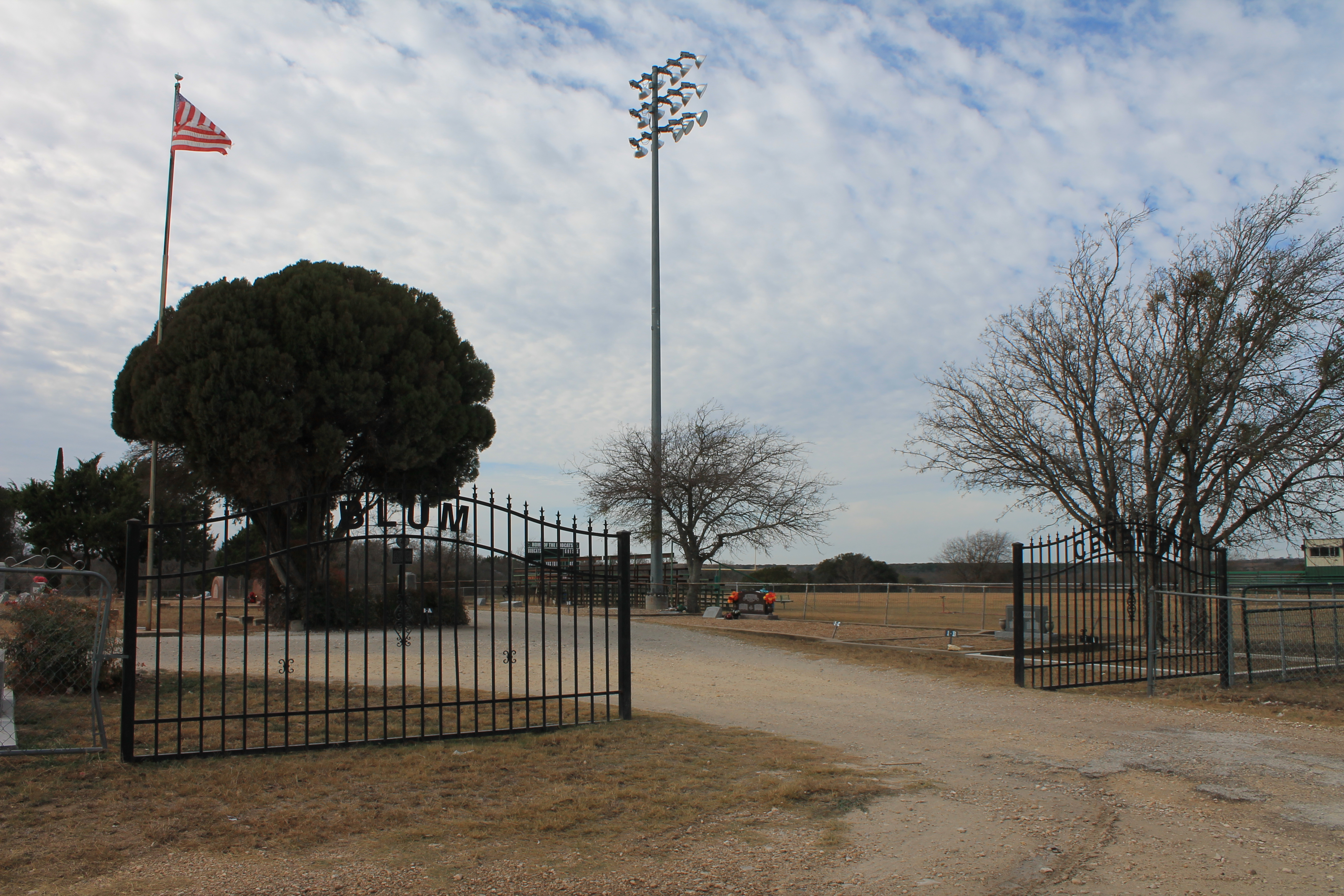
Blum Cemetery

Blum is located in northwestern Hill County at the junction of Farm to Market Highways 67 and 933. It is 22 miles (35 km) northwest of Hillsboro, the county seat, and 15 miles (24 km) south of Cleburne.

According to the United States Census Bureau, the town has a total area of 1.0 square mile (2.6 km^{2}), of which 0.02 square miles (0.05 km^{2}), or 1.87%, is covered by water. The Nolan River flows through the northern and western sides of the town, running southwest to the Brazos River in Lake Whitney.

== Demographics ==
Historical population
Census	Pop.	Note	%±
1920	496		—
1930	403		−18.7%
1940	441		9.4%
1950	368		−16.6%
1960	315		−14.4%
1970	382		21.3%
1980	357		−6.5%
1990	358		0.3%
2000	399		11.5%
2010	444		11.3%
2020	383		−13.7%
U.S. Decennial Census

As of the 2000 census, 399 people, 147 households, and 110 families resided in the town. The population density was 395.8 inhabitants per square mile (152.8/km^{2}). The 177 housing units had an average density of 175.6 per square mile (67.8/km^{2}). The racial makeup of the town was 92.73% White, 0.50% African American, 0.50% Native American, 3.51% from other races, and 2.76% from two or more races. Hispanics or Latinos of any race were 8.52% of the population.

Of the 147 households, 40.8% had children under 18 living with them, 60.5% were married couples living together, 8.8% had a female householder with no husband present, and 24.5% were not families. About 22.4% of all households were made up of individuals, and 10.9% had someone living alone who was 65 or older. The average household size was 2.71 and the average family size was 3.17.

In the town, the age distribution was 32.8% under 18, 7.3% from 18 to 24, 26.8% from 25 to 44, 20.1% from 45 to 64, and 13.0% who were 65 or older. The median age was 31 years. For every 100 females, there were 102.5 males. For every 100 females 18 and over, there were 92.8 males.

The median income for a household in the town was $31,094 and for a family was $40,521. Males had a median income of $30,250 versus $22,708 for females. The per capita income for the town was $11,459. About 13.9% of families and 15.9% of the population were below the poverty line, including 19.3% of those under 18 and 16.7% of those 65 or over.

== Education ==
The town is served by the Blum Independent School District.

== Notable person ==
- Jim Joseph Carmichall, former member of the Texas House of Representatives
