= Blum Independent School District =

School district in Texas

Coordinates: 32°08′19″N 97°23′49″W

Location
- Blum, TX ESC Region 12 USA

District information
- Type: Independent school district
- Grades: Pre-K through 12
- Superintendent: Elsa Scott
- Schools: 3 (2009-10)
- NCES District ID: 4810650

Students and staff
- Students: 358 (2010-11)
- Teachers: 34.43 (2009-10) (on full-time equivalent (FTE) basis)
- Student–teacher ratio: 10.89 (2009-10)
- Athletic conference: UIL Class 1A 6-man Football Division I
- District mascot: Bobcats
- Colors: Green, Gold

Other information
- TEA District Accountability Rating for 2011-12: Recognized
- Website: Blum ISD

Blum Independent School District is a public school district based in Blum, Texas, United States. The district operates one high school, Blum High School.

== Finances ==
As of the 2010–2011 school year, the appraised valuation of property in the district was $136,883. The maintenance tax rate was $0.117 and the bond tax rate was $0.021 per $100 of appraised valuation.

== Academic achievement ==
In 2011, the school district was rated "recognized" by the Texas Education Agency. Thirty-five percent of districts in Texas in 2011 received the same rating. No state accountability ratings will be given to districts in 2012. A school district in Texas can receive one of four possible rankings from the Texas Education Agency: Exemplary (the highest possible ranking), Recognized, Academically Acceptable, and Academically Unacceptable (the lowest possible ranking).

Historical district TEA accountability ratings

- 2011: Recognized
- 2010: Exemplary
- 2009: Academically Acceptable
- 2008: Academically Acceptable
- 2007: Academically Acceptable
- 2006: Academically Acceptable
- 2005: Academically Acceptable
- 2004: Academically Acceptable

== Schools ==
In the 2011–2012 school year, the district had students in three schools.
Regular instructional

- Blum High School (Grades 6–12)
- Blum Elementary School (Grades PK-5).

JJAEP instructional

- Hill County JJAEP

== Athletics ==
- Boys
  - Baseball
  - Basketball
  - Football
  - Wrestling.
- Girls
  - Basketball
  - Volleyball

For the 2012 through 2014 school years, Blum played six-man football in UIL Class 1A 6-man Football Division I.

=== State titles ===
- Football
  - 2019(1A/D1) Six Man
- Volleyball
  - 2022(1A), 2023(1A), 2025(1A)

==== State Finalists ====
- Volleyball
  - 2021(1A)

== See also ==
- List of school districts in Texas
- List of high schools in Texas
