= SS Andromachi =

History
- Name: Empire Favour (1945–47); Epsom (1947–50); Tharros (1950); Errington Court (1950–56); Penelope (1956–64); Andromachi (1964–76)
- Owner: Ministry of War Transport (1945); Ministry of Transport (1945–47); Britain Steamship co (1947–50); Tharros Shipping Ltd (1950); Court Line Ltd (1950–56); Cia. de Nav. Penelope SA (1956–61); Dalia Cia. Nav. SA (1961–76)
- Operator: Clarke & Service Ltd (1945–47); Watts, Watts & Co Ltd (1947–50); John Livens & Sons Ltd (1950); Haldin & Phillips Ltd (1950–56); Cia. de Nav. Penelope SA (1956–61); Purvis Shipping (1961–69)
- Port of registry: Dundee, United Kingdom (1945–47); London, United Kingdom (1947–56); Monrovia, Liberia (1956–64); Andros, Greece (1964–76)
- Builder: Caledon Shipbuilding & Engineering Co Ltd
- Yard number: 411
- Launched: 22 August 1945
- Completed: November 1945
- Out of service: 25 June 1969
- Identification: UK Official Number 188221 (1944–70)
- Fate: Destroyed by fire 1969, scrapped 1976

General characteristics
- Type: Cargo ship
- Tonnage: 7,056 GRT, 4,917 NRT
- Length: 431 feet 3 inches (131.45 m)
- Beam: 56 ft 3 in (17.15 m)
- Draught: 26 ft 9 in (8.15 m)
- Depth: 35 ft 2 in (10.72 m)
- Propulsion: Triple expansion steam engine, single screw propeller

Andromachi was a 7,056 GRT cargo ship that was built as Empire Favour in 1945 by Caledon Shipbuilding & Engineering Co Ltd, Dundee for the Ministry of War Transport (MoWT). She was sold in 1947 and renamed Epsom. Sales in 1950 saw her renamed Tharros and Errington Court. In 1956, she was sold to Liberia and renamed Penelope. A further sale in 1961 saw her renamed Andromachi. She was set afire at Suez in June 1969 during the War of Attrition and was abandoned. The wreck was scrapped in 1976.

== Description ==
Caledon Shipbuilding & Engineering Company Ltd, Dundee, United Kingdom built the ship in 1944 as yard number 411.

The ship was 431 feet 3 inches (131.45 m) long, with a beam of 56 feet 3 inches (17.15 m). She had a depth of 35 feet 2 inches (10.72 m) and a draught of 26 feet 9 inches (8.15 m). She was assessed at 7,056 GRT, 4,917 NRT.

The ship was propelled by a triple expansion steam engine, which had cylinders of 23.5 inches (60 cm), 38 inches (97 cm) and 66 inches (170 cm) diameter by 45 inches (110 cm) stroke. The engine was built by Duncan Steward & Co Ltd, Glasgow. It drove a single screw propeller.

== History ==
The ship was built by Caledon Shipbuilding & Engineering Company Ltd, Dundee, United Kingdom. She was launched on 22 August 1945 and completed in November. Built for the MOWT, she was placed under the management of Clarke & Service. Her United Kingdom official number was 188221 and her port of registry was Dundee.

Empire Favour was sold in 1947 to the Britain Steamship Co Ltd and was renamed Epsom. She was operated under the management of Watts, Watts & Co Ltd. Her port of registry was London. In 1950. Epsom was sold to Tharros Shipping Co Ltd and was renamed Tharros. She was operated under the management of John Livens & Sons Ltd., London. Later that year, Epsom was sold to Court Line, renamed Errington Court, and placed under the management of Haldin & Phillips Ltd.

In 1956, Errington Court was sold to Cia. de Nav. Penelope SA., Monrovia, Liberia and renamed Penelope. In 1961, she was sold to Dalia Cia. Nav. SA., Piraeus, Greece and was renamed Andromachi. She was operated under the management of the Purvis Shipping Co. Ltd., London. She was transferred to the Greek flag in 1964, her port of registry was Andros. During the War of Attrition, she was damaged by Israeli shelling at Suez, Egypt on 25 June 1969 and set afire. The wreck was abandoned. It was scrapped in 1976 at Adabiya, Egypt.
