= List of Farm to Market Roads in Texas (300–399) =

- Texas Farm to Market Road and Ranch to Market Road markers

Highway names
- Interstates: Interstate Highway X (IH-X, I-X)
- US Highways: U.S. Highway X (US X)
- State: State Highway X (SH X)
- Loops: Loop X
- Spurs: Spur X
- Recreational: Recreational Road X (RE X)
- Farm or Ranch to Market Roads: Farm to Market Road X (FM X); Ranch to Market Road X (RM X)
- Park Roads: Park Road X (PR X)

System links
- Highways in Texas; Interstate; US; State; Former; Toll; Loops; Spurs; FM/RM; Park; Rec

Farm to Market Roads in Texas are owned and maintained by the Texas Department of Transportation (TxDOT).

== FM 300 ==
Farm to Market Road 300
- Location: Hockley and Cochran counties
- Length: 14.559 mi (23.430 km)
- Existed: June 15, 1945–present

Farm to Market Road 300 (FM 300) is a 14.6-mile-long (23.5 km) route in Hockley and Cochran counties. It begins at an intersection with FM 1780 south of Whiteface and heads east. About six miles (9.7 km) east of its western terminus, FM 303 intersects the route from the north and travels concurrent with it for about one mile (1.6 km) before exiting to the south. FM 300 continues east for approximately 5.5 miles (8.9 km) before entering the city of Levelland and curving to the northeast.

As it enters the city, the road becomes known as Clubview Drive. In Levelland, Clubview Drive intersects Avenue H; at this intersection, FM 300 enters from the west on Clubview Drive and exits to the north on Avenue H, while US 385 enters from the south on Avenue H and exits to the east on Clubview Drive. The FM 300 designation continues north through Levelland on Avenue H for one mile (1.6 km), passing west of a lake before ending at Bus. SH 114 (Houston Street).

FM 300 was first designated on June 15, 1945. It originally began at SH 51 in rural Terry County and went west, then north, passing through Sundown before traveling northwestward to Levelland and then east to SH 51. On February 24, 1953, the section that connected the route to SH 51 was transferred to FM 211. At the same time, the designation absorbed some of FM 402 and all of FM 847 and was extended southeast through the ghost town of Gomez to US 62. Then, on February 10, 1966, the portion of the route from US 62 to west of Levelland was transferred to FM 303, while all of FM 1634 was transferred to FM 300.

Junction list

County	Location	mi	km	Destinations	Notes
Cochran		0.0	0.0	FM 1780 – Seagraves, Whiteface	
Hockley		6.1	9.8	FM 303 north	West end of FM 303 overlap
Hockley		7.1	11.4	FM 303 south – Sundown	East end of FM 303 overlap
Hockley	Levelland	13.5	21.7	US 385 – Littlefield, Brownfield, South Plains College	
Hockley	Levelland	14.6	23.5	Bus. SH 114 (Houston Street)	
1.000 mi = 1.609 km; 1.000 km = 0.621 mi: Concurrency terminus

== FM 301 ==
Farm to Market Road 301
- Location: Hockley and Cochran counties
- Length: 16.141 mi (25.976 km)
- Existed: June 15, 1945–present

Farm to Market Road 301 (FM 301) is located in Hockley and Cochran counties.

FM 301 begins at an intersection with Cochran County Road 227. The highway runs through a largely rural area of the county and intersects FM 1780 before entering Hockley County. The highway passes by many oil wells for the next 7 miles (11 km). FM 301 runs through the town of Sundown, where it is known as Richardson Street, and intersects FM 303. After leaving Sundown, the highway returns to a rural route before ending at US 385.

FM 301 was designated on June 15, 1945, from FM 300 (now FM 303) in Sundown to the Cochran–Hockley county line. On March 20, 1946, FM 301 was extended 0.5 miles (0.80 km) into Cochran County. On August 1, 1946, FM 301 was extended east to SH 51 (now US 385). On July 14, 1949, FM 301 was extended westward 2.5 miles (4.0 km) to its current western terminus.

Junction list

County	Location	mi	km	Destinations	Notes
Cochran		0.0	0.0	County Road 227	
Cochran		2.5	4.0	FM 1780 – Whiteface, Seagraves	
Hockley	Sundown	9.6	15.4	FM 303 (Slaughter Avenue)	
Hockley		16.1	25.9	US 385 – Levelland, Brownfield	
1.000 mi = 1.609 km; 1.000 km = 0.621 mi

== FM 302 ==
Farm to Market Road 302
- Location: Lamb County
- Length: 5.007 mi (8.058 km)
- Existed: June 11, 1945–present

Farm to Market Road 302 (FM 302) is located in Lamb County. It runs from US 70 east of Earth northward 5 miles (8.0 km) to a road intersection.

FM 302 was designated on June 11, 1945, from US 70 east of Earth northward 2.0 miles (3.2 km) to Spring Lake School at what would be designated as FM 2901 on May 6, 1964. On December 3, 1953, FM 302 was extended northward 3.0 miles (4.8 km) miles to its current terminus.

== FM 303 ==
Farm to Market Road 303
- Location: Gaines, Terry, Hockley, Lamb, and Castro counties
- Length: 121.249 mi (Note: The certified length given is shorter than the actual mileage, as the Texas Department of Transportation description of FM 303 considers it to be discontinuous at rather than concurrent with US 62/385, FM 300 and SH 114.) (195.131 km)
- Existed: June 11, 1945–present

Farm to Market Road 303 (FM 303) is a 121-mile-long (195 km) route in the South Plains region. FM 303 runs from US 180 between Seminole and Lamesa to FM 145 in southwest Castro County.

FM 303 begins at an intersection with US 180 in southeastern Gaines County. The highway runs north to Loop where it intersects with SH 83. FM 303 continues traveling north and enters into Terry County. The highway begins an overlap with FM 213 about 2 miles (3.2 km) south of Wellman. The two highways run through the town together, with FM 303 leaving that overlap and beginning an overlap with US 62/US 385. About 4 miles (6.4 km) northeast of Wellman, FM 303 leaves its overlap with US 62/82 and travels to the north. The highway turns to the west at County Road 941 before turning back to the north at FM 402. FM 303 turns back to the west at FM 211 and turns back to the north at County Road 937 and enters Hockley County about 6 miles (9.7 km) north of here.

In southern Hockley County, FM 303 runs through the town of Sundown where it intersects with FM 301. Approximately 7 miles (11 km) north of Sundown, the highway has a brief overlap with FM 300. The next major intersection is at SH 114, where FM 303 has another overlap. The highway runs through rural areas of Hockley and Lamb counties before entering the town of Sudan, where it meets US 84. FM 303 continues to run through rural areas before entering Castro County, where it ends at an intersection with FM 145.

FM 303 was designated on June 11, 1945, from US 84 in Sudan southward 8.0 miles (12.9 km) miles to Beck. On January 27, 1948, FM 303 was extended south to FM 54. On February 25, 1949, FM 303 was extended north to US 70. On May 23, 1951, FM 303 was extended north 5.2 miles (8.4 km) to the Lamb–Castro county line. On January 29, 1954, FM 303 was extended north and east 3.7 miles (6.0 km) to a road intersection at Dodd. On December 31, 1954, FM 303 was extended south to SH 290 (changed to SH 116 on March 31, 1955, and to part of SH 114 on December 14, 1977), replacing FM 2129. On February 10, 1966, FM 303 was extended south to US 180, replacing all of FM 1635, a section of FM 1634 (current concurrency with FM 300; all of FM 1634 replaced by rerouted FM 300), a section of FM 300, and all of FM 1312. On May 12, 1989, FM 303 was rerouted north over FM 3458 to FM 145, while the section from 2 miles (3.2 km) west of Dodd to Dodd was renumbered as the new FM 3458, effectively causing the routes to swap places.

Junction list

County	Location	mi	km	Destinations	Notes
Gaines		0.0	0.0	US 180 – Seminole, Lamesa	
Gaines		10.1	16.3	FM 1066 east	
Gaines	Loop	14.1	22.7	SH 83 – Seagraves, Welch	
Terry		21.8	35.1	FM 213 east	South end of FM 213 overlap
Terry	Wellman	23.7	38.1	US 62 west / US 385 south / FM 213 west – Seagraves	North end of FM 213 overlap; south end of US 62/385 overlap
Terry		27.8	44.7	US 62 east / US 385 north – Brownfield	North end of US 62/385 overlap
Terry		34.1	54.9	US 82 / US 380 – Plains, Brownfield	
Terry		39.8	64.1	FM 402 south	
Terry		41.9	67.4	FM 2196	
Terry		45.9	73.9	FM 211 east – Meadow	
Hockley		53.5	86.1	FM 41 east – Ropesville	
Hockley	Sundown	59.0	95.0	FM 301 (Richardson Street)	
Hockley		61.9	99.6	FM 1585 west	South end of FM 1585 overlap
Hockley		62.3	100.3	FM 1585 east	North end of FM 1585 overlap
Hockley		66.7	107.3	FM 300 east – Levelland	South end of FM 300 overlap
Hockley		67.6	108.8	FM 300 west	North end of FM 300 overlap
Hockley		70.0	112.7	SH 114 east – Levelland	South end of SH 114 overlap
Hockley		71.4	114.9	SH 114 west – Morton	North end of SH 114 overlap
Hockley		84.6	136.2	FM 597 west – Morton	South end of FM 597 overlap
Hockley		85.7	137.9	FM 597 east – Anton	North end of FM 597 overlap
Lamb		94.3	151.8	FM 54 west – Bula	South end of FM 54 overlap
Lamb		95.4	153.5	FM 54 east – Littlefield	North end of FM 54 overlap
Lamb		100.7	162.1	FM 37 – Bula, Amherst	
Lamb	Sudan	106.0	170.6	FM 298 west – Circle Back	
Lamb	Sudan	106.8	171.9	US 84 – Muleshoe, Littlefield	
Lamb		118.5	190.7	US 70 – Muleshoe, Earth	
Castro		127.4	205.0	FM 3458 east	
Castro		130.7	210.3	FM 145 – Farwell, Hart	
1.000 mi = 1.609 km; 1.000 km = 0.621 mi: Concurrency terminus

== FM 304 ==
Farm to Market Road 304
- Location: Angelina County
- Length: 1.502 mi (2.417 km)
- Existed: September 27, 1960–present

Farm to Market Road 304 (FM 304) is located in Angelina County. It runs from FM 2497 north of Diboll to Pine Valley.

FM 304 was designated on September 27, 1960, along the current route.

=== FM 304 (1945) ===
Farm to Market Road 304
- Location: Lamb and Hockley counties
- Length: 27.2 mi (43.8 km)
- Existed: July 14, 1945–October 24, 1958

A previous route numbered FM 304 was designated on July 14, 1945, from FM 54 in Spade north 7.0 miles (11.3 km) to Hart Camp. On January 27, 1948, the road was extended to the Hockley County line. On December 16, 1948, the road was extended north of Hart Camp 6.1 miles (9.8 km). On July 14, 1949, the road was extended to Spur 9 in Olton. On May 23, 1951, the road was extended to US 84 in Anton. On July 1, 1955, FM 304 was extended to US 70 in Olton, replacing Spur 9. FM 304 was cancelled on October 24, 1958, and transferred to FM 168, although this did not take effect until 1959.

== FM 305 ==
Farm to Market Road 305
- Location: Pecos, Crockett, and Upton counties
- Length: 19.659 mi (31.638 km)
- Existed: June 11, 1945–present

Farm to Market Road 305 (FM 305) is located in Pecos, Crockett, and Upton counties. The 19.6-mile (31.5 km) route begins along US 190 in eastern Pecos County between Bakersfield and Iraan. The road proceeds to the northwest to the Pecos River, where it crosses into Crockett County. FM 305 continues to the northwest through the northwestern corner of Crockett County and enters Upton County shortly before reaching McCamey. In McCamey, the road is known as South Burleson Avenue. The road intersects FM 1901 approaching from the south on the southern edge of the city. In the center of the city, the road crosses the South Orient Rail Line just before terminating at US 67/US 385.

FM 305 was designated on June 11, 1945, from what was then US 290, 12 miles (19 km) east of Bakersfield, to the Pecos River. On June 28, 1945, the road was extended north to the Upton County line. On August 28, 1949, the road was extended northwest to US 67 at McCamey. On December 15, 1977, the section from US 290 to FM 1257 (along with FM 1257 itself) was transferred to US 190.

== FM 306 ==
Farm to Market Road 306
- Location: Comal County
- Length: 31.612 mi (50.875 km)
- Existed: May 23, 1951–present

Farm to Market Road 306 (FM 306) is located in Comal County. The highway runs from US 281 northwest of Canyon Lake and travels in an eastern/southeastern direction to FM 1101 in New Braunfels.

The current FM 306 was designated on May 23, 1951, running from US 81 (now FM 1101) near New Braunfels northward to a road intersection at a distance of 9.4 miles (15.1 km). The highway was extended 4.8 miles (7.7 km) northwestward to Sattler on December 18, 1951. On May 21, 1953, the highway was reduced by 2.0 miles (3.2 km) to the Guadalupe River due to the construction of the Canyon Lake Dam. FM 306 was extended 4.0 miles (6.4 km) northwestward on November 24, 1959. The highway was extended 2.0 miles (3.2 km) to FM 484 on June 2, 1967, and then to Cranes Mill Road 13 days later, absorbing FM 3007. On November 25, 1975, FM 306 was extended 4.0 miles (6.4 km) west of Cranes Mill Road. The highway was extended 5.0 miles (8.0 km) westward to US 281 on September 28, 1977. On May 27, 2010, the road was extended east to FM 1101 (resulting in cancellation of the parallel FM 483).

Junction list

The entire route is in Comal County.

Location	mi	km	Destinations	Notes
Spring Branch	0.0	0.0	US 281 north – Blanco, San Antonio	Western terminus; T intersection
Canyon Lake	9.2	14.8	RM 484 north – Fischer	T intersection
Canyon Lake	12.0	19.3	FM 3424 north – RM 32	
Canyon Lake	18.7	30.1	FM 2673 west – Sattler, Startzville	T intersection
New Braunfels	29.4	47.3	FM 1102 east – Hunter; East Common Street west	
New Braunfels	30.6	49.2	I-35 north – Austin, San Antonio	I-35 exit 191
New Braunfels	31.6	50.9	FM 1101 south – Zorn, New Braunfels	Eastern terminus; roadway continues as Barbarosa Road
1.000 mi = 1.609 km; 1.000 km = 0.621 mi	31.6	50.9		

=== FM 306 (1945) ===
Farm to Market Road 306
- Location: Midland County
- Existed: June 11, 1945–April 30, 1947

FM 306 was previously designated in Midland County on June 11, 1945, from US 80 (now I-20) in Midland north to the Martin County line. FM 306 was cancelled on April 30, 1947, and became a portion of SH 349.

== FM 307 ==
Farm to Market Road 307
- Location: Midland County
- Length: 17.163 mi (27.621 km)
- Existed: June 11, 1945–present

Farm to Market Road 307 (FM 307) is located in Midland County. It runs from I-20 to SH 137.

FM 307 was designated on June 11, 1945, from SH 158 east of Midland, east 14.1 miles (22.7 km). On July 14, 1949, the road was extended east 4.1 miles (6.6 km) to a road intersection. On February 27, 1990, the road was rerouted to run from Lamesa Road in Midland east to SH 137. On June 27, 1995, the section from Lamesa Road to I-20 was transferred to Urban Road 307 (UR 307). This section reverted to FM 307 with the elimination of the Urban Road system on November 15, 2018.

Junction list

The entire route is in Midland County.

Location	mi	km	Destinations	Notes
Midland	0.0	0.0	Lamesa Road to SH 140	
Midland	2.5	4.0	I-20 west	I-20 exit 140
Greenwood	10.1	16.3	FM 1379 south	
	17.2	27.7	SH 137 – Stanton, Big Lake	
1.000 mi = 1.609 km; 1.000 km = 0.621 mi

== FM 308 ==
Farm to Market Road 308
- Location: McLennan, Hill, and Ellis counties
- Length: 51.188 mi (Note: The certified length given is shorter than the actual mileage, as the Texas Department of Transportation description of FM 308 considers it to be discontinuous at rather than concurrent with US 77.) (82.379 km)
- Existed: June 18, 1945–present

Farm to Market Road 308 (FM 308) is located in McLennan, Hill, and Ellis counties. It runs from FM 933 to US 77 in Milford, and then from US 77 northeast of Milford to FM 66 south of Maypearl, with a spur connection in Birome. There is a concurrency with US 77.

FM 308 was designated on June 18, 1945, from Mertens to Irene. On January 25, 1948, the road was extended to US 81 (now I-35) in Elm Mott, replacing FM 311 and FM 435. On January 26, 1948, the road was extended to SH 22, replacing Spur 56. On January 18, 1952, a spur connection to Birome was added. On June 24, 1952, a spur connection to Irene was added, replacing Spur 193. On November 19, 1953, the road was extended north to US 77 in Milford, replacing FM 1882. On November 1, 1956, the road was rerouted in Mertens; the old route was transferred to Spur 314. On March 24, 1958, the road was extended from US 77 to a road intersection, replacing FM 1386 and creating a concurrency with US 77. On September 27, 1960, the road was extended northwest to FM 66. On November 25, 1975, the road was extended southwest to FM 933. On November 7, 1980, the spur connection to Irene was transferred to FM 1604. On June 27, 1995, the section from FM 933 to I-35, was transferred to Urban Road 308 (UR 308). This section reverted to FM 308 with the elimination of the Urban Road system on November 15, 2018.

Junction list

County	Location	mi	km	Destinations	Notes
McLennan		0.0	0.0	FM 933 – Gholson, Waco	
McLennan	Elm Mott	3.0	4.8	I-35 / US 77 – Fort Worth, Dallas, Waco	I-35 exit 343
McLennan	Leroy	9.7	15.6	FM 2311 to SH 31 – Tours, West	
Hill	Birome	16.3	26.2	FM Spur 308 – Birome	
Hill		16.8	27.0	FM 339 – West, Mount Calm	
Hill	Penelope	19.8	31.9	FM 2114 west – West	South end of FM 2114 overlap
Hill	Penelope	20.1	32.3	FM 2114 east – Hubbard	North end of FM 2114 overlap
Hill	Malone	24.5	39.4	SH 171 – Hillsboro, Hubbard	
Hill	Irene	29.7	47.8	FM 1946 east – Pelham	South end of FM 1946 overlap
Hill	Irene	29.9	48.1	FM 1946 west – Bynum	North end of FM 1946 overlap
Hill	Mertens	34.8	56.0	SH 22 – Hillsboro, Corsicana	
Ellis	Milford	40.5	65.2	US 77 south – Hillsboro	South end of US 77 overlap
Ellis		41.5	66.8	US 77 north – Waxahachie	North end of US 77 overlap
Ellis		52.3	84.2	FM 66 – Itasca, Waxahachie	
1.000 mi = 1.609 km; 1.000 km = 0.621 mi: Concurrency terminus

== FM 309 ==
Farm to Market Road 309
- Location: Hill County
- Length: 12.141 mi (19.539 km)
- Existed: June 18, 1945–present

Farm to Market Road 309 (FM 309) is located in Hill County. The highway travels from SH 22 west of Hillsboro northwestward to FM 934.

FM 309 was designated on June 18, 1945, running from SH 22 to Woodbury. The highway was extended to FM 934 on January 24, 1955.

== FM 310 ==
Farm to Market Road 310
- Location: Hill County
- Length: 9.439 mi (15.191 km)
- Existed: June 18, 1945–present

Farm to Market Road 310 (FM 310) is located in Hill County. The highway begins at FM 933 near Aquilla Lake and travels northeastward to I-35 south of Hillsboro.

FM 310 was designated on June 18, 1945, running from US 81 (now I-35) southwestward to Aquilla. On November 21, 1956, the highway was extended 0.1 miles (0.16 km) to FM 1244 in Aquilla. A spur connection in Aquilla was added on October 31, 1957. On March 28, 1985, FM 310 was rerouted along the Aquilla Dam over old FM 3370 with the section of road south of Aquilla Lake and the spur connection being transferred to new FM 3370.

The entire route is in Hill County.

Location	mi	km	Destinations	Notes
	0.0	0.0	FM 933 – Whitney, Aquilla	
	0.9	1.4	FM 3370 south – Aquilla	
Vaughn	4.4	7.1	FM 1947 north – Peoria	
	9.4	15.1	I-35 (US 77) – Fort Worth, Dallas, Waco	I-35 exit 364A
1.000 mi = 1.609 km; 1.000 km = 0.621 mi

== FM 311 ==
Farm to Market Road 311
- Location: Comal County
- Length: 7.940 mi (12.778 km)
- Existed: May 23, 1951–present

Farm to Market Road 311 (FM 311) is located in Comal County. The highway begins at SH 46 east of Bulverde and travels in a northwestern direction through the Smithson Valley region of Canyon Lake, intersecting FM 3159, before ending at US 281 in Spring Branch.

The current FM 311 was designated on May 23, 1951, along the current route.

=== FM 311 (1945) ===
Farm to Market Road 311
- Location: Hill County
- Existed: June 18, 1945–November 23, 1948

A previous route numbered FM 311 was designated on June 18, 1945, from Malone to Birome in Hill County. FM 311 was cancelled on January 25, 1948, and became a portion of FM 308.

== FM 312 ==
Farm to Market Road 312
- Location: Wood County
- Length: 17.397 mi (27.998 km)
- Existed: June 11, 1945–present

Farm to Market Road 312 (FM 312) is located in Wood County. The highway runs from FM 49 northward to SH 11 in Winnsboro.

FM 312 was designated on June 11, 1945, running from Winnsboro to East Point. The highway was extended to SH 154 on December 16, 1947. FM 312 was extended to FM 49 on November 20, 1951.

Junction list

The entire route is in Wood County.

Location	mi	km	Destinations	Notes
Pine Mills	0.0	0.0	FM 49 – Hainesville, Mineola, Shady Grove	
Little Hope	3.2	5.1	SH 154 – Quitman, Gilmer	
East Point	8.5	13.7	FM 2088 – Oak Grove, Perryville	
Winnsboro	16.8	27.0	FM 515 / FM 852 east	South end of FM 852 overlap
Winnsboro	17.4	28.0	SH 11 / FM 852 west	North end of FM 852 overlap
1.000 mi = 1.609 km; 1.000 km = 0.621 mi: Concurrency terminus

== FM 313 ==
Farm to Market Road 313
- Location: Cameron County
- Length: 1.749 mi (2.815 km)
- Existed: May 23, 1951–present

Farm to Market Road 313 (FM 313) is located in the city of Brownsville in Cameron County. The south–north route runs along Minnesota Avenue from SH 4 to SH 48.

FM 313 was designated on May 23, 1951, along the current route. On June 27, 1995, the entire route was redesignated Urban Road 313 (UR 313). The designation reverted to FM 313 with the elimination of the Urban Road system on November 15, 2018.

=== FM 313 (1945) ===
Farm to Market Road 313
- Location: Henderson County
- Existed: June 11, 1945–December 3, 1948

A previous route numbered FM 313 was designated in Henderson County on June 11, 1945, from US 175 near LaRue to half a mile northeast of New York. It was extended to SH 31 near Brownsboro on October 25, 1947. FM 313 was cancelled on December 3, 1948, and became a portion of FM 314 (now FM 607).

== FM 314 ==
Farm to Market Road 314
- Location: Van Zandt and Henderson counties
- Length: 29.336 mi (Note: The certified length given is shorter than the actual mileage, as the Texas Department of Transportation description of FM 314 considers it to be discontinuous at rather than concurrent with FM 279.) (47.212 km)
- Existed: June 11, 1945–present

Farm to Market Road 314 (FM 314) is located in Van Zandt and Henderson counties. The highway begins at FM 315 south of Moore Station and travels northward to FM 16 in Van. Between Moore Station and Antioch, FM 314 crosses over the western tip of Lake Palestine.

FM 314 was designated on June 11, 1945, running from Brownsboro to Van via Edom. The highway was extended southward to Larue on December 3, 1948, absorbing FM 313. On November 20, 1951, FM 314 south of Brownsboro was rerouted to the east, with the old route numbered FM 607 on December 10, 1951. The highway was extended 9.2 miles (14.8 km) southward to FM 315 on December 17, 1952.

Junction list

County	Location	mi	km	Destinations	Notes
Henderson		0.0	0.0	FM 315 – Poynor, Chandler	
Henderson	Antioch, Henderson County	6.0	9.7	FM 317 – Leagueville, Chandler	
Henderson		8.0	12.9	FM 3079 east	
Henderson	Brownsboro	12.6	20.3	SH 31 – Athens, Tyler	
Van Zandt	Edom	17.5	28.2	FM 279 west – Ben Wheeler	South end of FM 279 overlap
Van Zandt	Edom	17.7	28.5	FM 279 east – Tyler	North end of FM 279 overlap
Van Zandt		20.2	32.5	SH 64 – Canton, Tyler	
Van Zandt		24.4	39.3	FM 858 west – Ben Wheeler	
Van Zandt	Van	28.2	45.4	I-20 – Dallas, Longview	I-20 exit 540
Van Zandt	Van	29.5	47.5	FM 16 – Canton, Lindale	
1.000 mi = 1.609 km; 1.000 km = 0.621 mi: Concurrency terminus

== FM 315 ==
Farm to Market Road 315
- Location: Henderson, Anderson, and Van Zandt counties
- Length: 44.253 mi (71.218 km)
- Existed: June 11, 1945–present

Farm to Market Road 315 (FM 315) is located in Henderson, Anderson, and Van Zandt counties. The highway begins at SH 155 in Palestine and travels northward to FM 279 west of Tyler. The highway crosses over Lake Palestine twice and runs parallel to the lake between FM 3506 and Chandler.

FM 315 was designated on June 11, 1945, running from Chandler northward to SH 64 (now FM 279). On October 29, 1948, the highway was extended southward to US 175 in Poynor, replacing FM 318. FM 315 was extended south to SH 155 near Palestine on July 14, 1949, absorbing FM 837 (which was reassigned to an extension of this road on May 23, 1951).

Junction list

County	Location	mi	km	Destinations	Notes
Anderson	Palestine	0.0	0.0	SH 155	
Anderson		0.4	0.64	FM 3309 south	
Anderson		5.7	9.2	FM 321 – Montalba	
Anderson		12.3	19.8	FM 837 – Bradford, Frankston	
Henderson	Poynor	21.2	34.1	To US 175 – Athens, Frankston	
Henderson		28.1	45.2	FM 314 north – Moore Station, Brownsboro	
Henderson	Coffee City	30.9	49.7	FM 3506 south	
Henderson		36.3	58.4	FM 317 west – Leagueville	
Henderson		37.5	60.4	FM 3079 west	
Henderson	Chandler	40.7	65.5	SH 31 – Athens, Tyler	
Henderson	Chandler	41.3	66.5	FM 2010 north – Edom	
Van Zandt		44.3	71.3	FM 279 – Edom, Tyler	
1.000 mi = 1.609 km; 1.000 km = 0.621 mi

== FM 316 ==
Farm to Market Road 316
- Location: Van Zandt and Henderson counties
- Length: 15.276 mi (Note: The certified length given is shorter than the actual mileage, as the Texas Department of Transportation description of FM 316 considers it to be discontinuous at rather than concurrent with US 175.) (24.584 km)
- Existed: June 11, 1945–present

Farm to Market Road 316 (FM 316) is located in Van Zandt and Henderson counties. The highway runs from SH 198 in Payne Springs to SH 198 north of Eustace.

FM 316 was designated on June 11, 1945, running from Payne Springs to Eustace. The highway was extended southward from Payne Springs to SH 31 in Malakoff on October 25, 1947. FM 316 was extended 3.5 miles (5.6 km) southeast of Malakoff later that day. The highway was extended north of Eustace to SH 198 at Phalba on July 14, 1949. The section of FM 316 from Payne Springs to SH 31 was transferred to FM 90 (now SH 198) and the section south of SH 31 was transferred to FM 2636 on October 30, 1961.

Junction list

County	Location	mi	km	Destinations	Notes
Henderson	Payne Springs	0.0	0.0	SH 198 – Mabank, Malakoff	
Henderson		4.5	7.2	RM 2329 east	
Henderson	Eustace	5.7	9.2	US 175 west – Mabank	South end of US 175 overlap
Henderson	Eustace	6.0	9.7	US 175 east – Athens	North end of US 175 overlap
Henderson	Eustace	6.4	10.3	FM 2709 east	
Henderson		10.5	16.9	FM 1861 east – Walton	
Van Zandt		12.1	19.5	FM 3080 west – Mabank	
Van Zandt		14.6	23.5	FM 1256 east to SH 19	
Van Zandt	Phalba	15.6	25.1	SH 198 – Mabank, Canton	
1.000 mi = 1.609 km; 1.000 km = 0.621 mi: Concurrency terminus

== FM 317 ==
Farm to Market Road 317
- Location: Henderson County
- Length: 18.080 mi (Note: The certified length given is shorter than the actual mileage, as the Texas Department of Transportation description of FM 317 considers it to be discontinuous at rather than concurrent with FM 607.) (29.097 km)
- Existed: June 11, 1945–present

Farm to Market Road 317 (FM 317) is located in Henderson County. The highway runs from SH 31 in Athens eastward to FM 315 near Lake Palestine.

The highway was designated on June 11, 1945, running from SH 31 at Sand Springs eastward at a distance of 2.7 miles (4.3 km). On October 25, 1947, FM 317 was extended 7.0 miles (11.3 km) eastward to Leagueville. The highway was extended 5.3 miles (8.5 km) eastward to FM 314 on November 25, 1956. On October 31, 1957, FM 317 was extended 4.1 miles (6.6 km) eastward to FM 315. The highway was extended westward past SH 31 to another point on SH 31 west of Athens on January 31, 1979, creating a partial beltway around the town. This western extension of FM 317 became part of Loop 7 on January 28, 2005.

Junction list

The entire route is in Henderson County.

Location	mi	km	Destinations	Notes
Athens	0.0	0.0	SH 31 – Tyler, Athens	
	2.8	4.5	FM 2495 west / County Road 3704 – Lake Athens	
	6.4	10.3	FM 1803 north – Blackjack	
Leagueville	9.3	15.0	FM 607 south – Larue	West end of FM 607 overlap
	9.7	15.6	FM 607 north – Brownsboro	East end of FM 607 overlap
Antioch	14.7	23.7	FM 314 – Brownsboro, Poynor	
	18.4	29.6	FM 315 – Chandler, Poynor	
1.000 mi = 1.609 km; 1.000 km = 0.621 mi: Concurrency terminus

== FM 318 ==
Farm to Market Road 318
- Location: Lavaca County
- Length: 15.919 mi (25.619 km)
- Existed: May 23, 1951–present

Farm to Market Road 318 (FM 318) is located in Lavaca County. It runs from US 77 south of Hallettsville, southwestward to FM 531, and from another point on FM 531 to SH 111 in Yoakum.

FM 318 was designated on May 23, 1951, to run from SH 111 in Yoakum northeast 3.7 miles (6.0 km) to a road intersection. On November 21, 1956, the road was extended northeast to FM 531 in Sweet Home. On May 18, 1970, the road was extended northeast to US 77, replacing FM 2763.

=== FM 318 (1945) ===
Farm to Market Road 318
- Location: Henderson County
- Existed: June 11, 1945–October 29, 1948

A previous route numbered FM 318 was designated on June 11, 1945, from Poyner north to Fincastle in Henderson County. FM 318 was cancelled on October 29, 1948, and became a portion of FM 315.

== FM 319 ==
Farm to Market Road 319
- Location: Anderson County
- Length: 8.986 mi (14.462 km)
- Existed: June 11, 1945–present

Farm to Market Road 319 (FM 319) is located in Anderson County. It runs from SH 294 in Elkhart southwest to Parker's Store.

FM 319 was designated on June 11, 1945, along the current route.

== FM 320 ==
Farm to Market Road 320
- Location: Anderson County
- Length: 8.185 mi (13.172 km)
- Existed: June 11, 1945–present

Farm to Market Road 320 (FM 320) is located in Anderson County. It runs from US 79 at Palestine westward to FM 645.

FM 320 was designated on June 11, 1945, along the current route.

== FM 321 ==
Farm to Market Road 321
- Location: Anderson County
- Length: 31.017 mi (49.917 km)
- Existed: June 11, 1945–present

Farm to Market Road 321 (FM 321) is located in Anderson County. It runs from FM 2574 in Neches westward to Yard.

FM 321 was designated on June 11, 1945, to run from SH 19 in Montalba west to US 287 (now Spur 324) in Tennessee Colony. On November 20, 1951, the road was extended west 5.0 miles (8.0 km) to Cooks Store. On October 28, 1953, the road was extended west 4.8 miles (7.7 km) to Yard. On June 28, 1963, the road was extended east to SH 155. On June 2, 1967, the road was extended east to FM 2267 in Neches. On September 26, 1967, the eastern terminus was redescribed as FM 2574 in Neches.

== FM 322 ==
Farm to Market Road 322
- Location: Anderson County
- Length: 14.199 mi (22.851 km)
- Existed: June 11, 1945–present

Farm to Market Road 322 (FM 322) is located in Anderson County. It runs from US 287 in Palestine southward to FM 319.

FM 322 was designated on June 11, 1945, to run from US 287 in Palestine southward 3.6 miles (5.8 km) over the Poor Farm Road to the site of the former Anderson County Poor Farm, which was designated a historic site by the Texas Historical Commission in 1986. On December 10, 1946, the designation was extended south 1.0 mile (1.6 km). On July 14, 1949, FM 322 was extended south 4.5 miles (7.2 km) to SH 294. On May 2, 1962, it was extended south to FM 319.

== FM 323 ==
Farm to Market Road 323
- Location: Anderson County
- Length: 15.938 mi (25.650 km)
- Existed: June 11, 1945–present

Farm to Market Road 323 (FM 323) is located in Anderson County. It runs from US 84 southeast of Palestine southeast to SH 294.

FM 323 was designated on June 11, 1945, to run from US 84 southeast of Palestine southeastward 4.2 miles (6.8 km). On May 23, 1951, the road was extended southeast 7.6 miles (12.2 km) to Alderbranch. On October 28, 1953, the road was extended southeast 5.1 miles (8.2 km) to SH 294.

== FM 324 ==
Farm to Market Road 324
- Location: Angelina County
- Length: 5.664 mi (9.115 km)
- Existed: June 11, 1945–present

Farm to Market Road 324 (FM 324) is located in Angelina County. It runs from SH 94 in Lufkin south to US 59.

FM 324 was designated on June 11, 1945, to run from SH 94 in Lufkin south 2.5 miles (4.0 km) along the Old Diboll Road. On January 13, 1946, the road was extended south 2.0 miles (3.2 km) to US 59. On August 1, 1963, the road was extended south 0.7 miles (1.1 km) to the new route of US 59.

== FM 325 ==
Farm to Market Road 325
- Location: Angelina County
- Length: 3.541 mi (5.699 km)
- Existed: June 11, 1945–present

Farm to Market Road 325 (FM 325) is located in Angelina County. It runs from Bus. US 59 eastward to a road intersection.

FM 325 was designated on June 11, 1945, to run from US 59 (now Bus. US 59) in Lufkin east 2.8 miles (4.5 km) along Ewing Road. On November 25, 1975, the road was extended east 0.8 miles (1.3 km) to a road intersection.

== FM 326 ==
Farm to Market Road 326
- Location: Angelina County
- Length: 10.963 mi (17.643 km)
- Existed: June 11, 1941–present

Farm to Market Road 326 (FM 326) is located in Angelina County. It runs from SH 103 east of Lufkin, south to US 69 in Homer, and from another point on US 69, southward via Bald Hill.

FM 326 was designated on June 11, 1945, to run from US 69 in Homer south 3.3 miles (5.3 km). On October 31, 1958, the road was extended south 3.5 miles (5.6 km) through Bald Hill. On January 8, 1977, the road was extended northward to SH 103, replacing sections of FM 2916 (which FM 1475 was rerouted over the remainder of) and FM 1475.

== FM 327 ==
Farm to Market Road 327
- Location: Bexar County
- Length: 2.345 mi (3.774 km)
- Existed: March 3, 1981–present

Farm to Market Road 327 (FM 327) is located in Bexar County. It runs from Loop 1604 southwest via Elmendorf to another point on Loop 1604.

FM 327 was designated on March 3, 1981, along the current route. It is a former alignment of Loop 1604 in Elmendorf.

=== FM 327 (1945) ===
Farm to Market Road 327
- Location: Angelina County
- Length: 6.7 mi (10.8 km)
- Existed: June 11, 1945–July 24, 1961

A previous route numbered FM 327 was designated in Angelina County on June 11, 1945, from US 69 in Pollok southwest 6.7 miles (10.8 km) to SH 103. This designation was cancelled on July 24, 1961; the section from US 69 to FM 1819 was transferred to SH 7, while the section from FM 1819 to SH 103 became an extension of FM 1819.

== FM 328 ==
Farm to Market Road 328
- Location: Angelina County
- Length: 5.205 mi (8.377 km)
- Existed: June 11, 1945–present

Farm to Market Road 328 (FM 328) is located in Angelina County. It runs from FM 2109 in Huntington northeastward.

FM 328 was designated on June 11, 1945, to run from US 69 in Huntington northeast 6.2 miles (10.0 km). On March 23, 1954, a section was transferred to FM 1669 and the sections on Linn Street and Fifth Street were given to the city of Huntington.

== FM 329 ==
Farm to Market Road 329
- Location: Ellis County
- Length: 0.364 mi (586 m)
- Existed: May 6, 1964–present

Farm to Market Road 329 (FM 329) is located in Ellis County. It runs from I-35E south of Waxahachie east to US 77.

FM 329 was designated on May 6, 1964, along the current route.

=== FM 329 (1945) ===
Farm to Market Road 329
- Location: Angelina County
- Length: 4.0 mi (6.4 km)
- Existed: June 11, 1945–October 28, 1960

A previous route numbered FM 329 was designated on June 11, 1945, from Concord north 4 miles (6.4 km). FM 329 was cancelled on October 28, 1960, because of the relocation of SH 63 due to the construction of Sam Rayburn Reservoir.

== FM 330 ==
Farm to Market Road 330
- Location: Sabine County
- Length: 7.429 mi (11.956 km)
- Existed: June 11, 1945–present

Farm to Market Road 330 (FM 330) is located in Sabine County. It runs from SH 21 in Geneva to SH 87 in Sexton.

FM 330 was designated on June 11, 1945, along the current route.

== FM 331 ==
Farm to Market Road 331
- Location: Austin County
- Length: 11.685 mi (18.805 km)
- Existed: June 16, 1945–present

Farm to Market Road 331 (FM 331) is located in Austin County. It runs from Oil Field Road near Raccoon Bend to SH 36 north of Sealy. There is a brief concurrency with FM 529 near Burleigh.

FM 331 was designated on June 16, 1945, from SH 159 at Bellville to Burleigh. On October 31, 1958, the road was extended to SH 36 southeast of Peters. On April 6, 1970, FM 331 was rerouted; the original route was transferred to FM 529, and a section from Burleigh to Raccoon Bend was added, replacing FM 2916.

== FM 332 ==
Farm to Market Road 332
- Location: Washington County
- Length: 7.573 mi (12.188 km)
- Existed: July 9, 1945–present

Farm to Market Road 332 (FM 332) is located in Washington County. It runs from FM 389 southwest of Brenham to FM 2502 at Wesley.

FM 332 was designated on June 16, 1945, from SH 159 at Nelsonville to Welcome. On May 11, 1953 (connecting section designated April 24), the road was extended to FM 389, replacing FM 1263. On December 16, 1958, the Wesley-Nelsonville section was transferred to FM 2502.

== FM 333 ==
Farm to Market Road 333
- Location: Colorado County
- Length: 11.370 mi (18.298 km)
- Existed: June 13, 1945–present

Farm to Market Road 333 (FM 333) is located in Colorado County. It runs from SH 71 in Garwood southwest to a county road.

FM 333 was designated on June 13, 1945, to run from SH 71 southwest 6.1 miles (9.8 km). The road was extended southwest 3.4 miles (5.5 km) on May 1, 1965, and 2.0 miles (3.2 km) southwest to its current terminus on September 3, 1967.

== RM 334 ==
Ranch to Market Road 334
- Location: Kinney and Uvalde counties
- Length: 29.717 mi (47.825 km)
- Existed: June 11, 1945 (Note: RM 334 was originally designated as FM 334 from 1945 to 1959.)–present

Ranch to Market Road 334 (RM 334) is located in Kinney and Uvalde counties.

RM 334 was designated as Farm to Market Road 334 (FM 334) on June 11, 1945, from US 90 in Brackettville northeastward 11.3 miles (18.2 km) toward Laguna. On November 13, 1946, the road was extended northeast 1.0 mile (1.6 km). On November 23, 1948, a second section from SH 55 in Laguna west to the Uvalde–Kinney county line was designated, creating a gap. The gap was closed on July 15, 1949, when the section from 12.3 miles (19.8 km) northeast of US 90 east to the Uvalde–Kinney county line was designated. FM 334 was redesignated as RM 334 on October 17, 1959.

== RM 335 ==
Ranch to Market Road 335
- Location: Edwards and Real counties
- Length: 28.962 mi (46.610 km)
- Existed: June 11, 1945 (Note: RM 335 was originally designated as FM 335 from 1945 to 1956.)–present

Ranch to Market Road 335 (RM 335) is located in Real and Edwards counties. It originates at its intersection with SH 55 just north of Barksdale. The 29-mile-long (47 km) road's northern terminus is at its intersection with SH 41.

RM 335 was designated on June 11, 1945, as Farm to Market Road 335 (FM 335) from the Edwards County line to Vance. On July 9, 1945, the road was extended south to SH 55 in Barksdale. On April 19, 1956, FM 335 was extended north to SH 41, replacing RM 2378. On October 1, 1956, FM 335 was changed to RM 335.

== RM 336 ==
Ranch to Market Road 336
- Location: Real County
- Length: 26.385 mi (42.463 km)
- Existed: June 11, 1945 (Note: RM 336 was originally designated as FM 336 from 1945 to 1953.)–present

Ranch to Market Road 336 (RM 336) is located in Real County. It begins at an intersection with US 83 just north of Leakey, near the Real County Rodeo Grounds. RM 336 travels north, intersecting RM 3235 at that route's northern terminus, before ending at an intersection with SH 41, for a length of approximately 26.4 miles (42.5 km).

RM 336 was designated as Farm to Market Road 336 (FM 336) on June 11, 1945, from US 83, 0.8 miles (1.3 km) north of Leakey, north 7.4 miles (11.9 km) up the West Frio River. On January 29, 1953 (connecting section designated December 17, 1952), the road was extended north to SH 41, replacing FM 1434, and the designation was changed to RM 336.

== RM 337 ==
Ranch to Market Road 337
- Location: Real and Bandera counties
- Length: 56.101 mi (90.286 km)
- Existed: June 11, 1945 (Note: RM 337 was originally designated as FM 337 from 1945 to 1956.)–present

== FM 338 ==
Farm to Market Road 338
- Location: Collingsworth County
- Length: 27.401 mi (44.098 km)
- Existed: June 11, 1945–present

Farm to Market Road 338 (FM 338) is located in Collingsworth County. It runs from a county road east, northeast, east, and southeast to the Oklahoma state line.

FM 330 was designated on June 11, 1945, from US 83 in Wellington west to Rolla. 12 days later, the road was extended southeast to Dodson. This extension was also part of SH 203 until September 26, 1945. On December 17, 1952, the road was extended east to the Oklahoma state line. On October 28, 1953, the road was extended west 4.6 miles (7.4 km) to a road intersection.

== FM 339 ==
Farm to Market Road 339
- Location: Hill and Limestone Counties
- Length: 48.328 mi (77.776 km)
- Existed: June 23, 1945–present

Farm to Market Road 339 (FM 339) is located in Hill and Limestone Counties. It runs from FM 2114 to SH 14 in Kosse.

FM 339 was designated on June 23, 1945, running from Kirk southward across SH 164 to 2.0 miles (3.2 km) south of Ben Hur. On January 23, 1953, the road was extended southwest to FM 147. On October 18, 1954, the road was extended southeast to SH 14, replacing FM 1663. On November 24, 1959, the road was extended northwest to US 84, with the old section from Kirk eastward becoming a spur connection. That spur connection was cancelled on January 25, 1962. On July 15, 1971, the road was extended northwest to FM 2114, replacing FM 737. Part of what was designated as FM 737 was previously designated as FM 1662. On September 29, 2016, FM 339 was rerouted on a new route to FM 3258 and Business SH 31-K; the section of FM 339 that terminated near SH 31 became FM Spur 339.

== FM 340 ==
Farm to Market Road 340
- Location: Lavaca County
- Length: 14.535 mi (23.392 km)
- Existed: May 23, 1951–present

Farm to Market Road 340 (FM 340) is located in Lavaca County. It runs from SH 95 south of Moulton east and southeast to US 77 Alt.

FM 340 was designated on May 23, 1951, to run from SH 95 east to Oak Grove School. On December 17, 1952, the road was extended east to Witting. On November 13, 1953, the road was extended southeast to US 77 Alt., replacing FM 1298.

=== FM 340 (1945) ===
Farm to Market Road 340
- Location: Limestone County
- Length: 6.0 mi (9.7 km)
- Existed: June 23, 1945–December 17, 1947

A previous route numbered FM 340 was designated on June 23, 1945, from SH 14, 3 miles (4.8 km) south of Groesbeck to 2.5 miles (4.0 km) south of Big Hill in Limestone County. FM 340 was cancelled on December 17, 1947, and became a portion of FM 147.

== FM 341 ==
Farm to Market Road 341
- Location: Limestone County
- Length: 3.075 mi (4.949 km)
- Existed: June 23, 1945–present

Farm to Market Road 341 (FM 341) is located in Limestone County. It runs from FM 73 to Delia.

FM 341 was designated on June 23, 1945, along the current route.

== FM 342 ==
Farm to Market Road 342
- Location: McLennan and Limestone counties
- Length: 5.576 mi (8.974 km)
- Existed: June 23, 1945–present

Farm to Market Road 342 (FM 342) is located in McLennan and Limestone counties. It runs from FM 939 north of Mart to FM 339.

FM 342 was designated on June 23, 1945, from Victoria in Limestone County to the McLennan County line. On July 9, 1945, the road was extended to SH 164 in Mart. On November 24, 1959, the road was to be rerouted to end at FM 339 (which was extended north that day) when construction on that section was complete. On June 15, 1961, construction was completed, and the old route northeast to Victoria was given to the county (it is now CR 318). On November 18, 1975, the section from FM 939 to SH 164 was given to the city and county; what was planned to become the new location of FM 342 became part of FM 939 when that road was extended south.

== FM 343 ==
Farm to Market Road 343
- Location: Cherokee and Nacogdoches counties
- Length: 37.437 mi (60.249 km)
- Existed: June 11, 1945–present

Farm to Market Road 343 (FM 343) is located in Cherokee and Nacogdoches counties. It runs from FM 2972 north of Rusk to BU 59-F north of Redfield.

FM 343 was designated on June 11, 1945, to run from US 69 in Rusk southeast for 8 miles (13 km). On September 9, 1947, the road was extended southeast 2.2 miles (3.5 km). On January 23, 1953 (connecting section designated December 17), the road was extended east to FM 225, replacing FM 940. On April 24, 1959, the road was extended east to FM 1638, replacing FM 2424. On November 24, 1959, the road was extended west to FM 752. On July 31, 1964, the road was extended east to US 59 (later Loop 495, now BU 59-F). On January 31, 1973, the road was extended west and north to US 69, but it was constructed to end at FM 2972 instead.

Junction list

County	Location	mi	km	Destinations	Notes
Cherokee	Rusk	0.0	0.0	FM 2972	Access to UT Health East Texas Rusk
Cherokee	Rusk	1.2	1.9	US 84 – Rusk, Palestine	
Cherokee	Rusk	2.3	3.7	FM 23 to SH 294 – Business District	
Cherokee	Rusk	3.1	5.0	FM 752 – Hudson Chapel	
Cherokee	Rusk	4.3	6.9	US 69 – Business District, Alto	
Cherokee		12.4	20.0	FM 851 south – Alto	
Nacogdoches		22.3	35.9	FM 225 south – Douglass	West end of FM 225 overlap
Nacogdoches		23.5	37.8	FM 225 north – Cushing	East end of FM 225 overlap
Nacogdoches		36.0	57.9	FM 1638	
Nacogdoches		37.8	60.8	US 59	Interchange
Nacogdoches	Nacogdoches	38.6	62.1	Bus. US 59	
1.000 mi = 1.609 km; 1.000 km = 0.621 mi: Concurrency terminus

== FM 344 ==
Farm to Market Road 344
- Location: Smith County
- Length: 18.126 mi (29.171 km)
- Existed: June 11, 1945–present

Farm to Market Road 344 (FM 344) is located in Smith County.

The western terminus of FM 344 is at SH 155 in unincorporated Smith County, southwest of Noonday; the roadway continues to the west as FM 2661. The route travels to the south and then east, through Teaselville and close to the Cherokee County line into Bullard, where it intersects US 69. FM 344 continues to the northeast, to the community of Walnut Grove, before turning to the east and ending at SH 110 northwest of Troup.

FM 344 was designated on June 11, 1945, between Eureka (now part of Teaselville) and Bullard. The route was extended to its eastern terminus at SH 110 on February 17, 1947, and to its western terminus at SH 155 on December 17, 1952. A realignment of the western terminus on February 15, 1971, established the current routing.

Junction list

The entire route is in Smith County.

Location	mi	km	Destinations	Notes
	0.0	0.0	SH 155 – Frankston, Noonday	Western terminus; continues as FM 2661
Teaselville	4.4	7.1	FM 346 – Flint	
	8.4	13.5	FM 2137	
Bullard	9.8	15.8	FM 2493 – Flint	
Bullard	10.3	16.6	US 69 – Tyler, Jacksonville	
	14.5	23.3	FM 756	
	18.1	29.1	SH 110 – Troup, Whitehouse	Eastern terminus
1.000 mi = 1.609 km; 1.000 km = 0.621 mi

== FM 345 ==
Farm to Market Road 345
- Location: Smith County
- Length: 1.939 mi (3.121 km)
- Existed: June 11, 1945–present

Farm to Market Road 345 (FM 345) is located in Smith County. It runs from SH 135 near Arp to Omen.

FM 345 was designated on June 11, 1945, along the current route. The road was extended southwest to FM 346 on February 26, 1986, but this extension was cancelled on March 28, 2013, as the county failed to secure right of way.

== FM 346 ==
Farm to Market Road 346
- Location: Cherokee and Smith counties
- Length: 28.760 mi (46.285 km)
- Existed: June 11, 1945–present

Farm to Market Road 346 (FM 346) is a 29-mile (47 km) route in Cherokee and Smith counties. It runs from FM 855 in unincorporated Cherokee County at its western terminus to SH 110 in Troup at its eastern terminus. FM 346 was established from Whitehouse west 2.5 miles (4.0 km) and from Whitehouse east 2.5 miles (4.0 km) on June 11, 1945. On October 29, 1948, it was extended west to U.S. Highway 69. On November 20, 1951, it was extended west to FM 344. On December 17, 1952, it was extended east to SH 110. It reached its current route on June 28, 1963, when it was extended southwest to FM 855.

== FM 347 ==
Farm to Market Road 347
- Location: Cherokee County
- Length: 14.643 mi (23.566 km)
- Existed: June 11, 1945–present

Farm to Market Road 347 (FM 347) is located in Cherokee County. It runs from US 69 in Jacksonville to US 84 in Oakland.

FM 347 was designated on June 11, 1945, from Troup to Jacksonville. The same day the road was extended south via Dialville to US 84. On February 20, 1946, the section from Jacksonville to US 84 was cancelled and redesignated as a state highway, although it was signed as an FM route. On June 9, 1947, a section along N. Bolton Street from Cherokee Street to E. Larrissa Street in Jacksonville was added. On May 21, 1953, the section designated as a state highway was changed back to an FM route. On October 27, 1953, the section from Troup to US 69 in Jacksonville was signed (but not designated) as SH 135. On November 5, 1971, the road was extended north 0.3 miles (0.48 km) from US 79 to US 175. On August 29, 1990, the section from SH 110 in Troup to US 69 in Jacksonville was cancelled when the SH 135 designation became official. On December 18, 2003, by district request, the road was extended 3.4 miles (5.5 km) to US 69 in Jacksonville, replacing a section of old US 175 and all of Spur 386.

== FM 348 ==
Farm to Market Road 348
- Location: Rusk and Panola counties
- Length: 8.608 mi (13.853 km)
- Existed: June 11, 1945–present

Farm to Market Road 348 (FM 348) is located in Rusk and Panola counties. It runs from US 79 southeast to SH 315 southeast of Long Branch.

FM 348 was designated on January 11, 1945, to run from SH 315 north and west via Long Branch to Pinehill. When this was agreed to become a Farm to Market Road on June 11, 1945, the road was extended northeast to US 79. On January 27, 1953, the section from FM 1798 in Pine Hill to US 79 was transferred to FM 1798, and the road was rerouted northwest over FM 1715 (which was cancelled) to US 79.

== FM 349 ==
Farm to Market Road 349
- Location: Gregg County
- Length: 9.953 mi (16.018 km)
- Existed: June 6, 1945–present

Farm to Market Road 349 (FM 349) is located in Gregg County. It runs from Bus. US 259/SH 31 in Kilgore east to SH 149 near Lakeport.

FM 349 was designated on June 6, 1945, from Kilgore to the Gregg County Airport. It was extended east to SH 149 on October 29, 1948.

Junction list

The entire route is in Gregg County.

Location	mi	km	Destinations	Notes
Kilgore			Bus. US 259 / SH 31 – Tyler, Longview	
Kilgore			US 259 (Charles K Devall Memorial Hwy) – Longview, Henderson	Interchange
Kilgore			FM 2087 north (Old Kilgore Hwy)	
			FM 2276	
			FM 2011	
Lakeport			SH 322 (Gardiner Mitchell Pkwy) – Longview, Henderson	
			FM 2963 east	
			SH 149 (Estes Pkwy) – Longview, Tatum	
1.000 mi = 1.609 km; 1.000 km = 0.621 mi

== FM 350 ==
Farm to Market Road 350
- Location: Polk County
- Length: 27.706 mi (44.588 km)
- Existed: June 11, 1945–present

Farm to Market Road 350 (FM 350) is a 27.7-mile-long (44.6 km) route in Polk County. It runs from FM 3126 in unincorporated Polk County at its western terminus (near the eastern shore of Lake Livingston) to US 59 (future I-69) in Moscow at its eastern terminus. FM 350 was established on June 11, 1945, from US 190 southwest 5.0 miles (8.0 km). On October 29, 1953, it was extended north 11.0 miles (17.7 km). On October 13, 1954, it was extended north to FM 1643 near Colita. On February 21, 1958, it was extended east to US 59, replacing FM 1643. On June 2, 1967, it was extended southwestward to FM 1988. On October 23, 1967, the section from FM 3126 to FM 1988 was transferred to FM 3126.

FM 350 passes by both the Livingston Municipal Airport and the Texas Department of Criminal Justice Polunsky Unit (the latter being the home of the state's death row for men).

== FM 351 ==
Farm to Market Road 351
- Location: Bee County
- Length: 7.146 mi (11.500 km)
- Existed: October 31, 1957–present

Farm to Market Road 351 (FM 351) is located in Bee County. It runs from SH 202 west, north and east to US 181, forming a partial loop around Beeville.

FM 351 was designated on October 31, 1957, from US 181 (now US 181 Business) near the south city limit of Beeville, east to SH 202. On August 2, 1968, the road was extended west, north and east to US 181 north of Beeville, replacing FM 299. On November 26, 1969, the road was extended 1.1 miles (1.8 km) east to a relief route. On February 26, 1986, a 2.0-mile (3.2 km) section from US 181 northeast to US 59 was added, but this section was cancelled on December 21, 1987.

Junction list

The entire route is in Bee County.

Location	mi	km	Destinations	Notes
Beeville	0.0	0.0	SH 202	
Beeville	0.6	0.97	Bus. US 181	
	0.8	1.3	FM 888	
Beeville	2.6	4.2	US 59 – George West	
	4.4	7.1	FM 673	
Beeville	6.0	9.7	Bus. US 181 (St. Mary's Street)	
Beeville	7.1	11.4	US 181 – San Antonio, Corpus Christi	Interchange
1.000 mi = 1.609 km; 1.000 km = 0.621 mi

=== FM 351 (1945) ===
Farm to Market Road 351
- Location: Polk County
- Existed: June 11, 1945–December 13, 1956

A previous route numbered FM 351 was designated on June 11, 1945, from US 190 near the Trinity River via Kickapoo to Onalaska. On November 21, 1956, the road was extended to the Trinity County line. FM 351 was cancelled on December 13, 1956, and transferred to FM 356.

== FM 352 ==
Farm to Market Road 352
- Location: Polk County
- Length: 7.996 mi (12.868 km)
- Existed: June 11, 1945–present

Farm to Market Road 352 (FM 352) is located in Polk County. It runs from US 59 in Corrigan east and south to US 287.

FM 352 was designated on June 11, 1945, to run from US 59 east to Pluck. On October 13, 1954, the road was extended south to US 287, completing its current route.

== FM 353 ==
Farm to Market Road 353
- Location: San Augustine and Shelby Counties
- Length: 9.768 mi (15.720 km)
- Existed: June 11, 1945–present

Farm to Market Road 353 (FM 353) is located in San Augustine and Shelby Counties. It runs from US 96 in San Augustine northeast 9.8 miles (15.8 km) to SH 87.

FM 353 was designated on June 11, 1945, to run from US 96 east to the Shelby County line. On September 9, 1947 (date of agreement September 18), the road was extended east to SH 87.

== FM 354 ==
Farm to Market Road 354
- Location: San Augustine County
- Length: 6.022 mi (9.691 km)
- Existed: June 11, 1945–present

Farm to Market Road 354 (FM 354) is located in San Augustine County. It runs from SH 21 northward 6.2 miles (10.0 km)

FM 354 was designated on June 11, 1945, to run from SH 21 in Denning northward 4.7 miles (7.6 km) to Howell's Store. On February 26, 1986, the road was extended north 1.5 miles (2.4 km) to its current end.

== FM 355 ==
Farm to Market Road 355
- Location: Trinity County
- Length: 14.003 mi (22.536 km)
- Existed: June 14, 1945–present

Farm to Market Road 355 (FM 354) is located in Trinity County. It runs from US 287 in Groveton to FM 356 in Sebastopol.

FM 355 was designated on June 11, 1945, to run from US 287 in Groveton southward 5.7 miles (9.2 km). On November 23, 1948, the road was extended southwest 5.6 miles (9.0 km) to Chita. On May 30, 1950, the road was extended to FM 356 in Sebastopol.

== FM 356 ==
Farm to Market Road 356
- Location: Trinity and Polk counties
- Length: 20.144 mi (32.419 km)
- Existed: June 14, 1945–present

Farm to Market Road 356 (FM 356) is located in Trinity and Polk counties. It runs from SH 94 at Trinity southeast and south to US 190 near Onalaska.

FM 356 was designated on June 14, 1945, from Trinity southeast 5 miles (8.0 km). On November 23, 1948, the road was extended southeast to Sebastopol. On December 17, 1952, the road was extended southeast 3.6 miles (5.8 km) to a road intersection. On November 21, 1956, the road was extended to the Polk County line. On December 13, 1956, the road was extended to US 190 near the Trinity River, replacing FM 351. On March 31, 1970, a section of FM 356 from US 190 south 2.2 miles (3.5 km) miles was transferred to FM 3186 and two underwater sections totaling 4.7 miles (7.6 km) were cancelled. On April 24, 2003, a segment of surplus right of way eroded by Lake Livingston (TxDOT no longer needed the segment) and a .064 miles (0.103 km) mile section of FM 356 near the north shore of Lake Livingston were removed from the state highway system.

== FM 357 ==
Farm to Market Road 357
- Location: Houston, Trinity, and Polk counties
- Length: 34.074 mi (54.837 km)
- Existed: June 14, 1945–present

Farm to Market Road 357 (FM 357) is located in Houston, Trinity, and Polk counties. It runs from SH 7 in Kennard southeast to US 59 north of Corrigan. It has a spur connection west to Nogalus.

FM 357 was designated on June 14, 1945, to run from SH 94 in Apple Springs northwest to Centralia. On May 23, 1951, the road was extended west to Nogalus. On December 3, 1953, the road was extended south 4.9 miles (7.9 km) from SH 94, creating a concurrency with SH 94. On August 24, 1955, the road was extended south 3.0 miles (4.8 km) to a road intersection (this road would become part of FM 2262 on September 27, 1960) near Trevat. On May 23, 1966, the road was rerouted to extend north to SH 7 in Kennard, replacing FM 233 (which was reassigned to a new continuation of this road to the south), while the old route to Nogalus became a spur connection. At the same time, the road was extended east replacing part of FM 2262 to FM 2714, and replaced all of FM 2714 to US 59.

== FM 358 ==
Farm to Market Road 358
- Location: Houston and Trinity counties
- Length: 13.131 mi (21.132 km)
- Existed: June 14, 1945–present

Farm to Market Road 358 (FM 358) is located in Houston and Trinity counties. It runs from US 287 in Pennington to SH 94.

FM 358 was designated on June 14, 1945, to run from US 287 in Pennington east to Crete. On January 23, 1953 (connecting section designated December 17, 1952), the road was extended east to SH 94, replacing FM 948. On October 17, 1962, the road was extended west over the old location of US 287 to US 287.

== FM 359 ==
Farm to Market Road 359
- Location: Fort Bend and Waller counties
- Length: 46.201 mi (74.353 km)
- Existed: June 18, 1945–present

Farm to Market Road 359 (FM 359) is located in Fort Bend and Waller counties. It runs from US 90 Alt. east of Richmond to US 290/SH 6 east of Hempstead.

FM 359 was designated on June 18, 1945, from US 59, 1 mile (1.6 km) east of Richmond, northwest to the Waller County line and from Richmond south to Thompsons. The same day the road was extended northwest through Brookshire to SH 6 southeast of Hempstead. This replaced part of SH 6. On September 26, 1945, the road was extended to US 290 at or near Hempstead. On August 1, 1947, the Thompsons-Richmond section was cancelled (it is now FM 762 and FM 2759). On December 15, 1982, the road was extended to the new location of US 290.

== FM 360 ==
Farm to Market Road 360
- Location: Fort Bend County
- Length: 8.808 mi (14.175 km)
- Existed: June 18, 1945–present

Farm to Market Road 360 (FM 360) is located in Fort Bend County. It runs from SH 36 in Needville to US 59/Loop 540 near Beasley.

FM 360 is a two-lane highway for its entire length. It begins at a traffic signal on SH 36 in Needville and proceeds along Main Street. After going 0.4 miles (0.6 km) to the northwest, FM 360 comes to a traffic signal at FM 1236 (School Street). After entering the countryside, FM 360 continues straight to the northeast until it approaches the US 59 overpass southwest of Beasley. Near its terminus, the highway bends to the north and passes under US 59 (future I-69) before ending at Loop 540.

FM 360 was originally designated on June 18, 1945, from SH 36 in Needville and running 8 miles (12.9 km) to the northeast to US 59. On March 29, 1953, a 0.56-mile-long (0.90 km) spur connection between FM 360 and SH 36 along School Street was added. On October 31, 1958, the spur connection was transferred to FM 1236.

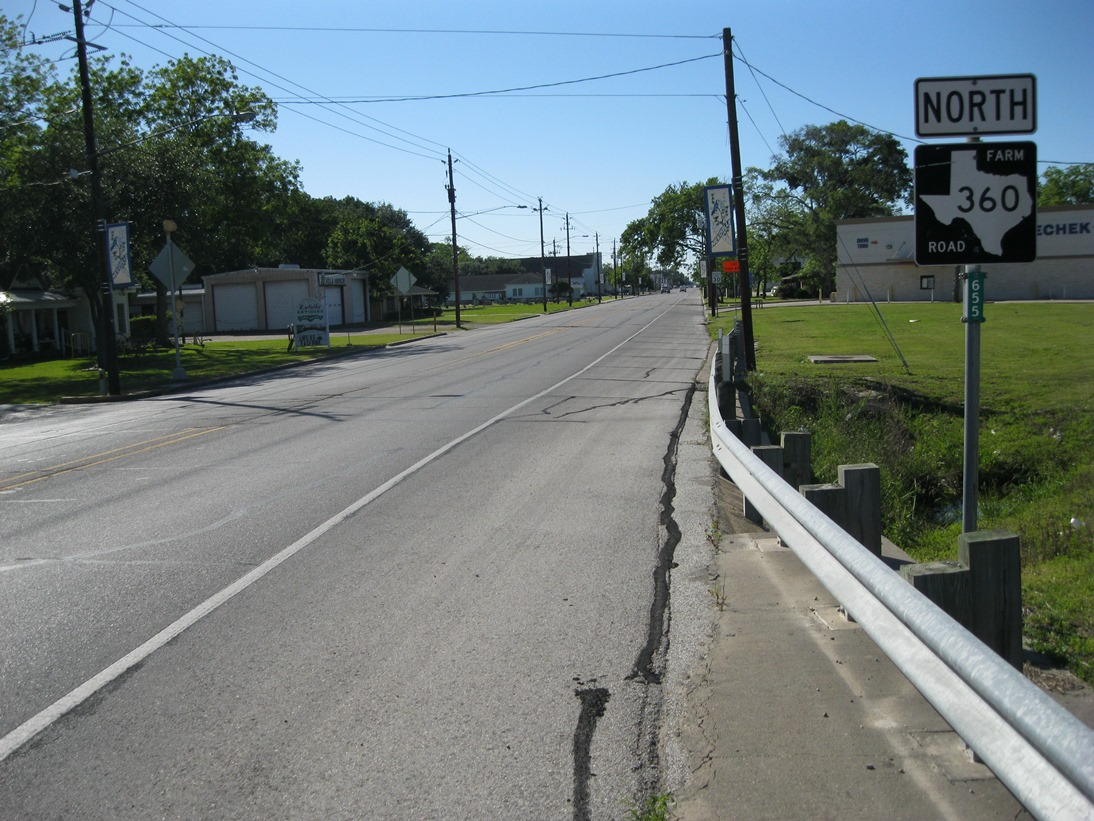
Northeast on FM 360 just north of Highway 36 in Needville

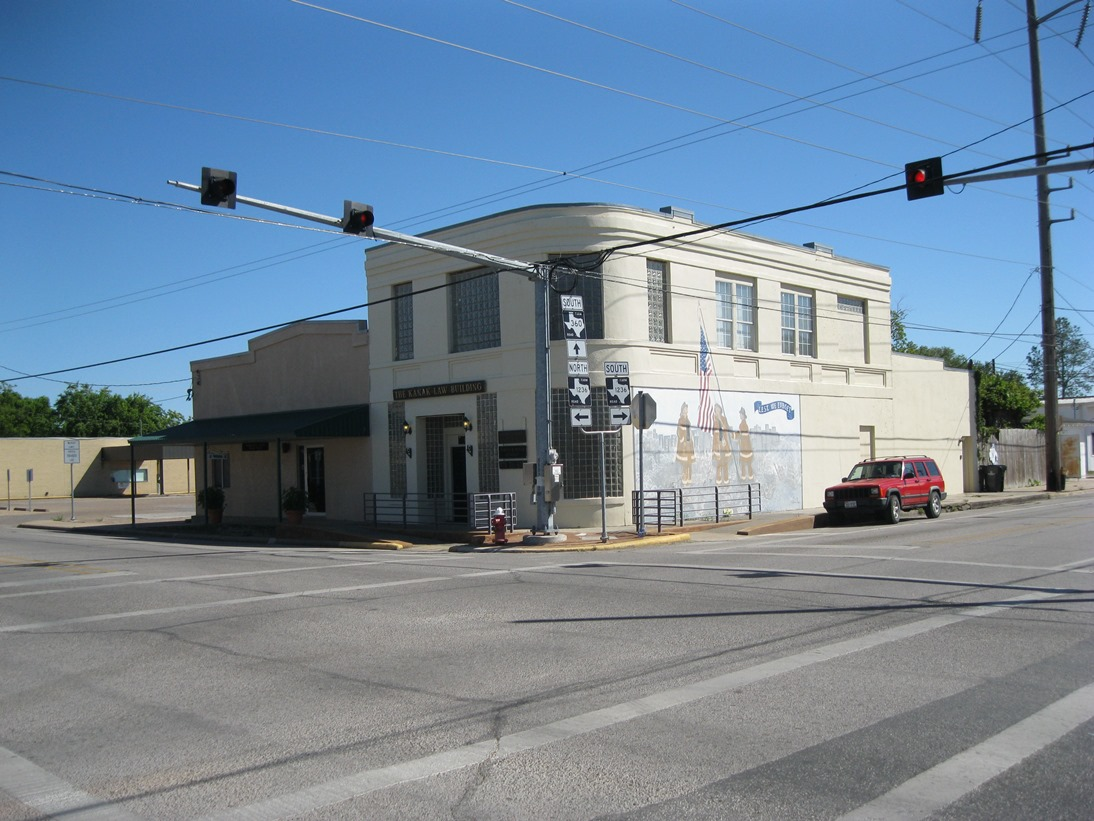
Kanak Law Building at FM 360 and FM 1236 in Needville

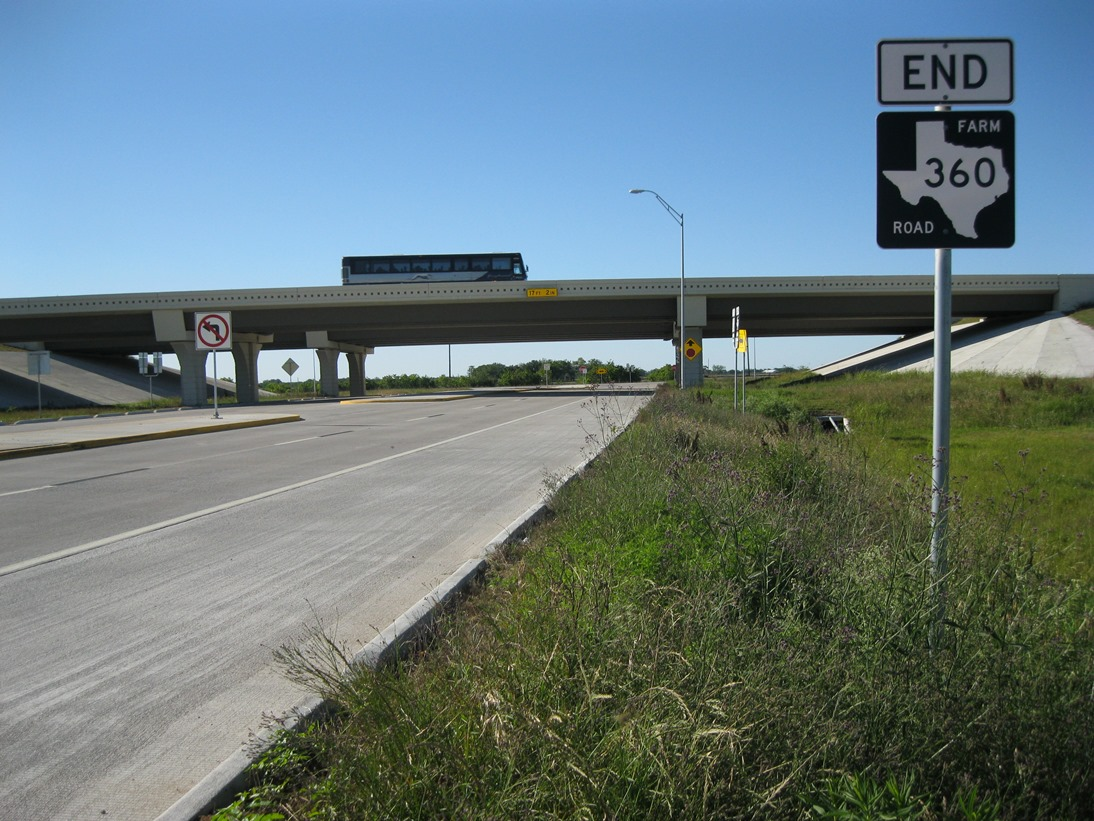
The Future I-69/US 59 overpass at the end of FM 360 near Beasley

Junction list

The entire highway is in Fort Bend County.

Location	mi	km	Destinations	Notes
Needville	0.0	0.0	SH 36 – Damon, Rosenberg	Southern terminus
Needville	0.4	0.64	FM 1236 – Boling	Northern terminus of FM 1236
Beasley	8.8	14.2	Future I-69 / US 59 / Loop 540 – Wharton, Houston	I-69/US 59 exit 89; northern terminus
1.000 mi = 1.609 km; 1.000 km = 0.621 mi

== FM 361 ==
Farm to Market Road 361
- Location: Fort Bend County
- Length: 7.192 mi (11.574 km)
- Existed: June 18, 1945–present

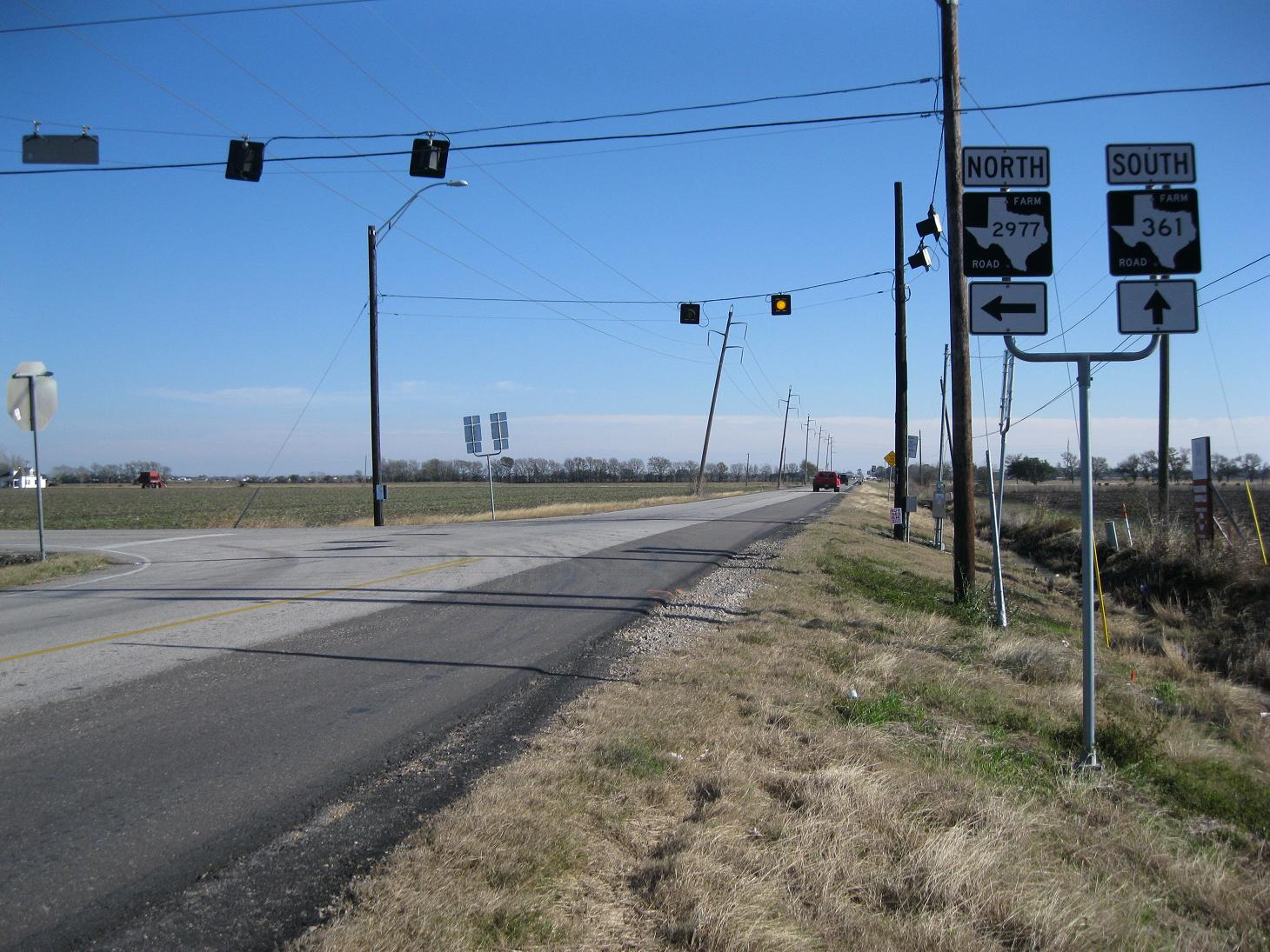
FM 361 at FM 2977

Farm to Market Road 361 (FM 361) is located in Fort Bend County. Its southern terminus is at FM 1994 at Long Point. FM 361 runs northwest for 7.2 miles (11.6 km) via Fairchilds, intersecting FM 2977, before ending at SH 36, 2 miles (3.2 km) south-southwest of Pleak.

FM 361 was designated on June 18, 1945, from SH 36 south of Rosenberg to Fairchilds. On March 18, 1947, it was extended to Long Point.

== FM 362 ==
Farm to Market Road 362
- Location: Grimes and Waller counties
- Length: 41.162 mi (66.244 km)
- Existed: June 18, 1945–present

Farm to Market Road 362 (FM 362) is located in Grimes and Waller counties. It runs from SH 105 east of Navasota south to FM 1488 at Fields Store and from FM 1488 near the Harris County line south via Waller to FM 359 in Brookshire.

FM 362 was designated on June 18, 1945, from US 290 at Prairie View northeast to Joseph. On October 8, 1945, the description was changed so that FM 362 ran from US 290 near Waller 10.0 miles (16.1 km) miles south toward Brookshire. The road was extended south 4.0 miles (6.4 km) on December 16, 1948, and north to FM 1098 on September 15, 1949, replacing FM 1473. On May 23, 1951, the road was extended south to FM 359 in Brookshire, and north to the Grimes County line on December 17, 1952, creating a concurrency with FM 1488 and replacing a portion of FM 1098. On June 15, 1954, the road was extended north to SH 6 near Navasota, replacing FM 245 (the connecting section was designated on March 24). On July 12, 1967, FM 362 was rerouted, replacing old FM 2988; the old route of FM 362 was renumbered FM 2988.

== FM 363 ==
Farm to Market Road 363
- Location: Newton County
- Length: 15.262 mi (24.562 km)
- Existed: June 13, 1945–present

Farm to Market Road 363 (FM 363) is located in Newton County. It begins at an intersection with US 96 in north Kirbyville, just inside the city limits. The road travels east, roughly paralleling the Timber Rock Railroad to its south, and intersects SH 87 in Bleakwood. It intersects FM 2626 before reaching its eastern terminus at US 190 near the community of Bon Wier.

FM 363 was designated on June 13, 1945, from Bleakwood eastward to the junction with US 190. The western portion of the route, from US 96 to SH 87, was originally designated as SH 340 in 1941; that designation was cancelled and combined with FM 363 on September 26, 1945.

== FM 364 ==
Farm to Market Road 364
- Location: Jefferson County
- Length: 11.695 mi (18.821 km)
- Existed: June 18, 1945–present

Farm to Market Road 364 (FM 364) is located in Jefferson County. Its southern terminus is at SH 124 on the southwestern side of Beaumont. Heading north along Major Drive, it first crosses I-10 and then US 90. Continuing north, it intersects SH 105 before reaching its northern terminus at Tram Road, which provides access to US 69/US 96/US 287.

FM 364 was designated on June 18, 1945, from SH 105 to SH 124. On August 24, 1955, FM 364 was extended 3.5 miles (5.6 km) from SH 124, but this extension was cancelled on July 16, 1957. On October 15, 1976, the section of FM 364 from SH 105 southwest to FM 3120 was cancelled, and FM 364 was rerouted on its current route north to SH 105, replacing a portion of FM 3120. On June 9, 1983, FM 364 was extended north to Tram Road, replacing the remainder of FM 3120. On June 27, 1995, the entire route was transferred to Urban Road 364 (UR 364). The designation reverted to FM 364 with the elimination of the Urban Road system on November 15, 2018.

== FM 365 ==
Farm to Market Road 365
- Location: Jefferson County
- Length: 35.800 mi (57.615 km)
- Existed: June 18, 1945–present

Farm to Market Road 365 (FM 365) is located in Jefferson County. It runs from US 90 in Nome south, east, and northeast to Port Neches Ave and Nall Street in Port Neches.

FM 365 was designated on June 18, 1945, to run from SH 124 in Fannett eastward 9.3 miles (15.0 km) to the Spindletop Road. On January 27, 1948, the road was extended west and north to US 90 in Nome and east and northeast to FM 366 in Port Neches. On September 29, 1948, the east end was changed to be at Port Neches Ave and Nall Street in Port Neches. On June 27, 1995, the section east of Spur 93 became Urban Road 365 (UR 365), but this section reverted to being part of FM 365 with the elimination of the Urban Road System on November 15, 2018.

== FM 366 ==
Farm to Market Road 366
- Location: Jefferson County
- Length: 8.042 mi (12.942 km)
- Existed: June 18, 1945–present

Farm to Market Road 366 (FM 366) is located in Jefferson County. It runs from SH 347 near Nederland southeast through Port Neches and Groves to SH 87 in Port Arthur.

FM 366 was designated on June 18, 1945, along the current route. On June 27, 1995, the entire route was redesignated as Urban Road 366 (UR 366). The designation reverted to FM 366 with the elimination of the Urban Road system on November 15, 2018.

== FM 367 ==
Farm to Market Road 367
- Location: Wichita County
- Length: 19.012 mi (30.597 km)
- Existed: June 25, 1945–present

Farm to Market Road 367 (FM 367) is located in Wichita County. It runs from SH 25 at Rocky Point to Loop 11 in Wichita Falls.

FM 367 was designated on June 25, 1945, from Loop 11 in Wichita Falls west 8.8 miles (14.2 km), and from SH 25 in Rocky Point east 4.0 miles (6.4 km), creating a gap in the route. On July 14, 1949, the gap was closed.

== FM 368 ==
Farm to Market Road 368
- Location: Wichita and Archer counties
- Length: 46.283 mi (74.485 km)
- Existed: June 25, 1945–present

Farm to Market Road 368 (FM 368) is located in Wichita and Archer counties. It runs from SH 240 south, west, and north to US 287.

FM 368 was designated on June 25, 1945, to run from US 82 in Holliday north to the Iowa Park Kamay Road (now FM 1206). On November 23, 1946, the road was extended south to Dads Corner. On July 14, 1949, the road was extended north to FM 367. On January 23, 1953, the road was extended southwest to SH 25. On February 6, 1953, the road was extended north to SH 240, replacing FM 1205 and creating a concurrency with FM 367, and southwest to Lake Kickapoo Dam, replacing FM 1955. On February 2, 1959 (connecting section designated October 31, 1958), the road was extended northwest and north to US 287, replacing FM 921. On January 19, 1979, the road was relocated to be concurrent with BU 287-J in Iowa Park.

== FM 369 ==
Farm to Market Road 369
- Location: Wichita County
- Length: 22.698 mi (36.529 km)
- Existed: June 25, 1945–present

Farm to Market Road 369 (FM 369) is located in Wichita County. It runs from SH 79 in Wichita Falls westward and northward to SH 240 in Burkburnett. It is known as Southwest Parkway in Wichita Falls.

FM 369 was designated on June 25, 1945, from SH 240 west of Burkburnett to US 287 (now Bus. US 287). On December 17, 1952, the road was extended south and east 11.0 miles (17.7 km) to a county road. On October 29, 1953, the road was extended east 1.3 miles (2.1 km) to SH 79. On June 27, 1995, the section from US 82/US 277 to SH 79 was internally redesignated as Urban Road 369 (UR 369). This section reverted to FM 369 with the elimination of the Urban Road system on November 15, 2018.

== FM 370 ==
Farm to Market Road 370
- Location: Wichita and Wilbarger counties
- Length: 10.854 mi (17.468 km)
- Existed: June 25, 1945–present

Farm to Market Road 370 (FM 370) is located in Wichita and Wilbarger counties. It runs from SH 25 west via Elliot to US 183/US 70.

FM 370 was designated on June 25, 1945, to run from SH 25 west to the Wilbarger County line. On July 9 of that year, the road was extended west to US 183.

== FM 371 ==
Farm to Market Road 371
- Location: Cooke County
- Length: 9.773 mi (15.728 km)
- Existed: June 23, 1945–present

Farm to Market Road 371 (FM 371) is located in Cooke County. It runs from US 82 east of Gainesville northward 9.8 miles (15.8 km).

FM 371 was designated on June 23, 1945, along the current route.

== FM 372 ==
Farm to Market Road 372
- Location: Cooke County
- Length: 19.601 mi (31.545 km)
- Existed: June 23, 1945–present

Farm to Market Road 372 (FM 372) is located in Cooke County.

FM 372 was designated on June 23, 1945, from US 77 Gainesville southeast 8.8 miles (14.2 km) toward Mountain Springs. On December 17, 1951, FM 372 was extended north 2.8 miles (4.5 km) miles incorporating old US 77. On October 28, 1953, FM 372 was extended southeast 7.7 miles (12.4 km) miles to a road intersection. On September 29, 1954, FM 372 was extended southeast 6.8 miles (10.9 km) to FM 455. On November 23, 1959, US 82 was rerouted so that it was no longer concurrent with FM 372. On October 21, 1981, 3.3 miles (5.3 km) miles were deleted after the construction of Lake Ray Roberts.

In its current configuration the road begins at an intersection with Interstate 35, continuing generally southeast into Gainesville before exiting the city to the southeast. After passing through the rural communities of Burns City and Mountain Springs, the road continues southward until its intersection with Farm to Market Road 3002. At that intersection the road physically continues as FM3002 in a southwestern direction while FM 372 continues southward until reaching the community of Broomfield where it ends and becomes a local road.

== FM 373 ==
Farm to Market Road 373
- Location: Cooke and Montague counties
- Length: 29.839 mi (48.021 km)
- Existed: June 23, 1945–present

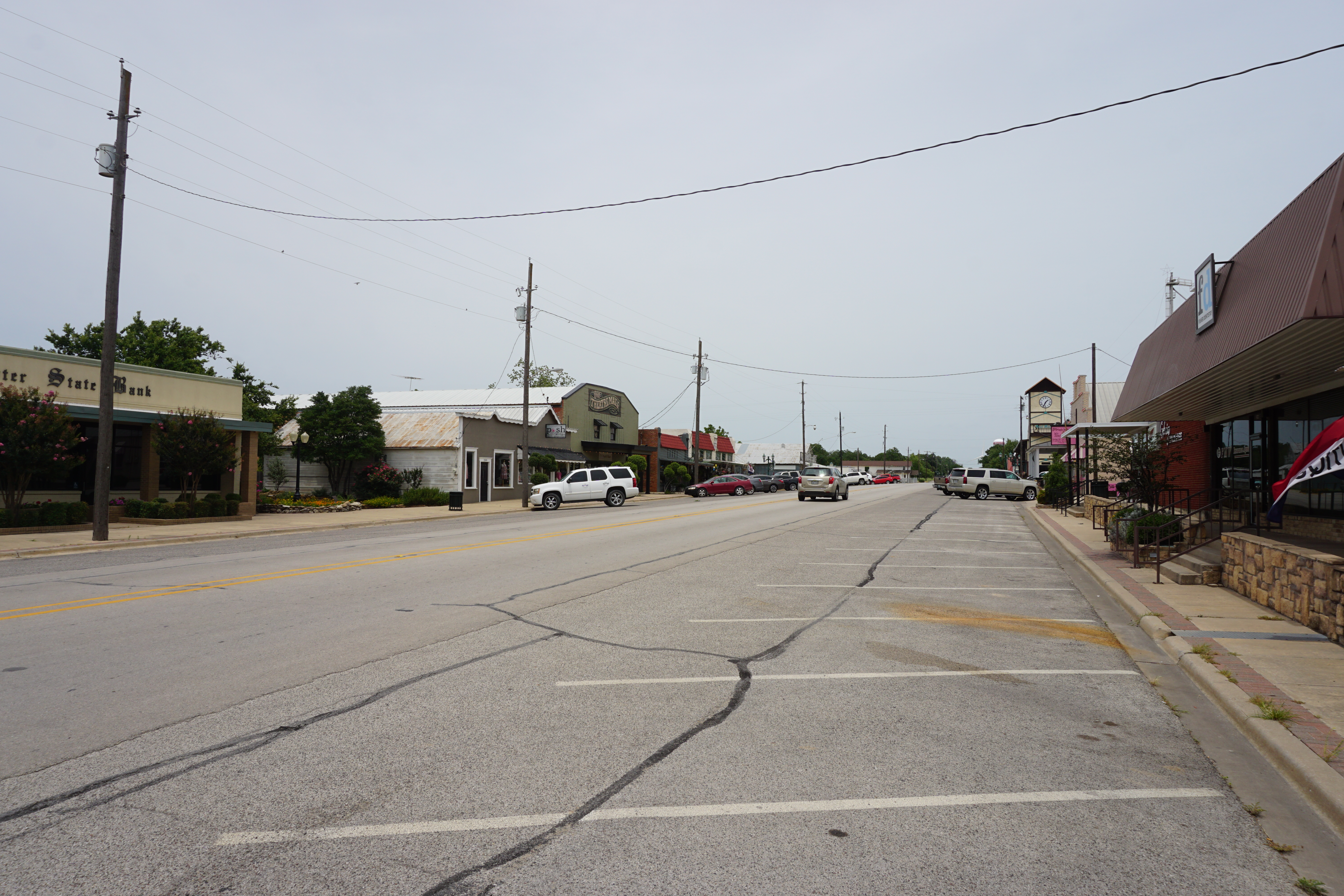
FM 373 as Main Street in Muenster

Farm to Market Road 373 (FM 373) is located in Cooke and Montague counties.

FM 373 runs from FM 922, near Rosston, to FM 677. FM 373 also runs through Muenster and Bulcher.

FM 373 was originally designated on June 23, 1945, from US 82 in Muenster north 5 miles (8.0 km). On November 23, 1948, it was extended 5.4 miles (8.7 km) south to what was later FM 1630 at Linn School. On September 29, 1954, it was extended north 5.4 miles (8.7 km) to a road intersection. On February 15, 1959, FM 373 was extended 4.6 miles (7.4 km) to FM 2382. On May 7, 1974, FM 373 was extended south 2.5 miles (4.0 km) from FM 1630. On November 25, 1975, it was extended south 2.7 miles (4.3 km) to FM 922. On December 20, 1988, FM 373 was extended north to FM 677.

== FM 374 ==
Farm to Market Road 374
- Location: Callahan and Eastland counties
- Length: 5.131 mi (8.258 km)
- Existed: September 27, 1954–present

Farm to Market Road 374 (FM 374) is located in Eastland and Callahan counties. It runs from SH 206 in Cross Plains to FM 569 in Pioneer.

FM 374 was designated on September 27, 1954, from FM 880 in Cross Plains east and south to SH 36 over a former routing of SH 36. On February 6, 1973, the western terminus was redesignated as SH 206 and the route was extended east to FM 569.

=== FM 374 (1945) ===
Farm to Market Road 374
- Location: Archer County
- Length: 22.5 mi (36.2 km)
- Existed: June 25, 1945–December 10, 1953

A previous route numbered FM 374 was designated on June 25, 1945, from SH 199 in Megargel to a point 6.6 miles (10.6 km) northeast in Archer County. On May 23, 1951, FM 374 was extended northeast 8.5 miles (13.7 km) to FM 1196 west of Archer City. On October 9, 1951, the highway was extended east to SH 25, replacing FM 1196. The highway was extended 2.6 miles (4.2 km) south of Megargel on January 23, 1953. On October 28, 1953, the highway was extended southwest to the Young County line. FM 374 was cancelled on December 10, 1953, and transferred to FM 210.

== FM 375 ==
Farm to Market Road 375
- Location: Maverick County
- Length: 0.915 mi (1,473 m)
- Existed: September 21, 1955–present

Farm to Market Road 375 (FM 375) is located in Maverick County, within the city of Eagle Pass. It runs south–north from FM 1021 to US 57/Bus. US 277.

FM 375 was designated on September 21, 1955, along the current route.

=== FM 375 (1945) ===
Farm to Market Road 375
- Location: Throckmorton County
- Existed: June 19, 1945–February 6, 1953

A previous route numbered FM 375 was designated in Throckmorton County on June 19, 1945, from US 183 in Woodson to US 283. FM 375 was cancelled on February 6, 1953, and transferred to FM 209.

== FM 376 ==
Farm to Market Road 376
- Location: Ochiltree County
- Length: 9.210 mi (14.822 km)
- Existed: June 11, 1945–present

Farm to Market Road 376 (FM 376) is located in Ochiltree County. Its southern terminus is at FM 759. It runs north 9.2 miles (14.8 km), intersecting FM 3045, to SH 15 in Farnsworth.

FM 376 was designated on June 11, 1945, along the current route.

== FM 377 ==
Farm to Market Road 377
- Location: Ochiltree and Lipscomb counties
- Length: 15.292 mi (24.610 km)
- Existed: June 11, 1945–present

Farm to Market Road 377 (FM 377) is located in Ochiltree and Lipscomb counties. It runs west–east from US 83 in Perryton to SH 23 south of Booker.

FM 377 was designated on June 11, 1945, from US 83 in Perryton east 5 miles (8 km). On October 26, 1954, it was extended east to FM 1265 (now SH 23).

== FM 378 ==
Farm to Market Road 378
- Location: Briscoe, Floyd, and Crosby counties
- Length: 71.386 mi (114.885 km)
- Existed: June 16, 1945–present

Farm to Market Road 378 (FM 378) is located in Briscoe, Floyd, and Crosby counties. It runs from SH 86 south to a road intersection south of Robertson.

FM 378 was designated on June 16, 1945, to run from US 62/82 in Lorenzo south to Robertson (current junction with FM 1525). On October 14, 1945, the road was extended north to a cemetery north of Lorenzo. On May 27, 1948, it was routed over Spur 26 (which was cancelled) north of Lorenzo, creating a concurrency with US 62/82. On September 28, 1949, the road was extended north 8.5 miles (13.7 km) to a road intersection north of Lorenzo and south 3.0 miles (4.8 km) from Robertson to a road intersection. A spur connection to the Lorenzo Cemetery was added on January 14, 1952. On September 21, 1955, the road was extended north and east 5.9 miles (9.5 km) to FM 54. On November 24, 1959, the road was extended north to FM 784. On December 21, 1959, the road was extended north replacing a section of FM 784 (the section west to FM 789 became part of FM 579, now FM 37) from there to FM 1310, a section of FM 1310 (which was cancelled as the remainder became part of FM 784) from FM 784 to US 70 in Lockney, and all of FM 598 from Loop 75 to SH 86, creating concurrencies with US 70 and Loop 75; the concurrency with Loop 75 was removed on January 20, 1964, when Loop 75 was truncated.

== FM 379 ==
Farm to Market Road 379
- Location: Grimes County
- Length: 1.532 mi (2.466 km)
- Existed: May 23, 1958–present

Farm to Market Road 379 (FM 379) is a designation that has been used three times. The current use is in Grimes County, from SH 105 in Navasota to BS 6-S.

FM 379 was designated on May 23, 1958, from FM 1227 south of Navasota east to SH 6 (later Loop 508, now BS 6-S). On November 14, 1980, the road was extended over a section of FM 1227.

=== FM 379 (1945–1949) ===
Farm to Market Road 379
- Location: Menard County
- Existed: June 20, 1945–July 21, 1949

The first use of the FM 379 designation was from US 83 north of Menard to the McCulloch County line. FM 379 was cancelled on July 21, 1949, and became a portion of FM 42 (now US 190).

=== FM 379/RM 379 (1951–1957) ===
Farm to Market Road 379
- Location: Sterling, Tom Green, and Irion counties
- Length: 51.9 mi (83.5 km)
- Existed: May 23, 1951–September 27, 1957

The second use of the FM 379 designation was on May 23, 1951, from US 87 in Sterling City south 1.5 miles (2.4 km) in Sterling County. The road was extended southwest 5.0 miles (8.0 km) on December 17, 1952, and another 2.5 miles (4.0 km) miles southwest on October 29, 1953. On October 26, 1954, a farm to market road from the end of FM 379 southward to the end of FM 2008 was designated. On November 23, 1954, the road was extended southwest 43 miles (69 km) into Tom Green and Irion counties to US 67 in Barnhart, replacing FM 2008. FM 379 was cancelled on September 27, 1957, and redesignated SH 163. The designation file for SH 163 calls this RM 379, probably in error.

== FM 380 ==
Farm to Market Road 380
- Location: Tom Green and Concho counties
- Length: 28.380 mi (45.673 km)
- Existed: June 11, 1945 (Note: FM 380 was originally designated as RM 380 from 1945 to 1946.)–present

Farm to Market Road 380 (FM 380) is located in Tom Green and Concho counties. It runs from Loop 306 east to US 83 in Paint Rock.

FM 380 was designated on June 11, 1945, as Ranch to Market Road 380 (RM 380) from San Angelo to Paint Rock. By May 1946, the designation was changed to FM 380. On August 28, 1958, a section from San Angelo east 1.6 miles (2.6 km) was replaced by a rerouted US 67. On March 29, 1988, the road was extended 0.2 miles (0.32 km) north to new US 67. On June 27, 1995, the section from US 67 east to Loop 306 was internally designated as Urban Road 380 (UR 380), but this section was cancelled on November 21, 1996, by district request and transferred to Bus. US 67.

== FM 381 ==
Farm to Market Road 381
- Location: Runnels and Concho counties
- Length: 22.649 mi (36.450 km)
- Existed: June 11, 1945 (Note: FM 381 was originally designated as RM 381 from 1945 to 1946.)–present

Farm to Market Road 381 (FM 381) is located in Runnels and Concho counties. It runs from US 87 north to US 67.

FM 381 was designated on June 11, 1945, as Ranch to Market Road 381 (RM 381) from US 87 to RM 380. By May 1946, the designation was changed to FM 381. On July 14, 1949, the road was extended north to US 67.

== FM 382 ==
Farm to Market Road 382
- Location: Taylor and Runnels counties
- Length: 36.066 mi (58.043 km)
- Existed: June 12, 1945–present

Farm to Market Road 382 (FM 382) is located in Taylor and Runnels counties. It runs from FM 614 at Ovalo to US 67 northeast of Ballinger.

FM 382 was designated on June 12, 1945, to run from US 67 in Ballinger northeast 10.0 miles (16.1 km). On October 29, 1948, the road was extended northeast 6.7 miles (10.8 km) to FM 53 (now SH 153) in Crews. On November 20, 1953, the road was extended north to FM 1770, replacing a section of FM 2010 (which was cancelled as FM 1770 was extended west over the remainder). On October 31, 1957, the road was extended north to FM 604, creating a concurrency with FM 1770. On November 27, 1957, the road was extended north to US 83, replacing FM 688 and creating a concurrency with FM 604. On September 26, 1963, the road was extended south to the new location of US 67. By December 15, 1974, the north end was corrected to FM 614, and the concurrency with FM 1770 was eliminated.

== FM 383 ==
Farm to Market Road 383
- Location: Runnels County
- Length: 16.993 mi (27.348 km)
- Existed: June 12, 1945–present

Farm to Market Road 383 (FM 383) is located in Runnels County. It runs from SH 158 east of Maverick to SH 153 (formerly FM 53) at Wingate.

FM 383 was designated on June 12, 1945, to run from SH 109 (now SH 158) northwest of Ballinger northward to Norton. On November 20, 1951, the road was extended north to FM 384. On October 18, 1954, the road was extended north to Wilmeth, replacing a section of FM 384. On May 6, 1964, the road was extended to FM 53 (now SH 153) at Wingate, completing its current route.

== FM 384 ==
Farm to Market Road 384
- Location: Coke and Runnels counties
- Length: 14.130 mi (22.740 km)
- Existed: June 12, 1945–present

Farm to Market Road 384 (FM 384) is located in Coke and Runnels Counties. It runs from US 277 about north of Bronte east and northeast to SH 153 (formerly FM 53) west of Winters.

FM 384 was designated on June 12, 1945, to run from FM 53 (now SH 153) northwest to Wilmeter. On October 18, 1954, the section from FM 383 to Wilmeter became part of FM 383, and the road was rerouted to end at US 277, replacing FM 1673 (there was also some new construction).

== RM 385 ==
Ranch to Market Road 385
- Location: Kimble County
- Length: 32.348 mi (52.059 km)
- Existed: June 11, 1945 (Note: RM 385 was originally designated as FM 385 from 1945 to 1956.)–present

Ranch to Market Road 385 (RM 385) is located in Kimble County. It runs from US 377 south of London southeast to US 290.

RM 385 was designated on June 11, 1945 as Farm to Market Road 385 (FM 385), running from US 290 northwest 10.0 miles (16.1 km). On November 23, 1948, a second section from US 183/283 south of London southeast 10.0 miles (16.1 km) was designated, creating a gap. On October 26, 1954, the gap was closed. By September 29, 1956, the road was redesignated as RM 385.

== RM 386 ==
Ranch to Market Road 386
- Location: Mason County
- Length: 15.896 mi (Note: RM 386 was designated as FM 386 from 1948 to 1956.) (25.582 km)
- Existed: June 11, 1945–present

Ranch to Market Road 386 (RM 386) is located in Mason County. It runs from US 87 in Mason to SH 71 near Fredonia.

RM 386 was designated on June 11, 1945, running from US 87 in Mason to Pontotoc, with a spur extending into Fredonia. Shortly after that, the road was changed to go from US 87 in Mason via Fredonia to Pontotoc, eliminating the spur. The section from Fredonia to Pontotoc was previously part of SH 81 (which ran from Llano to Brady). By 1948, the road was changed to Farm to Market Road 386 (FM 386). On October 29, 1948, the road was extended east 1.8 miles (2.9 km) to Hutchins School. On July 14, 1949, the road was extended to SH 29 west of Llano, replacing FM 968. On May 28, 1952, the section from Fredonia to SH 29 was transferred to FM 734 (which became part of SH 71 on September 1, 1965), shortening the road to its current route. The road was changed back to RM 386 on October 1, 1956.

== FM 387 ==
Farm to Market Road 387
- Location: Ellis County
- Length: 3.329 mi (5.358 km)
- Existed: April 25, 1978–present

Farm to Market Road 387 (FM 387) is located in Ellis County. It runs from I-35E south of Sterrett, east and southeast to FM 813.

FM 387 was designated on April 25, 1978, to run from I-35E south of Sterrett east to US 77. On September 26, 1979, the road was extended southeast to FM 813, its current terminus.

=== FM 387 (1945) ===
Farm to Market Road 387
- Location: Sterling and Coke counties
- Length: 34.7 mi (55.8 km)
- Existed: June 16, 1945–May 6, 1969

A previous route numbered FM 387 was designated on June 16, 1945, from US 87 at or near Sterling City northeast 12.0 miles (19.3 km) in Sterling County. The road was extended to Edith on September 9, 1947, and to Loop 229 in Robert Lee on July 22, 1949. On November 24, 1959, a spur connection from near Loop 229 to SH 208 was added. On December 16, 1960, the spur connection became part of FM 387, while the main route itself was transferred to Loop 229. On January 12, 1969, FM 387 was rerouted due to the construction of the Robert Lee Reservoir; the old route was redesignated as FM 1904. On May 6, 1969, FM 387 was cancelled and transferred to SH 158, which it was already signed, but not designated, as.

== FM 388 ==
Farm to Market Road 388
- Location: Tom Green County
- Length: 17.964 mi (28.910 km)
- Existed: November 21, 1956–present

Farm to Market Road 388 (FM 388) is located in Tom Green County.

FM 388 was designated on November 21, 1956, to run from US 87 (later Loop 378, now FM 1223) at Avenue L in San Angelo, eastward to East Loop (now Loop 306). On May 2, 1962, the road was extended east to FM 1692. On March 29, 1988, the road was extended west to US 87, completing its current route. On June 27, 1995, the section west of Loop 306 was internally redesignated as Urban Road 388 (UR 388), but reverted to FM 388 on November 15, 2018.

=== FM 388 (1945–1948) ===
Farm to Market Road 388
- Location: Washington County
- Existed: June 11, 1945–December 16, 1948

The first use of the FM 388 designation was in Washington County, from SH 36 south of Brenham via Muellersville to the Austin County line. FM 388 was cancelled on December 16, 1948, and combined with FM 109.

=== FM 388 (1951–1955) ===
Farm to Market Road 388
- Location: Denton County
- Length: 5.1 mi (8.2 km)
- Existed: May 23, 1951–September 9, 1955

The second use of the FM 388 designation was in Denton County, from SH 24 south through Lloyd to the former location of SH 24. FM 388 was cancelled on September 9, 1955, and transferred to FM 720.

== FM 389 ==
Farm to Market Road 389
- Location: Fayette, Austin, and Washington counties
- Length: 20.479 mi (32.958 km)
- Existed: June 11, 1945–present

Farm to Market Road 389 (FM 389) is located in Fayette, Austin, and Washington counties. It runs from FM 954 via Shelby to BS 36-J in Brenham.

FM 389 was designated on June 11, 1945, from Brenham to Klump. On December 17, 1952, the road was extended to US 290 southwest of Burton and to SH 36 (now BS 36-J) in Brenham. On October 31, 1958, FM 389 was rerouted; the old route was transferred to FM 2502, while FM 389 was routed over the old route of FM 2502 to FM 1457. On September 21, 1973 (connecting section designated September 5), it was extended to FM 954, replacing FM 3281.

== FM 390 ==
Farm to Market Road 390
- Location: Washington County
- Length: 29.574 mi (47.595 km)
- Existed: June 11, 1945–present

Farm to Market Road 390 (FM 390) is located in northern Washington County.

FM 390 begins at U.S. Route 290 in Burton and intersects SH 36 near Gay Hill before terminating at SH 105 northeast of Brenham. The road has a spur route at Independence connecting to the ruins of the 19th Century campus of Baylor University and the University of Mary Hardin-Baylor. The road also passes through the former communities of Longpoint and William Penn.

FM 390 begins at US 290 in Burton and follows W. Washington Street northeastward to N. Main Street where it intersects Spur 125. FM 390 turns northwest along Main Street and then northeast along La Bahia Trail intersecting FM 1697 before leaving Burton. The route merges with FM 1948 moving southwest for less than half a mile before branching off to the northeast. The route intersects FM 2679 at Longpoint and then crosses under the Burlington Northern Santa Fe Railway at Gay Hill through a 10.5-foot (3.2 m) single lane underpass, before intersecting SH 36. At Independence, FM 390's short spur route branches off to Old Baylor Park before FM 390 crosses FM 50. From Independence, the route passes to the east intersecting FM 2621 before reaching William Penn. The route then intersects FM 1935 and then turns south toward its terminus at SH 105.

FM 390 generally follows along a portion of the much older La Bahía Road from western Louisiana into southeast Texas used before European settlement. The road was extended by the Spanish to Goliad and used by American pioneers settling in Texas.

The first portion of the modern road to join the state's highway system was the section in Independence from Old Baylor Park to the present FM 50 which, along with FM 50 south of that juncture, was first designated as SH 211 sometime between 1933 and 1936. By 1939 that highway was decommissioned but reinstated in 1940. SH 211 was replaced by FM 50 and State Highway Spur 197 along the present FM 390 at Independence in 1943.

Two years before in Burton, State Highway Loop 125 was designated along the present Spur 125 and the portion of the present FM 390 between Spur 125 and US 290. FM 390 was initially designated on June 11, 1945, from Loop 125 in Burton to SH 36 near Gay Hill. On September 26, 1945, FM 390 was extended over Loop 125 to US 290, and Loop 125 was shortened to its present spur. On May 23, 1951, FM 390 was extended 4.0 miles (6.4 km) east of SH 36 and an additional 0.8 miles (1.3 km) on January 14, 1952. On October 26, 1954, the route was extended to FM 50 south of Independence and then from the junction of FM 50 and Spur 197 in Independence east to William Penn. The route at Independence was realigned on March 13, 1958, creating the route's spur and eliminating the route's concurrency with FM 50 south of town and replacing Spur 197. FM 390 was extended south of William Penn on November 5, 1971, to a portion of SH 90 that would be renumbered as SH 105 in 1973.

In 1995, the Texas Legislature passed a law recognizing FM 390 as a scenic highway and directing TxDOT to erect route markers indicating the route number and the road's scenic status. In response, TxDOT erected along the route a shields unique among the state's Farm to Market Roads with a distinctive brown background resembling the shields of the state's Recreational Roads.

Junction list

The entire route is in Washington County.

Location	mi	km	Destinations	Notes
Burton	0.0	0.0	US 290 – Giddings, Brenham	Western terminus
Burton	0.7	1.1	Spur 125 (North Main Street)	
Burton	1.0	1.6	FM 1697	
	3.5	5.6	FM 1948 north – Quarry	Northwestern end of FM 1948 concurrency
	3.9	6.3	FM 1948 south	Southeastern end of FM 1948 concurrency
Longpoint	7.3	11.7	FM 2679	
	11.7	18.8	SH 36 – Caldwell, Brenham	
Independence	20.3	32.7	FM Spur 390 (Old Baylor Road)	
Independence	20.6	33.2	FM 50 – Clay	
	22.5	36.2	FM 2621 – Sandy Hill	
	24.8	39.9	FM 1935	
	29.7	47.8	SH 105 – Brenham, Navasota	Eastern terminus
1.000 mi = 1.609 km; 1.000 km = 0.621 mi: Concurrency terminus

=== FM Spur 390 ===
Farm to Market Road 390 Spur
- Location: Independence
- Length: 0.128 mi (206 m)
- Existed: 1958–present

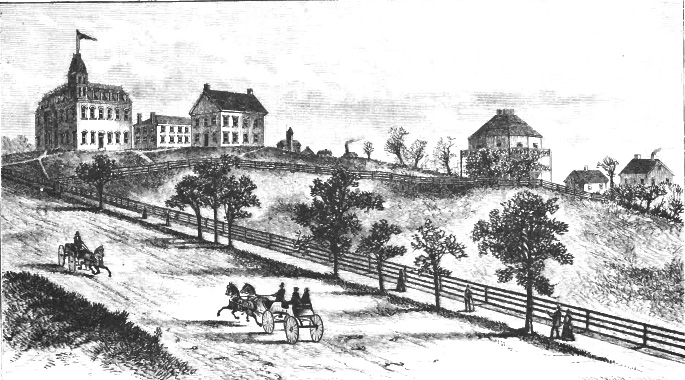
Road leading to Baylor University at Independence

Farm to Market Spur 390 (FM Spur 390) is a short spur route of FM 390 at Independence that branches off of its parent route along Old Baylor Road to the west terminating at Old Baylor Park, the original location of Baylor University, chartered in 1845 by the Congress of the Republic of Texas and opened the following year, and the University of Mary Hardin Baylor, formerly Baylor University's women's department. Both colleges relocated to their current campuses in Waco and Belton respectively in 1886.

The spur was the northern terminus of SH 211 beginning between 1933 and 1936. SH 211 was decommissioned by 1939, but was reinstated in 1940. SH 211 was again decommissioned in 1942, and the spur became the western terminus of Spur 197. SS 197 was incorporated into FM 390 in 1958.

== FM 391 ==
Farm to Market Road 391
- Location: Robertson County
- Length: 13.286 mi (21.382 km)
- Existed: June 22, 1945–present

Farm to Market Road 391 (FM 391) is located in Robertson County. It runs from US 79/SH 6 in Hearne to FM 46 in Wheelock.

FM 391 was designated on June 22, 1945 from SH 6/US 79 in Hearne to FM 46 Wheelock. On June 12, 1968, the road was relocated on Bronw Street in Wheelock. On December 20, 1973, the road was extended on Cedar and Brenken Streets from US 79/US 190 to SH 6/US 79.

== FM 392 ==
Farm to Market Road 392
- Location: Hardeman and Wilbarger counties
- Length: 6.891 mi (11.090 km)
- Existed: October 15, 1954–present

Farm to Market Road 392 (FM 392) is located in Hardeman and Wilbarger counties. It runs from FM 91 south of Chillicothe, southeast and northeast to FM 925.

FM 392 was designated on October 15, 1954, to run from FM 91 southward 1.9 miles (3.1 km) to an agricultural experiment station, replacing a section of FM 91, which was rerouted. On November 21, 1956, the road was extended southeast and northeast to FM 925, completing its current route.

=== FM 392 (1945) ===
Farm to Market Road 392
- Location: Robertson County
- Existed: June 22, 1945–May 15, 1954

A previous route numbered FM 392 was designated on June 22, 1945, in two sections: one section ran from Bremond to Nesbitt and the other section ran from Franklin to US 79 at Owensville. The sections were connected on November 23, 1948. FM 392 was cancelled on May 15, 1954, and combined with FM 46.

== FM 393 ==
Farm to Market Road 393
- Location: Dimmit and Zavala counties
- Length: 14.996 mi (24.134 km)
- Existed: June 16, 1945–present

Farm to Market Road 393 (FM 393) is located in Dimmit and Zavala counties. It runs from US 277 northwest of Carrizo Springs northward to Cometa then eastward to US 83 north of Crystal City.

FM 393 was designated on June 16, 1945, to run from Cometa south to the Dimmit–Zavala county line. On July 9, 1945, the road was extended south to SH 85. On February 17, 1952, the road was extended northeast 9.5 miles (15.3 km) to FM 1668. On May 12, 1955, the road was extended east to US 83, replacing a section of FM 1668 and completing its current route.

== FM 394 ==
Farm to Market Road 394
- Location: Kerr County
- Length: 0.557 mi (896 m)
- Existed: July 11, 1968–present

Farm to Market Road 394 (FM 394) is located in Kerrville. The highway is known locally as Francisco Lemos Street.

FM 394 begins at an intersection with Loop 98 near Peterson Regional Medical Center and the Kerrville State Hospital. The highway crosses over the Guadalupe River before having an intersection with Water Street at a traffic signal. FM 394 travels another block before ending at an intersection with SH 27.

The current FM 394 was designated on July 11, 1968, along the current route.

=== FM 394 (1945) ===
Farm to Market Road 394
- Location: Zavala and Frio counties
- Existed: June 16, 1945–October 30, 1964

A previous route numbered FM 394 was designated on June 16, 1945, from La Pryor to Batesville as a replacement of a portion of SH 76. On July 15, 1949, the road was extended east 2.3 miles (3.7 km). On February 21, 1950, the road was extended east 32.7 miles (52.6 km) to US 81. On March 29, 1962, the road was extended southeast 4.2 miles (6.8 km) to a county road. The section from US 81 southeast 4.2 miles (6.8 km) was cancelled on November 23, 1962, in exchange for creating FM 2779; the remainder of FM 394 was cancelled on October 30, 1964, and transferred back to SH 76 (now US 57).

== FM 395 ==
Farm to Market Road 395
- Location: Dimmit and Zavala counties
- Length: 10.639 mi (17.122 km)
- Existed: June 16, 1945–present

Farm to Market Road 395 (FM 395) is located in Dimmit and Zavala counties. It runs from FM 65 northwest of Brundage to FM 1025.

FM 65 was designated on June 16, 1945, to run from FM 65 in Crystal City east 4.8 miles (7.7 km) to a road intersection. On November 23, 1948, the road was extended north 4.0 miles (6.4 km). On February 21, 1950, the road was extended north 2.0 miles (3.2 km) to FM 1025. On October 31, 1958, the road was rerouted so that it had its south end at FM 65 northwest of Brundage; the old route west to Crystal City was redesignated as FM 582.

== FM 396 ==
Farm to Market Road 396
- Location: Hidalgo County
- Length: 4.632 mi (7.454 km)
- Existed: May 5, 1966–present

Farm to Market Road 396 (FM 396) is located in Hidalgo County. It runs from the Anzalduas Port of Entry at the Anzalduas International Bridge north to US 83 Business.

FM 396 was designated on May 5, 1966, from US 83 (now I-2), 1 mile (1.6 km) east of FM 1016, north to Loop 374 (now US 83 Business). On June 27, 1995, the route was transferred to Urban Road 396 (UR 396). On February 23, 2006, the road was extended south to connect to the proposed bridge, which opened to traffic on December 15, 2009. The designation of the route reverted to FM 396 with the elimination of the Urban Road system on November 15, 2018.

The entire route is in Mission, Hidalgo County.

mi	km	Destinations	Notes
0.0	0.0	Anzalduas International Bridge over the Rio Grande	
0.2	0.32	FM 1016 (Military Highway)	Interchange
2.7	4.3	Trinity Road	Interchange
3.6	5.8	I-2 / US 83 (Expressway 83) – La Joya, McAllen	I-2 exit 137
4.6	7.4	Bus. US 83 (9th Street)	
1.000 mi = 1.609 km; 1.000 km = 0.621 mi

=== FM 396 (1945) ===
Farm to Market Road 396
- Location: Yoakum and Terry counties
- Existed: June 11, 1945–February 10, 1966

A previous route numbered FM 396 was designated in Yoakum County on June 11, 1945, from SH 214 5 miles (8.0 km) north of Denver City, east to Bennett. On July 20, 1948, a section from Wellman in Terry County to the Yoakum County line was added, creating a gap in the route. This gap was closed on May 23, 1951. FM 396 was cancelled on February 10, 1966, and combined with FM 213.

== FM 397 ==
Farm to Market Road 397
- Location: Williamson County
- Length: 3.456 mi (5.562 km)
- Existed: April 25, 1978–present

Farm to Market Road 397 (FM 397) is located in Taylor in Williamson County. The highway forms the northwestern section of a partial beltway around the town, running from US 79 to SH 95.

The current FM 397 was designated in 1978 along the current route.

=== FM 397 (1945) ===
Farm to Market Road 397
- Location: Garza County
- Existed: June 11, 1945–September 19, 1968

A previous route numbered FM 397 was designated on June 11, 1945, from US 84 northwest of Post to Pleasant Valley. FM 397 was cancelled on September 19, 1968, and combined with FM 399.

== FM 398 ==
Farm to Market Road 398
- Location: Collingsworth County
- Length: 1.074 mi (1.728 km)
- Existed: May 28, 1982–present

Farm to Market Road 398 (FM 398) is located in Collingsworth County. The highway begins at FM 338 east of Wellington and travels northward to SH 203. The road runs parallel to US 83 for its entire length, traveling about a mile east of that route.

The current FM 398 was designated in 1982 along the current route.

=== FM 398 (1945) ===
Farm to Market Road 398
- Location: Garza County
- Existed: June 11, 1945–September 19, 1968

A previous route numbered FM 398 was designated on June 11, 1945, from US 380 west of Post south to Graham Chapel in Garza County. FM 398 was cancelled on September 19, 1968, and combined with FM 399.

== FM 399 ==
Farm to Market Road 399
- Location: Garza County
- Length: 9.289 mi (Note: The certified length given is shorter than the actual mileage, as the Texas Department of Transportation description of FM 399 considers it to be discontinuous at rather than concurrent with US 380.) (14.949 km)
- Existed: June 11, 1945–present

Farm to Market Road 399 (FM 399) is located in Garza County. It runs from Pleasant Valley to US 380, and from US 380 to FM 1313 at Graham.

FM 399 was designated on June 11, 1945, from US 380 west of Post north to Close City. On November 20, 1951, the road was extended north to US 84. On September 19, 1968, the US 84-Pleasant Valley section and the US 380-FM 1313 sections were added, replacing FM 397 and FM 398 and creating a concurrency with US 380.

Junction list

The entire route is in Garza County.

Location	mi	km	Destinations	Notes
	0.0	0.0	FM 1313	
	2.1	3.4	US 380 east – Post	South end of US 380 overlap
	3.1	5.0	US 380 west – Tahoka	North end of US 380 overlap
	8.3	13.4	FM 2282	
	9.1	14.6	US 84 – Lubbock, Post	
	10.3	16.6	County Road 125	
1.000 mi = 1.609 km; 1.000 km = 0.621 mi: Concurrency terminus
