= La Poynor High School =

LaPoynor High School

Location
- 13155 US Hwy 175 E Larue, Texas 75770; United States; 32.0970°N 95.6388°W

Information
- School type: Public high school
- School district: LaPoynor Independent School District
- Principal: Eric Carpenter
- Staff: 22.35 (FTE)
- Grades: 9-12
- Enrollment: 178 (2023–2024)
- Student to teacher ratio: 7.96
- Colors: Purple & White
- Athletics conference: UIL Class 2A (non-football participant)
- Mascot: Flyer/Lady Flyer
- Yearbook: The Flyer
- Website: LaPoynor High School

LaPoynor High School is a public high school located just outside the unincorporated community of Larue, Texas, USA and classified as a 2A school by the UIL. It is a part of the LaPoynor Independent School District located in southeastern Henderson County. After World War II, the schools in Larue and Poynor consolidated to form the LaPoynor Independent School District. In 2015, the school was rated "Met Standard" by the Texas Education Agency.

== Athletics ==
The LaPoynor Flyers compete in these sports -

Cross Country, Basketball, Track, Baseball & Softball

=== State Titles ===
- Boys Basketball -
  - 1972(B), 1973(B), 1975(B), 1985(1A), 1995(2A)
- Girls Basketball -
  - 2002(1A/D1), 2003(1A/D1)
- Boys Golf -
  - 2007(1A)

==== State Finalist ====
- Boys Basketball -
  - 1974(B), 1979(1A), 2020 (1A), 2023 (2A)
- Girls Basketball -
  - 1983(1A), 1988(1A), 1989(1A), 2018 (1A)
