= KCMK =

KCMK may refer to:

- KCMK-LP, a low-power radio station (97.3 FM) licensed to serve La Rue, Texas, United States
- KMXV, a radio station (93.3 FM) licensed to serve Kansas City, Missouri, United States, which held the call sign KCMK from 1958 to 1971
