= Carl Reynolds =

American baseball player (1903–1978)

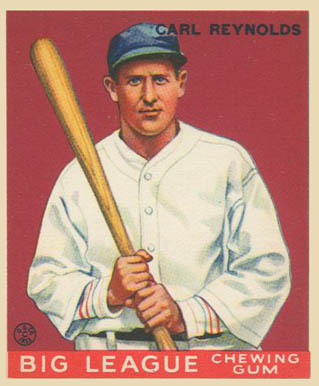
- Outfielder
- Born: February 1, 1903; LaRue, Texas, U.S.
- Died: May 29, 1978 (aged 75); Houston, Texas, U.S.
- Batted: Right Threw: Right

MLB debut
- September 1, 1927, for the Chicago White Sox

Last MLB appearance
- October 1, 1939, for the Chicago Cubs

MLB statistics
- Batting average: .302
- Home runs: 80
- Runs batted in: 699
- Stats at Baseball Reference

Teams
- Chicago White Sox (1927–1931); Washington Senators (1932); St. Louis Browns (1933); Boston Red Sox (1934–1935); Washington Senators (1936); Chicago Cubs (1937–1939)

Carl Nettles Reynolds (February 1, 1903 – May 29, 1978) was an American outfielder in Major League Baseball who played for the Chicago White Sox (1927–1931), Washington Senators (1932, 1936), St. Louis Browns (1933), Boston Red Sox (1934–1935) and Chicago Cubs (1937–1939). He was born in LaRue, Texas, and attended Southwestern University. Reynolds betted and threw right-handed.

== Career ==
Reynolds was a consistent hitter who batted .300 six times. He played all three outfield positions, but was suited to right field, especially since he had a good throwing arm.

Reynolds enjoyed his best season in 1930, with career highs in batting average (.359), home runs (22), RBI (104), runs (103), hits (202), triples (18) and games played (138). On July 2, he hit three home runs, two of which were inside-the-park, in consecutive at bats. The feat was the first instance in MLB history to be done in each of the first three innings of a game.

In the first game of a Senators-Yankees doubleheader on July 4, 1932, Reynolds sustained a broken jaw when he was punched by Bill Dickey after a collision at home plate. Dickey was suspended for 30 days and fined $1000 and Reynolds did not play again until August 13.

In his 13-year career, Reynolds was a .302 hitter with 80 home runs and 699 RBI over 1,222 games. Defensively, he posted a .970 fielding percentage at all three outfield positions.

In November 1971, Reynolds was announced as one of five to be inducted into the Texas Sports Hall of Fame. Reynolds died on May 29, 1978 at Houston Methodist Hospital in Houston, Texas after an extended illness at the age of 75.

== See also ==
- List of Major League Baseball career triples leaders
