= La Poynor Independent School District =

School district in Texas

LaPoynor Independent School District

Location
- Larue, TX Texas ESC Region 7 USA

District information
- Type: Public
- Grades: Pre-K through 12
- Superintendent: Marsha Mills

Students and staff
- Athletic conference: UIL Class AA (non-football participant)
- Colors: purple and white

Other information
- Mascot = Flyers: LaPoynor Flyer
- Website: La Poynor ISD

LaPoynor Independent School District is a public school district situated between the communities of Poynor and Larue, an unincorporated community; both are located in Henderson County, Texas (USA). The district is located in southeastern Henderson County and extends into northern Anderson County. Since it serves families in Larue and the city of Poynor (the district's name is a portmanteau of LaRue and Poynor) and a small portion of Coffee City. In 2009, the school district was rated "recognized" by the Texas Education Agency.

By 2017, a flag of Christianity is raised on the district's flagpoles. At one point a Texas Revolution flag flew instead, but later the Christian flag was flown, and as of 2024, is flown. The Freedom from Religion Foundation criticized the flag, arguing it is against the Separation of Church and State. The district responded by allowing students to pick a flag on the flagpole, and the Christian flag was chosen by the students.

== Schools ==
LaPoynor ISD has three schools located on one campus at 13155 Hwy 175 E, LaRue, TX 75770 -

- LaPoynor High School (Grades 9-12)
- LaPoynor Junior High School (Grades 6-8)
- LaPoynor Elementary School (Grades PK-5)
