= Leagueville, Texas =

Unincorporated community in Henderson County, Texas, United States

- Unincorporated community
- Location within Texas Location within the United States
- Coordinates: 32°13′52″N 95°39′19″W
- Country: United States
- State: Texas
- County: Henderson
- Elevation: 420 ft (130 m)
- Time zone: UTC-6 (Central (CST))
  - Summer (DST): UTC-5 (CDT)
- ZIP Code: 75778
- Area codes: 430, 903
- GNIS feature ID: 1378572

Leagueville is an unincorporated community in Henderson County, Texas, United States. It is located along Farm to Market Road 317 and Farm to Market Road 607.

== See also ==
- List of unincorporated communities in Texas
