= Poynor, Texas =

Town in United States

- Town
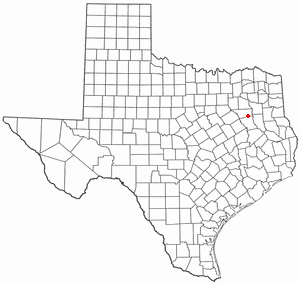
- Location of Poynor, Texas

- Coordinates: 32°04′46″N 95°35′33″W
- Country: United States
- State: Texas
- County: Henderson

Area
  - Total: 2.36 sq mi (6.11 km^{2})
  - Land: 2.36 sq mi (6.11 km^{2})
  - Water: 0 sq mi (0.00 km^{2})
- Elevation: 466 ft (142 m)

Population (2020)
  - Total: 287
  - Density: 122/sq mi (47.0/km^{2})
- Time zone: UTC-6 (Central (CST))
  - Summer (DST): UTC-5 (CDT)
- ZIP code: 75782
- Area codes: 430, 903
- FIPS code: 48-59192
- GNIS feature ID: 2412505

Poynor is a town in Henderson County, Texas, United States. The population was 287 at the 2020 census.

== Geography ==
Poynor is located in southeastern Henderson County 17 miles (27 km) southeast of Athens, the county seat, and 21 miles (34 km) northwest of Jacksonville.

According to the United States Census Bureau, Poynor has a total area of 2.4 square miles (6.1 km^{2}), all land.

== Demographics ==
Historical population
Census	Pop.	Note	%±
1980	272		—
1990	237		−12.9%
2000	314		32.5%
2010	305		−2.9%
2020	287		−5.9%
U.S. Decennial Census; 2020 Census

At the 2000 census there were 314 people, 112 households, and 89 families in the town. The population density was 132.7 inhabitants per square mile (51.2/km^{2}). There were 121 housing units at an average density of 51.1 per square mile (19.7/km^{2}). The racial makeup of the town was 92.68% White, 5.41% African American, 0.96% Native American, 0.32% from other races, and 0.64% from two or more races. Hispanic or Latino of any race were 4.46%.

Of the 112 households 35.7% had children under the age of 18 living with them, 70.5% were married couples living together, 8.0% had a female householder with no husband present, and 20.5% were non-families. 16.1% of households were one person and 11.6% were one person aged 65 or older. The average household size was 2.80 and the average family size was 3.09.

The age distribution was 26.8% under the age of 18, 8.0% from 18 to 24, 27.7% from 25 to 44, 22.6% from 45 to 64, and 15.0% 65 or older. The median age was 36 years. For every 100 females, there were 90.3 males. For every 100 females age 18 and over, there were 87.0 males.

The median household income was $39,375 and the median family income was $38,750. Males had a median income of $33,125 versus $20,278 for females. The per capita income for the town was $14,829. About 13.6% of families and 10.1% of the population were below the poverty line, including 10.0% of those under age 18 and 7.8% of those age 65 or over.

== Education ==
The town is served by the LaPoynor Independent School District.
