= LaRue, Texas =

- Unincorporated community
- Location within Texas Location within the United States
- Coordinates: 32°07′01″N 95°40′29″W
- Country: United States
- State: Texas
- County: Henderson
- Elevation: 479 ft (146 m)
- Time zone: UTC-6 (Central (CST))
  - Summer (DST): UTC-5 (CDT)
- ZIP codes: 75770
- Area codes: 430, 903
- GNIS feature ID: 1339642

LaRue (sometimes seen or written as Larue) is an unincorporated community located in Henderson County, Texas, United States. At the time of the 2000 census, the population was estimated at 160.

== Overview ==
The La Poynor Independent School District serves area students.

== Notable person ==
- Carl Reynolds (1903-1978), baseball outfielder during the late 1920s and 1930s
