= Death Penalty Focus =

US non-profit organization

- Formation: 1988; 38 years ago
- Type: nonprofit organization
- Tax ID no.: 95-4153420
- Purpose: Abolition of death penalty
- Headquarters: 500 Capitol Mall Suite 2350 Sacramento, CA 95814
- Region served: United States
- Members: 150,000
- Website: deathpenalty.org

Death Penalty Focus (DPF) is a non-profit organization dedicated to the abolition of the death penalty through public education, grassroots and political organizing, media engagement, and coalition building. DPF also serves as a support network and as a liaison among anti-death penalty groups nationwide and across the world.

The group opposes the death penalty as "ineffective, racist, and fiscally inefficient." In 1999, the organization said the death penalty is "an ineffective and brutally simplistic response to the serious and complex problem of violent crime.” DPF has partnered with numerous families of victims of violent crime to abolish the death penalty.

DPF is governed by a Board of Directors composed of activists, political, religious, and civic leaders, along with legal scholars and attorneys involved in death penalty litigation. In addition, DPF has an Advisory Board composed of community and religious leaders, celebrities, writers, and representatives of labor and human rights organizations who support anti-death penalty work.

== History ==
=== Founding ===
DPF was founded in 1988 by a group of people committed to the abolition of the death penalty in California. Former Governor Pat Brown became a founding member of DPF. Michael Millman was also a founding member of DPF. The goal was to build a broad-based coalition against the death penalty. The L.A. Times wrote that DPF "has become the clearinghouse for a variety of rallies, leafletting and marches throughout the state." Mike Farrell has served as president of DPF since 1994.

=== Rallies and protests to stop executions ===
In the early 1990s, Pat Clark served as the executive director. The organization was based out of Oakland at that time. DPF organized rallies and protests against the execution of Robert Harris. Clark spoke out in opposition to lethal injection: “It is intended to put a humane face on killing, when reality is that the death penalty, capital punishment, is a barbaric practice that has no place in a civilized society. We object strenuously to efforts to make the death penalty more palatable to the public.” Claudia King served as executive director of the organization.

In 1995, Lance Lindsey took over as the Executive Director. Lindsey organized protests outside of San Quentin State Prison. Lindsey told SFGate: "We are sensitive and compassionate to the horrible suffering of these victims and their families ... but we're just saying that using violence to stop more violence just perpetuates the cycle of violence." DPF, under Lindsey's leadership helped organize several coalitions: California People of Faith Working against the Death Penalty, Californians for a Moratorium on Executions, and the California Crime Victims for Alternatives to the Death Penalty.

In 2004, DPF joined the Committee to Save Kevin Cooper. They protested, held a press conference, and distributed flyers to the public. The organization played a role in organizing opposition protests to the execution of Stanley Tookie Williams in 2005

=== Abolition campaigns ===
DPF has been described as "the strongest voice in California’s abolition movement" by San Francisco Magazine.

In 2005, DPF worked with the United States Conference of Catholic Bishops and others to oppose the death penalty. The campaign distributed leaflets at churches, encouraged religious leaders to speak about the death penalty, and they collected signatures for a moratorium campaign to pause executions in California.

In 2011, Jeanne Woodford, the former warden of San Quentin Prison, took over as executive director. Shortly after, DPF led the campaign for 2012 California Proposition 34 that would have abolished the death penalty in California.

In 2015, Farrell spoke at the annual meeting of the Oregonians for Alternatives to the Death Penalty. He said in a subsequent phone interview: "What we don't understand in this country is the cost to us, and I don't mean financial. It's the terrible social (and) moral cost we haven't come to grips with."

In 2023, DPF President Mike Farrell praised California Governor Gavin Newsom's decision to dismantle the state's death row.

== DPF Awards ==
=== The Norman Felton and Denise Aubuchon Humanitarian Award ===
Supreme Court of California Chief Justice Rose Bird (1997), Bud Welch (his daughter Julie was a victim of the 1995 Oklahoma City bombing) (1998), Linda and Peter Biehl (1999), Rabbi Leonard Beerman (2000), Murder Victims’ Families for Reconciliation (2001), Rev. James Lawson (activist) (2002), Patch Adams (2003), Aqeela Sherrills (2004), Bishop Henry Williamson (2005), George F. Regas (2006), Robert Greenwald (2007), Azim Khamisa (2008), Bryan Stevenson (2009), Sister Suzanne Jabro, CSJ (2010), Sisters of St. Joseph of Orange (2011), Greg Boyle (2012), Javier Stauring (2013), Dolores Huerta (2016)

=== Abolition Award ===
Rubin Carter (1996), Kiefer Sutherland (1996), Sean Penn (1997), CA State Senator John Burton (American politician) (1998), Ossie Davis and Ruby Dee (2000), Roger Mahony (2001), Danny Glover (2002), Ramona Ripston (2003), Gabino Zavala (2004), Ted Kennedy (2005), Barry Scheck (2006), Thomas Gumbleton (2007), Jon Corzine and New Jerseyans for Alternatives to the Death Penalty (2008), Nick McKeown (2009), Richard Dieter (2010), Death Penalty Clinic at UC Berkeley School of Law (Elisabeth Semel & Ty Alper) (2011), West Memphis Three and their defense team (2012), 2012 California Proposition 34 leaders (2013), Dale Baich (2015), Richard Branson (2016), Bernie Sanders (2017), Renny Cushing (2019), Michael L. Radelet (2021), Virginia Abolition Movement Leaders: Ralph Norman, Scott Surovell, Michael P. Mullin, Joseph Giarratano, among others (2022), Diann Rust-Tierney (2023)

=== Lifetime Achievement Award ===
Mervyn Dymally (2006), Michael Millman (2014), Leonard Beerman (2015), James Lawson (activist) (2018), Anthony G. Amsterdam (2019)

=== Justice in the Arts and Media Award ===
Studs Terkel (2002), Jessica Blank and Erik Jensen (actor) (2003), Robert Wise (2004), Bradley Whitford and Jane Kaczmarek (2005), Carl Reiner (2006), David E. Kelley (2007), John Grisham (2008), Nancy Miller (2009), Alec Baldwin (2010), Hilary Swank (2011), MC Hammer (2012), James Cromwell (2013), Peter Sarsgaard and Veena Sud, on behalf of The Cast and Crew of “The Killing (American TV series)” (2014), Alex Gibney, Brad Hebert, Laura Michalchyshyn on behalf of Death Row Stories (2015), Jackson Browne (2016), Joan Baez (2017), Elizabeth Bruenig (2023)

=== Rose Elizabeth Bird Commitment to Justice Award ===
Steve Allen (1998), Norman Jewison (1999), David E. Kelley, Robert Breech, and the Cast of The Practice (2000), Aaron Sorkin, Thomas Schlamme and the Cast of The West Wing (2001), Stanley Sheinbaum (2002), George Ryan (2003), Rosalynn Carter (2004), Andy and Deborah Rappaport (2005), Victoria Riskin and David W. Rintels (2006), Max Palevsky and Jodie Evans (2007), Sarah Timberman and Ed Redlich (2008), John Van de Kamp (2009), Sherry and Leo Frumkin (2010), Thomas Schlamme (2011), Denise Foderaro Quattrone (2012), Death row exonerees Kwame Ajamu, Ricky Jackson and Wiley Bridgeman along with their attorneys (2015), John Paul Stevens (2019), Bryan Stevenson (2021), Paula Mitchell, Andy Wilson, and Maurice Hastings (2023)

=== The Mario Cuomo Act of Courage Award ===
Mario Cuomo (1996), Jesse Jackson (1997), Larry Fox (on behalf of the American Bar Association) (1998), David Protess and Lawrence Marshall (1999), Senator Russ Feingold (2000), Governor George Ryan (2001), Barbara Lee (2002), Vicente Fox (2003), Harry Belafonte (2004), Sister Helen Prejean (2005), Dorothy Ehrlich (2006), Kamala Harris (2007), Julian Bond (2008), Jeanne Woodford (2009), Paul Haggis (2010), Lance Lindsey (2011), Martin O'Malley (2014), Judy Clarke and Speedy Rice (2017), Mike Farrell (2018), Dick Durbin and Ayanna Pressley (2022), Josh Shapiro (2023)

=== Special Awards to Activist Exonerees ===
Gloria Killian, Greg Wilhoit, Tom Goldstein (2006)

=== Special Recognition for Outstanding Achievement on behalf of Social Justice ===
Melody Ermachild, Henry Weinstein, and Dr. Arthur Zitrin (2008)

=== The Mike Farrell Human Rights Award ===
Madeleine Haas Russell (1997), Mike Farrell (2006), George McGovern (2007), Sidney Sheinberg (2008), Bill Richardson (2009), Stephen Bright (2011), Norman Felton (2013), Juan E. Méndez (2014), Sharon Brous (2021)

=== Courageous Leadership Award ===
Pat Quinn (politician) (2011)

=== International Abolition Award ===
Robert Badinter (2022)

== See also ==
- Helen Prejean, a U.S. anti-death penalty campaigner and DPF advisory board member
- Jeanne Woodford, Consultant for Death Penalty Focus
- James Lawson, Board Member, Death Penalty Focus
- Michael Millman, founding member
