= Ledden =

Ledden is a surname. Notable people with the surname include:

- Emma Ledden (born 1977), Irish author, television presenter, model, and writer
- James Ledden (died 1927), Irish politician
- Peter Ledden (1943–2025), English cricketer

== See also ==
- Leden
