= Ledin =

Ledin is a surname. Notable people with this surname include:

- George Ledin (born 1946), American professor of computer science
- Per Ledin (born 1978), Swedish ice hockey player
- Tomas Ledin (born 1952), Swedish singer, songwriter, guitarist, and producer
- Wendell L. Ledin Sr. (1897-1965), American businessman and politician

== See also ==
- Leden
