= Michael Millman =

American lawyer

Michael G. Millman
- Born: July 9, 1939; Brooklyn, New York
- Died: May 31, 2014 (aged 74)
- Education: Harvard University (B.S.); University of California, Berkeley (M.S.); Yale Law School (J.D.)
- Occupation: Appellate Defense Attorney
- Known for: Founder of California Appellate Project
- Spouse: Cynthia Taylor Millman
- Children: Laura, David and Matthew
- Parent(s): Sidney and Dorothy Millman

Michael G. Millman (July 9, 1939 – May 31, 2014) was an American criminal defense lawyer, founder of the California Appellate Project, and an anti-death penalty activist.

== Family and education ==
Michael Millman was born in Brooklyn, N.Y., and he grew up in Summit, N.J. Millman was the only child of Sidney, a physicist, and Dorothy, a teacher. Millman graduated from Harvard University in 1960 with a degree in physics and obtained a master's degree in physics from UC Berkeley. Moved by the social justice activism of the 1960s, Millman decided to study law—instead of science—and graduated from Yale Law School in 1969. During the civil rights movement he worked with, and was deeply inspired by, Alabama Attorney Fred Gray, who had represented Dr. Martin Luther King, Rosa Parks.

Millman married Cynthia Taylor Millman. He had three children Dr. Laura Dillard, David Millman, and Matthew Millman. He had three stepchildren from his marriage to Cynthia; and 13 grandchildren.

== Legal career ==
After law school, Millman worked for the Alameda County public defender for about six years. He then joined the Office of the State Public Defender and became its death penalty coordinator after state lawmakers reinstated capital punishment in 1977.

In 1983, The State Bar of California created The California Appellate Project as a legal resource center to implement the constitutional right to counsel for indigent persons facing Capital punishment in California. At around the time of its founding, Millman became the director of CAP. Millman served as director of CAP for 30 years. In his role at CAP, he oversaw the efforts to assist private lawyers representing the more than 700 people on California's death row.

Millman was also active in the California Attorneys for Criminal Justice, serving as President of its Board of Governors in 1984. He also served on a Supreme Court committee formed to improve the timely handling of capital case appeals and habeas corpus petitions. In 2013, Millman was awarded CACJ's Significant Contributions to Criminal Justice Lifetime Achievement Award.

Michael Millman was a founding member of Death Penalty Focus, which is committed to the abolition of the death penalty. Millman was also affiliated with the Death Penalty Information Center—working with Anthony Amsterdam—and served as President of its board. In April 2014, Death Penalty Focus awarded Mr. Millman a Lifetime Achievement Award for his "unwavering commitment to providing high-quality representation to indigent people on death row." He occasionally lectured at Stanford Law School.

== Death and tributes ==
On May 31, 2014, Mr. Millman died from pancreatic cancer. Chief Justice of the California Supreme Court Tani G. Cantil-Sakauye said of Millman: "Michael Millman was a pillar of the capital defense bar, a hero to many, and a true gentleman. He will be sorely missed, and we are deeply saddened by this great loss." Lance Lindsey, the administrative director of CAP, said: "Michael was a profoundly kind and big-hearted man who dedicated his whole life to advancing social justice and, especially, to 'being the change we wish to see in the world' by daily acts of compassion and generosity." The president of the American Bar Association James Silkenat paid tribute to Millman: "As someone who also cares deeply about justice, I thank you for all that you have done to make this world a better place. You are the kind of lawyer and human being that we all aspire to be."
