= Sonoma State University =

Public university in Rohnert Park, California, US

Coordinates: 38°20′23″N 122°40′25″W

- Former name: Sonoma State College (1960–1978)
- Motto: Lux Mentis, Lux Orbis (Latin)
- Motto in English: "Light of the Mind, Light of the World"
- Type: Public university
- Established: 1960; 66 years ago
- Parent institution: California State University
- Accreditation: WSCUC
- Academic affiliations: COPLAC; Space-grant
- Endowment: $70.5 million (2023-24)
- Budget: $147.4 million (2024)
- President: Michael E. Spagna
- Faculty: 450 (fall 2024)
- Administrative staff: 668 (fall 2024)
- Students: 5,000 (fall 2025)
- Undergraduates: 4,392 (fall 2025)
- Postgraduates: 608 (fall 2025)
- Location: Rohnert Park, California, United States
- Campus: 269 acres (109 ha); Large suburb
- Newspaper: Sonoma State Star
- Colors: Navy, Columbia blue, and white
- Nickname: Seawolves
- Sporting affiliations: None
- Mascot: Lobo the Seawolf
- Website: www.sonoma.edu

Sonoma State University (SSU, Sonoma State, or Sonoma) is a public university in Rohnert Park, Sonoma County, California, United States. It is part of the California State University system and has three academic colleges: the College of Education, Counseling and Ethnic Studies; the College of Humanities, Social Sciences and the Arts; and the College of Science, Technology and Business. The school offers 62 bachelor's degree programs, 13 master's degree programs, and 24 teaching credentials.

Sonoma State's enrollment in fall 2025 was 5,000, including 4,392 undergraduate students and 608 post baccalaureate/graduate students. The university is accredited by the WASC Senior College and University Commission and is a federally designated Hispanic-serving institution.

== History ==
=== Founding ===
Sonoma State University was established by the California State Legislature in 1960 to be part of the California State College system, with significant involvement of the faculty from San Francisco State University. As with all California State Colleges, Sonoma State later became part of the California State University system. Sonoma opened for the first time in 1961, with an initial enrollment of 274 students. Classes offered took place in leased buildings in Rohnert Park, where the college offered its first four-year Bachelor of Arts degree in Elementary Education. The small first graduating class received their degrees in the parking lot of the temporary campus. The college moved in 1966 to its present campus of 215 acres (87 ha) upon the completion of its two main classroom halls, Stevenson Hall, named for politician Adlai Stevenson II, and Darwin Hall, named for Charles Darwin. The 1966 graduating class became the first to receive their degrees at the new campus.

=== Early development ===
As enrollment increased, Sonoma State built more on-campus facilities, including Ives Hall for performing arts, University Commons for dining, a small library, and a gymnasium. These buildings followed the physical master plan of the college which stated that the facilities would be urban in character, defining the use of smooth concrete building façades with landscaped courtyards. Among the landscaping features added with these facilities were the "Campus Lakes", two small reservoirs located behind the Commons next to Commencement Lawn, the site of the university's annual commencement ceremonies, as well as one lake near a housing facility, Beaujolais Village; the lakes are home to local waterfowl.

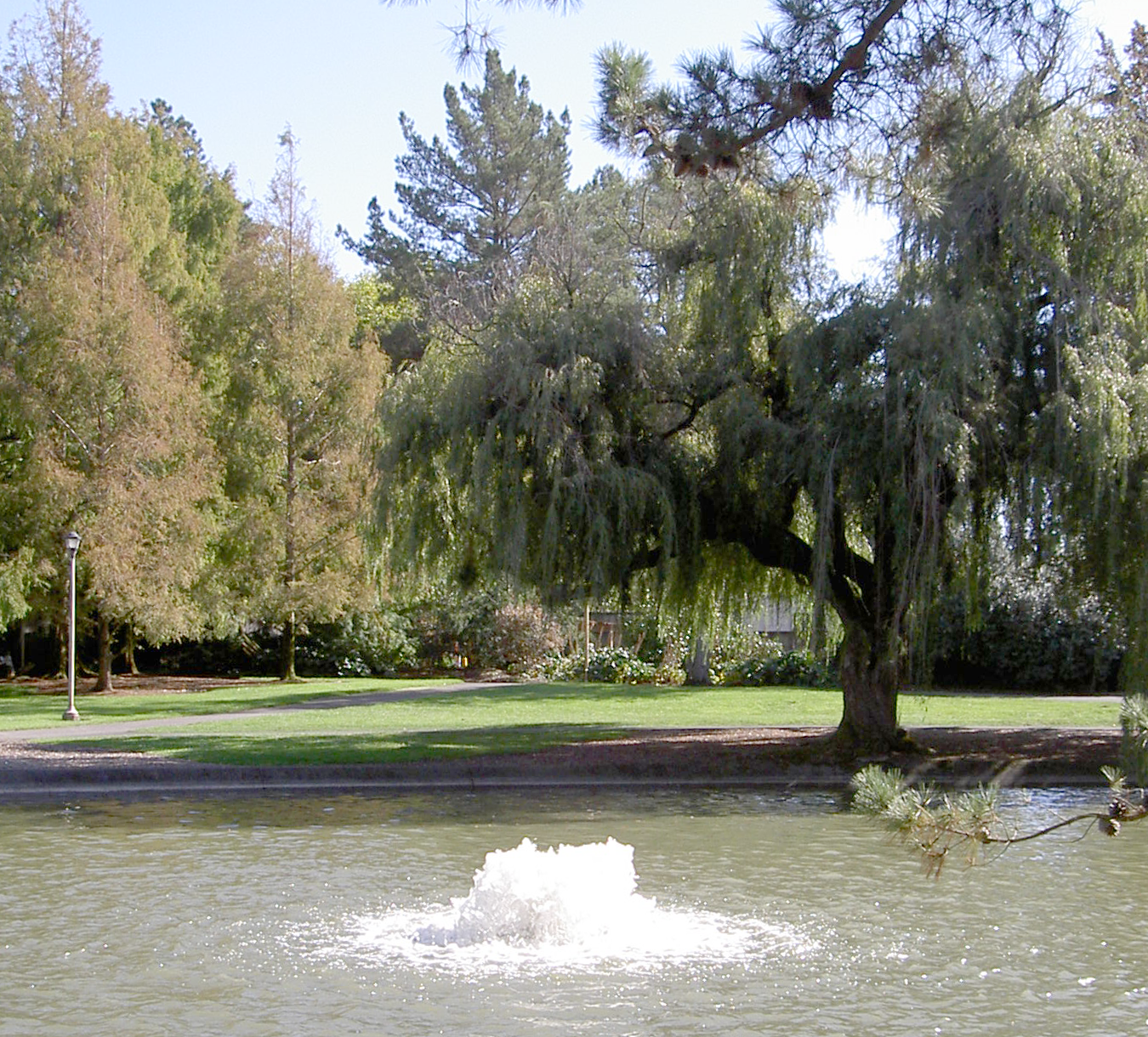
One of the ponds behind the Commons

In 1969, the first master's degrees in biology and psychology were offered. The new cluster school concept, coupled with a more intense focus on the surrounding rural environment, influenced the new physical master plan. The first facility built under the new plan was the Zinfandel residence area. The new Student Health Center used a primarily redwood façade with a landscaped ground cover of wild roses and poppies. Sonoma State was closed from May 7–11, 1970, after Governor Ronald Reagan ordered that all California colleges and universities shut down due to anti-war protests and rallies after the shootings of four students at Kent State University.

Early development of the modern campus came to a close in 1976 when the Student Union was constructed between the main quad and the lakes. This building continued the use of the physical master plan, using primarily redwood and preceded the similarly built Carson Hall, an art building, a childcare center, additional parking, and a computer center which was added onto the library.

=== Modern university ===
In 1978, Sonoma State College became Sonoma State University when the school officially gained university status, after which the surrounding community provided funds for the new university to build a large swimming pool, completed in 1982, and the 500-seat Evert Person Theatre in 1989. Further enrollment increases and a new goal of movement toward a residential campus as opposed to a commuter campus facilitated the building of Verdot Village in 1995.

=== 21st-century expansion ===
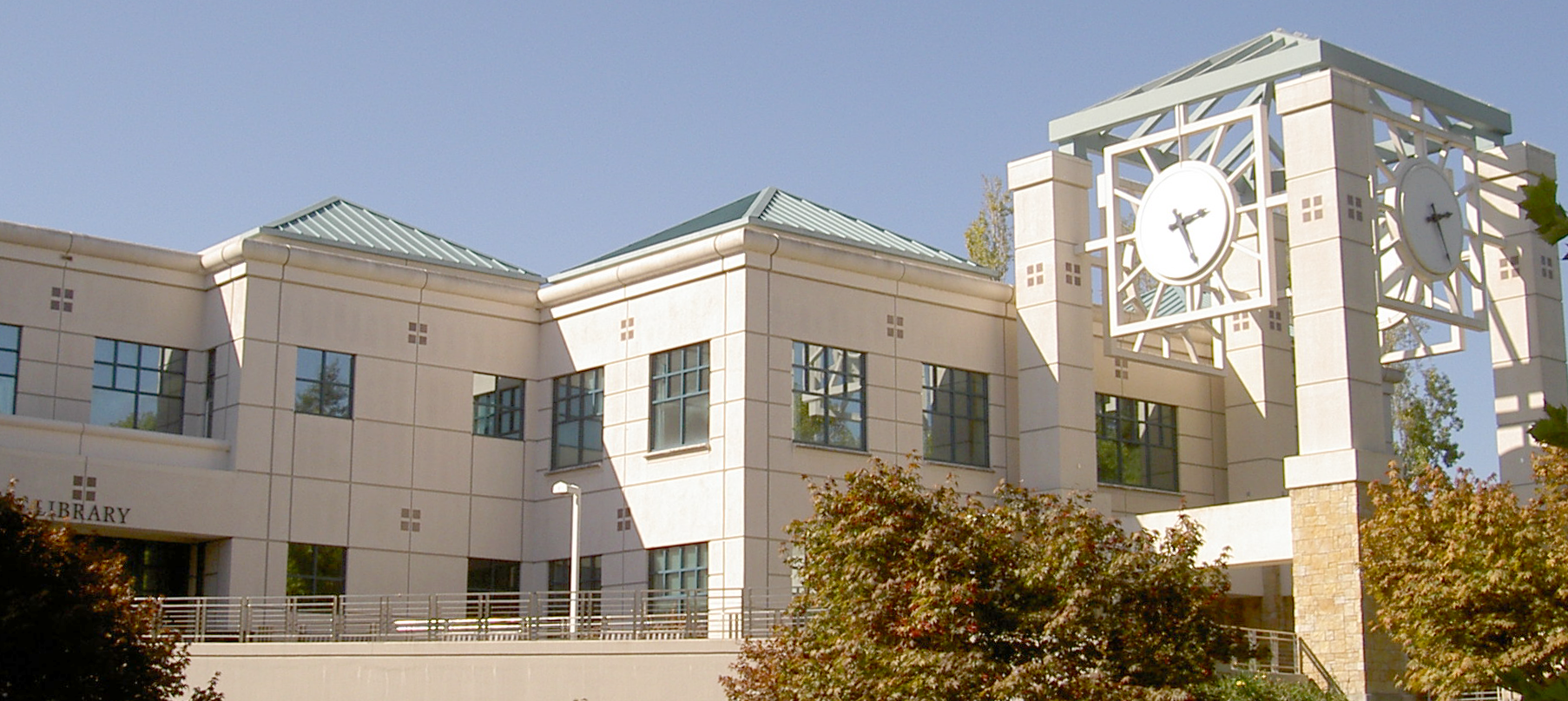
The Jean and Charles Schulz Information Center

In May 2001, the board of trustees approved a new master plan, which added 48 acres (19 ha) to the campus, located north of Copeland Creek. Rapidly accelerated growth of the residential student body was alleviated by the construction of the third phase of on-campus housing named Sauvignon Village, offering housing to non-freshman students. In the same year, the Jean and Charles Schulz Information Center was completed to accommodate the expanded needs of the library and computing services. The facility was built as a prototype library and information complex for the 21st century, housing more than 400,000 volumes in its stacks. The center also houses an advanced Automated Retrieval System (ARS) which contains an additional 750,000 volumes in a computer-managed shelving system in the library wing.

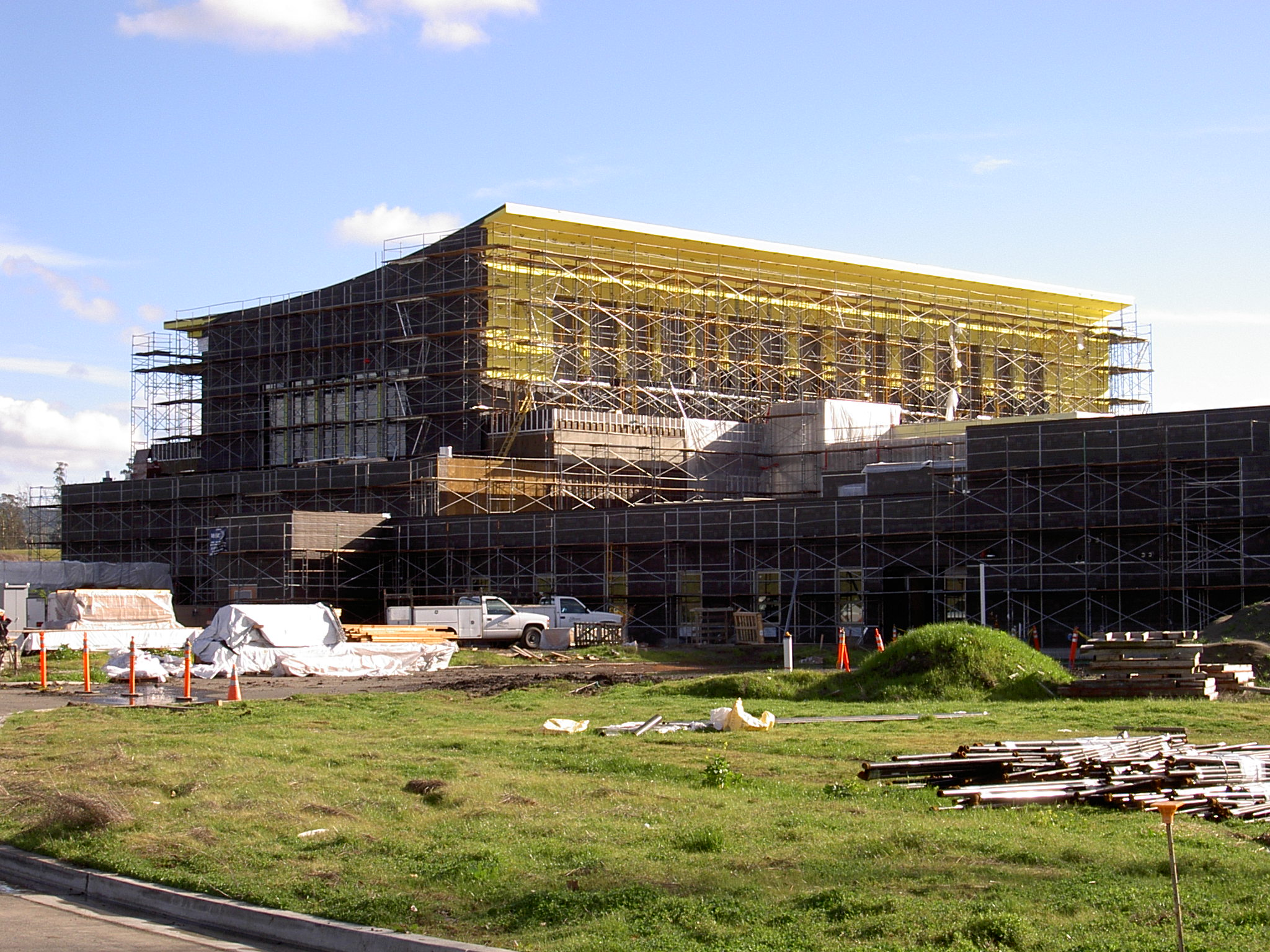
The Green Music Center under construction in 2008

A large portion of the funding to build the information center was donated by Charles Schulz, cartoonist and author of the popular Peanuts comic series, and his wife Jean.

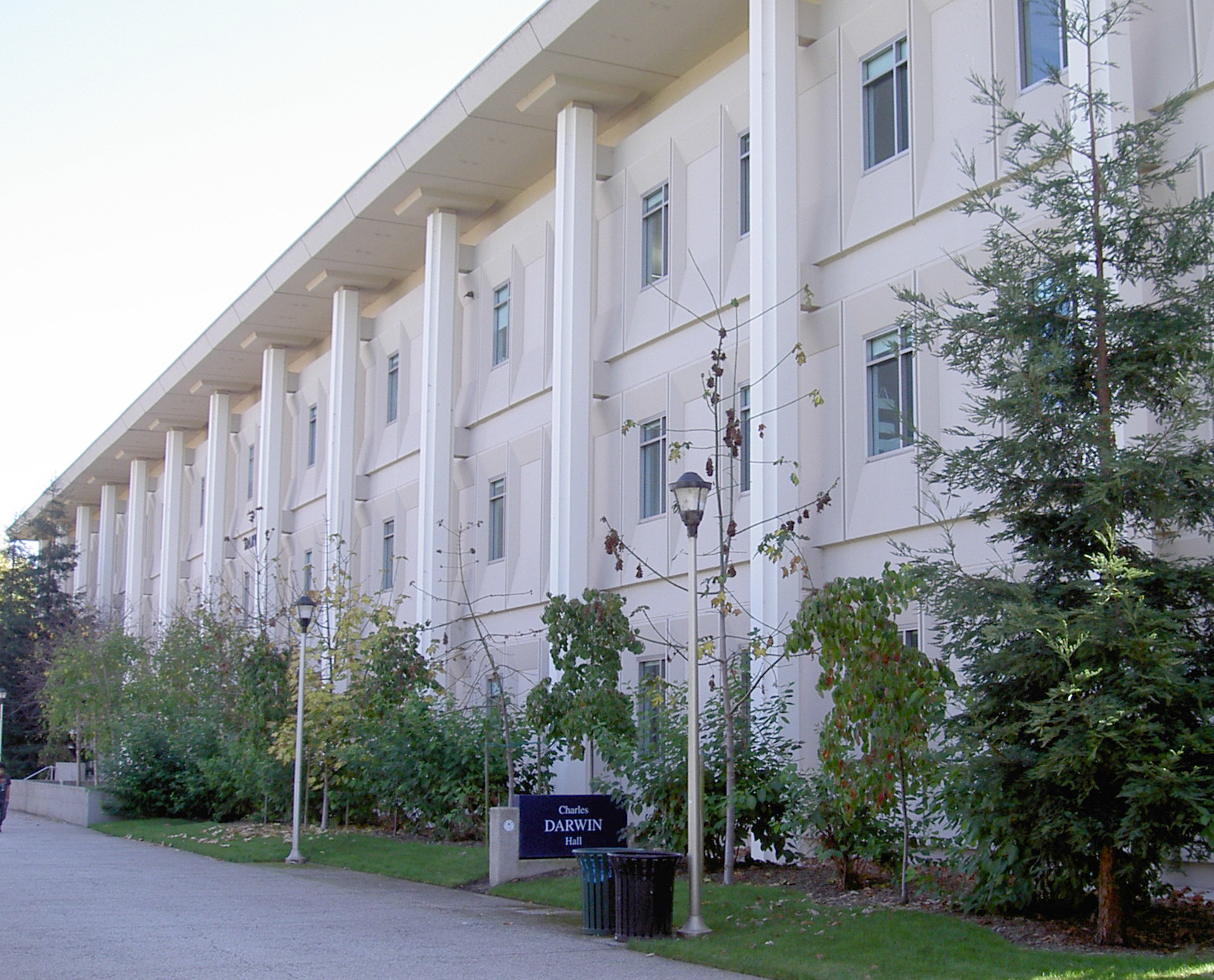
Darwin Hall after its renovation

In January 2005, the university began the renovation of Darwin Hall, the university's science building, which had been built in 1967. The new building was designed to provide efficient academic classrooms and study areas for faculty and their students. The renovated structure was completed and re-opened in fall 2006 and provided new laboratories and classrooms to support the needs of a modern science curriculum.

The new property approved by the board of trustees in 2000 is also the site of the Donald and Maureen Green Music Center, funded by private donors. A component of the Green Music Center, Music Education Hall, was state-funded. The center contains the 1,400-seat Joan and Sanford I. Weill Hall, which was completed in 2012. Its resident orchestra is the Santa Rosa Symphony.

In May 2007, SSU faculty voted no confidence in President Armiñana based upon financial issues surrounding the building of the Green Music Center and faculty allegations that the building of the center took money away from academic programs. The center, originally intended to be a US$10 million project, grew into a $120 million complex as additional venues and features were added to the original plan. The construction of the center was initially funded by bond measures, loans, and private donations as the use of academic funds for other uses is illegal. The board of trustees continued to support Armiñana despite the vote.

In February 2010, the FBI and investigators from the Sonoma County District Attorney's offices raided the campus's administrative and finance offices seizing dozens of boxes from a storage area, and examined computers. The operation focused on an alleged misuse of federal grant money by the California Institute for Human Services (CIHS), a unit closed by SSU in 2007. The two top CIHS administrators were dismissed at that time.

A new social center for the university gained approval in April 2011. Students voted to raise their fees by $150 a semester to cover the cost of the $65 million facility.

In early 2025, after several years of declining enrollment and increasing costs, the university's leaders announced that the university was facing a $24 million deficit. To address the deficit, they announced plans to eliminate numerous positions on campus and let go of employees, including 46 tenured and adjunct faculty members. They also plan to eliminate about two dozen academic programs and six academic departments.

=== Presidents ===
The Office of the President began with the university's founding in 1960 when Ambrose R. Nichols Jr. became the founding president of the university.

In May 2023, the California State University Board of Trustees appointed Ming-Tung "Mike" Lee as Sonoma State's president. In May 2024, Lee was placed on administrative leave, following an unauthorized agreement he had made with campus protestors, and he retired the next day. Emily Cutrer was appointed interim president while a national search for a new president was conducted.

The CSU Board of Trustees appointed Michael E. Spagna to be Sonoma State's eleventh president in November 2025; Spagna, who was previously interim president of California State Polytechnic University, Humboldt, assumed the Sonoma State University presidency on Jan. 20, 2026.

| | Name | Term |
|---|---|---|
| 1 | Ambrose R. Nichols Jr. | (1960–1970) |
| 2 | Thomas H. McGrath | (1971–1974) |
| 3 | Marjorie Downing Wagner | (1974–1976) |
| 4 | Peter Diamandopoulos | (1977–1983) |
| 5 | David W. Benson | (1984–1992) |
| 6 | Ruben Armiñana | (1992–2016) |
| 7 | Judy K. Sakaki | (2016–July 31, 2022) |
| 8 | Ming-Tung "Mike" Lee | (May 23, 2023–May 17, 2024) |
| 9 | Nathan Evans (acting) | (May 2024–July 2024) |
| 10 | Emily Cutrer | (August 2024–January 2026) |
| 11 | Michael E. Spagna | (January 2026–present) |

== Campus ==
Sonoma State occupies approximately 269 acres (109 ha) on the east side of the main suburban area of Rohnert Park. Directly adjacent to the main campus is Wolf's Den Plaza, a frequent hangout and eating area for SSU students. As of fall 2018 Sonoma State had the third-largest white enrollment percentage of Americans in the California State University system.

=== University library ===
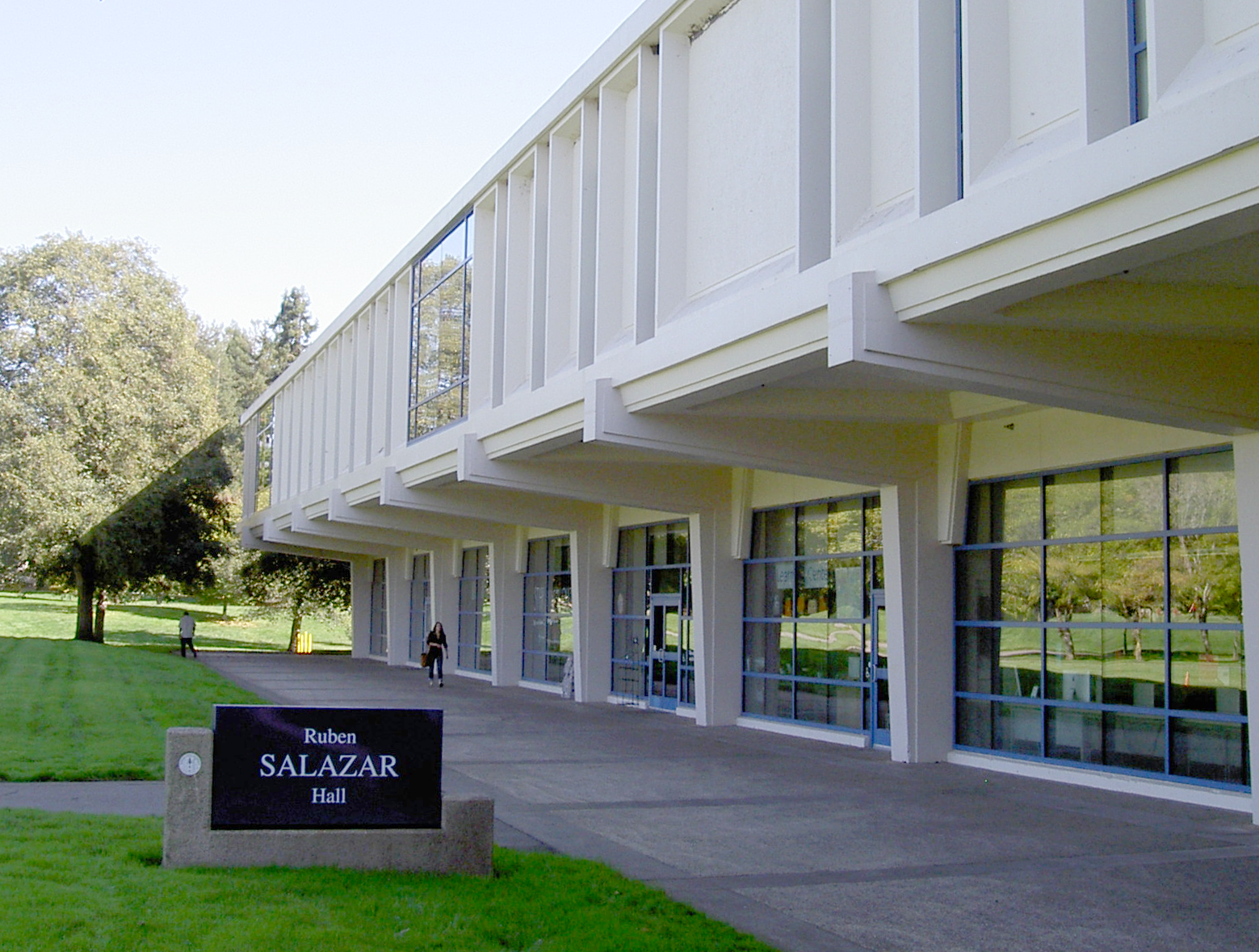
Ruben Salazar Hall, formerly Ruben Salazar Library

The three-story, 215,000-square-foot (20,000 m^{2}) library is separated into two wings housing different areas on each floor. The building has a total of 5 acres (2.0 ha) of indoor floor space and 50,000 feet (15,000 m) of shelving. The library houses a collection of writings and original letters from Jack London, as well as memorabilia relating to his works. The $41.5 million building is named after Charles M. Schulz, the creator of the Peanuts comic cartoon, and his wife Jean, who donated $5 million to help build and furnish the structure.

=== Campus bookstore ===
The Sonoma State Bookstore was operated by Sonoma State Enterprises, Inc. until the spring of 2006 when the operation was outsourced to Barnes & Noble College Booksellers, despite some opposition from faculty members.

=== Off-campus sites ===
In addition to the main campus, the university also owns and operates two off–campus study sites for students of the natural sciences. The first site is the 411-acre (166 ha) Fairfield Osborn Preserve, located on nearby Sonoma Mountain. The second site is the 3,200-acre (1,300 ha) Galbreath Wildlands Preserve in Mendocino County. Both offer opportunities for research and hands-on education to students of the university. Sonoma State also offers students the opportunity to obtain their bachelor's degree in liberal arts partly through classes offered at Napa Valley College and the Vallejo Satellite Campus of Solano Community College.

== Green Music Center ==
Music Education Hall (one of four components of the Green Music Center) opened its doors in 2008 to students taking classes in the two 60-person classrooms. The focal point of the Green Music Center is a 1,400-seat concert hall featuring precision engineered acoustics, named the Joan and Sanford I. Weill Hall. The entire rear wall of the hall opens to lawn seating for a total of 4,000 additional guests. The Hospitality Center, which includes a restaurant/executive conference center, opened in 2010. A $12 million donation from Joan and Sandy Weill, announced in March 2011, provided the funds to complete the concert hall for the fall 2012 opening. The 250-seat Schroeder Recital Hall opened in 2014.

== Academics ==
Undergraduate admission statistics
| | Fall 2025 | Fall 2024 | Fall 2023 | Fall 2022 | Fall 2021 |
|---|---|---|---|---|---|
First-time Freshmen
| Applicants | 10,075 | 11,310 | 10,629 | 10,866 | 10,598 |
| Admits | 9,529 | 10,507 | 9,974 | 10,158 | 9,934 |
| Admit rate | 95% | 93% | 94% | 93% | 94% |
| Enrolled | 424 | 873 | 911 | 967 | 822 |
| Yield rate | 4% | 8% | 9% | 10% | 8% |
Transfers
| Applicants | 3,682 | 3,884 | 3,677 | 4,220 | 4,762 |
| Admits | 3,244 | 3,261 | 2,593 | 3,125 | 3,183 |
| Admit rate | 88% | 84% | 71% | 74% | 67% |
| Enrolled | 672 | 790 | 744 | 736 | 883 |
| Yield rate | 21% | 24% | 29% | 24% | 28% |

Sonoma State University offers 62 bachelor's degree programs, 13 master's degree programs, and 24 teaching credentials.

=== Schools ===
Sonoma State has 19 departments and academic programs divided into three colleges: the College of Education, Counseling, and Ethnic Studies; the College of Humanities, Social Sciences, and the Arts; and the College of Science, Technology, and Business. Each school offers major and minor courses for undergraduate, graduate, and doctorate degrees. Schools and departments include:

- the Department of Early Childhood Studies
- the Hutchins School of Liberal Studies
- the School of Business
- the School of Nursing and Health Sciences

=== Rankings ===
Academic rankings

Master's
- Washington Monthly: 80

Regional
- U.S. News & World Report: 23

National
- Forbes: 168
- WSJ/College Pulse: 501-600

2024–2025 USNWR Best Regional Colleges West Rankings
| Top Public Schools | 14 |
| Top Performers on Social Mobility | 36 |
| Best Undergraduate Engineering Programs | 150 (At schools where doctorate not offered) |
| Nursing | 218 |
| Economics | 277 |

In its 2026 annual ranking of colleges and universities, U.S. News & World Report ranked Sonoma State University 23rd in Regional Universities in the West and 13th in Top Public Schools.

Forbes ranked Sonoma State University 168th out of the top 500 rated private and public colleges and universities in America for the 2024–25 report. Sonoma was also ranked 75th among public colleges and 37th in the west

==== Hutchins School of Liberal Studies ====
The Hutchins School of Liberal Studies is an interdisciplinary learning community within the larger institution of Sonoma State University. HIPPS was under the direction of professor Francisco Vázquez for many years. Mario Savio's final teaching post was in Hutchins. Stephanie Dyer was appointed director.

==== Wine Business Institute ====
Sonoma State's location in the California Wine Country allows the school to offer wine industry focused degrees and professional certifications as part of its Wine Business Institute, founded in 1996. Courses are offered in wine marketing, wine finance and accounting, human resources management, wine business strategies, wine production, operations, and distribution.

=== Associations and accreditations ===
Sonoma State is accredited by the WASC Senior College and University Commission. Several of the schools within Sonoma State also have additional accreditations, such as the School of Business and Economics, which is accredited by the Association to Advance Collegiate Schools of Business. The Mental Health Counseling master's degree program is accredited by the Masters in Psychology and Counseling Accreditation Council (MPCAC). Sonoma State University is the only California school that belongs to the Council of Public Liberal Arts Colleges.

== Art from the Heart ==
Art from the Heart, an annual art auction, has been held at the university since 1984 to raise funds for the art gallery's display, advertising, and lecture program by selling invited artists' work.

== Student life ==
=== Athletics ===
Sonoma State teams competed in intercollegiate athletics as the Sonoma State Seawolves. Sonoma State University was an NCAA Division II member and part of the California Collegiate Athletic Association (CCAA), Western Water Polo Association (WWPA) and the Pacific West Conference (PacWest). Ten of SSU's sports were in the CCAA, water polo was in the WWPA, and men's and women's tennis were in the PacWest.

Sonoma State athletics began in 1964 with the school's first men's basketball team. Through the years, the Seawolves have had various successes including national championships in 1990 (women's soccer), 2002 (men's soccer), and 2009 (men's golf). The school's traditional colors are navy, Columbia, and white. SSU athletic teams participated in the CCAA, an association within the NCAA's Division II. The SSU Athletic Department offered nine NCAA women's sports teams and five men's teams.

In the spring of 2020, it was announced that men's tennis, women's tennis, and women's water polo would be disbanded due to insufficient funding. In January 2025, it was announced that the athletics department would be eliminated due to budget cuts.

In January 2025, Sonoma State announced that they will be disbanding all 11 of the university’s sports due to budget cuts and high maintenance upkeep costs. The 2024-25 college sports season was the last season of Sonoma State athletics. Since then, the university has seen a decline in attendance due to athletes leaving the university because their sports were disbanded.

In July 2026, Sonoma State announced the return of nine of the eleven sports that were disbanded due to budget cuts in 2025. A total of ten sports will return in Fall 2027, including women’s basketball, cross country, golf, soccer, softball, and volleyball, as well as men’s basketball, golf, and soccer. Additionally, men’s cross country will be added for the first time in over a decade to bring the university to the minimum of ten sports required for NCAA Division II eligibility.

- Men's (2)
  - Golf: 2009
  - Soccer: 2002
- Women's (1)
  - Soccer: 1990

=== Housing ===
Sonoma State provides suite, apartment, and townhouse style housing. There are six villages on campus, named after wines: Cabernet, Zinfandel, Verdot, Sauvignon, Beaujolais, and Tuscany. There are two swimming pools and spas. Sonoma State's dorms are ranked #25 in the nation as of 2015, according to Niche Rankings.

=== Student organizations ===
Sonoma State University has more than 100 chartered student organizations, including fraternities and sororities, and more than 20 sports clubs. Several teams, run by students, compete regionally and in national tournaments.

==== Student government ====
Associated Students (AS) is a student organization. The AS Senate is the student government and board of directors of the corporation. AS also encompasses two smaller divisions, Associated Students Productions (ASP), which plans and produces on-campus concerts and student events, and Join Us Making Progress (JUMP), which organizes community service programs.

== Notable alumni ==
| Name | Known for | Relationship to Sonoma |
|---|---|---|
| Scott Alexander | Major League Baseball pitcher for the Colorado Rockies | Played his junior year of college for the SSU baseball team. |
| Larry Allen | Professional football player. Super Bowl champion and Hall of Fame player for the Dallas Cowboys. | Played on now defunct football team. Inducted into the SSU Athletics Hall of Fame in 2001. |
| Daniel Barone | Professional baseball player drafted by the Marlins in the 2004 Major League Baseball Draft. | Played for SSU Baseball team. |
| Freddie Bradley | Professional football player | Played on the now defunct football team. |
| Marshall Brant | Professional baseball player who played for the New York Mets | SSU baseball player. Inducted into the SSU Athletics Hall of Fame in 1998 |
| Kate Braverman | Novelist, short-story writer, and poet. | M.A. English |
| David V. Brewer | Associate Justice of the Oregon Supreme Court. Retired in 2017. | Bachelor of Arts, Economics ('74) |
| Cheryl Chase | American intersex activist and the founder of the Intersex Society of North America | M.A. Organization Development |
| Abdul Rahman Dahlan | Member of the Parliament of Malaysia | BA Economics & Management |
| Kevin Danaher | Author and activist, co-founder of Global Exchange | BA Sociology |
| William C. Davis | Civil War historian | Bachelor of Arts, Master of Arts ('69) |
| O'Koyea Dickson | Professional baseball player. Drafted by the Los Angeles Dodgers in the 12th round of the 2011 MLB draft. | Played for SSU baseball team. |
| Tommy Everidge | Hitting coach for the Oakland Athletics | Played for SSU baseball team. |
| Michael Fellows | Noted computer science researcher | BA Mathematics |
| James Ishmael Ford | American Zen Buddhist priest and a retired Unitarian Universalist minister. | BA Psychology |
| Crystal Galindo | Visual artist | BFA, 2013 |
| Samantha Ginn | Actress and stage director | Drama major |
| Justin Gross | Voice over actor | BA Criminal Justice Administration |
| Sam Hernandez | Professional football player | Played on now defunct football team |
| Mike Horner | Adult film actor | BA Philosophy, 1980 |
| George Ledin | Teaching how to program malware | Computer science faculty |
| Fehlandt Lentini | Professional Baseball player | Played for baseball team. Inducted into the SSU Athletics Hall of Fame in 2010 |
| Laurie MacDonald | Film producer. Filmography includes: Men in Black, The Ring, Sweeney Todd, and Flight | B.A. English (76) |
| Molly Murphy MacGregor | Educator and co-founder of the National Women's History Alliance | Attended graduate school |
| Andrew McGuire | Public health advocate, documentary filmmaker, MacArthur Fellow | BA History, English, 1971 |
| Mike McGuire | Majority Leader of the California State Senate | BA Political Science, 2002 |
| Carole Migden | Former California State Senator | M.A. |
| Tendai Mukomberanwa | Soapstone sculptor | Bachelor of Fine Arts |
| Len A. Pennacchio | Molecular biologist | B.A. Biology |
| D. A. Powell | Poet | 1991 graduate |
| Claire Porter | Choreographer | Attended from 1969 to 1973 |
| Jon Provost | Actor, played Timmy Martin in the CBS series Lassie | Alumni |
| Ulf-Dietrich Reips | Pioneer of Internet-based research, Professor of Psychology | MA Psychology, 1992 |
| Jason Robinson | American jazz saxophonist, electronic musician, and composer | Jazz Studies and Philosophy |
| Nancy Silverton | Chef, baker, and author | Non-degreed alumnus |
| Dave Smeds | Science fiction author and Nebula Award finalist for Best Short Story in 1996 | B.A. English and Psychology, 1980 |
| Virginia Strom-Martin | Former California State Assemblywoman | B.A., M.A. 1976 |
| Elliot Werk | Former Idaho State Senator | BS Geology |
| Jeanne Woodford | Executive Director of Death Penalty Focus. Previously, she served as the Undersecretary and Director of the California Department of Corrections and Rehabilitation (CDCR) and Warden of San Quentin State Prison | B.A. Criminal Justice, 1978 |
| Steven Zaillian | Screenwriter, film producer, director | Non-degreed |
| Chris Rogers | Member of the California State Assembly | B.A., Political Science |

== Notable faculty ==
| Name | Known for | Relationship to Sonoma |
|---|---|---|
| Carl Peterson | Kansas City Chiefs Former president & general manager | Football coach |
| Carolyn Saarni | Counseling psychologist, expert on development of emotional competence | Faculty |
| Alexa Sand | Art historian | Faculty |
| Greg Sarris | Author and Native American leader | Faculty |
| Mario Savio | Civil liberties activist | Faculty |

.
