= List of awards and honors received by George McGovern =

During his lifetime, George McGovern received many awards and honors.

== Military ==
During his service with the United States Army Air Forces during World War II, McGovern was awarded the Distinguished Flying Cross and the Air Medal with three oak leaf clusters.

== Honorary degrees ==
Combined, George and Eleanor McGovern received more than 20 honorary degrees. These include these from George.

In 1967, McGovern received an honorary LL.D. from Grinnell College.

McGovern received an honorary degree in humane letters in June 1969 from Northwestern University.

In 1984, McGovern received a doctor of laws honorary degree from George Washington University.

In 1990, McGovern was awarded an honorary J.D. degree from the University of Houston Law Center.

In 2001, McGovern received an honorary degree from UMDNJ for his accomplishments in fighting world hunger.

Also in 2001, McGovern received an honorary D.P.S. from Tufts University.

In 2004, McGovern was given an honorary degree by the University of San Francisco.

In May 2008, McGovern received an honorary doctor of public service degree at the University of South Dakota, in recognition of his public service to the citizens of South Dakota and the nation.

That month the same, McGovern received an honorary degree from Drury University in Springfield, Missouri, and gave the commencement speech.

On September 4, 2005, he appeared at the Houston Astrodome in support of the survivors of Hurricane Katrina. This time, another Houston university, Rice University, awarded him an honorary Ph.D.

== Awards and ceremonies ==
In 1991, McGovern was made a Gandhi Peace Award laureate.

During 1999, McGovern received the Freedom from Want award, part of the Four Freedoms Awards from the Roosevelt Institute.

On August 9, 2000, McGovern was presented with the Presidential Medal of Freedom by President Bill Clinton. It is the United States' highest civilian honor.

In 2002, McGovern and fellow former Senator Bob Dole were the inaugural winners of the McGovern–Dole Leadership Award given out by the World Food Programme. The award has been given out in each year since "to recognize leaders who have played a critical role in the fight against global hunger."

On March 22, 2006, McGovern spoke at the University of Virginia's Miller Center of Public Affairs on the topic of world hunger.

On October 5–7, 2006, the George and Eleanor McGovern Library and Center for Leadership and Public Service was dedicated at Dakota Wesleyan University. Among the dedication's dignitaries were former President Bill Clinton and Allen Neuharth.

On July 10, 2007, "An Evening with George McGovern" was held at Dakota Wesleyan University, to celebrate McGovern's upcoming 85th birthday. The event was anchored by veteran NBC correspondent Sander Vanocur.

On July 13–14, 2007, a series of events was held in Washington, D.C. to honor McGovern on the 35th anniversary of his nomination for president, and shortly before his 85th birthday on July 19. It included a reunion of his 1972 campaign staff and volunteers at the House Caucus Room, a World Hunger Symposium at George Washington University, followed by a birthday tribute luncheon. The events were co-sponsored by Friends of the World Food Program and Dakota Wesleyan University's George and Eleanor McGovern Center for Leadership and Public Service. Hundreds of former staff, volunteers, supporters and friends attended, along with public officials. McGovern addressed the crowds at all three events. Other speakers included House Speaker Nancy Pelosi, Gary Hart, Congressman Jim McGovern, journalists Bob Woodward, Carl Bernstein and David Broder, and Friends of the World Food Program President/CEO Karen Sendelback. Over $100,000 was raised for the McGovern Legacy Fund, which supports the McGovern-Dole Food Program and Dakota Wesleyan's McGovern Center. The events received national news coverage and were broadcast in part on C-SPAN on August 4 and 6. (Their timing and coverage was serendipitous as McGovern was already in the news that week, responding to journalists about a newly released White House tape disclosing Nixon's controversial remarks about him on election night 1972.)

Those events were followed by another anniversary event on November 6, 2007, "The '72 Campaign: A Living Legacy", at the 2007 McGovern Conference, sponsored by the McGovern Center at Dakota Wesleyan University. It featured presentations by scholarly authors, former McGovern campaign staffers and volunteers, and McGovern himself.

In 2007, Death Penalty Focus awarded McGovern with their Human Rights Award.

On October 16, 2008, McGovern and Dole were named the 2008 World Food Prize Laureates for their work to promote school-feeding programs globally.

On March 12, 2009, McGovern and Dole received a National Peacemaker Award from the National Conflict Resolution Center for "crossing party lines to break the cycle of poverty and violence for children around the world" through their work in fighting world hunger.

In 2005, McGovern and Dole were given the Gene White Lifetime Achievement Award for Child Nutrition from the Global Child Nutrition Foundation. Other recipients include Howard G. Buffett and Catherine Bertini.

On April 6, 2009, Flagler College in St. Augustine, Florida celebrated "An Evening with George McGovern."

McGovern's 90th birthday was celebrated on July 19, 2012, in Washington affair hosted by World Food Program USA. Guests included liberal Democratic stalwarts such as Nancy Pelosi, Barney Frank, Steny Hoyer, Dick Durbin, Victoria Reggie Kennedy, Mark Kennedy Shriver, and Tom Harkin, as well as a fellow South Dakotan, Republican John Thune, who said, "We’re very proud of Senator McGovern. My dad was a big McGovern fan ... he’s a terrific man and a great public servant."

== Things named after him ==
In addition to the McGovern Library and Center at Dakota Wesleyan, a middle school in Sioux Falls is named for him,
