= Ruben Armiñana =

Cuban political scientist (born 1947)

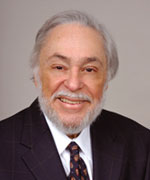

6th President of Sonoma State University
- In office 1992–2016
- Preceded by: David W. Benson
- Succeeded by: Judy K. Sakaki

Personal details
- Born: May 15, 1947 (age 79) Cuba
- Education: Hill College (Associate degree); University of Texas at Austin (B.A., M.A.)

Ruben Armiñana (born May 15, 1947) is a political scientist who served as the sixth president of Sonoma State University from 1992 to 2016. He is the first Cuban-American to head a campus in the California State University system.

== Early life ==
Ruben Armiñana was born in Cuba. His father was a professor and his mother was a librarian. In 1961 he fled Cuba and settled in Hillsboro, Texas, with an aunt and uncle. As he describes it, he arrived as a refugee "with a change of underwear and a dime in my pocket." He earned an A.A. degree in economics and political science from Hill College and a B.A. degree in economics, political science and Spanish and an M.A. degree in Latin American economics and political science from the University of Texas at Austin.

== Education and career in New Orleans ==
Armiñana moved to New Orleans in 1969, and worked for three years as director of operations and training for the Inter-American Center at Loyola University New Orleans. From 1972 to 1978 he worked as administrative analyst and organizational development and training consultant for the City of New Orleans. He also worked as a part-time news anchor and reporter at WWL-TV from 1973 to 1981, and continued as a television news consultant through 1988 for the only daily Spanish-language news program on Louisiana television. He earned a Ph.D. in political science from the University of New Orleans in 1983.

At Tulane University he served as executive assistant to the senior vice president for operations from 1983 to 1985, director of the Institute for the Study of Change in the Americas from 1985 to 1988, and vice president/assistant to the president from 1985 to 1988. He also held a faculty appointment in international business and political science.

He worked in the private sector from 1978 to 1983 as vice president of Commerce International Corp., a New Orleans–based international trading company.

== Career in the California State University ==
In 1988 Armiñana moved to California to serve as vice president for finance and development at California State Polytechnic University, Pomona from 1988 to 1992, where he held a faculty appointment in political science.

Armiñana was appointed the sixth president of Sonoma State University in July 1992. He is a professor of political science and teaches periodically. During his term of office, the university has constructed the US$45 million Jean and Charles Schulz Information Center (helped by a $5 million gift from Peanuts cartoonist Charles M. Schulz), completed a $29.5 million renovation of the Darwin Hall science building, built a $15 million student recreation center, added residence hall units that now house a total of 2,400 students on campus, completed the Environmental Technology Center that models "green building" techniques, and began construction on the $120 million Donald and Maureen Green Music Center complex (initiated by a $10 million gift from telecommunications entrepreneur Donald Green), the centerpiece of which is the Joan and Sanford I. Weill Hall modeled after Ozawa Hall at Tanglewood. In addition, the university acquired the 411-acre (1.66 km^{2}) Fairfield Osborn Preserve in 1997 from the Nature Conservancy, and the 3,500-acre (14 km^{2}) Galbreath Wildlands Preserve in 2004.

Academic programs initiated during Armiñana's presidency include B.S. and M.S. degrees in Engineering Science, a wine business concentration for B.A. and M.B.A. degrees, and a highly successful Osher Lifelong Learning Institute. Sonoma State University was accepted as the California member of the Council of Public Liberal Arts Colleges (COPLAC).

In 2005 Armiñana was named to the list of the "100 Most Influential Hispanics" by Hispanic Business Magazine.

In May 2007 the faculty of Sonoma State University voted no-confidence in President Armiñana, alleging that he underfunded the academic budget and made decisions without consulting the faculty. Faculty charged the spiraling cost of the Green Music Center was taking money from academic programs. The Green Music Center was first proposed as a small choral hall. But after Armiñana visited the famed Tanglewood concert hall in Massachusetts in 1996, he was inspired to think on a larger scale. The hall went from a $10 million idea presented to Green to a $22 million proposal for the larger concert hall in 1998. Eventually the initial $22 million price tag ballooned to an estimated $145 million. The project included four components—the 1,400-seat concert hall, a smaller recital hall, a hospitality center with meeting rooms and a restaurant, and a music education building that was planned to house the arts programs and accommodate community groups. At one point about $55 million had been raised through private donations, including a $12 million donation from Joan and Sandy Weill, announced in March 2011, that provided the funds to complete the Joan and Sanford I. Weill Hall for the fall 2012 opening. Another $18.1 million came from state construction bonds and $25 million from the state capital program for the music faculty offices and instructional equipment in the academic building. The campus planned to use taxpayer funds to cover the $934,054 it is estimated to cost each year to operate the center. The 250-seat Schroeder's Recital Hall was completed in 2014. Throughout the controversies the CSU Board of Trustees continued to support Armiñana. In August 2015 Armiñana announced he would retire at the end of June 2016.
