= Marcus Johnson Jr. =

American basketball player

No. 0 – Alvik Basket
- Position: Point guard
- League: Superettan

Personal information
- Born: May 18, 1995 (age 31)
- Listed height: 5 ft 11 in (1.80 m)
- Listed weight: 180 lb (82 kg)

Career information
- High school: Evelyn Mack Academy (Charlotte, North Carolina)
- College: Mott CC (2013–2014); Hill College (2014–2015); Little Rock (2015–2017)
- NBA draft: 2017: undrafted
- Playing career: 2017–present

Career history
- 2017–2019: Al Wakrah
- 2019–present: Alvik Basket

Career highlights
- Qatari League Player of the Year (2018); All-Qatari League First Team (2018); Second-team All-Sun Belt (2016)

Marcus Johnson Jr. (born May 18, 1995) is an American professional basketball player for Alvik Basket. He played college basketball for the Arkansas–Little Rock Trojans.

== High school career ==
He played high school basketball at Evelyn Mack Academy in Charlotte, North Carolina. Johnson was one of six players at Evelyn Mack to sign with Mott Community College.

== College career ==
In his first season at Mott, Johnson made an immediate impact, averaging 14.6 points and 4.2 assists per game under coach Steve Schmidt. He left Mott for academic reasons to play at Hill College. He was named MVP in the Northern Texas Junior College Athletic Conference. Johnson averaged 16.9 points, 3.2 rebounds, and 7.8 assists per game at Hill.

Johnson transferred to Arkansas–Little Rock before his junior season. In his second game for the Trojans, Johnson scored 30 points in a 95–49 win over Centenary. He averaged 12.6 points and 3.1 rebounds per game. The Trojans upset Purdue in the NCAA Tournament 85–83 in double overtime, with Johnson contributing 10 points. Johnson was named to the Second Team All-Sun Belt Conference. As a senior, Johnson averaged 13.3 points per game. However, his shooting percentage declined from the previous season as he became the primary point guard due to the graduation of Josh Hagins.

== Professional career ==
=== Qatar League ===
In the 2017–18 season, Johnson played for Al Wakrah of the Qatar league. On December 7, 2017, he scored 32 points in an upset of 17-time champions Al Rayyan. Johnson scored 29 points including seven three-pointers in a 95–86 win over Al Gharafa on December 17. Johnson was named league player and import of the year.

=== Swedish League ===
In 2019, Johnson started playing under for Alvik basket in the Swedish League. On November 24, 2019, Johnson scored 32 points and had five rebounds in a loss to IK Eros. On January 5, 2020, Johnson scored 30 points with 7 rebounds and 4 assists in a win against Bankeryds 68–66. he was named Superettan player of the week. He scored 34 points and had nine rebounds and six assists in a win against Hogsbo, and was again named Player of the Week on January 27.
