= Judy K. Sakaki =

American academic administrator

7th President of Sonoma State University
- In office July 1, 2016 – July 31, 2022
- Preceded by: Ruben Armiñana

Personal details
- Born: Judy Kaoru Sakaki c. 1953 (age 72–73) Oakland, California, U.S.
- Education: California State University, East Bay (BA, MS); University of California, Berkeley (PhD)

Judy K. Sakaki (born c. 1953) is a former American academic administrator, who previously served as the seventh president of Sonoma State University (SSU). She spent most of her previous academic career as a student affairs administrator in the University of California system. She is the first Japanese-American woman to head a four-year college or university in the United States, as well as the first Asian American woman hired as a university president in California and the second woman to serve as president of SSU.

== Early life and education ==
Sakaki's maternal grandparents, her mother and her uncle were held in the Topaz Internment camp in Delta, Utah, during World War II.

Sakaki was born and raised in Oakland, California. A first-generation college student, she earned a Bachelor of Arts degree in human development and Master of Science degree in educational psychology from California State University, East Bay (formally called California State University, Hayward). She then earned a PhD in 1991 in education from University of California, Berkeley.

== Career ==
Before becoming the president of Sonoma State, Sakaki served as vice chancellor of student affairs at University of California, Davis, vice president and dean of student affairs at California State University, Fresno, and vice president for student affairs at the University of California system. In 2009 Sakaki co-chaired a task force to award honorary degrees to approximately 700 Japanese American UC students who were unable to complete their degrees due to their internment during World War II.

Sakaki succeeded Ruben Armiñana, who emphasized capital projects including the $145 million Green Music Center. Sakaki shifted her focus to students and faculty, cancelling plans to construct a 10,000-seat outdoor concert pavilion adjacent to the Green Music Center, estimated to cost $10.6 million, and stating that the money would be better spent on academic programs.

Sakaki is a former American Council on Education fellow, and an executive fellow of the California State University.

In 2018, then Sonoma State provost, Lisa Vollendorf, reported allegations of sexual harassment involving Sakaki's husband, Patrick McCallum, who often volunteered at university events. Vollendorf reported that several university employees alleged that they were sexually harassed by McCallum. Vollendorf further alleged that Sakaki engaged in retaliatory conduct against Vollendorf upon finding out that Vollendorf made such reports. In January 2022, Cal State University paid $600,000 to settle Vollendorf's claims against Sakaki and McCallum. In a statement, Sakaki stated that claims of retaliation were "utterly without basis," and that she was "saddened and surprised" by the sexual harassment allegations against McCallum.

After some Sonoma State faculty voted for a resolution expressing no confidence in her leadership and pressure from state legislators, Sakaki announced her resignation on June 6, 2022.

== Personal life ==
Sakaki is married to Patrick McCallum, a lobbyist for community colleges. On April 18, 2022, amid criticisms of her handling of sexual harassment allegations against her husband, Sakaki announced that she and McCallum were separating.

On October 9, 2017, the home of Sakaki and her husband, Patrick McCallum, was destroyed by the Tubbs Fire. Parts of the SSU university’s art collection had been displayed in the couple's private residence, which was also lost in the Tubbs Fire.
