= Emily Cutrer =

American university president

Emily Fourmy Cutrer is the former president of Texas A&M University–Texarkana (TAMUT) and an American academic and author. Born in San Antonio, she has a BA, MA, and PhD in American Studies from University of Texas at Austin and worked there as faculty. She has also worked at Arizona State University and California State University San Marcos. During her presidency, she has overseen large expansions of the university's programs and partnerships. From August 1, 2024 until January 2026, she served as interim president of Sonoma State University while a national search was conducted.

== Career ==
Beginning in 1986, Cutrer worked as a faculty member of the University of Texas at Austin in American Studies and Art History, and became the associate director of its American Studies program. In 1990, she moved to Arizona State University to work in various administrative roles, lastly as the dean of the university's New College of Interdisciplinary Arts and Sciences beginning in 2001. In 2006, she began work at California State University San Marcos, served as its provost and its vice president for academic affairs. The Board of Regents of the Texas A&M University System appointed her as president of Texas A&M University–Texarkana in 2013.

In 1998, Cutrer was awarded Texas Institute of Letters' Award for Best Book for her historical biography The Art of the Woman: The Life and Work of Elisabet Ney, and she has written several articles and book chapters.

During her time as TAMUT president, TAMUT and Paris Junior College signed a dual admissions agreement, which she and other officials signed in 2015, as well as a matriculation agreement between TAMUT and Northeast Texas Community College's nursing programs in 2013. In 2015, local ophthalmic group Texarkana Eye Associates approached Cutrer about starting an ophthalmic assistant/optician course, which was then offered beginning in 2016 as a professional (not for credit) course. Cutrer has overseen large expansions of the university, including $32 million building construction in 2016, supported by State Representative Gary VanDeaver and Speaker of the Texas House Joe Straus, and a 2019 $3.6 million funding addition for new academicprograms, including support from VanDeaver and State Senator Bryan Hughes.

== Life and education ==
Cutrer was born in San Antonio, Texas, spending her childhood between there and Houston. Her mother was a science teacher. For college, she first attended Hollins University before graduating from the University of Texas at Austin with a Bachelor of Arts in American Studies, later earning a Master of Arts and PhD in the same field.

Cutrer has two children who both also work as educators. Her husband is a Professor Emeritus at Arizona State University. She is on the board of the Texarkana area chapter of United Way of America, while being involved in regional economic and arts organizations and Christus Health.
