= Hill College =

Community college in Hillsboro, Texas, U.S.

Coordinates: 32.32799°N 97.43625°W

- Former names: Hillsboro Junior College, Hill Junior College
- Type: Public community college
- Established: 1921, closed 1950; reopened with different name 1962
- Location: Hillsboro, Texas, United States
- Mascot: Rebels
- Website: www.hillcollege.edu

Hill College is a public community college in Hillsboro, Texas. It opened in 1923.

== History ==
The authorization to establish Hill College was issued in 1921 by the Attorney General of the State of Texas under the name of Hillsboro Junior College. The college first enrolled students in September 1923. At that time there were only two public junior colleges in the state, and Hillsboro Junior College became the first municipal junior college to be chartered in Texas. It was also the first four-year junior college in the country.

Hillsboro Junior College operated continuously until July 1950 when it closed after an attempt to establish a county-wide college system failed. The college lay dormant for eleven years during which time the charter was protected from forfeiture through the efforts of the late Senator Crawford Martin of Hillsboro.

On March 3, 1962, through the efforts of the media, local civic groups, and many others, a bond issue was passed for the purpose of building a new campus. The college opened for business in September 1962 under a new name, Hill Junior College. The new college district was expanded by the voluntary annexation of five Hill County school districts other than the original Hillsboro school district. The district now included Hillsboro, Abbott, Bynum, Covington, Itasca, and Whitney.

In 1974, the college opened an extension center in Cleburne, Texas, located in Johnson County. The Johnson County Campus now includes six buildings on 32 acres of land and has more than 1,000 students enrolled in both day and night classes. In 1997 and 1998, the citizens of Alvarado, Cleburne, Godley, Grandview, Joshua, Keene, Rio Vista, and Venus approved a local maintenance and operation tax for the purpose of supporting the campus of Hill College in Johnson County.

The college dropped “junior” from its name in 1985 and became Hill College.

== Service area ==
The Texas Education Code states that Hill College's service area includes Bosque, Hill, Johnson, and Somervell counties. Additionally, the service area includes land in the following independent school districts: Abbott, Bynum, Covington, Hillsboro, Itasca, and Whitney.

== Texas Heritage Museum ==
The Texas Heritage Museum has three divisions: Galleries & Collection, the Historical Research Center, and the Hill College Press.

=== Texas Heritage Museum Galleries & Collection ===
The historical artifacts within the museum galleries and collections serve as tangible evidence of historical events while the accompanying text provides context to Texas history. Considerable thought and research goes into the galleries before they are displayed, and exhibits will continue to change to present fresh topics and perspectives. Whether in conjunction with classes or standing alone, students and visitors are able to learn Texas history from touring the facilities. The Texas Heritage Museum currently has six major exhibits: an American Civil War gallery entitled “The Blue and Gray Gallery”; a World War II gallery entitled “Texas at War 1939-1945”; “The Vietnam War and Texans’ Involvement”; “The Medal of Honor Memorial to Native-Born Texans”; The Texas Revolution entitled “Revolution & Republic”; and a sixth gallery on weapons from other wars that affect Texas. The museum houses over 16,000 artifacts from the 1830s to the present. The museum averages around 3,000 – 4,000 visitors a year and provides a hands on experience to visitors and students on Texas military history.

In 2009, the 81st Legislature of the State of Texas designated the Texas Medal of Honor Memorial at the Texas Heritage Museum as the official State Memorial to Texas-Born Medal of Honor Recipients. This memorial is to honor 56 native born Texans who received the Medal of Honor. The memorial was designed to enhance the Texas Heritage Museum's mission statement, "To explore Texas and Texans during wartime and how those experiences affect us today." The Memorial's center features two World War II Texas Medal of Honor recipients: Audie Murphy, the most decorated soldier, and Samuel Dealey, the most decorated sailor. The memorial will enhance the Texas Heritage Museum's Medal of Honor collections. The museum has an extensive collection of Audie Murphy's personal artifacts from World War II along with James Harris’ Medal of Honor from World War II. The memorial will also complement an extensive archival collection of photographs and documents of other Texan Medal of Honor recipients in the Historical Research Center.

=== Historical Research Center ===
The HRC has grown in the last 45 years to over 10,000 volumes and is one of the largest collections of books on the Civil War west of the Mississippi River. Included in the HRC is an extensive collection of maps, photographic collections, microfilm, and an archival depository that contains numerous files of soldiers’ letters, diaries, and unpublished manuscripts from all wars. Also featured in the HRC are original art, art prints, and sculptures depicting the Civil War, and personal items belonging to Hill College graduate Bob Bullock during his term as Lieutenant Governor of Texas.

=== Hill College Press ===
The Hill College Press, established in 1964, publishes works of original and interpretative history that complement both the mission of the THM and the geographical setting of Central and North Texas. To date, the press has published thirty-nine full-length books and six monographs. The press publishes at least one book per year on one of the following subjects: Texas and Texans in conflict and war; social, multicultural, and historical subjects of importance to North and Central Texas; biographies of prominent Texans; and anthologies and documentary collections from the Historical Research Center. It also provides support with exhibits and programming development through tracts or pamphlets.

== Academics ==
Hill College offers the Associate in Arts, Associate in Applied Science and certificates.

== Notable alumni ==
- Ruben Armiñana, political scientist and president of Sonoma State University
- Bob Bullock, 38th Lieutenant Governor of Texas
- Dana Eveland, baseball player
- Crawford Martin, Texas politician
- Trevor Stephan, baseball player
- Tim Tadlock, head coach of the Texas Tech Red Raiders baseball team
- Marcus Johnson Jr., basketball player
- Jemerrio Jones, basketball player for the Los Angeles Lakers

== Hill College gallery ==
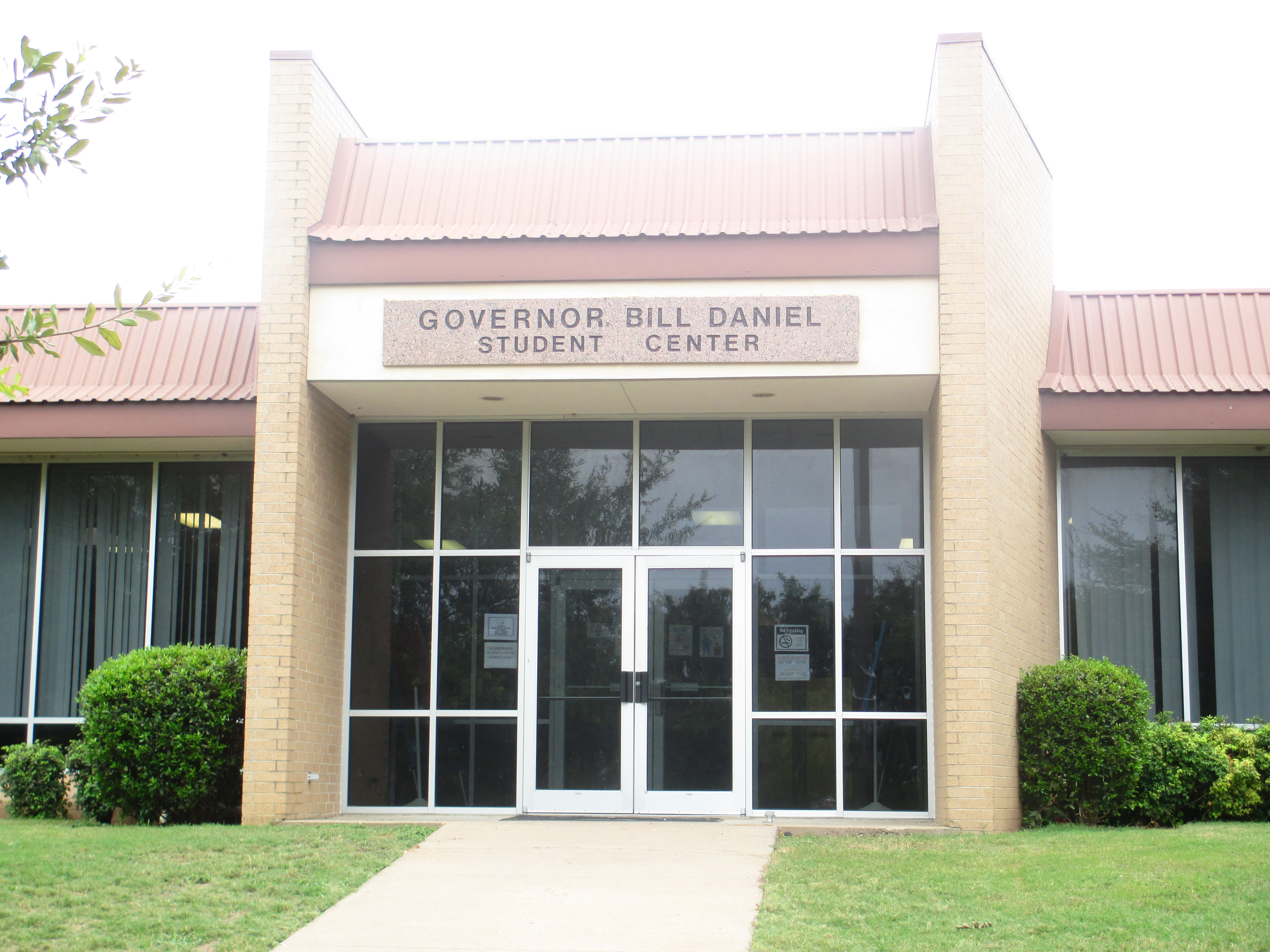
Student center, named for Representative Bill Daniel

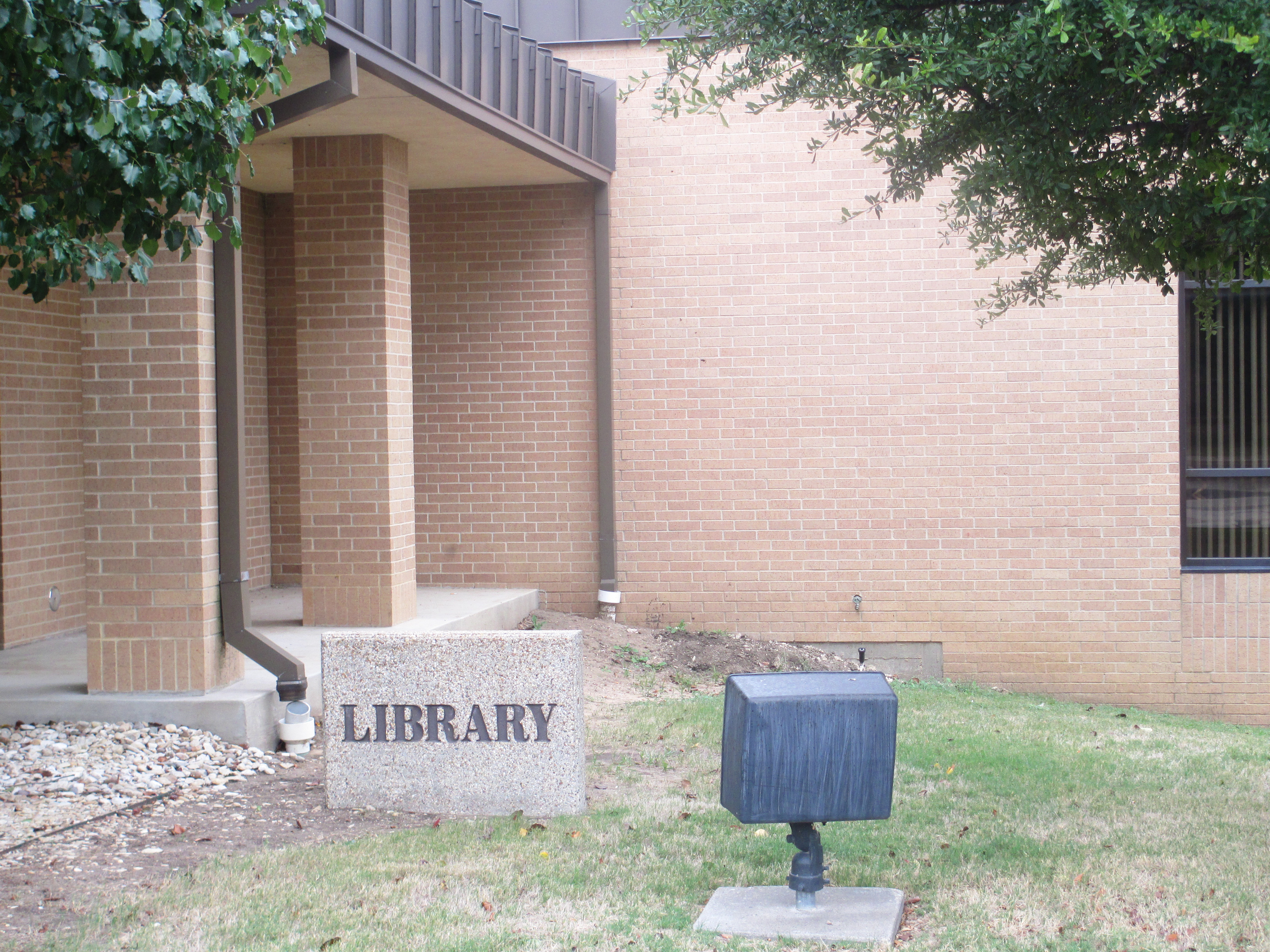
W.R. Auvenshine Library

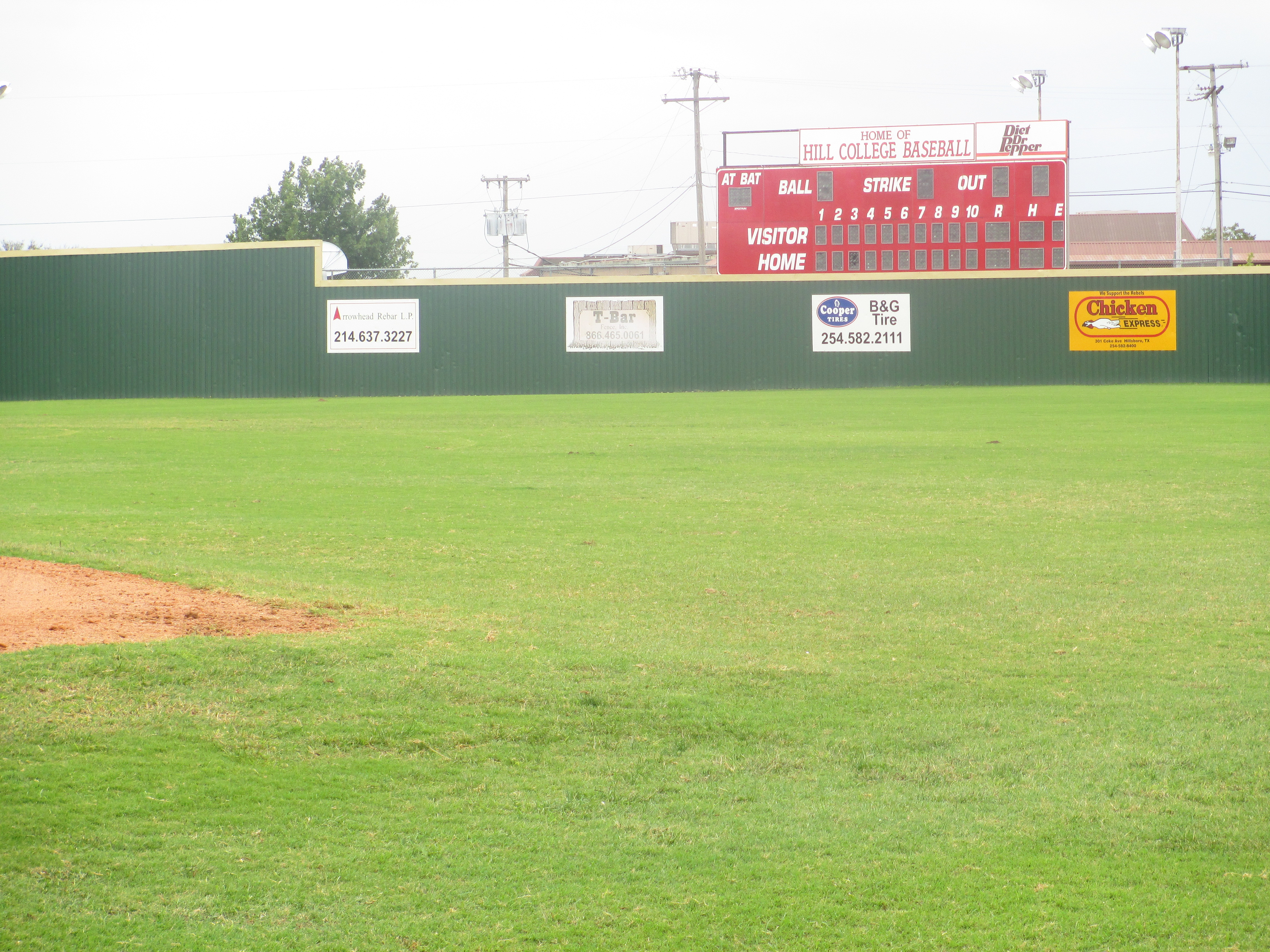
Baseball field

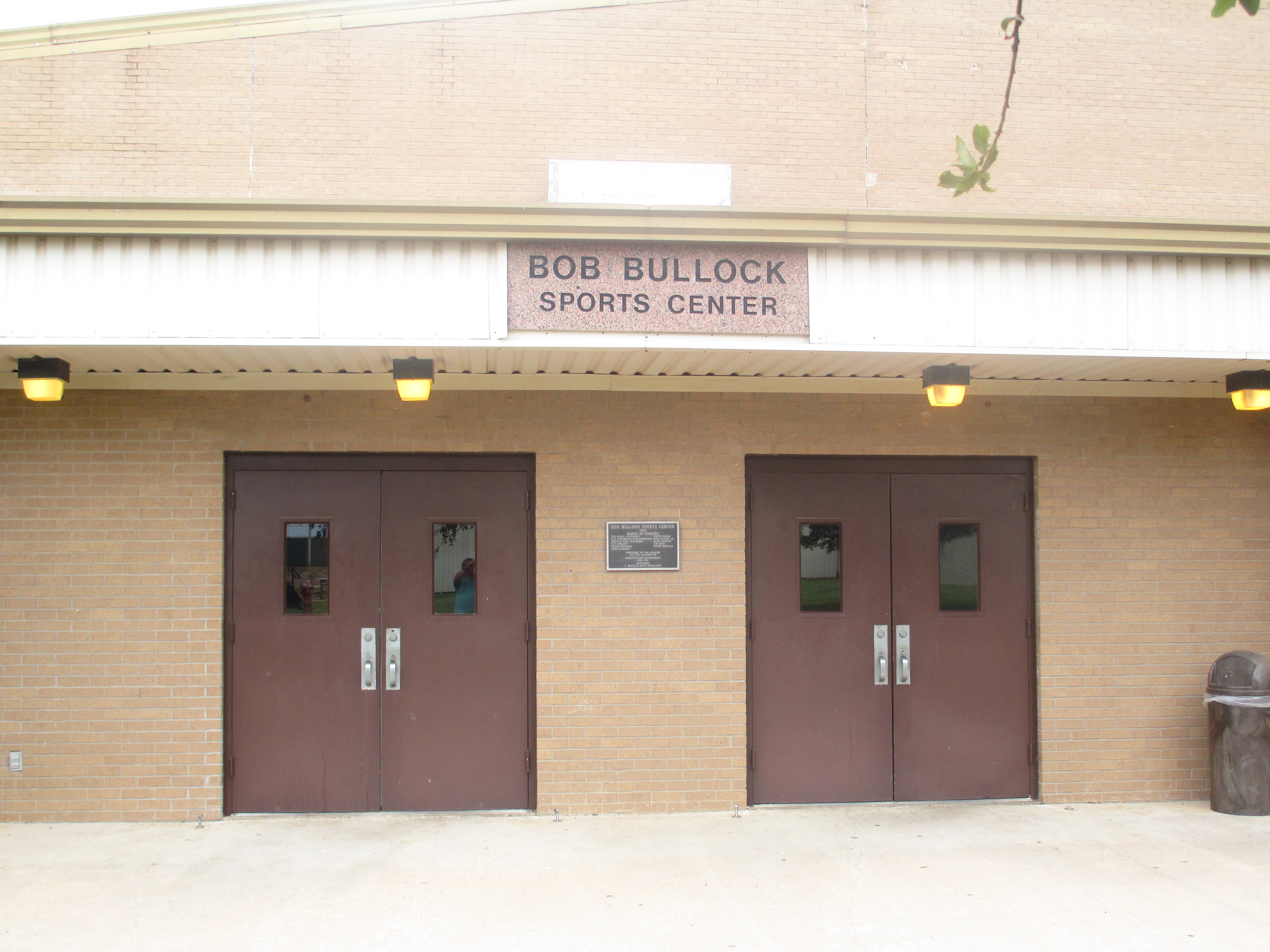
Sports center, named for Lieutenant Governor Bob Bullock

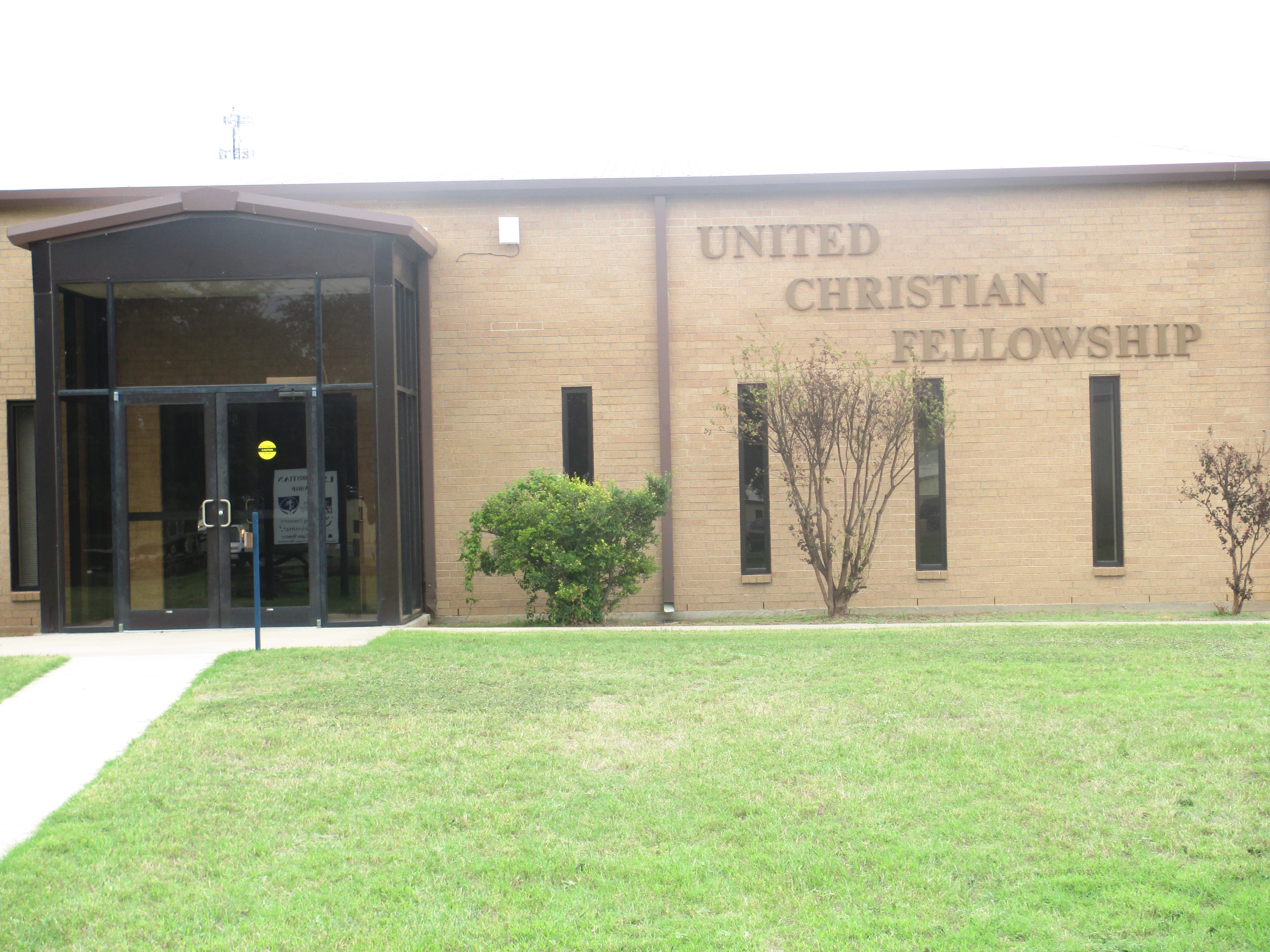
United Christian Fellowship

== Athletics ==
Hill College participates in the North Texas Junior College Athletic Conference (NTJCAC), which is a member of NJCAA Region V. Hill College participates in baseball, men's and women's basketball, men's and women's soccer, softball, volleyball and rodeo. The rodeo team participates as a member of the National Intercollegiate Rodeo Association (NIRA). The rodeo program has eight national titles (seven in bull riding, one in calf roping), which is tied for the most in college rodeo history (Sul Ross State University). The baseball program has had 39 players drafted in the MLB Amateur Draft.
