= Jeanne Woodford =

American prison warden

Jeanne Woodford is an American prison warden, who served as the Undersecretary and Director of the California Department of Corrections and Rehabilitation (CDCR). She is most known as the Warden of San Quentin State Prison from 1999 to 2004, where she oversaw four executions.

== Career ==
Ms. Woodford began her career as a California correctional officer in 1978 at San Quentin State Prisonfollowing her graduation from Sonoma State University. She was appointed Warden of San Quentin State Prison by Governor Davis in 1999. She developed and implemented programs for prisoners including The Success Dorm, the first reentry program in a California prison. This program was designed to prepare inmates for return to their communities by linking community resources with the individual prior to their parole. She also served as Chief Deputy Warden and Associate Warden at San Quentin State Prison. The New York Times profiled Woodford for her unorthodox approach as warden of San Quentin.

In 2004, Woodford was appointed by Governor Arnold Schwarzenegger as the Undersecretary of the California Department of Corrections and Rehabilitation. In 2006 Ms. Woodford retired from the California Department of Corrections. In 2006 she accepted a position as the Chief of Adult Probation for the City and County of San Francisco. Ms. Woodford retired from this position in 2008.

Ms. Woodford has dedicated her time to Correctional reform serving as a Senior Fellow at the Berkeley Center for Criminal Justice, teaching in Stanford University’s Continuing Studies Program, Sonoma State University and Hastings Law School. Ms. Woodford has also served as the Executive Director of Death Penalty Focus, an organization committed to ending the death penalty. Ms. Woodford continues to work on criminal justice policy and reform
