= George Ledin =

American computer scientist (born 1946)

- Born: January 28, 1946
- Died: 2022
- Education: University of California, Berkeley; University of San Francisco
- Scientific career
- Fields: Computer science
- Workplaces: Sonoma State University

George Ledin, Jr. (born January 28, 1946, died 2022) was an American computer scientist and professor of computer science at Sonoma State University. Ledin's teaching of computer security at Sonoma State was controversial for its inclusion of material on how to write malware. Ledin was a strong critic of the antivirus software industry, whose products he considered almost useless. Ledin also helped found the computer science program at the University of San Francisco, and published several books on computing in the 1970s and 1980s.

== Education and career ==
Ledin was a 1967 graduate of the University of California, Berkeley.

He started teaching computer science at the University of San Francisco in 1965, as the second computer scientist at the university, five years before the university's computer science department itself was founded. In 1970, he served as vice-president of The Fibonacci Association, and host of its annual meeting. In 1973, as a researcher in the Institute of Chemical Biology and instructor in computer science at the university, he was the chair of the first national conference on ALGOL, By 1980 he was head of the computer science department at the university.

He earned a Juris Doctor at the University of San Francisco in 1982, and moved to the Sonoma State faculty in 1984.

== Books ==
Ledin was author or co-author of books including:

- Programming the IBM 1130 (with Robert K. Louden, 2nd ed., Prentice-Hall, 1972)
- A Structured Approach to General BASIC (Boyd & Fraser, 1978)
- The Programmer's Book of Rules (Lifetime Learning / Wiley, 1979)
- Understanding Pascal (Alfred Publishing, 1981)
- Pascal (Mayfield Publishing, 1982)
- The Personal Computer Glossary (Alfred Publishing, 1983)
- The COBOL Programmer's Book of Rules (with Victor Ledin and Michael D. Kudlick, Lifetime Learning / Wiley, 1983).

== Personal life ==
Ledin was born in Austria. He and his co-author Victor Ledin are brothers, both sons of Georgii Grigorievich Ledin (1921–2019), an immigrant from the Georgian city of Sukhumi.
