= Leonard Beerman =

American rabbi (1921–2014)

Rabbi Leonard Beerman
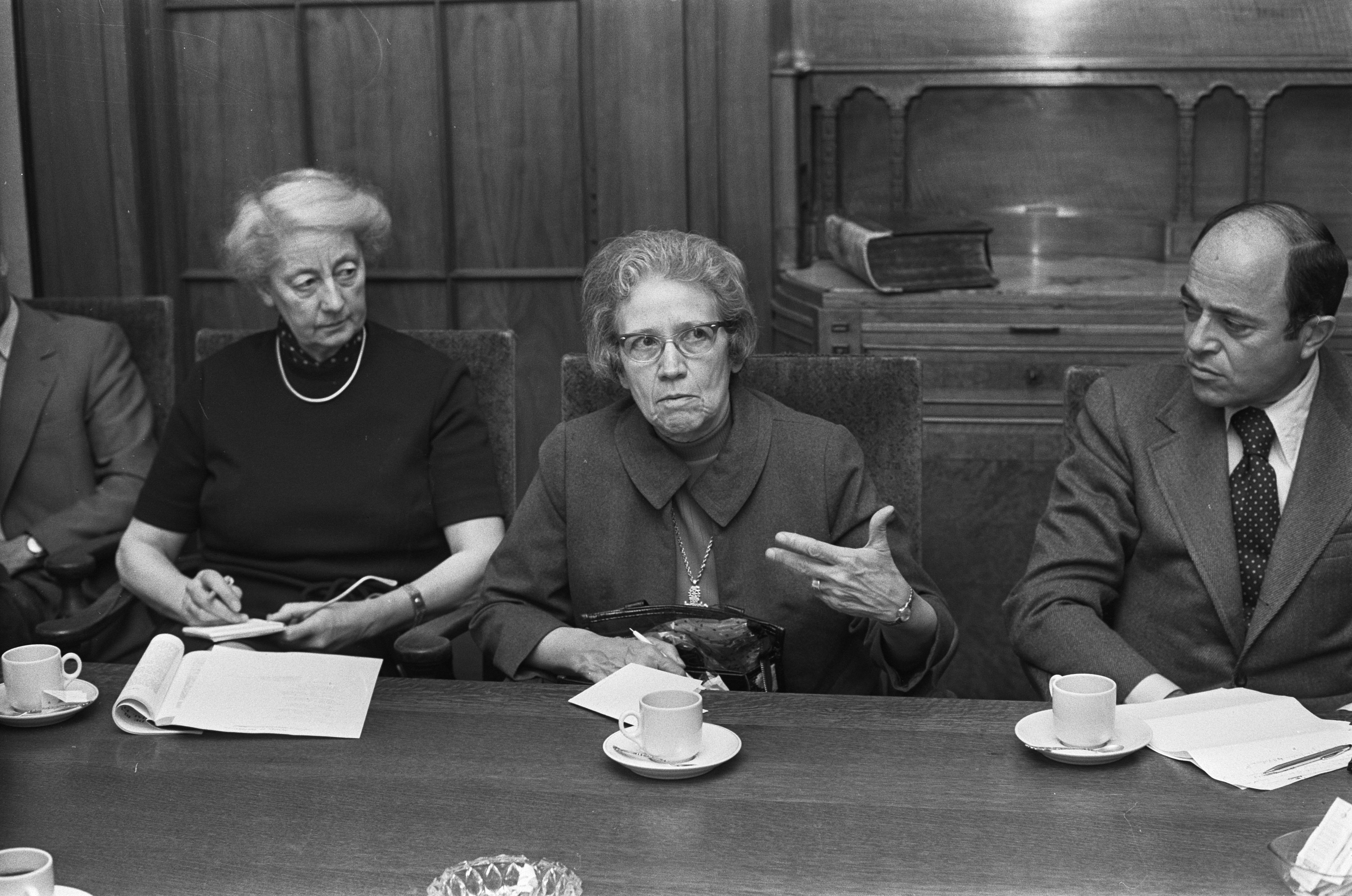
- Leonard Beerman (right) in 1973
- Title: Founding Rabbi of Leo Baeck Temple (Los Angeles, California)

Personal life
- Born: Leonard Irving Beerman; April 9, 1921 Altoona, Pennsylvania
- Died: December 24, 2014 (age 93) Los Angeles, California
- Spouse: Martha Fechheimer Beerman 1945-1986 (her death); Joan Willens Beerman 1988-2014 (his death)
- Children: Judith, Eve, Elizabeth, Elara, Scott (2 stepchildren), 6 grandchildren
- Parent(s): Paul (deceased) and Tillie Grossman Beerman (deceased)
- Education: Penn State
- Occupation: Founding Rabbi

Religious life
- Religion: Judaism
- Denomination: Reform
- Profession: Reform rabbi

Jewish leader
- Successor: Rabbi Sanford Ragins
- Synagogue: Leo Baeck Temple, Bel Air
- Began: 1949
- Ended: 1986

Leonard Irving Beerman (April 9, 1921 – December 24, 2014) was an American Reform rabbi. He served for 37 years at Leo Baeck Temple in Los Angeles as founding rabbi. He was known for his liberal political activism, his support of interfaith dialogue, and his advocacy of peace and a two-state solution in the Middle East.

== Biography ==
Beerman was born in Altoona, Pennsylvania to Paul and Tillie Beerman. His father was a traveling salesman of women's lingerie, and his mother was a homemaker. He spent some of his later childhood in Owosso, Michigan, then returned to Altoona and studied at Penn State, from which he graduated in 1942. He served but did not see combat in the United States Marines during World War II, studied for the rabbinate at Hebrew Union College in Cincinnati, and briefly joined the Haganah in 1947 while studying for his rabbinical degree in Israel. In a later interview Beerman said that his pacifist convictions arose during his five months experience with the Haganah.

After receiving his rabbinical ordination and a master's degree from Hebrew Union College, he and his wife moved west in 1949 to take the pulpit at Leo Baeck Temple, which was then a new congregation with 28 families. As the temple grew in size and influence, and ultimately moved to a campus in Bel Air, Beerman became known for his political activism, his opposition to the Vietnam War, his support for interfaith dialogue with Christians and Muslims, and his willingness to criticize actions of the Israeli government and its defense forces. He held a longtime position as "rabbi-in-residence" at All Saints Episcopal Church in Pasadena. Beerman acknowledged his own agnosticism and found a structure for his personal theology in the pantheism of Baruch Spinoza.

Beerman retired from Leo Baeck Temple in 1986. His first wife, Martha, died suddenly a few days after his retirement celebration. He also lost an 8-year-old granddaughter to sudden death in 1993.

== Personal life ==
Beerman married Martha Fechheimer of Cincinnati in 1945. After living in Israel for a short time they moved to Los Angeles where Leonard was hired to lead Temple Beth Aaron. In 1949, that congregation became Leo Baeck Temple. He had three children with Martha: Judith Beerman O'Hanlon (b. 1951), Eve Beerman (b. 1953) and Elizabeth Beerman Rothbart (b. 1957),

Martha died suddenly following a brief illness at the age of 63, just two days after Leonard's retirement celebration in 1986. A few months later, Leonard was set up on a date with recently divorced Joan Willens, and the two were married the following year on March 19, 1988. They were married until Leonard's death in 2014.

== Death ==
Beerman died at the age of 93 of congestive heart failure in the early hours of December 24, 2014 at Cedars-Sinai Hospital. His time of death is said to be fitting, as it was the early hours of Christmas Eve, while that evening would also be the eighth and final night of Hanukkah. The weaving of interfaith relations was prominent in Leonard's work. He had been ill for a few months after dealing with multiple health issues. His last public appearance was at Leo Baeck Temple on October 4, 2014, where he gave his Yom Kippur sermon. He is survived by his second wife, Joan, three children, Judith (Neil) Beerman O'Hanlon, Eve Beerman, and Elizabeth (Lew) Beerman Rothbart two stepchildren, Elara Willens and Scott (Marina) Willens and four grandchildren—Matthew and Emma O'Hanlon, Emily and Michael Rothbart and two step grandchildren, Leo and Evan Willens.

== Legacy ==
David N. Myers, Chair of the UCLA History Department and a close friend of Beerman, has edited a collection Rabbi Beerman's writings, "The Eternal Dissident: Rabbi Leonard I. Beerman and the Radical Imperative to Think and Act," which was released May 16, 2018. A celebratory event in honor of the release was held a few weeks later at Leo Baeck Temple. The Leonard I. Beerman Foundation for Peace & Justice was launched in 2015 in Leonard's honor, to recognize and support organizations and individuals who similarly work to improve the human condition and further strive for peace and justice in the world. Civil rights leader and Congressman John Lewis was the inaugural recipient of the Leonard I. Beerman Award for Social Justice in Action in the summer of 2017.
