= Aqeela Sherrills =

Activist against gang violence

Aqeela Sherrills is a campaigner against gang violence and the death penalty who lives in Watts, Los Angeles, United States.

In 1992, Sherrills brokered a peace agreement between the Bloods and the Crips (two rival gangs). His son, Terrell Sherrills, was shot to death in 2004 in an apparently random killing. He is executive director and co-founder (with his brother Daude) of the Community Self-Determination Institute. He also co-founded Amer-I-Can with American football player Jim Brown.

In 2005, Sherrills visited sacred sites around the world, and upon returning to Watts he launched The Reverence Movement. As a peace movement, The Reverence Movement is:

a multi-tiered consultant company focused on shifting world wide imagination by instituting a practice of authentic exploration of the wounds in the personal life as a means of accesses the gift of who we are by not defining ourselves as our experiences.

A longtime anti-death penalty activist, Sherrills became the Southern California Outreach Coordinator for California Crime Victims for Alternatives to the Death Penalty (CCV) in 2010. Through his work with CCV, he speaks out against the death penalty alongside other murder victim family members who also oppose the death penalty.
