= Maurice Hastings =

American wrongfully convicted, former prisoner (born 1953)

Maurice Hastings (born 1953) is an American former prisoner who was wrongfully convicted for the rape and murder of Roberta Wydermyer in 1983. He was released after being incarcerated for 38 years because DNA evidence linked to the murder implicated another man. Hastings requested the DNA test in the year 2000, but this was refused and was not carried out until 2021.

== Trial ==
Hastings was tried twice for the 1983 murder of Roberta Wydermyer, the first trial ended with the jury deadlocked, he was convicted after a second trial in 1988. There was no physical evidence to link Hastings to the crime and numerous witnesses gave him an alibi, as well as him maintaining his innocence. Wydermyer had been sexually assaulted and murdered by a gunshot to the head. She was found in the trunk of her car in Inglewood, Los Angeles. Hastings was given a life sentence without the possibility of parole.

== Release ==
After Wydermyer's death the coroner conducted an examination for sexual assault and found semen in an oral swab. In 2000, The District Attorney office refused permission for the swab to be tested for DNA. In June 2021, the DNA test was carried out and linked Kenneth Packnett to Wydermyer's murder. The suspect had been convicted for a separate but similar crime - the violent kidnap and oral rape of a woman during which he had placed her in the trunk of a car. Packnett had been given a 56-year sentence, and in 2020 had died in prison.

Hastings was released on October 20, 2022, after serving 38 years, he had maintained his innocence throughout his time in prison. District attorney, George Gascón, said "What has happened to Mr Hastings is a terrible injustice."

Upon his release Hastings is reported to have said "I prayed for many years that this day would come," and "I am not pointing fingers; I am not standing up here a bitter man, but I just want to enjoy my life now while I have it."

In 2025, Hastings was awarded $25 million for wrongful conviction. He had brought a case against two police officers and the district attorney at the time. Hastings said "No amount of money could ever restore the 38 years of my life that were stolen from me"..."But this settlement is a welcome end to a very long road."
