= Leden =

Leden is a surname. Notable people with the surname include:

- Christian Leden (1882–1957), Norwegian ethno-musicologist and composer
- Gijs van der Leden (born 1967), Dutch water polo player
- Judy Leden (born 1959), British hang glider and paraglider pilot

== See also ==
- Ledin
