= Wendell L. Ledin Sr. =

American politician (1897–1965)

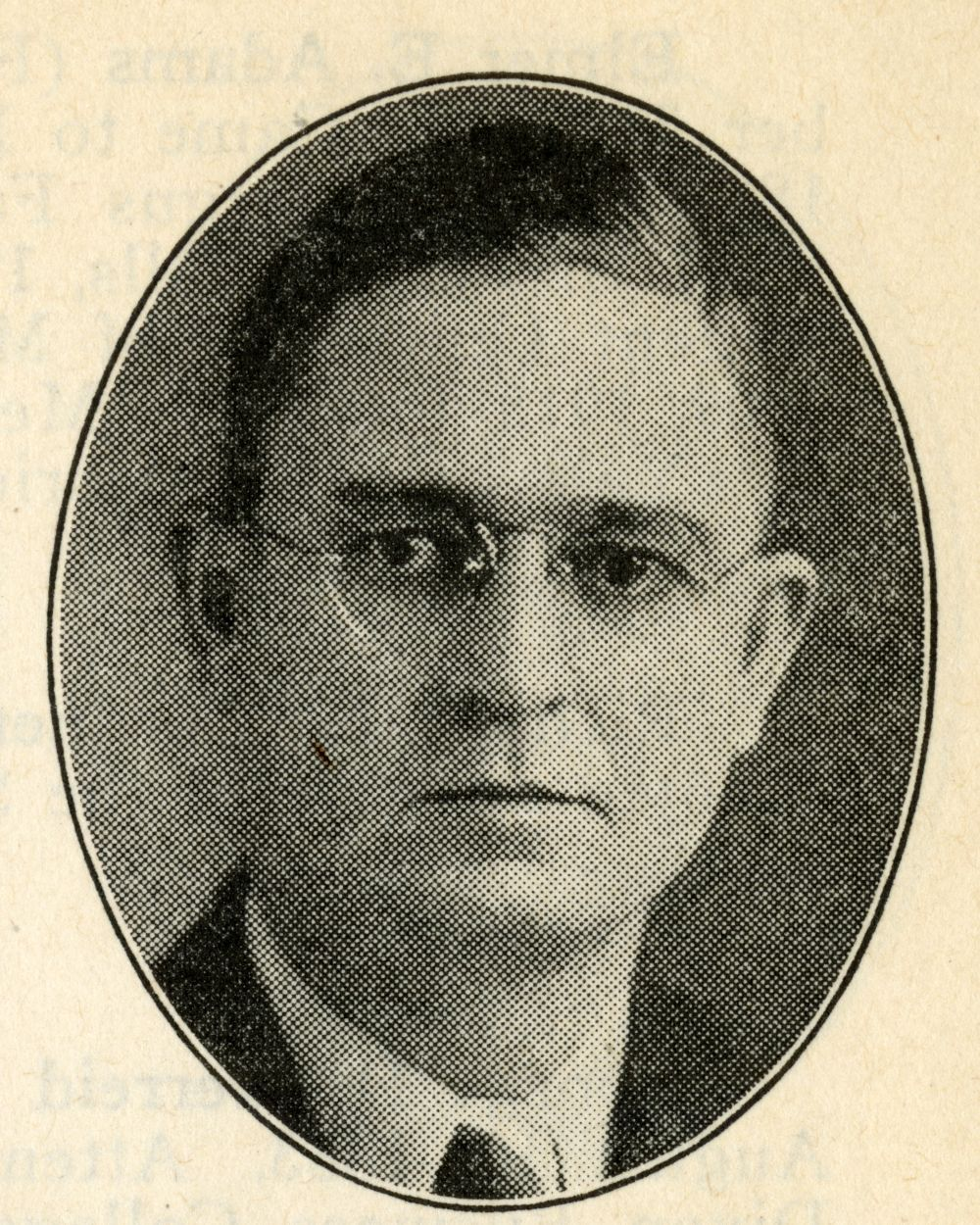
Senator Wendell L. Ledin, 1941-1942 Legislative Session, Minnesota Legislature

Wendell L. Ledin Sr. (April 25, 1897 – November 13, 1965) was an American businessman, politician, and a member of the Minnesota Senate. Ledin was born in Spring Lake, Isanti County, Minnesota.

He moved with his parents in the late 1890s to Bethel, Anoka County, Minnesota. Ledin lived in Bethel, Minnesota with his wife and family. Wendell Ledin served in the United States Navy from 1915 to 1922. Ledin was involved with the Bethel Feed and Produce Company in Bethel, Minnesota. He served in the Minnesota Senate from 1939 to 1954. Ledin died at his son's resort: "Ash River" near Orr, Saint Louis County, Minnesota.

== Transition into politics ==
After his military service, Ledin became involved in the local business community as the operator of the Bethel Feed and Produce Company. His business acumen led him to a career in politics, where he served as a senator representing the 44th district, which included Anoka and Isanti counties, from 1939 to 1954.

During his tenure, Ledin participated in various committees, including Agriculture, Finance, Game and Fish—which he chaired—Liquor Control, Markets and Marketing, Municipal Affairs, Public Highways, Public Welfare, and others.

Ledin was known for his conservative caucus affiliation in the Nonpartisan Election. He was recognized for his leadership in legislative matters pertaining to agriculture, finance, and public welfare, among others. His commitment to public service was evident in his active involvement in the legislative process and his chairmanship of several significant committees.

== Involvement in Freemasonry ==
Outside of his legislative duties, Ledin was a member of several fraternal organizations, including the Ancient Free and Accepted Masons (A.F. and A.M.) Helios Lodge No. 273 in Cambridge, Minnesota, St. John's Royal Arch Masons, Zion Commandery, and the Zuhrah Temple Shrine in Minneapolis, Minnesota. His community involvement reflected his dedication to public service and civic engagement.

== Death ==
Wendell L. Ledin Sr. died on November 13, 1965, at his son's resort, Ash River, near Orr, Minnesota. His funeral services were held at Carlson Funeral Home in Cambridge, and he was laid to rest at the North Isanti Baptist Cemetery. His legacy as a businessman, veteran, and public servant remains a part of Minnesota's history.
