= Ricky Jackson and Ronnie and Wiley Bridgeman =

African-Americans wrongly convicted of murder in 1975

Ricky Jackson (born 1957), Ronnie Bridgeman (born 1957) and Wiley Bridgeman (September 21, 1954 – June 27, 2021) are three African Americans who were wrongfully convicted of murder as young men in Cleveland, Ohio, in 1975 and sentenced to death. Jackson's sentences were commuted to life imprisonment in 1977, while the sentences of Bridgemans were commuted to life imprisonment in 1978. They were imprisoned for decades before each of the three was exonerated in late 2014. Jackson and Wiley Bridgeman were released that year. (Ronnie Bridgeman, by then known as Kwame Ajamu, had been paroled in 2003 after 28 years in prison, and had been successful in his new life.)

According to the National Registry of Exonerations, Jackson was imprisoned for 39 years on this wrongful conviction. This was believed to be the longest record for someone who has been exonerated. Wiley Bridgeman served nearly as long.

The death sentences of each of the three men were commuted to life imprisonment after an appeals court ruled the jury had received incorrect instructions in their cases.

Wiley and Ronnie Bridgeman were initially released on parole in 2002 and 2003, respectively, after spending 27 and 28 years in jail. Wiley Bridgeman was later imprisoned again because of a parole violation.

Jackson and Wiley Bridgeman were ultimately released on November 21, 2014 after the key witness in their jury trial recanted his testimony during a hearing in Cuyahoga County Common Pleas Court. The conviction of Ronnie Bridgeman (now known as Kwame Ajamu) was thrown out in December 2014, and he was also fully exonerated. All three men received several million dollars in settlements from the state in 2015 and 2016 as compensation for their imprisonment and lost wages due to the wrongful convictions.

== Homicide ==
On May 19, 1975, businessman Harold Franks was killed outside a small grocery store on the city's East Side, where he delivered money orders. Two black men were said to have beat him and thrown acid in his face, before one of the men shot him twice with a .38 caliber. The shooter also fired a round that hit Anna Robinson, the wife of the store's owner. The men stole Franks' briefcase and fled to a waiting green car, driven by a third man.

== Charges ==
Authorities built their case against Ricky, Wiley, and Ronnie, who lived in the neighborhood, based on the testimony of then 12-year-old Eddie Vernon, who claimed to have witnessed them commit the crime. Karen Smith, a neighborhood teenage girl, had seen two young black men outside the store before the incident, but testified at trial that she did not know them. She did know the Bridgemans and Jackson. There were no other witnesses nor physical evidence against the accused. Neither the green car, Frank's briefcase, nor the gun used were ever found.

The brothers were considered "good boys" in their neighborhood, where they lived with their mother Bessie Mae Bridgeman, and another brother and sister. (Their father had died in 1974, and their mother died in 1990.) Ronnie had gone to trade school as a machinist, but was working at another job; his older brother Wiley had entered the Marines but received an honorable discharge for health reasons. The young men had never been in trouble, nor had Ricky Jackson.

Based on Vernon's testimony, they were arrested and each convicted at trial of the murder of Franks, and sentenced to death. Ricky Jackson was accused of being the shooter and never given parole. He and Ronnie Bridgeman were friends, and the latter was convicted of being the second man in the attack. His older brother Wiley was convicted of having driven the getaway car and aided the killers.

== Parole ==
In 2003, Ronnie Bridgeman was paroled. He had concentrated on education in prison and was able to get an office job. In 2004 he married and he and his wife bought a house. His brother Wiley received parole in 2002, but ran into difficulties because of his mental health, which had suffered in prison. He was returned to prison after violating parole.

== Challenge, recanting, exoneration and release ==
In June 2011 Kyle Swenson published his report on his investigation of flaws in the case against the three men, including questions about Vernon's testimony, publishing it in Cleveland Scene magazine. Two years later in 2013, Vernon recanted his testimony, confessing to a minister who visited him at a hospital.

Vernon said that a friend had given him the young men's names, and he told the police he saw the slaying. In 2014, in a signed affidavit recanting his testimony, Vernon said he was coerced by the police into testifying against Jackson and the Bridgeman brothers. He said he was not close enough to see the murder, as the school bus he rode with other children was a block away from the crime scene, the Fairmount Cut-Rate on Fairhill Road (now Stokes Boulevard) in Cleveland.

The Ohio Innocence Project has handled appeals for the three men and represented them in seeking compensation for the decades they spent in jail due to the wrongful convictions. During a court hearing on November 18, 2014, Vernon described the threats by detectives and the burden of guilt he had carried. On November 20 Cuyahoga County prosecutors filed a motion to dismiss charges against Jackson and Wiley Bridgeman. They were released at separate court hearings on the next day. When released, Jackson said he does not "hate him" (Vernon): "He's a grown man today, he was just a boy back then". In December 2014 Ronnie Bridgeman (who had taken the name Kwame Ajamu while still in prison) was also exonerated and his conviction was overturned.

After his release, Jackson was awarded $1 million in 2015 in compensation by the state of Ohio for his decades in prison due to the wrongful conviction. In 2016 he received an additional $2.65 million settlement from the state Court of Claims, based on estimates of lost income. Jackson is believed to have served the longest prison term of anyone in the United States who has been exonerated.

In April 2015, the Bridgeman brothers were awarded a combined $1.6 million in compensation for their imprisonment. Wiley Bridgeman was to receive $969,093, after serving 37 years, and Kwame Ajamu to get $647,578; he had served 28 years. In April 2016, it was announced that the Bridgeman brothers would receive an additional $4.38 million in compensation from the state. A judge approved the settlement that will award Wiley Bridgeman about $2.4 million and Kwame Ajamu $2 million. In May 2020, the city of Cleveland agreed to pay a joint $18 million deal to the three men to end their pending lawsuits.

In April 2019, Wiley Bridgeman was charged with vehicular homicide in connection with a crash which took the life of a construction worker in University Heights, Ohio. Wiley Bridgeman died on June 27, 2021.

A documentary about Ricky Jackson, Lovely Jackson, was released in 2022.

== See also ==
- List of exonerated death row inmates
- List of wrongful convictions in the United States
