= Peter Ledden =

English cricketer (1943–2025)

Personal information
- Full name: Peter Robert Varville Ledden
- Born: 12 July 1943; Scarborough, Yorkshire, England
- Died: 3 July 2025 (aged 81); Perth, Western Australia, Australia
- Batting: Left-handed
- Bowling: Right-arm medium

Domestic team information
- Years: Team
- 1961–1967: Sussex

Career statistics
| Competition | First-class | List A |
|---|---|---|
| Matches | 35 | 4 |
| Runs scored | 756 | 23 |
| Batting average | 15.12 | 5.75 |
| 100s/50s | 0/4 | 0/0 |
| Top score | 98 | 12 |
| Balls bowled | 554 | 51 |
| Wickets | 8 | 0 |
| Bowling average | 42.25 | – |
| 5 wickets in innings | 1 | 0 |
| 10 wickets in match | 0 | – |
| Best bowling | 5/43 | – |
| Catches/stumpings | 18/– | 0/– |
- Source: Cricinfo, 1 July 2012

Peter Robert Varville Ledden (12 July 1943 – 3 July 2025) was an English cricketer. Ledden was a left-handed batsman who bowled right-arm medium pace. He was born at Scarborough, Yorkshire.

Ledden made his first-class debut for Sussex against Surrey at the County Ground, Hove, in the 1961 County Championship. He made 34 further first-class appearances for the county, the last of which came against Oxford University in 1967. With the bat, he scored a total of 756 runs at an average of 15.12, with a highest score of 98. This score was one of four half centuries he made and was the top score on the match against Warwickshire in 1964. With the ball, he took 8 wickets at a bowling average of 42.25, with best figures of 5/43 against Cambridge University in 1966.

Ledden also played List A cricket for Sussex, making his debut in that format against Yorkshire in the 1963 Gillette Cup. He made three further List A appearances for Sussex, against Surrey in the 1964 Gillette Cup, the touring Australians in 1964, and Somerset in the 1966 Gillette Cup. In his four matches, he scored a total of 23 runs at an average of 5.75, with a high score of 12.

In later life, Ledden moved to Western Australia. He died in Perth on 3 July 2025.
