= Anthony G. Amsterdam =

American lawyer and law professor (born 1935)

- Born: September 12, 1935 (age 90); Philadelphia, Pennsylvania, U.S.
- Education: Haverford College (BA); University of Pennsylvania (LLB)
- Spouse: Lois P. Sheinfeld (m. 1968)
- Scientific career
- Fields: Civil rights, criminal procedure
- Institutions: NYU School of Law

Anthony Guy Amsterdam (born September 12, 1935) is an American lawyer and University Professor Emeritus at New York University School of Law. In 1981, Alan Dershowitz called Amsterdam “the most distinguished law professor in the United States.”

== Education ==
Amsterdam grew up in a middle-class neighborhood in West Philadelphia.

He received his A.B., summa cum laude in French Literature from Haverford College in 1957. He received his LL.B., summa cum laude from the University of Pennsylvania School of Law in 1960. While at Pennsylvania he served as Editor-in-Chief of the University of Pennsylvania Law Review. While serving on the Pennsylvania Law Review, he published an article, "The Void-for-Vagueness Doctrine in the Supreme Court." A 2012 study found that this article was the most-cited student-written law journal article in the history of the United States.

== Career ==
Following law school, Amsterdam was law clerk to Justice Felix Frankfurter. He then served as Assistant US Attorney in the District of Columbia.

In 1962, Amsterdam began teaching at the University of Pennsylvania. He then taught at Stanford Law School from 1969 to 1981. In 1981, he was hired by New York University School of Law after a "heated contest" among top law schools for his service. He was the Judge Edward Weinfeld Professor of Law at NYU.

Working with the NAACP Legal Defense and Educational Fund, Amsterdam argued and won Furman v. Georgia in 1972, in which the Supreme Court of the United States ruled on the requirement for a degree of consistency in the application of the death penalty. He sits on the board of directors of the Death Penalty Information Center.

Amsterdam wrote Perspectives on the Fourth Amendment, an influential paper which has been called "one of the best, if not the best, law review article[s] written on the Fourth Amendment." He was elected a Fellow of the American Academy of Arts and Sciences in 1977.

== See also ==
- List of law clerks for the second seat of the Supreme Court of the United States
