= KHBR =

KHBR may refer to:

- KHBR (AM), a radio station (1560 AM) licensed to serve Hillsboro, Texas, United States.
- KHBR-LP, a defunct low-power radio station (96.7 FM) formerly licensed to serve Decatur, Arkansas, United States.
