= Jake Fawcett (American football) =

American football guard and tackle

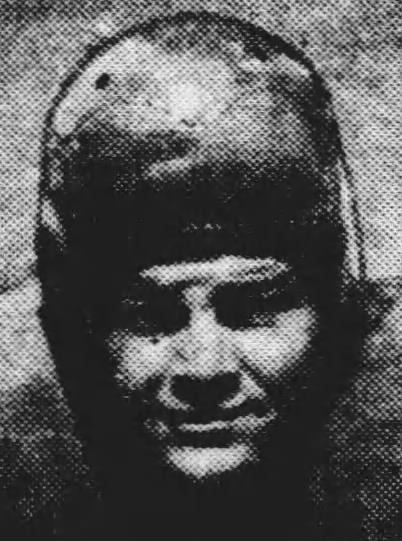
- Fawcett in 1941

No. 57, 44/21, 42
- Positions: Guard; Tackle

Personal information
- Born: May 29, 1919; Hillsboro, Texas, U.S.
- Died: April 29, 1990 (aged 70); Waco, Texas, U.S.

Career information
- High school: Hillsboro
- College: SMU (1938–1941)

Career history
- Cleveland Rams (1942); Brooklyn Dodgers (1943); Cleveland Rams (1944); Los Angeles Rams (1946)

Jacob Robert Fawcett Jr. (May 29, 1919 – April 29, 1990) was an American professional football guard and tackle. He played for the Cleveland Rams, the Brooklyn Dodgers and the Los Angeles Rams of the National Football League (NFL).

== Life and career ==
Fawcett was born in Hillsboro, Texas, the son of J.R. Fawcett. He played high school football as a tackle at Hillsboro High School. He then enrolled at Southern Methodist University to play college football for the SMU Mustangs. He was on the freshman team in 1938, and was a three-year varsity letterman from 1939 to 1941.

In January 1942, Fawcett joined the Cleveland Rams of the National Football League (NFL). He played in eleven games during the 1942 NFL season, and in 1943, he was allocated to the Brooklyn Dodgers. He started ten games for the team, and played in ten games during the 1943 NFL season, and in 1944, he returned to the Cleveland Rams. He started ten games for the team, and played in ten games during the 1944 NFL season, and in 1946, he joined the Los Angeles Rams. He played in six games during the 1946 NFL season, but was released from the team in 1947. Aside from his football career, he worked as a purchasing agent, and he served in the United States Navy.

According to The Waco Tribune-Herald, in 1951, Fawcett was named "Hillsboro Man of the Year".

== Death ==
Fawcett died on April 29, 1990, in a hospital in Waco, Texas, at the age of 70.
