= Hillsboro High School (Texas) =

Public school in Texas, United States

Location
- 1600 Abbott Ave. Hillsboro, Texas 76645-2695; United States; 31.9829°N 97.1277°W

Information
- School type: Public high school
- School district: Hillsboro Independent School District
- Principal: Jo Hayes
- Teaching staff: 45.97 (FTE)
- Grades: 9-12
- Enrollment: 616 (2024–2025)
- Student to teacher ratio: 13.40
- Colors: Maroon & White
- Athletics conference: UIL Class AAAA
- Mascot: Eagle
- Yearbook: El Aguila
- Website: hillsboroisd.org

Hillsboro High School is a public high school located in the city of Hillsboro, Texas, United States and classified as a 4A school by the University Interscholastic League (UIL). It is a part of the Hillsboro Independent School District located in central Hill County. In 2015, the school was rated "Met Standard" by the Texas Education Agency.

== Athletics ==
The Hillsboro Eagles compete in these sports: volleyball, cross country, football, basketball, powerlifting, golf, tennis, track, baseball, and softball.

=== State titles ===
- Boys' track, 1918 (1A)

== Notable alumni ==
- Bob Bullock, 38th Lieutenant Governor of Texas
- James "Red" Duke, professor and surgeon at University of Texas Health Science Center at Houston and Memorial Hermann–Texas Medical Center
- Jake Fawcett, NFL player
- Mike Harris, NBA and CBA player
- Wood B. Kyle, USMC major general
- Billy Patterson, NFL player
- Derel Walker, CFL player
