= Derel Walker =

American gridiron football player (born 1991)

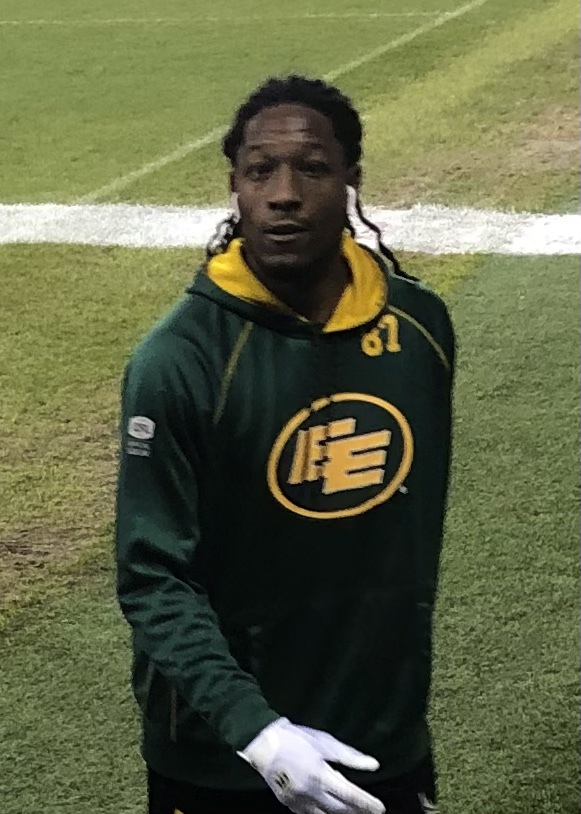
- Walker with the Edmonton Elks in 2021

Profile
- Position: Wide receiver

Personal information
- Born: June 29, 1991 (age 35); Hillsboro, Texas, U.S.
- Listed height: 6 ft 2 in (1.88 m)
- Listed weight: 187 lb (85 kg)

Career information
- High school: Hillsboro (TX)
- College: Texas A&M

Career history
- 2014: Tennessee Titans*
- 2014: Omaha Mammoths
- 2015–2016: Edmonton Eskimos
- 2017: Tampa Bay Buccaneers*
- 2017–2018: Edmonton Eskimos
- 2019: Toronto Argonauts
- 2021–2022: Edmonton Elks
- 2023: Saskatchewan Roughriders
- 2023: Hamilton Tiger-Cats
- * Offseason or practice squad member only

Awards and highlights
- Grey Cup champion (2015); CFL's Most Outstanding Rookie Award (2015); Jackie Parker Trophy (2015); 2× CFL All-Star (2015, 2016); 3× CFL West All-Star (2015, 2016, 2018); CFL East All-Star (2019)

Career CFL statistics
- Receptions: 474
- Receiving yards: 6,681
- Receiving average: 14.1
- Receiving Touchdowns: 34
- Stats at Pro Football Reference
- Stats at CFL.ca

Derel Walker (born June 29, 1991) is an American professional football wide receiver. He was named a CFL All-Star in 2015 and 2016 and received the CFL's Most Outstanding Rookie Award in 2015. He is a Grey Cup champion after winning the 103rd Grey Cup with the Edmonton Eskimos in his rookie year. He previously attended Texas A&M University where he played college football for the Aggies.

== Early life and college ==
Walker played high school football as well as baseball and track and field at Hillsboro High School in Hillsboro, Texas. He also participated in power-lifting. He was named an honorable mention to the 2008 Super Centex team and a member of the 2009 All-Centex team by the Waco Tribune-Herald. From 2010 to 2011, he played junior college football at the local Trinity Valley Community College. During his two seasons at Trinity Valley, he made 44 catches for 864 yards and 10 touchdowns while helping to lead his team to the second round of playoffs in 2011.

Walker committed to transfer to Texas A&M in early 2012 to play for the Aggies. In a fall scrimmage, Walker caught two touchdown passes of 20 and 35 yards. He played a minor role in the regular season, playing in 12 games but catching only eight passes for 85 yards and no touchdowns. Walker was more active in his final year with the Aggies in 2013. He played large roles against Arkansas when he caught seven passes for 81 yards and against Vanderbilt when he caught his first two touchdown passes at Texas A&M. Walker was third on the team in catches with 45 receptions and second on the team with 705 receiving yards in the regular season. In the post-season, Walker made an impact at the Chick-fil-A Peach Bowl, where he made six catches for 113 yards including a 44-yard touchdown. He finished his career at Texas A&M with finishing with 59 receptions for 903 yards and five touchdowns. Walker was the last receiver to catch a pass from quarterback Johnny Manziel before Manziel was drafted by the Cleveland Browns.

== Professional career ==
=== Tennessee Titans ===
Walker was eligible for the 2014 NFL draft but went undrafted. He was later signed by the Tennessee Titans as a free agent. He was released at the end of the pre-season in 2014.

=== Edmonton Eskimos (first stint) ===
Walker was signed as a free agent by the Edmonton Eskimos on April 29, 2015 after participating in an Eskimos mini-camp in Florida. He was placed on the practice roster at the end of the pre-season, where he remained until he was activated in early August following a hip injury to Adarius Bowman. Walker made his CFL debut in a game against the Montreal Alouettes on August 13, where he recorded 10 catches for 125 yards as well as a tackle. The following week against the Hamilton Tiger-Cats, Walker caught 14 passes for 183 yards. Walker would go on to finish the 2015 CFL season with 89 receptions and 1,110 yards and 6 touchdowns (in only 12 games played). In the Western Final, Derel Walker had 11 receptions for 125 yards and a touchdown as the Eskimos advanced to the 103rd Grey Cup game over the Calgary Stampeders, their provincial rivals. During the Grey Cup festivities, Walker was named the CFL's Most Outstanding Rookie. Walker continued to perform well into the 2016 season, finishing second in the league in both receptions (109) and yards (1,589) trailing teammate Adarius Bowman in both instances. Shortly after the end of their season, the Eskimos released Walker to allow him to pursue an NFL career. Walker's CFL contract was originally scheduled to expire in February 2017.

=== Tampa Bay Buccaneers ===
On January 5, 2017, Walker signed a reserve/future contract with the Tampa Bay Buccaneers, reuniting him with college teammate Mike Evans. He was released by the Buccaneers on September 2, 2017 after recording just one reception for 15 yards in the preseason.

=== Edmonton Eskimos (second stint) ===
On September 6, 2017, it was announced that Walker had re-signed with the Eskimos. Walker only played in eight games for the Eskimos in 2017, but caught 48 passes for 634 yards with two touchdowns. On January 12, 2018, the Eskimos announced that they had signed Walker to a one-year contract extension through the 2018 season. Walker was fourth in the league in receiving yards (875) in early September 2018 when it was announced we would miss the next six to eight games with a knee injury. Walker missed the rest of the season, but was still named a divisional All-Star.

=== Toronto Argonauts ===
As a highly coveted free agent, Walker visited with Toronto Argonauts General Manager Jim Popp over several days, and eventually signed a one-year contract reportedly for $275,000 Canadian, making him the highest paid non-quarterback in the CFL. Walker's 2019 started off slowly, seeing few targets from starting quarterback and fellow former Edmonton player James Franklin, who resorted to check downs to Llevi Noel. However, once Franklin was injured and McLeod Bethel-Thompson was inserted for the majority of the year, Walker's playmaking abilities as a deep threat could be fully utilized. His two best games had 9 catches and two touchdowns each, and yardage totals of 188 and 203 yards. Walker finished the last few games of 2019 on the injured list, but had made 65 catches for 1,040 yards and 6 scores. He was the team leader in receiving yards by 1 yard (S.J. Green finished with 1,039), and was named the Argos nominee for Most Outstanding Player award. Both Walker and Green were named divisional All-Stars, the only Toronto players from the offense to be named to the list. Walker was not re-signed by the Argonauts following the 2019 season and became a free agent on February 11, 2020.

=== Edmonton Elks (third stint) ===
Walker did not sign with a team in 2020 as the 2020 CFL season was cancelled. On January 8, 2021, it was announced that he had re-signed with the Edmonton Football Team to a one-year contract. He played in 11 regular season games where he had 44 catches for 531 yards and no touchdowns. Walker re-signed with the Elks on February 5, 2022. In 2022, he played in 16 regular season games and recorded 65 receptions for 874 yards and one touchdown. He became a free agent upon the expiry of his contract on February 14, 2023.

=== Saskatchewan Roughriders ===
On March 2, 2023, it was announced that Walker had signed with the Saskatchewan Roughriders. He played in one game with the team where he had three receptions for 28 yards and one receiving touchdown before being moved to the injured list. He was later released on August 9, 2023.

=== Hamilton Tiger-Cats ===
On September 27, 2023, it was announced that Walker had signed with the Hamilton Tiger-Cats. He played in two games where he recorded three receptions for 14 yards. He became a free agent upon the expiry of his contract on February 13, 2024.
