= Hillsboro Independent School District =

School district in Texas, United States

Location
- Hillsboro, TX ESC Region 12 USA

District information
- Type: Public
- Grades: Pre-K through 12
- Superintendent: Vicki Adams

Students and staff
- Athletic conference: UIL Class AAAA
- Colors: Maroon, Gray, Black

Other information
- Mascot: Eagle
- Website: Hillsboro ISD

Hillsboro Independent School District is a public school district based in Hillsboro, Texas (USA).

In addition to Hillsboro, the district also serves a portion of Carl's Corner.

In 2011, the school district was rated "Recognized" by the Texas Education Agency.

== Schools ==
- Hillsboro High (Grades 9–12)
- Hillsboro Junior High (Grades 7–8)
- Hillsboro Intermediate (Grades 4–6)
- Hillsboro Elementary (Grades PK-3)
