= Billy Patterson =

American football player (1918–1998)

No. 57
- Positions: Quarterback, Halfback, Punter

Personal information
- Born: August 20, 1918; Hillsboro, Texas, U.S.
- Died: July 10, 1998 (aged 79); McAllen, Texas, U.S.
- Listed height: 5 ft 10 in (1.78 m)
- Listed weight: 167 lb (76 kg)

Career information
- High school: Hillsboro
- College: Baylor (1935-1938)
- NFL draft: 1939: 3rd round, 17th overall pick

Career history
- Chicago Cardinals (1939); Pittsburgh Steelers (1940)

Awards and highlights
- Second-team All-American (1938); 2× First-team All-SWC (1937, 1938); NCAA passing yards leader (1937)

Career NFL statistics
- Passing attempts: 155
- Passing completions: 48
- Completion percentage: 31.0%
- TD–INT: 6–19
- Passing yards: 756
- Passer rating: 21.5
- Rushing yards: 205
- Stats at Pro Football Reference

Joseph William "Billy" Patterson Jr. (August 20, 1918 – July 10, 1998) was an American professional football player who played two seasons in the National Football League (NFL) with the Chicago Cardinals and Pittsburgh Steelers.

== Early life ==
Patterson was born in Hillsboro, Texas and attended Hillsboro High School. He was inducted into the Texas High School Football Hall of Fame in 1988.

Patterson matriculated at Baylor University. He was named to Baylor's 1930s All-Decade Team and was the 1939 East–West Shrine Game MVP. Patterson was inducted into the Baylor Hall of Fame in 1963.

== Football career ==
Patterson was drafted by the Pittsburgh Pirates in the third round of the 1939 NFL draft. He played for the Chicago Cardinals in 1939 and returned to the Steelers in 1940. He played quarterback, halfback and punted.

== See also ==
- List of college football yearly passing leaders
