= Hillsboro Reporter =

Weekly newspaper in Texas, US

- Type: Weekly newspaper
- Founded: 1963
- Headquarters: 335 Country Club Rd
- City: Hillsboro, Texas
- Website: hillsbororeporter.com

The Hillsboro Reporter is a weekly newspaper based in Hillsboro, Texas, United States. The newspaper began publication in 1963 and is the sole news publication for the city.

The Hillsboro Reporter also operates the KHBR (AM) radio station.
