= Drew Nellins Smith =

American writer

- Education: University of Texas at Austin
- Occupation: Writer
- Notable work: Arcade

Drew Nellins Smith is an American writer. In 2016 Smith published the novel Arcade.

== Early life ==
Smith grew up in Hillsboro, Texas. He then attended University of Texas at Austin, majoring English Literature.

== Writing career ==
Smith has written for publications including Tin House, The Millions, and the Los Angeles Times. He has also reviewed books for publications including The Washington Post, the Dallas Morning News, and The Daily Beast. In 2016 Smith released his first novel Arcade. The book, based in Texas, follows the story of narrator Sam, who after a failed relationship, begins pursuing a lifestyle of anonymous sex in an adult book store. The foundation of the work comes from a real-life bookstore that existed in Austin off U.S. Highway 290 that the author once frequented; he has stated that the book is largely based upon his own journey of coming out. The Los Angeles Review of Books wrote of his writing that, "guides us through this world of secret transactions and unwritten rules with skill and precision." Smith has also written on similar topics in publications like Vice.
