= Grimes Garage =

Garage in Texas listed as historic place

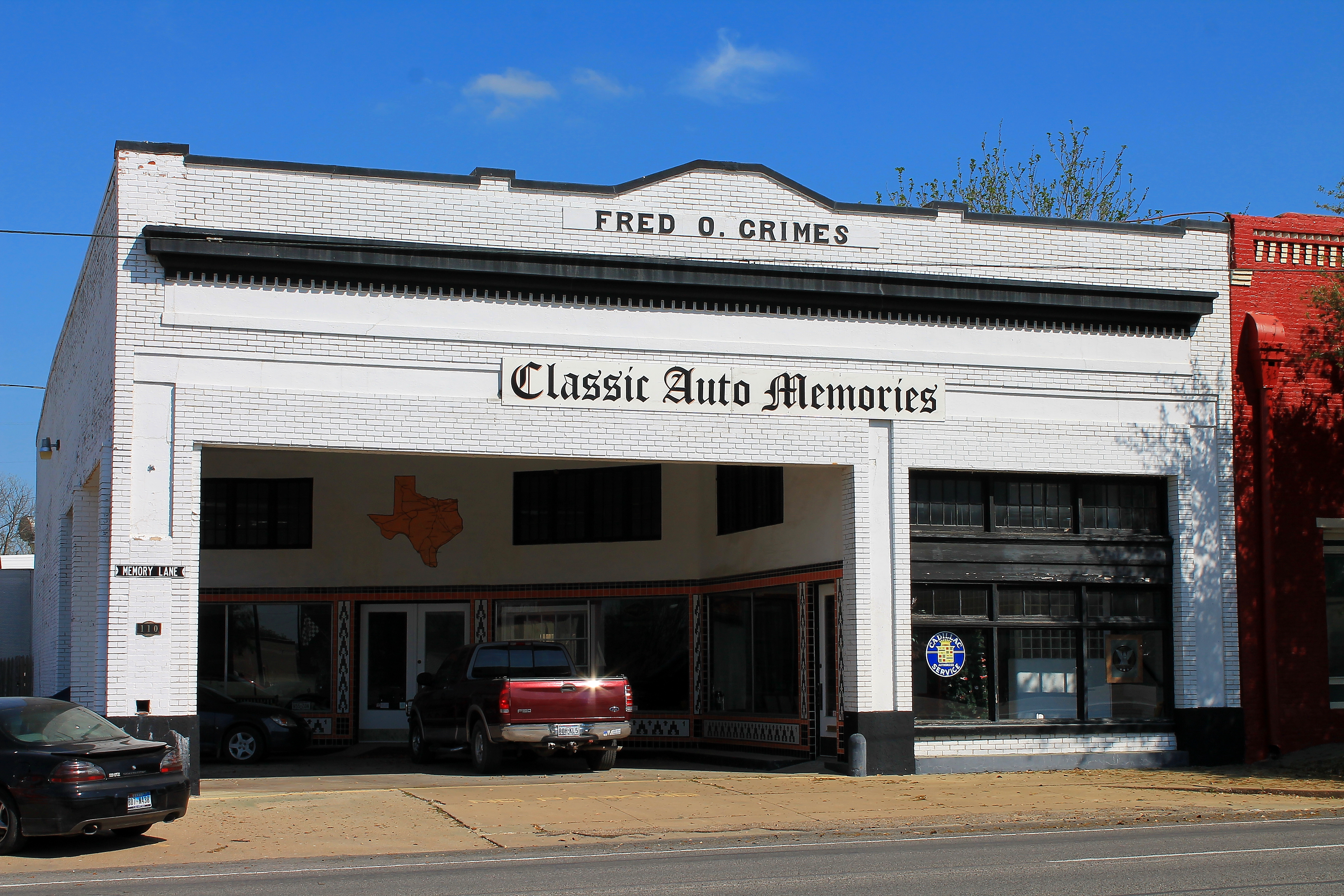

Grimes Garage is an automobile repair shop located in Hillsboro, Texas, open from 1913 to 1965. Famous for its advertising and high standards, the garage has been nicked named "The most famous garage in the world". It was listed on the National Register of Historic Places in 1984.

== History ==
The garage was founded by Fred Grimes Sr. in 1906, but remained closed due to low traffic in the area in Hill County. It reopened in 1913.

In 2018, the building became Texas Through Time, a museum dedicated to state paleontology.
