= KHBR (AM) =

- Hillsboro, Texas; United States
- Broadcast area: Waco area
- Frequency: 1560 kHz
- Branding: KHBR 1560 AM

Programming
- Format: Country

Ownership
- Owner: KHBR Radio, Inc.

History
- First air date: May 21, 1948
- Call sign meaning: HillsBoRo

Technical information
- Licensing authority: FCC
- Facility ID: 34524
- Class: D
- Power: 250 watts day only
- Transmitter coordinates: 32°1′0″N 97°6′32″W

Links
- Public license information: Public file; LMS
- Webcast: listen.streamon.fm/khbr
- Website: hillsbororeporter.com

KHBR (1560 AM) is an American radio station broadcasting a country music format. Licensed to Hillsboro, Texas, the station broadcasts to the greater Waco, Texas, area. The station is currently owned by KHBR Radio, Inc.
