= Hillsboro, Texas =

Hillsboro
- City
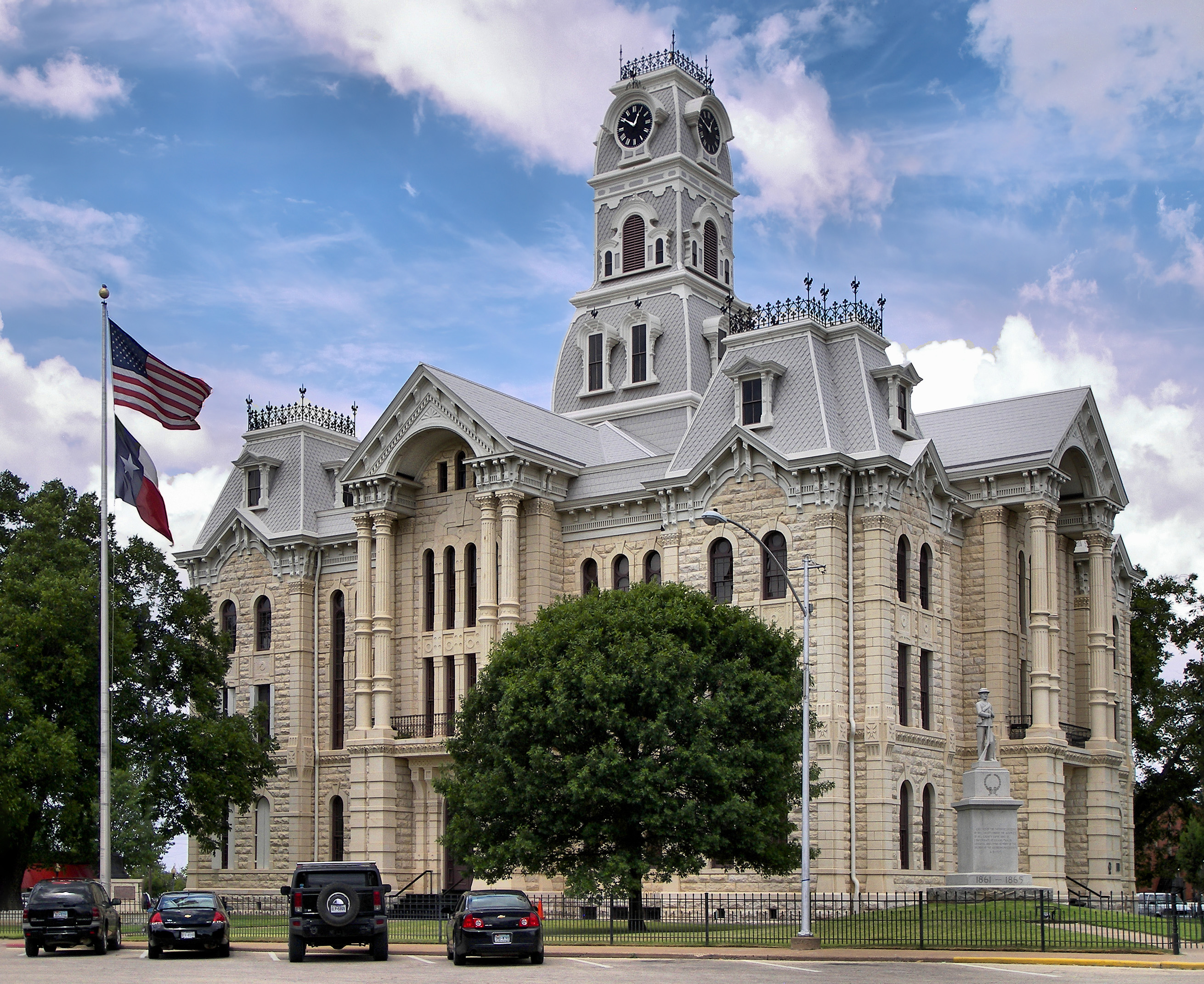
- Hill County Courthouse in 2013

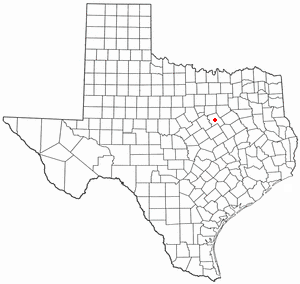
- Location of Hillsboro, Texas

- Location in Texas Hillsboro (the United States)
- Coordinates: 32°00′24″N 97°07′28″W
- Country: United States
- State: Texas
- County: Hill

Government
  - Type: Council-manager government
  - Mayor: Scott Johnson

Area
  - Total: 10.97 sq mi (28.42 km^{2})
  - Land: 10.87 sq mi (28.15 km^{2})
  - Water: 0.10 sq mi (0.27 km^{2})
- Elevation: 643 ft (196 m)

Population (2020)
  - Total: 8,221
  - Density: 779.8/sq mi (301.08/km^{2})
- Time zone: UTC-6 (Central (CST))
  - Summer (DST): UTC-5 (CDT)
- ZIP code: 76645
- Area code: 254
- FIPS code: 48-34088
- GNIS feature ID: 2410766
- Website: www.hillsborotx.org

Hillsboro is a city in and the county seat of Hill County, Texas, United States. As of the 2020 census, Hillsboro had a population of 8,221. It is located between Dallas, Fort Worth and Waco, directly on Interstate 35 in North Central Texas. Hillsboro draws trade from throughout the county, and from Interstate 35 travelers between Dallas, Fort Worth, and Waco.

Hillsboro is the gateway to Lake Whitney, Lake Whitney State Park, and nearby Lake Aquilla - all within a 15 minute drive from Hillsboro, Texas.

== History ==
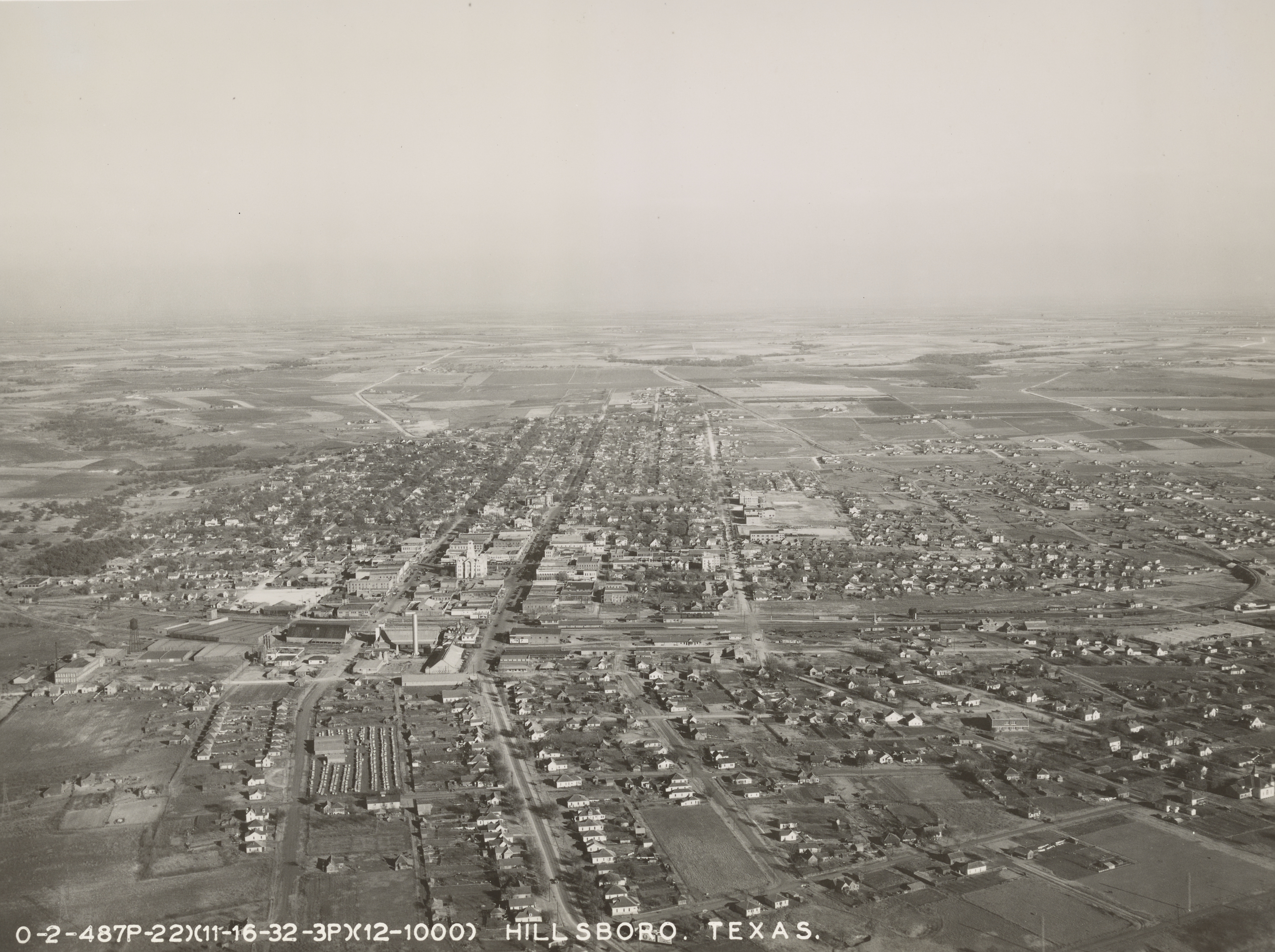
Hillsboro in 1932

In 1853, the Texas Legislature carved Hill County out of Navarro County. Named for physician and Republic of Texas Secretary of War Dr. George Washington Hill, the new county had only recently attracted Anglo settlement, following the establishment in 1848 of Fort Graham. County commissioners selected Hillsboro, originally spelled Hillsborough, as county seat. They established the town on land donated by Thomas Steiner, John Caruthers and Jonathan Newby, and the community soon had a school and post office, as well as a wood-frame courthouse. Cotton became the mainstay of Hillsboro’s late 19th-century economy. The city experienced rapid growth after the Missouri, Kansas & Texas Railroad and other lines came to the town in the early 1880s. In addition to bringing new settlers and giving access to shipping and transportation, railroads provided many new jobs. The city continued to grow and incorporated in 1881. The cotton industry produced a building boom between 1890 and 1910, as evidenced by the numerous Queen Anne homes still intact today, as well as the noted 1890 Hill County Courthouse. In 1923, the community established the Hillsboro Junior College, which over the years has become Hill College.

== Education ==
The city of Hillsboro is served by the Hillsboro Independent School District.

Hill College, located in Hillsboro, provides educational programs to enrolled students, the community, local workforce and area businesses and adult learners.

Hillsboro has private Christian academies and home school groups, in addition to the school district and college.

== Media ==
Locally, Hillsboro is served by KHBR Radio - 1560 AM and The Reporter newspaper. Hillsboro is also served by the Waco/Killeen/Temple TV market and the Waco radio market.

Additionally, most radio stations from the Dallas–Fort Worth metroplex can be heard in Hillsboro.

== Culture ==
Hillsboro is a rural city located directly on Interstate 35 between Dallas-Fort Worth and Waco.

Hillsboro's location offers residents and business significant advantages as the seat of Hill County attracts trade from a 30+ mile radius of county cities, and a significant portion of Interstate travelers. With an active and close-knit community, Hillsboro's culture includes numerous events and programs continuously through the year for both residents and visitors.

Large annual events in Hillsboro include:

- January - Hill County Fair/Livestock Show
- February - Fire & Ice Dinner at the Rusted Chandelier
- March - Hill College Rodeo
- April - Starlight Bar Night in downtown Hillsboro
- May - Churrofest Annual Festival with Concerts & Margarita Walk
- May to October - The Hillsboro Farmers Market at the Courthouse Square
- May, June, Sept, Oct - Free Saturday Night Summer Concert Series, Weekly from 8 to 11 pm
- June - The Bond's Alley Art Festival
- July - 4th of July Late Bloomers Parade in the Historic Residential District
- October - Autumnfest Annual Festival
- December - Christmas Under the Stars Parade & Tree Lighting

== Geography ==
Hillsboro is located near the geographic center of Hill County. Interstate 35 passes through the eastern side of the city, with access from Exits 364 through 370. The I-35E/I-35W split is just north of the city limits. Hillsboro is 56 miles (90 km) south of Fort Worth, 62 miles (100 km) southwest of Dallas, and 34 miles (55 km) north of Waco.

Texas State Highway 22 runs through the center of Hillsboro on West Elm Street, South Waco Street, and Corsicana Highway. It leads west 19 miles (31 km) to Lake Whitney and east 40 miles (64 km) to Corsicana. Texas State Highway 171 passes through Hillsboro with Highway 22, but leads northwest 29 miles (47 km) to Cleburne and southeast 23 miles (37 km) to Hubbard.

=== Climate ===
Hillsboro has a humid subtropical climate (Köppen: Cfa) with long, hot summers and short, mild winters.

Climate data for Hillsboro, Texas (1991–2020 normals, extremes 1903–present)
Month	Jan	Feb	Mar	Apr	May	Jun	Jul	Aug	Sep	Oct	Nov	Dec	Year
Record high °F (°C)	89 (32)	97 (36)	100 (38)	101 (38)	104 (40)	109 (43)	113 (45)	112 (44)	110 (43)	103 (39)	93 (34)	90 (32)	113 (45)
Mean maximum °F (°C)	77.2 (25.1)	80.8 (27.1)	84.9 (29.4)	88.2 (31.2)	92.8 (33.8)	97.2 (36.2)	101.6 (38.7)	103.3 (39.6)	99.4 (37.4)	92.4 (33.6)	83.1 (28.4)	78.7 (25.9)	103.8 (39.9)
Mean daily maximum °F (°C)	59.0 (15.0)	62.7 (17.1)	69.5 (20.8)	77.1 (25.1)	84.1 (28.9)	91.5 (33.1)	96.0 (35.6)	97.0 (36.1)	90.5 (32.5)	80.3 (26.8)	68.8 (20.4)	60.4 (15.8)	78.1 (25.6)
Daily mean °F (°C)	46.5 (8.1)	50.3 (10.2)	57.2 (14.0)	65.1 (18.4)	73.1 (22.8)	80.8 (27.1)	84.4 (29.1)	84.9 (29.4)	78.3 (25.7)	67.8 (19.9)	56.3 (13.5)	48.2 (9.0)	66.1 (18.9)
Mean daily minimum °F (°C)	33.9 (1.1)	37.8 (3.2)	44.9 (7.2)	53.0 (11.7)	62.1 (16.7)	70.0 (21.1)	72.8 (22.7)	72.8 (22.7)	66.0 (18.9)	55.2 (12.9)	43.9 (6.6)	36.1 (2.3)	54.0 (12.2)
Mean minimum °F (°C)	19.7 (−6.8)	23.1 (−4.9)	27.8 (−2.3)	36.6 (2.6)	47.1 (8.4)	60.5 (15.8)	67.4 (19.7)	66.2 (19.0)	51.9 (11.1)	37.6 (3.1)	26.9 (−2.8)	22.4 (−5.3)	16.8 (−8.4)
Record low °F (°C)	−1 (−18)	−1 (−18)	12 (−11)	26 (−3)	36 (2)	48 (9)	55 (13)	53 (12)	38 (3)	21 (−6)	14 (−10)	−6 (−21)	−6 (−21)
Average precipitation inches (mm)	2.74 (70)	2.77 (70)	3.57 (91)	3.68 (93)	4.51 (115)	3.61 (92)	1.65 (42)	2.18 (55)	3.15 (80)	5.05 (128)	2.73 (69)	3.10 (79)	38.74 (984)
Average snowfall inches (cm)	0.1 (0.25)	0.3 (0.76)	0.1 (0.25)	0.0 (0.0)	0.0 (0.0)	0.0 (0.0)	0.0 (0.0)	0.0 (0.0)	0.0 (0.0)	0.0 (0.0)	0.0 (0.0)	0.2 (0.51)	0.7 (1.8)
Average precipitation days (≥ 0.01 in)	7.4	7.1	8.0	7.1	8.6	6.6	4.2	4.5	5.6	6.9	3.8	7.4	80.2
Average snowy days (≥ 0.1 in)	0.1	0.1	0.0	0.0	0.0	0.0	0.0	0.0	0.0	0.0	0.0	0.0	0.2
Source: NOAA

== Demographics ==
Historical population
Census	Pop.	Note	%±
1870	153		—
1880	313		104.6%
1890	2,541		711.8%
1900	5,346		110.4%
1910	6,115		14.4%
1920	6,952		13.7%
1930	7,823		12.5%
1940	7,799		−0.3%
1950	8,363		7.2%
1960	7,402		−11.5%
1970	7,224		−2.4%
1980	7,397		2.4%
1990	7,072		−4.4%
2000	8,232		16.4%
2010	8,456		2.7%
2020	8,221		−2.8%
U.S. Decennial Census

=== 2020 census ===
As of the 2020 census, there were 8,221 people, 2,940 households, and 2,024 families residing within the boundaries of Hillsboro, Texas.

The median age was 35.3 years; 27.6% of residents were under the age of 18 and 16.9% were 65 years of age or older, with 94.5 males for every 100 females overall and 90.4 males for every 100 females age 18 and over.

98.1% of residents lived in urban areas, while 1.9% lived in rural areas.

There were 2,940 households in Hillsboro, of which 36.7% had children under the age of 18 living in them. Of all households, 42.9% were married-couple households, 18.4% were households with a male householder and no spouse or partner present, and 33.1% were households with a female householder and no spouse or partner present. About 29.9% of all households were made up of individuals and 15.8% had someone living alone who was 65 years of age or older.

There were 3,355 housing units, of which 12.4% were vacant. The homeowner vacancy rate was 2.8% and the rental vacancy rate was 8.0%.

The racial and ethnic composition recorded by the census was as follows.

Racial composition as of the 2020 census
Race	Number	Percent
White	4,016	48.9%
Black or African American	1,128	13.7%
American Indian and Alaska Native	149	1.8%
Asian	80	1.0%
Native Hawaiian and Other Pacific Islander	7	0.1%
Some other race	1,645	20.0%
Two or more races	1,196	14.5%
Hispanic or Latino (of any race)	3,545	43.1%

== National Register of Historic Places ==
- Farmers National Bank 68 W. Elm St.
- Gebhardt Bakery 119 E. Franklin St.
- Grimes Garage 110 N. Waco St.
- Grimes House Country Club Rd. and Corporation St.
- Hill County Courthouse Courthouse Sq.
- Hill County Jail N. Waco St.
- Hillsboro Cotton Mills 220 N. Houston St.
- Hillsboro Residential Historic District Roughly bounded by Country Club Rd., Thompson, Corsicana, Pleasant, Franklin, and Elm Streets.
- McKenzie Site Address Restricted
- Missouri-Kansas-Texas Company Railroad Station Covington St.
- Old Rock Saloon 58 W. Elm St.
- Sturgis National Bank S. Waco and W. Elm Sts.
- Tarleton Building 110 E. Franklin St.
- U.S. Post Office 118 S. Waco St.
- Western Union Building 107 S. Covington St.

== Notable people ==
- Jerry Allison, drummer for The Crickets
- Madge Bellamy, film actress of the 1920s and '30s, best known for the horror classic White Zombie
- Bob Bullock, former Texas lieutenant governor, comptroller, secretary of state, and state representative
- Richard H. Carmichael, United States Army general
- Vara Martin Daniel - American educator and First Lady of Guam.
- Troy Dungan, WFAA-TV chief weather forecaster
- Roger Edens, Hollywood producer, composer, and vocal arranger
- Mike Harris, basketball player
- Rafer Johnson, the 1960 Olympic decathlon gold medalist
- Bob Johnston, record producer, songwriter, and musician
- Maggie Jones, blues singer and pianist
- Crawford Martin, former Attorney General of Texas, Texas Secretary of State, Texas State Senator, and mayor of Hillsboro
- Dr. J. Vernon McGee, Theologian, Bible teacher, pastor, radio broadcaster
- Billy Patterson, former NFL football player
- Mary Ellen Rudin, American mathematician; professor Emerita at the University of Wisconsin.
- Drew Nellins Smith, author
- Derel Walker, CFL football player

== Gallery ==
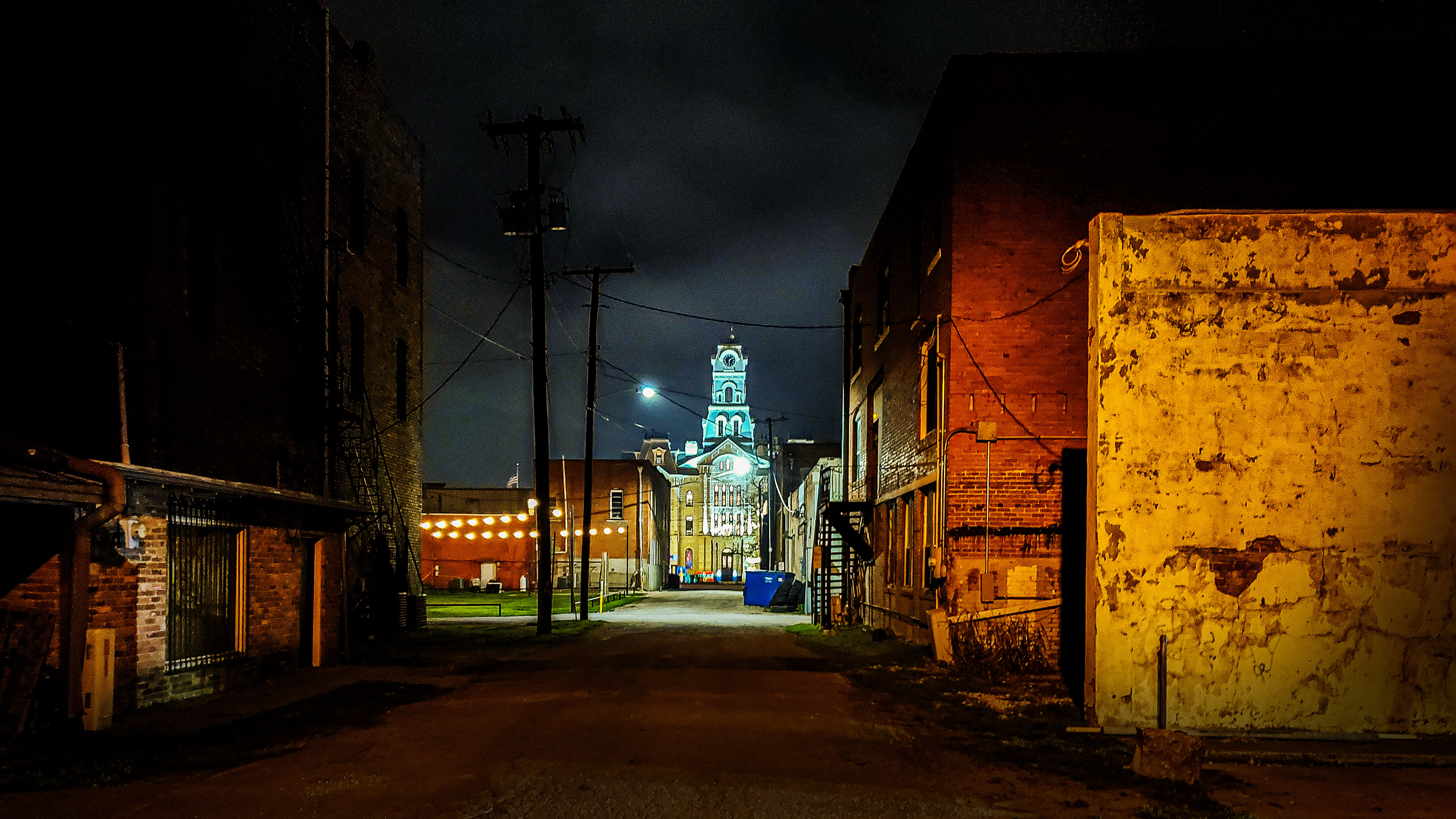

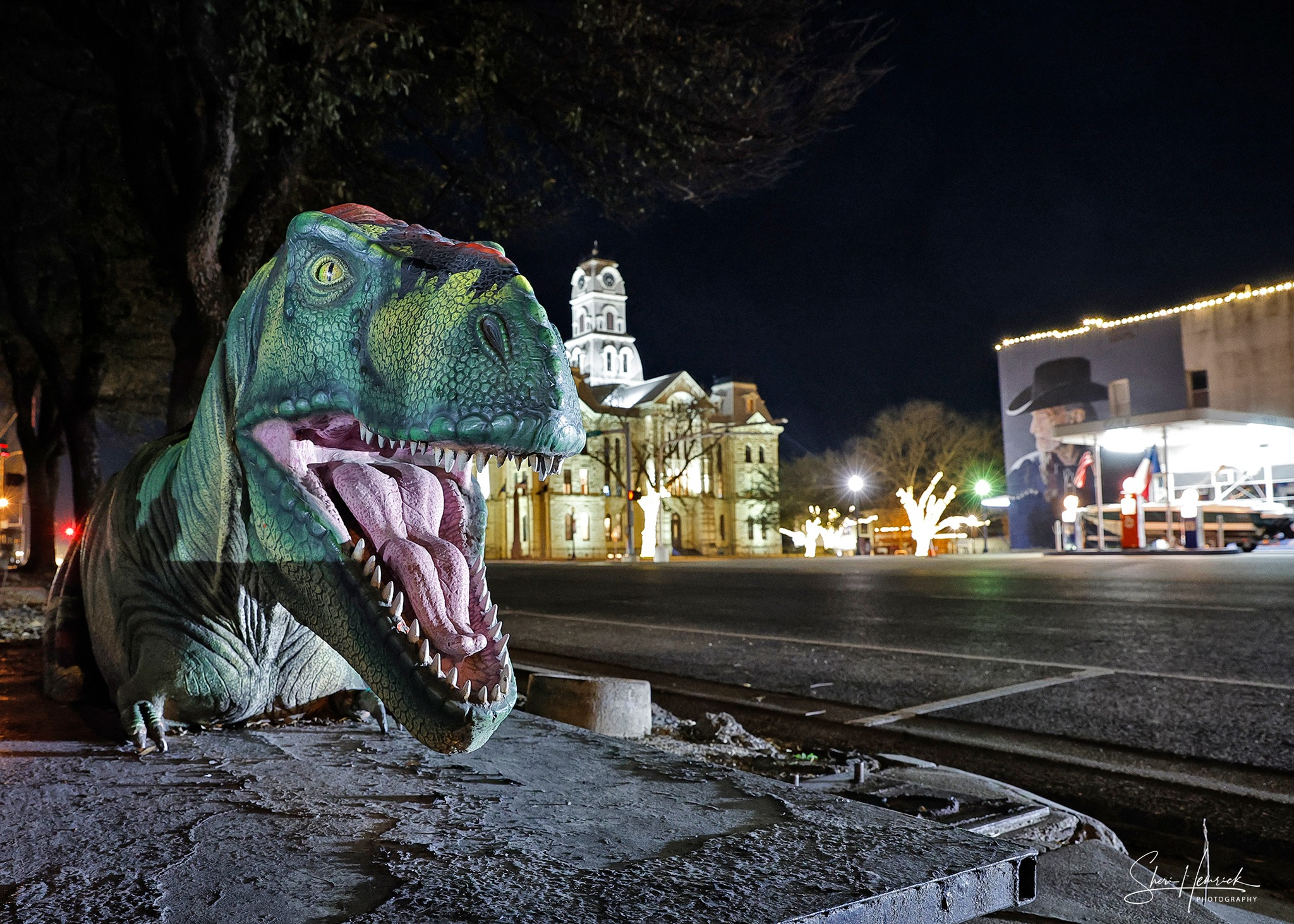

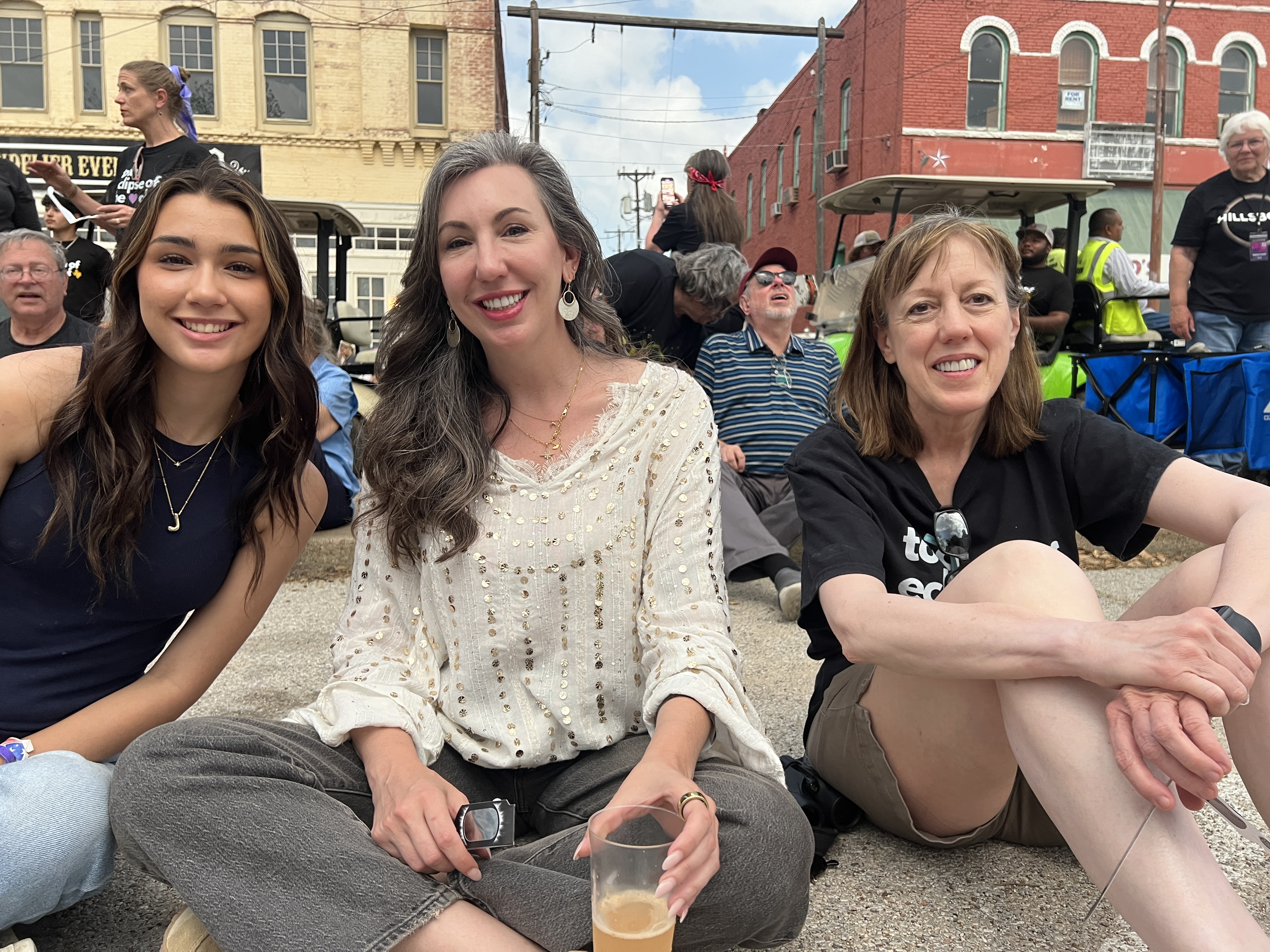

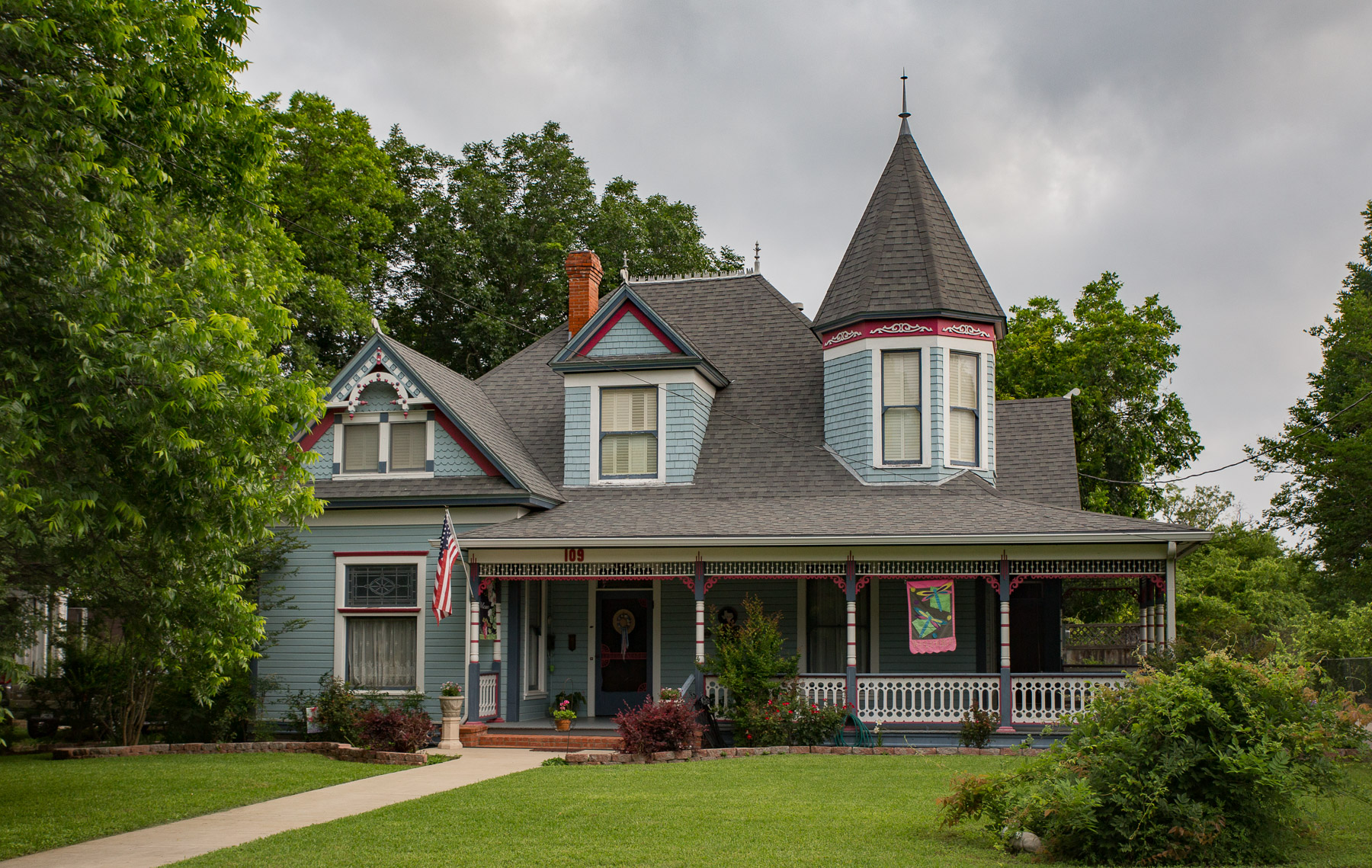

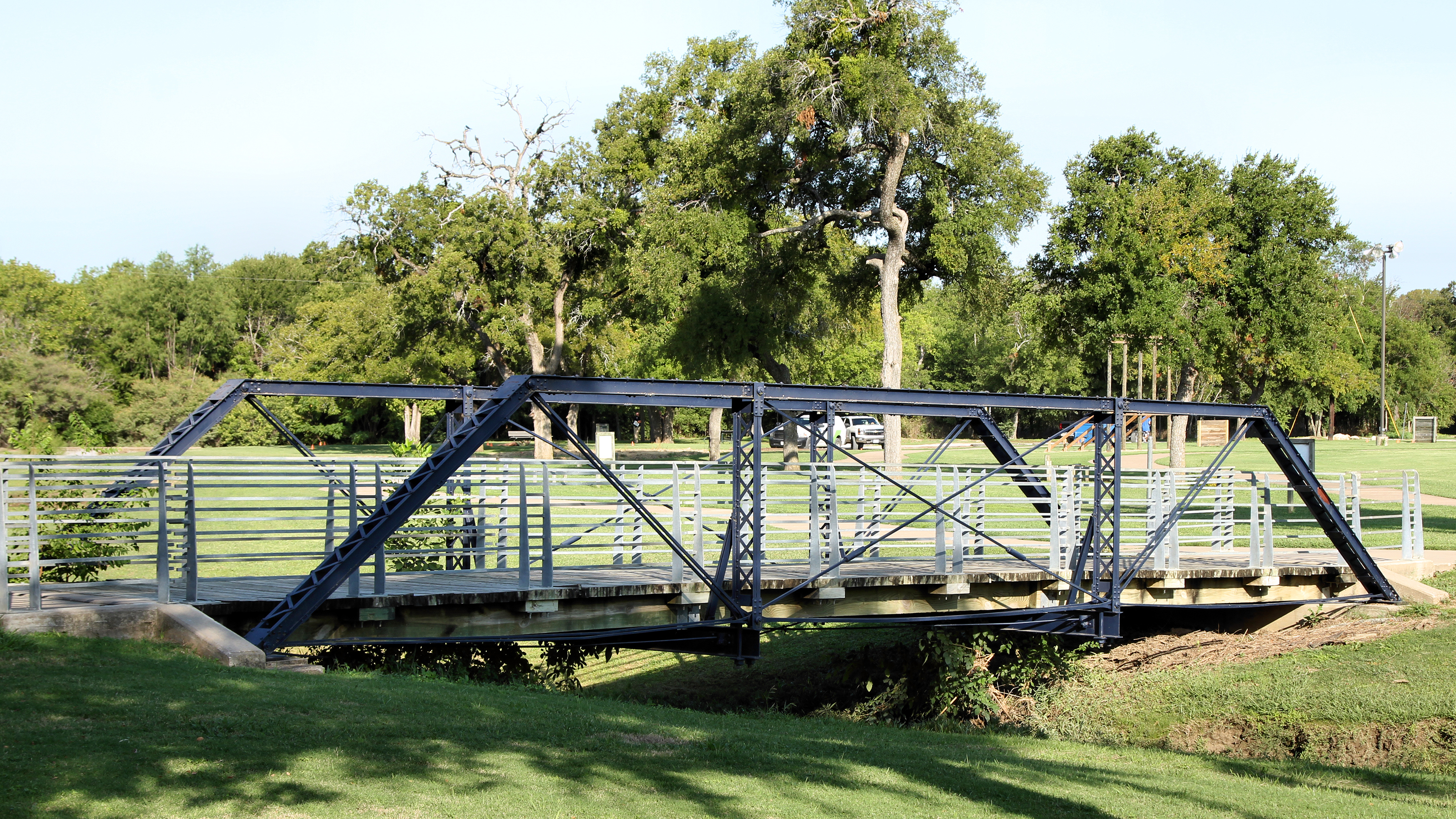

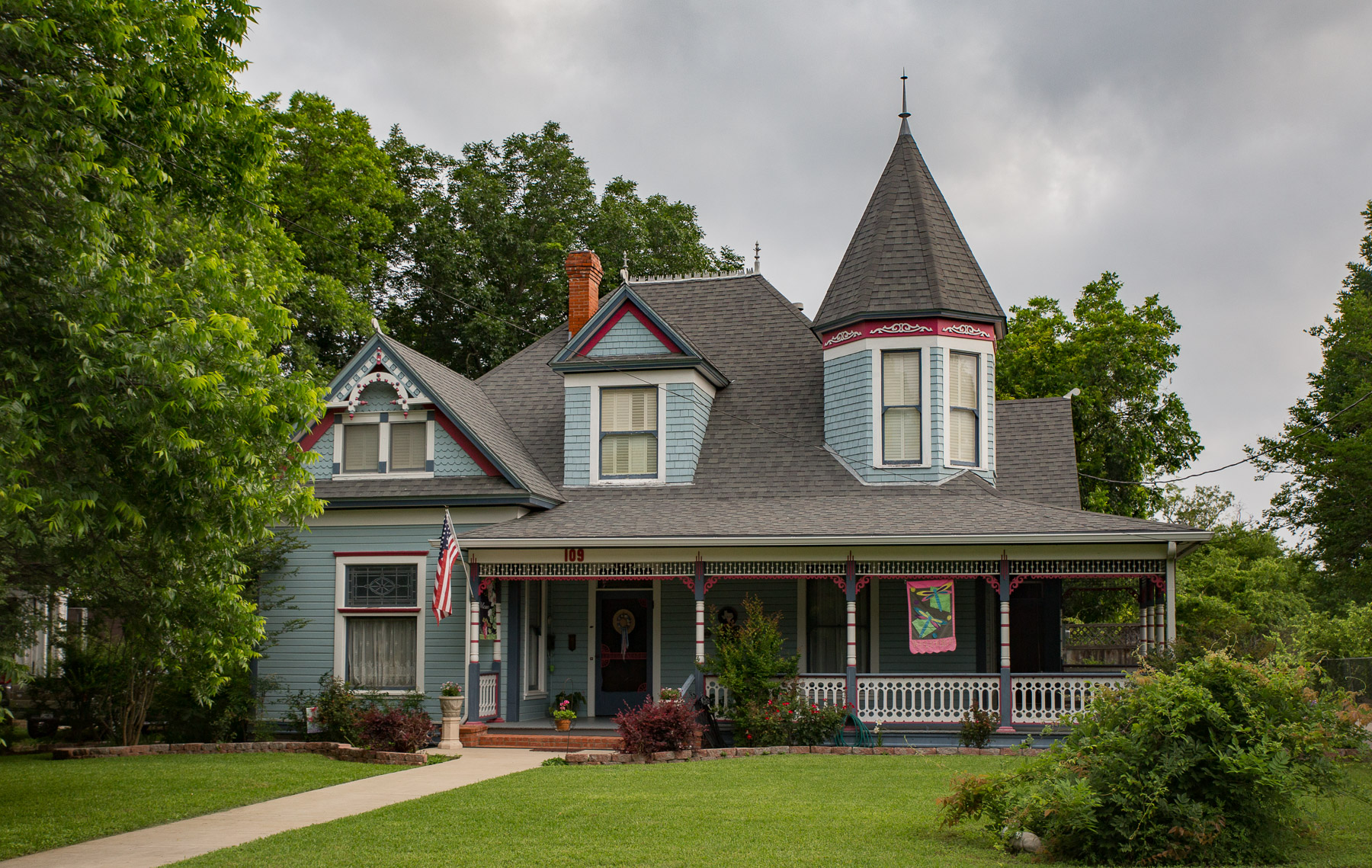

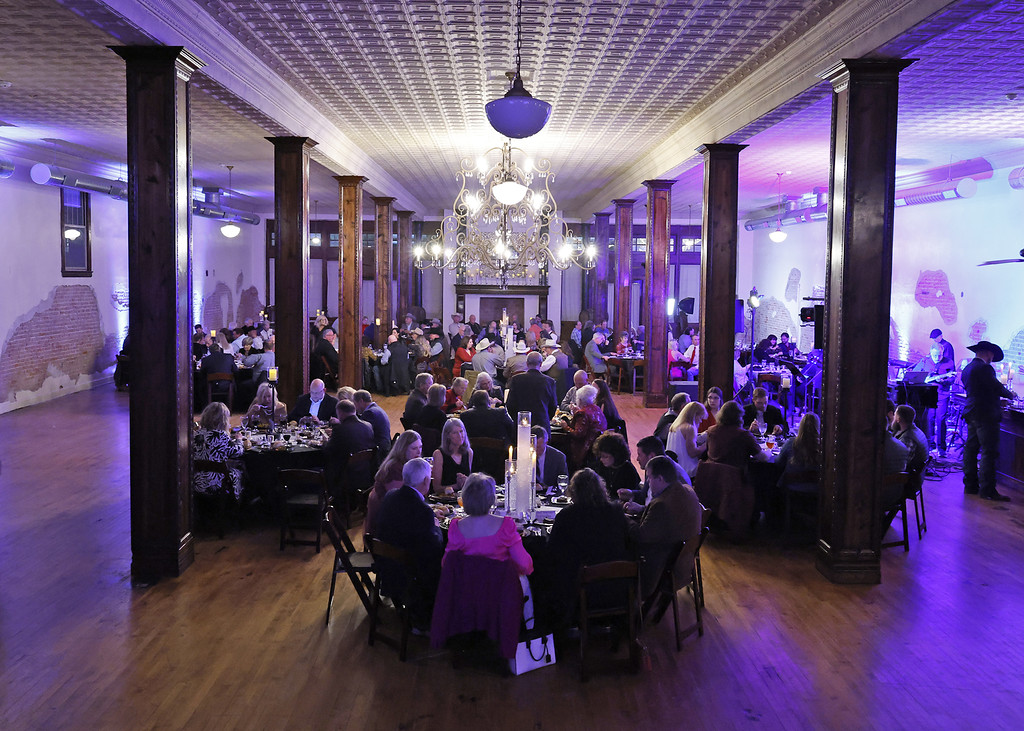

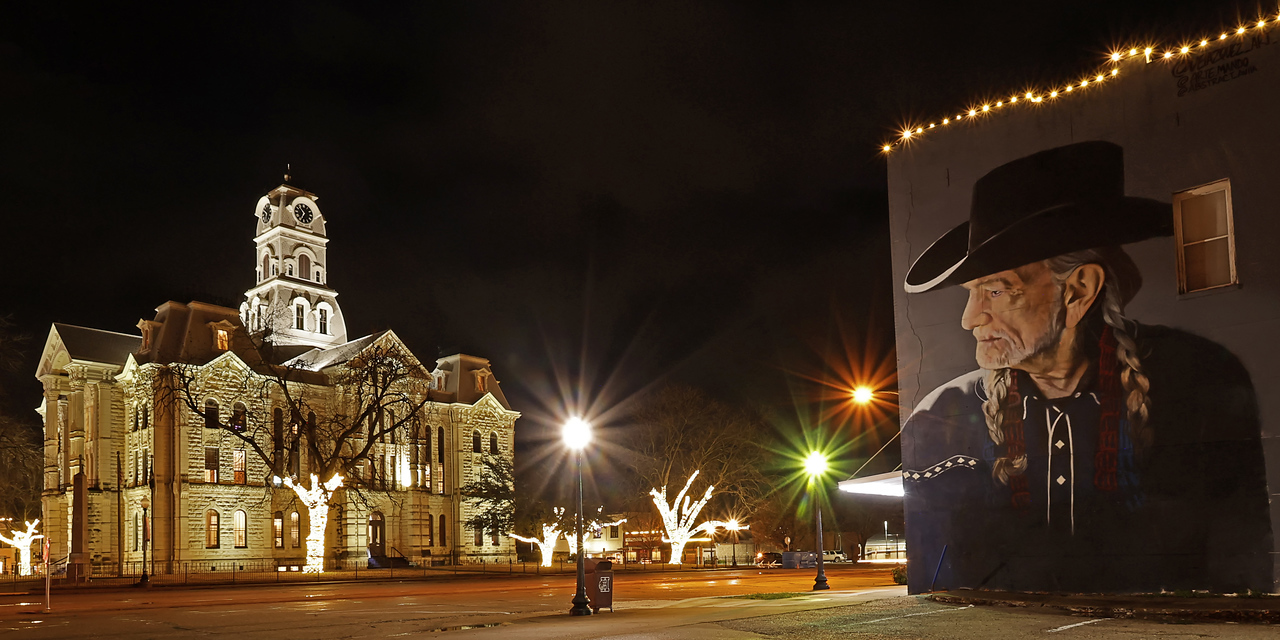

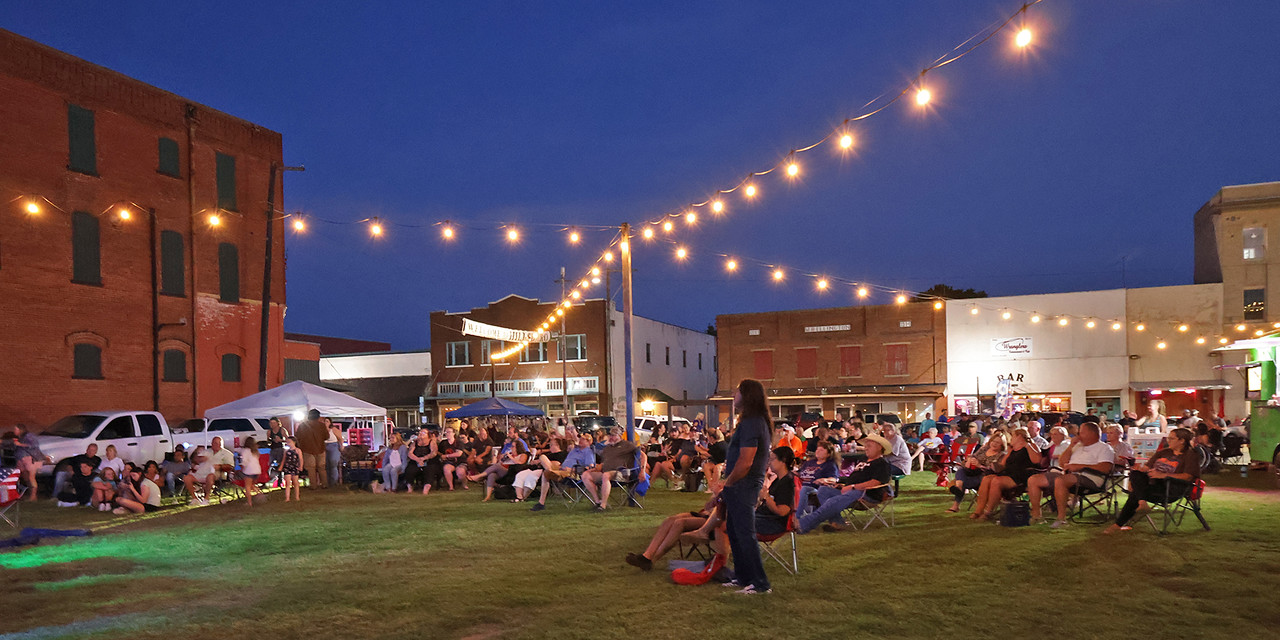

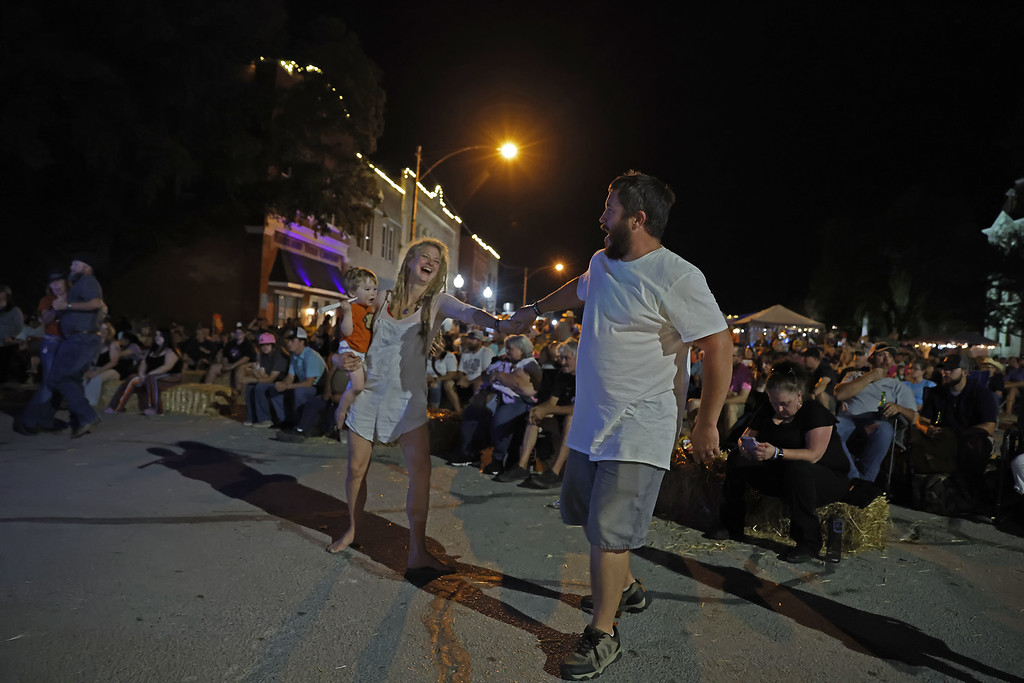

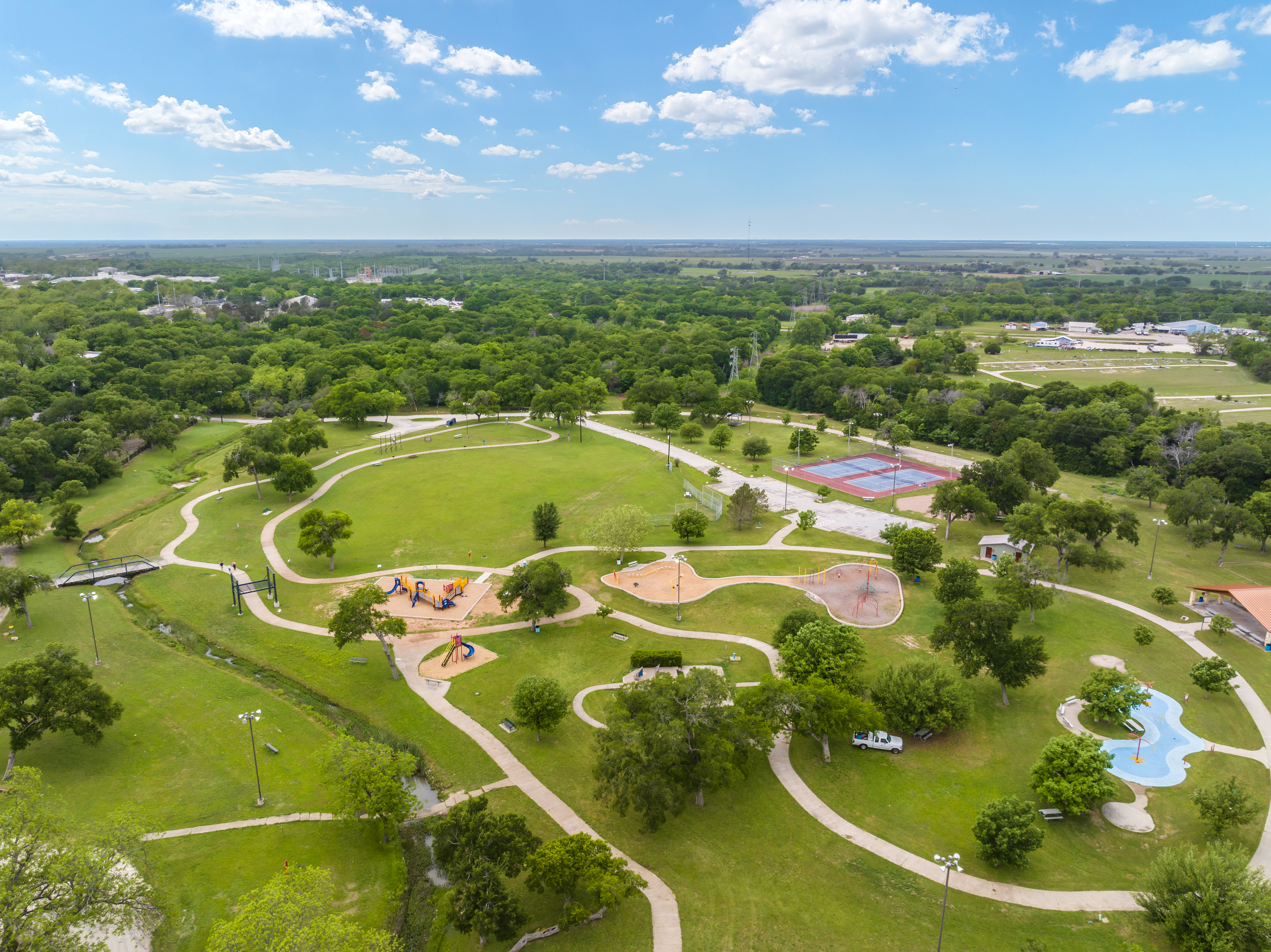
City Park in Hillsboro, Texas

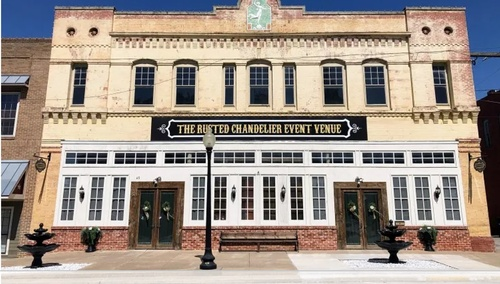

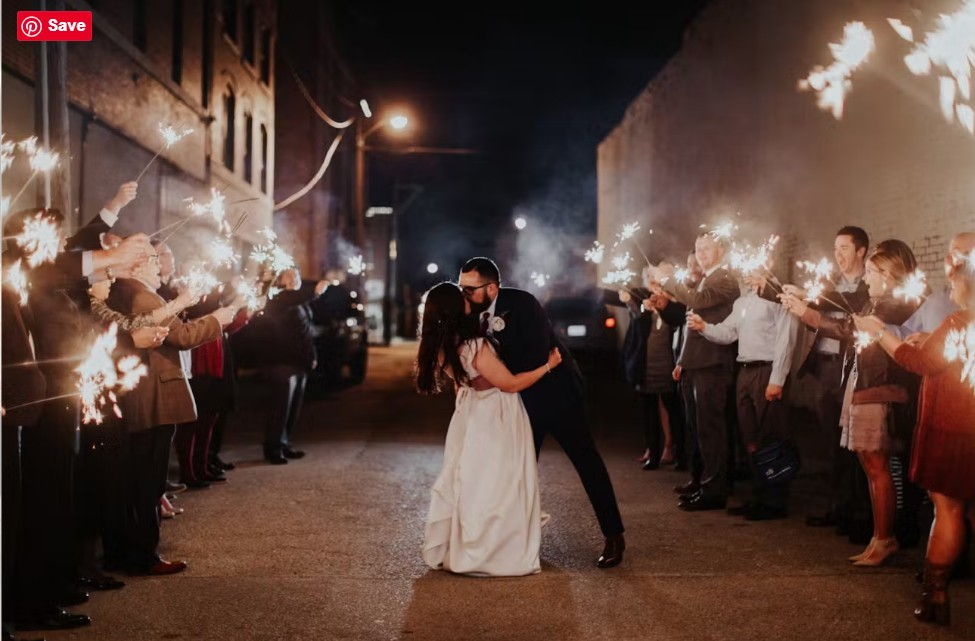

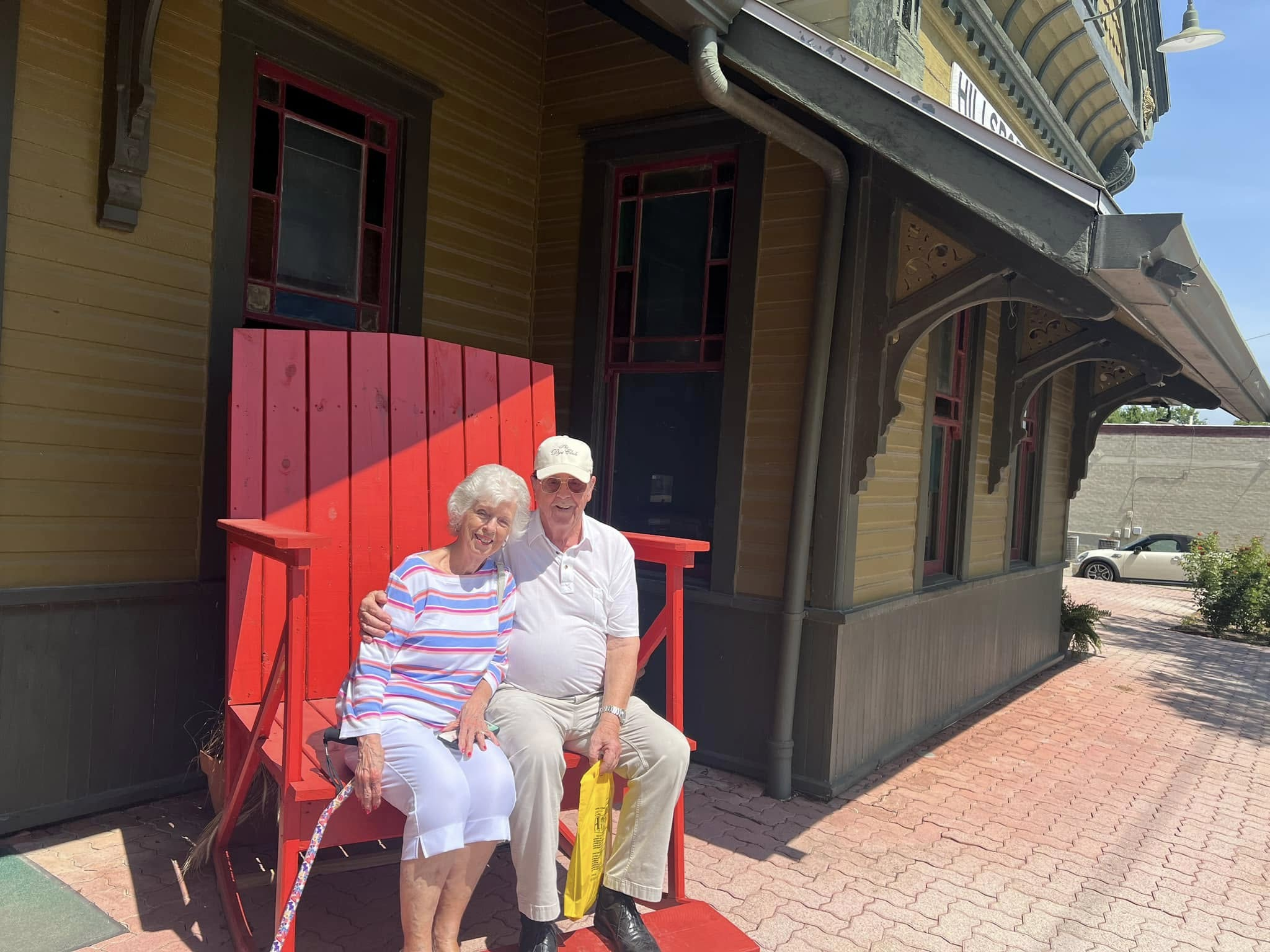

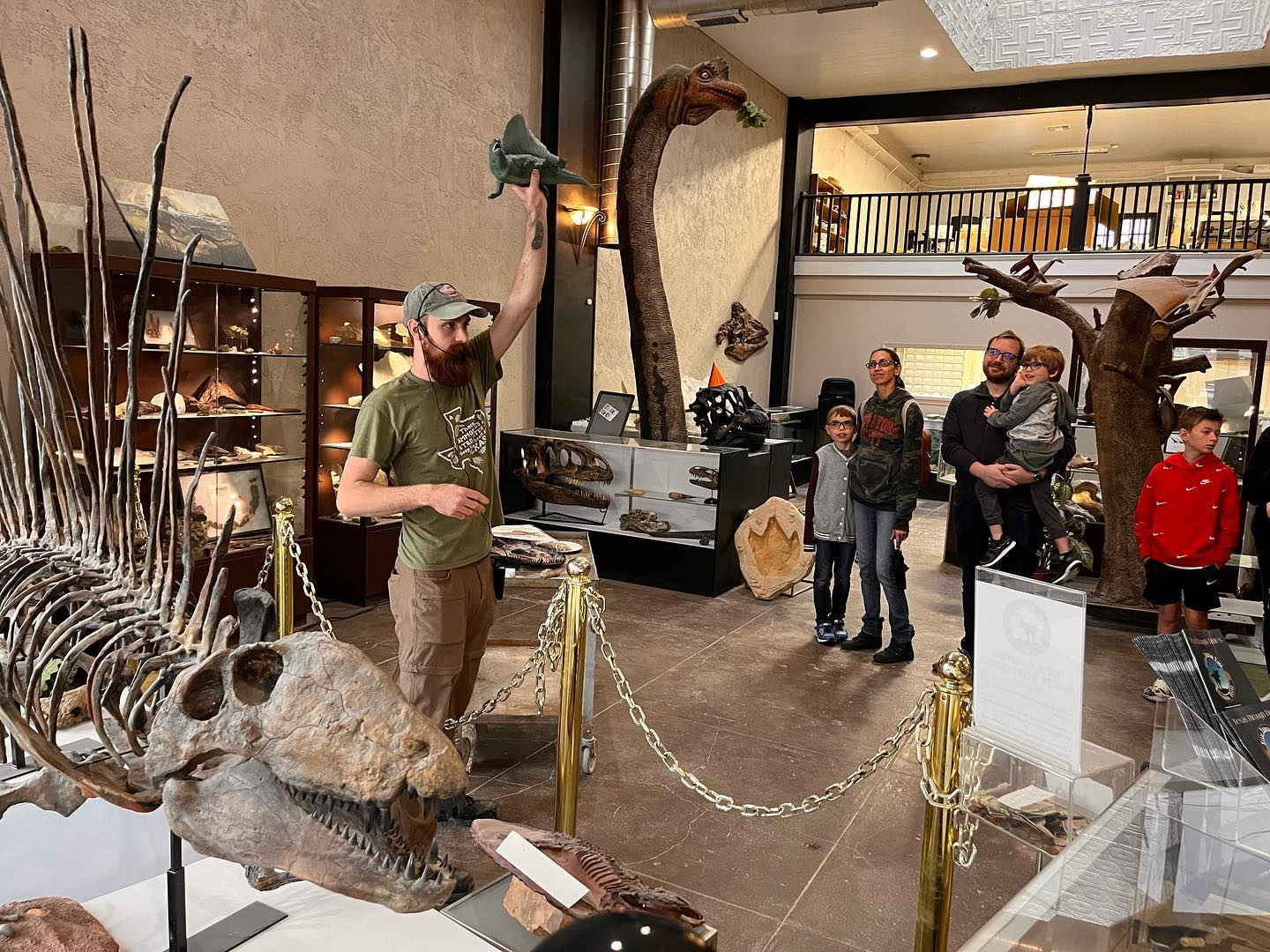

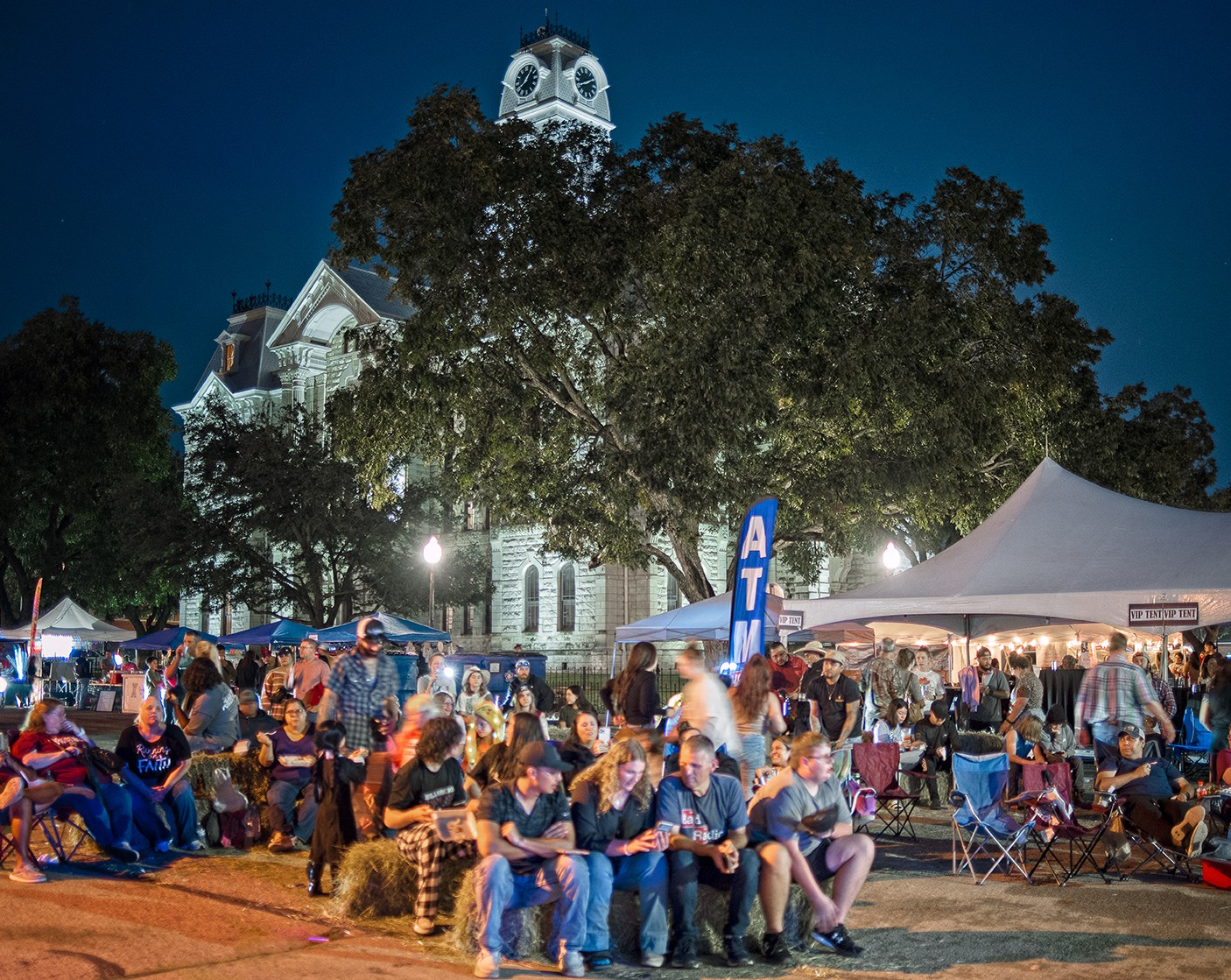

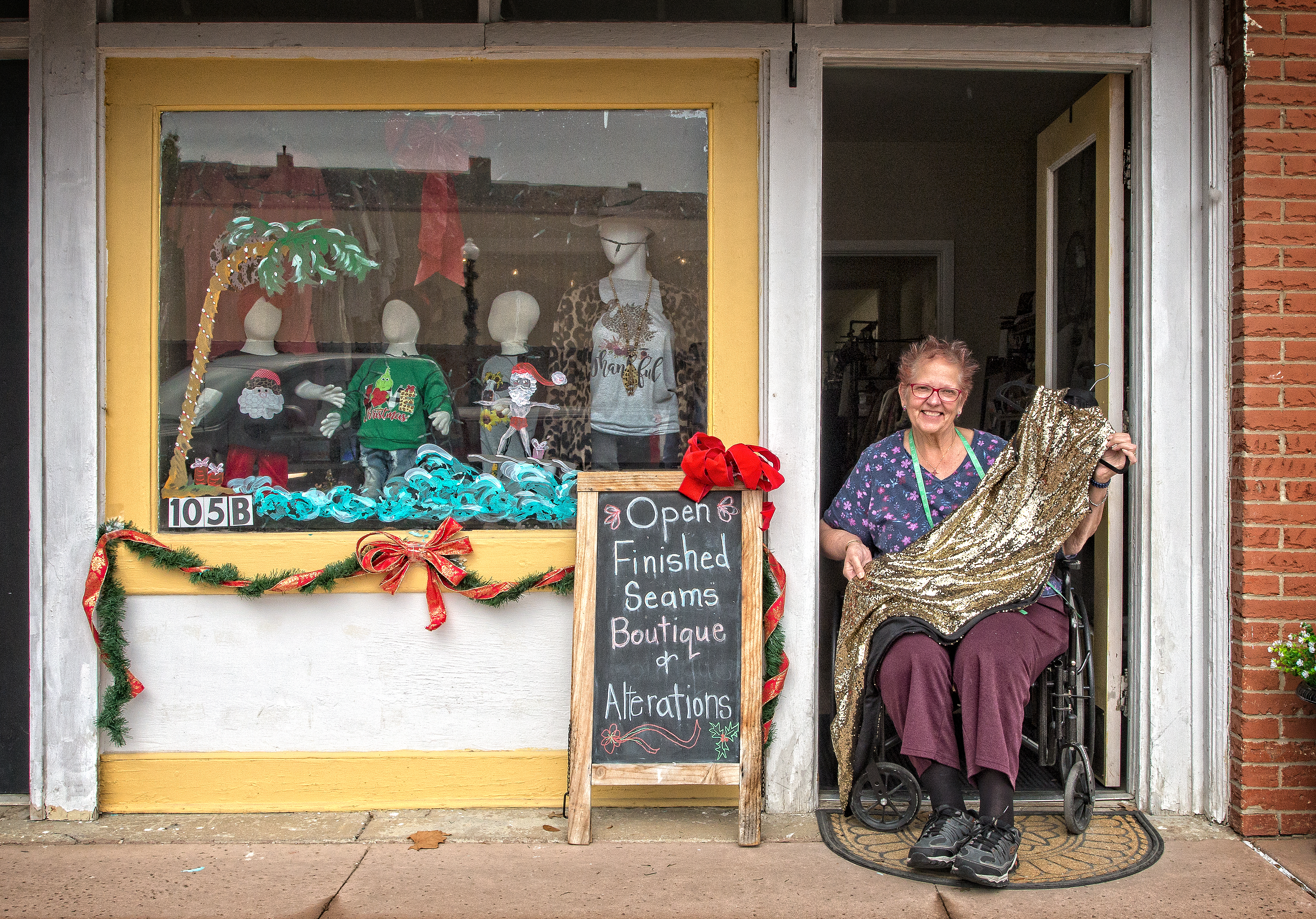

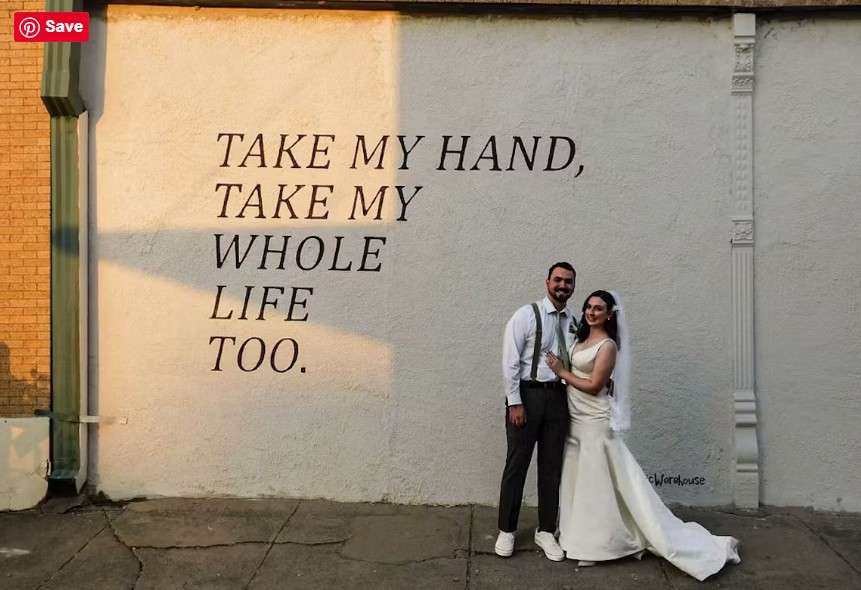
